= 1992 Supercopa Libertadores finals =

1992 Supercopa Libertadores Finals
- Event: 1992 Supercopa Libertadores
Cruzeiro	Racing
(Brazil)	(Argentina)
4	1
- (on aggregate)

First leg
Cruzeiro	Racing
4	0
- Date: November 18, 1992
- Venue: Mineirão, Belo Horizonte
- Referee: José Torres (Colombia)

Second leg
Racing	Cruzeiro
1	0
- Date: November 25, 1992
- Venue: El Cilindro, Avellaneda
- Referee: Juan Escobar (Paraguay)

The 1992 Supercopa Libertadores Finals was a two-legged football series to determine the winner of the 1992 Supercopa Libertadores. The finals were contested by Brazilian Cruzeiro Esporte Clube and Argentine side Racing Club de Avellaneda, which met again in a Supercopa final after their first encounter in 1988.

In the first leg, held in Mineirão in Belo Horizonte, Cruzeiro easily defeated Racing 4–0. The second leg was held in El Cilindro in Avellaneda, where Racing beat Cruzeiro 1–0. As both teams equaled on points, Cruzeiro won the series 4–1 on aggregate, taking revenge from Racing and achieving their first Supercopa Libertadores trophy.

== Qualified teams ==
Team	Previous finals app.
(Brazil) Cruzeiro	1988, **1991**
(Argentina) Racing	**1988**

Bold indicates winning years

== Venues ==
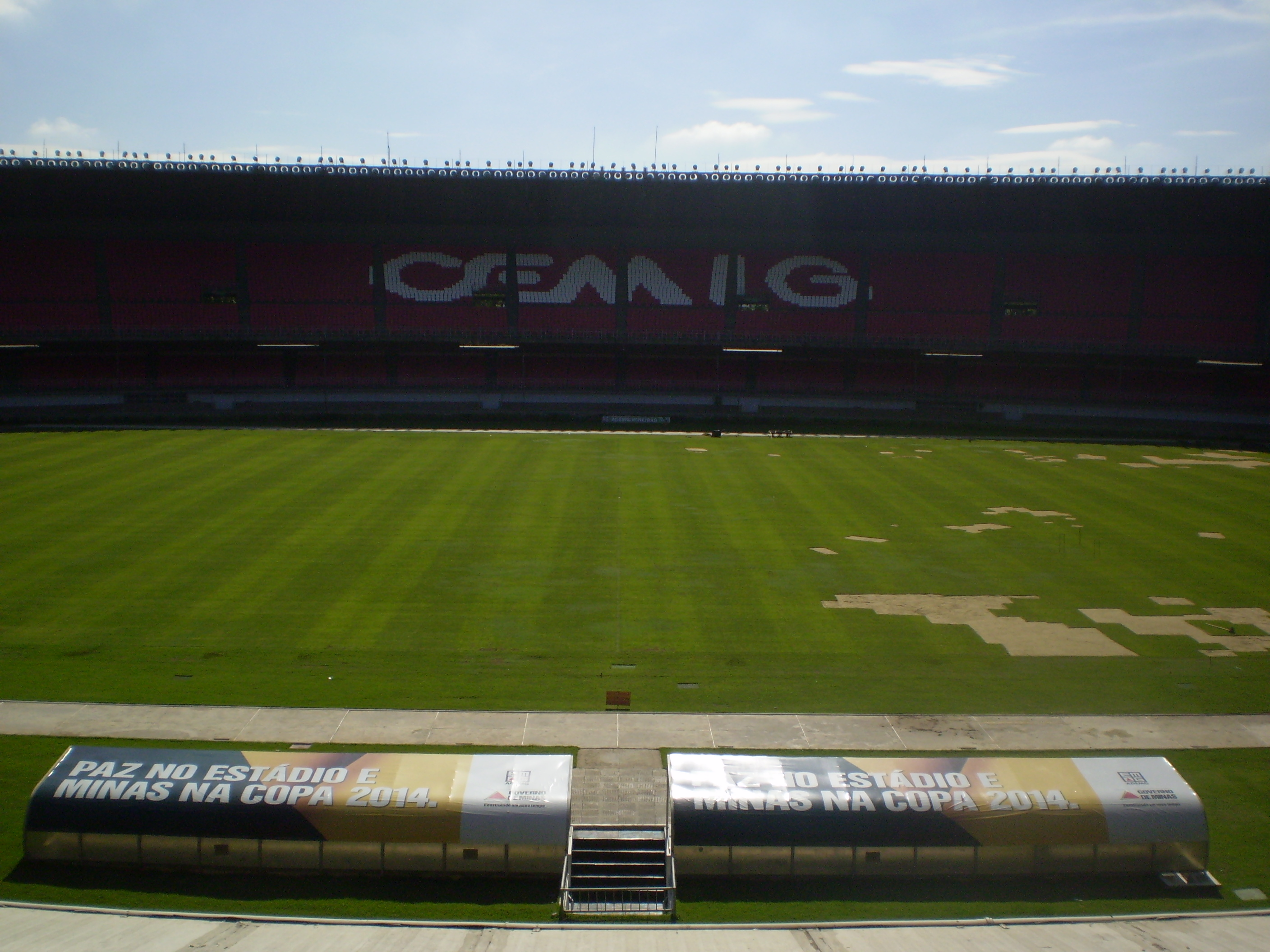
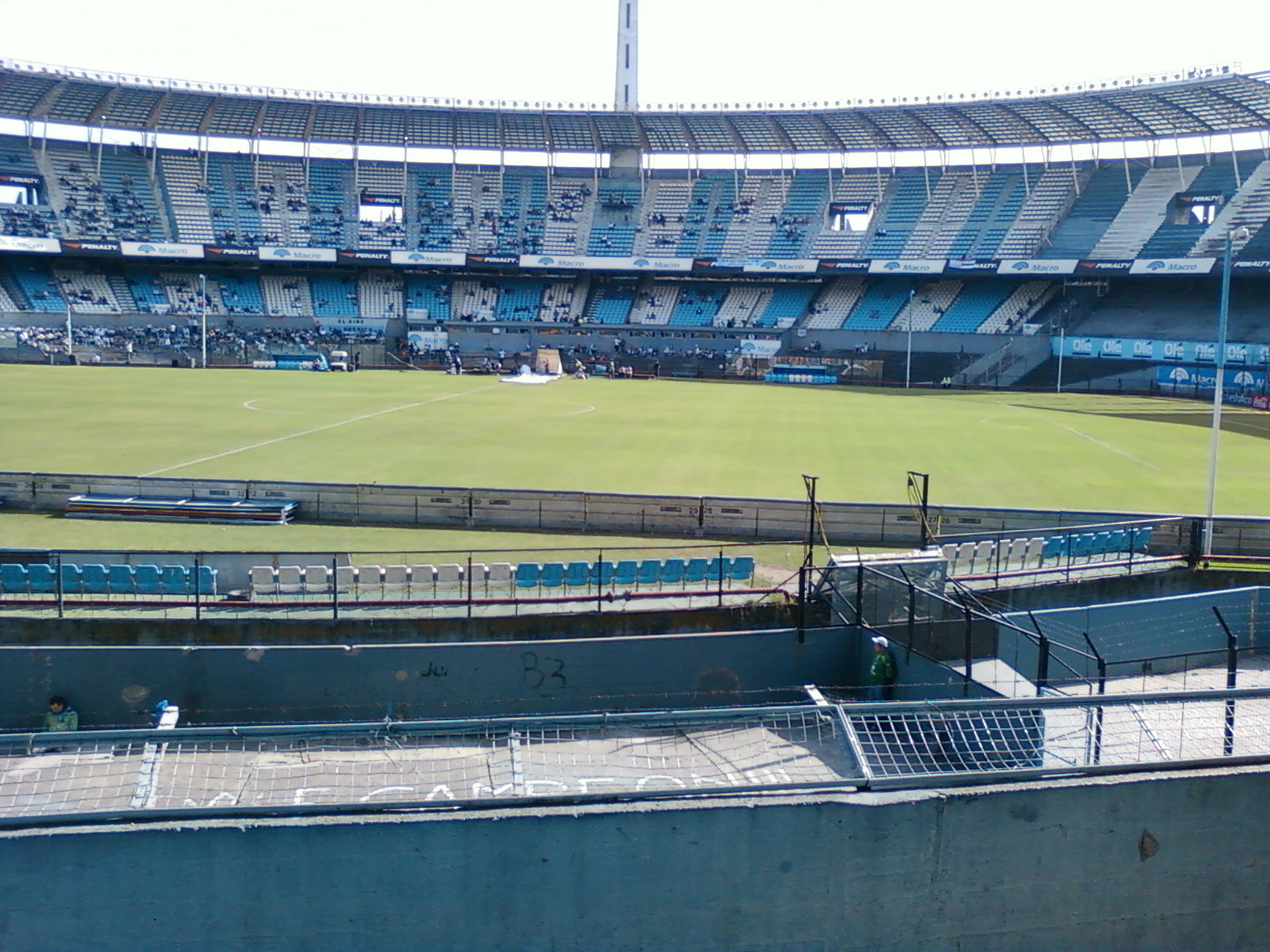
Mineirao (left) and El Cilindro, venues for the series

== Route to the final ==
Note: In all scores below, the score of the home team is given first.

(Brazil) Cruzeiro			Round	(Argentina) Racing		
Opponent	Venue	Score		Opponent	Venue	Score
(Colombia) Atlético Nacional (won 9–1 on aggregate)	Away	1–1	First round	(Argentina) Independiente (won 2–1 on aggregate)	Home	2–1
(Colombia) Atlético Nacional (won 9–1 on aggregate)	Home	8–0	First round	(Argentina) Independiente (won 2–1 on aggregate)	Away	0–0
(Argentina) River Plate (tied 2–2 on aggregate, won on penalties)	Home	2–0	Quarter-finals	(Uruguay) Nacional (won by w/o)	Home	–
(Argentina) River Plate (tied 2–2 on aggregate, won on penalties)	Away	2–0 (4–5 p)	Quarter-finals	(Uruguay) Nacional (won by w/o)	Away	–
(Paraguay) Olimpia (won 3–2 on aggregate)	Away	0–1	Semi-finals	(Brazil) Flamengo (won 4–3 on aggregate)	Away	3–3
(Paraguay) Olimpia (won 3–2 on aggregate)	Home	2–2	Semi-finals	(Brazil) Flamengo (won 4–3 on aggregate)	Home	1–0

== Match details ==
=== First leg ===
1992 Supercopa Libertadores Finals
November 18, 1992
First leg

Cruzeiro (Brazil)	4–0	(Argentina) Racing
Roberto Gaúcho; Luís Fernando; Boiadeiro

Mineirão, Belo Horizonte
Referee: José Torres (Colombia)

**Cruzeiro**
**Racing**

GK	**1**	(Brazil) Paulo César
DF		(Brazil) Paulo Roberto
DF		(Brazil) Luizinho
DF		(Brazil) Célio Lúcio
DF		(Brazil) Nonato
MF		(Brazil) Luís Fernando
MF		(Brazil) Betinho	(substituted off) 87'
MF		(Brazil) Douglas
MF	**10**	(Brazil) Boiadeiro (c)
FW	**7**	(Brazil) Renato Gaúcho
FW	**9**	(Brazil) Roberto Gaúcho
Substitutions:
		(Brazil) Cleisson	(substituted on) 87'
Manager:
(Brazil) Jair Pereira

GK	**1**	(Argentina) Carlos Roa
DF		(Argentina) Jorge Reinoso
DF	**2**	(Argentina) Jorge Borelli
DF		(Argentina) Cosme Zaccanti
DF		(Argentina) Juan Distéfano
MF	**8**	(Uruguay) Gustavo Matosas	(substituted off) a'
MF		(Argentina) Gustavo Costas
MF		(Argentina) Guillermo Guendulain
MF	**10**	(Uruguay) Rubén Paz (c)
FW	**7**	(Argentina) Claudio García
FW		(Argentina) Alfredo Graciani	(substituted off) b'
Substitutions:
FW		(Paraguay) Félix Torres	(substituted on) a'
		(Argentina) Abelardo Vallejos	(substituted on) b'
Manager:
(Argentina) Humberto Grondona

=== Second leg ===
November 25, 1992
Second leg

Racing (Argentina)	1–0	(Brazil) Cruzeiro
García 85' (pen.)

El Cilindro, Avellaneda
Referee: Juan Escobar (Paraguay)

**Racing**
**Cruzeiro**

GK	**1**	(Argentina) Carlos Roa
DF		(Argentina) Jorge Reinoso
DF		(Argentina) Abelardo Vallejos	(substituted off) 61'
DF		(Argentina) Juan Distéfano
DF		(Argentina) Gustavo Costas
MF	**8**	(Uruguay) Gustavo Matosas	(substituted off) 37'
MF		(Paraguay) Carlos Torres
MF		(Argentina) Guillermo Guendulain
MF	**10**	(Uruguay) Rubén Paz (c)
FW	**7**	(Argentina) Claudio García	(red card) 86'
FW		(Argentina) Alfredo Graciani
Substitutions:
FW		(Paraguay) Félix Torres	(substituted on) 61'
MF		(Argentina) Darío Cabrol	(substituted on) 37'
Manager:
(Argentina) Humberto Grondona

GK	**1**	(Brazil) Paulo César
DF		(Brazil) Paulo Roberto
DF		(Brazil) Luizinho
DF		(Brazil) Célio Lúcio
DF		(Brazil) Nonato
MF		(Brazil) Luís Fernando
MF		(Brazil) Betinho	(substituted off) 62'
MF	**8**	(Brazil) Douglas	(red card) 65'
MF	**10**	(Brazil) Boiadeiro (c)
FW	**7**	(Brazil) Renato Gaúcho
FW	**9**	(Brazil) Roberto Gaúcho	(substituted off) 78'
Substitutions:
		(Brazil) Rogério Laje	(substituted on) 62'
		(Brazil) Arley Alvarez	(substituted on) 78'
Manager:
(Brazil) Jair Pereira
