= 1992 Recopa Sudamericana =

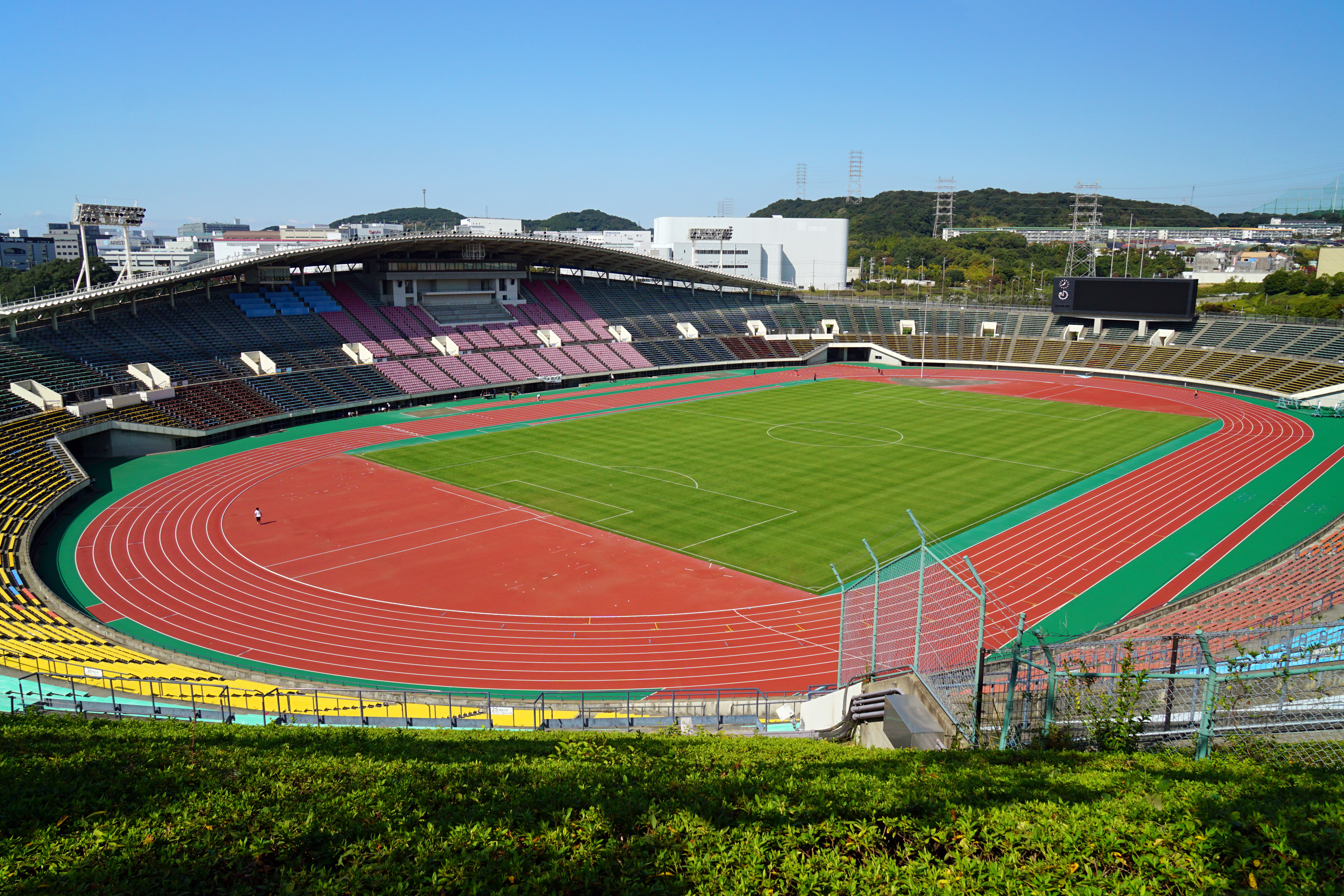
- Kobe Universiade Memorial Stadium, venue
- Event: Recopa Sudamericana
Colo-Colo	Cruzeiro
(Chile)	(Brazil)
0	0
- Colo-Colo won the penalty shootout 5–4
- Date: April 19, 1992
- Venue: Kobe Universiade Memorial Stadium, Kobe
- Referee: Juan Escobar Valdez (Paraguay)
- Attendance: 60,000

The 1992 Recopa Sudamericana was the fourth Recopa Sudamericana, an annual football match between the winners of the previous season's Copa Libertadores and Supercopa Sudamericana competitions.

The match was contested by Colo-Colo, winners of the 1991 Copa Libertadores winners, and Cruzeiro, winners of the 1991 Supercopa Sudamericana, at the Kobe Universiade Memorial Stadium in Kobe on April 19, 1992. Colo-Colo managed to defeat Cruzeiro 5–4 on penalties after a 0–0 tie and obtain their second international title. Mirko Jozić became the first, and so far only, non-South American manager to win the title.

== Qualified teams ==
Team	Previous finals app.
(Chile) Colo-Colo	None
(Brazil) Cruzeiro	None

Bold indicates winning years

== Match details ==
1992 Recopa Sudamericana
April 19, 1992

Colo-Colo (Chile)	0–0	(Brazil) Cruzeiro
Penalties
Borghi (penalty scored); Adomaitis (penalty scored); Margas (penalty scored); Vilches (penalty scored); Pizarro (penalty scored)	5–4	(penalty scored) Nonato; (penalty missed) Boiadeiro; (penalty scored) Charles; (penalty scored) Paulo Roberto; (penalty scored) Paulão

Kobe Universiade Memorial Stadium, Kobe
Attendance: 60,000
Referee: Juan Escobar (Paraguay)

**Colo-Colo**	**Cruzeiro**

GK	1	(Argentina) Daniel Morón	(substituted off) 120'
DF	3	(Chile) Lizardo Garrido
DF	6	(Chile) Miguel Ramírez
DF	4	(Chile) Javier Margas
DF	2	(Chile) Agustín Salvatierra
MF	5	(Chile) Eduardo Vilches
MF	7	(Chile) Gabriel Mendoza
MF	10	(Chile) Jaime Pizarro (c)
MF	8	(Argentina) Claudio Borghi
FW	9	(Chile) Aníbal González	(substituted off) 90'
FW	11	(Argentina) Héctor Adomaitis
Substitutes:
FW	14	(Chile) Hugo Rubio	(substituted on) 90'
GK	12	(Chile) Marcelo Ramírez	(substituted on) 120'
Manager:
(Croatia) Mirko Jozić

GK	1	(Brazil) Paulo César
DF	2	(Brazil) Paulo Roberto
DF	3	(Brazil) Paulão
DF	4	(Brazil) Adílson	(substituted off) 50'
DF	6	(Brazil) Nonato
MF	5	(Brazil) Ademir (c)
MF	8	(Brazil) Boiadeiro
MF	14	(Brazil) Andrade
MF	10	(Brazil) Luís Fernando
FW	7	(Brazil) Aélson	(substituted off) 90'
FW	9	(Brazil) Charles
Substitutes:
MF	13	(Brazil) Vanderci	(substituted on) 50'
FW	15	(Brazil) Macalé	(substituted on) 90'
Manager:
(Brazil) Ênio Andrade
