= 1991 Supercopa Libertadores finals =

1991 Supercopa Libertadores Finals
- Event: 1991 Supercopa Libertadores
River Plate	Cruzeiro
(Argentina)	(Brazil)
2	3
- (on aggregate)

First Leg
River Plate	Cruzeiro
2	0
- Date: November 13, 1991
- Venue: Estadio Monumental, Buenos Aires
- Referee: Mario Sánchez Yanten (Chile)

Second Leg
Cruzeiro	River Plate
3	0
- Date: November 20, 1991
- Venue: Mineirão, Belo Horizonte
- Referee: Mario Sánchez Yanten (Chile)

The 1991 Supercopa Libertadores Finals were the finals of the fourth edition of the Supercopa Libertadores football tournament. It was contested by Argentine club River Plate and Brazilian side Cruzeiro, which played their second Supercopa final.

The first leg of the tie was played at Estadio Monumental in Buenos Aires, River Plate won 2–0. In the second leg, held in Mineirão in Belo Horizonte, Cruzeiro won 3–0. As both teams equaled on points, Cruzeiro won the series 3–2 on aggregate, thus achieving their first Supercopa trophy.

== Qualified teams ==
Team	Previous finals app.
(Brazil) Cruzeiro	1988
(Argentina) River Plate	None

== Venues ==
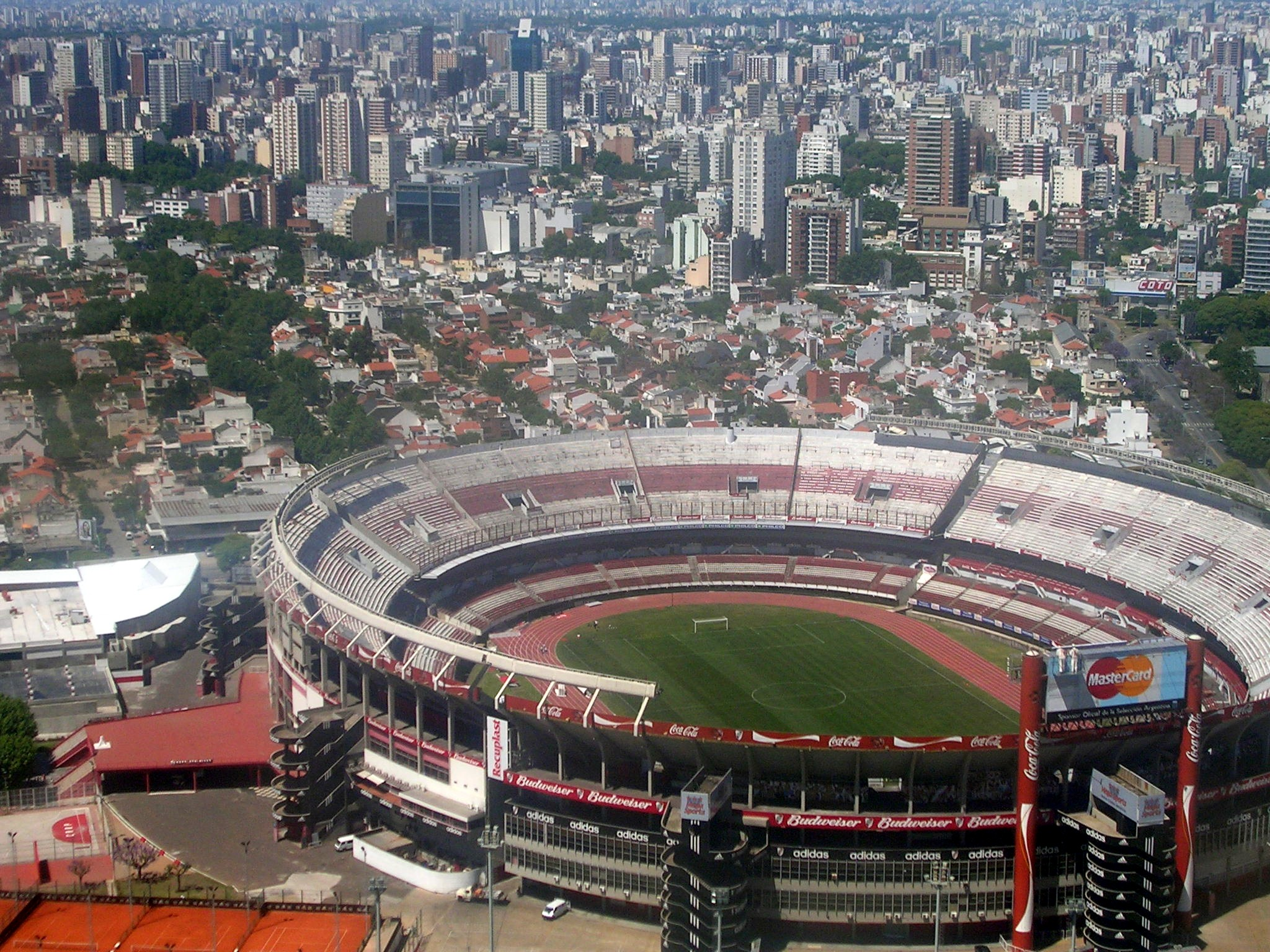
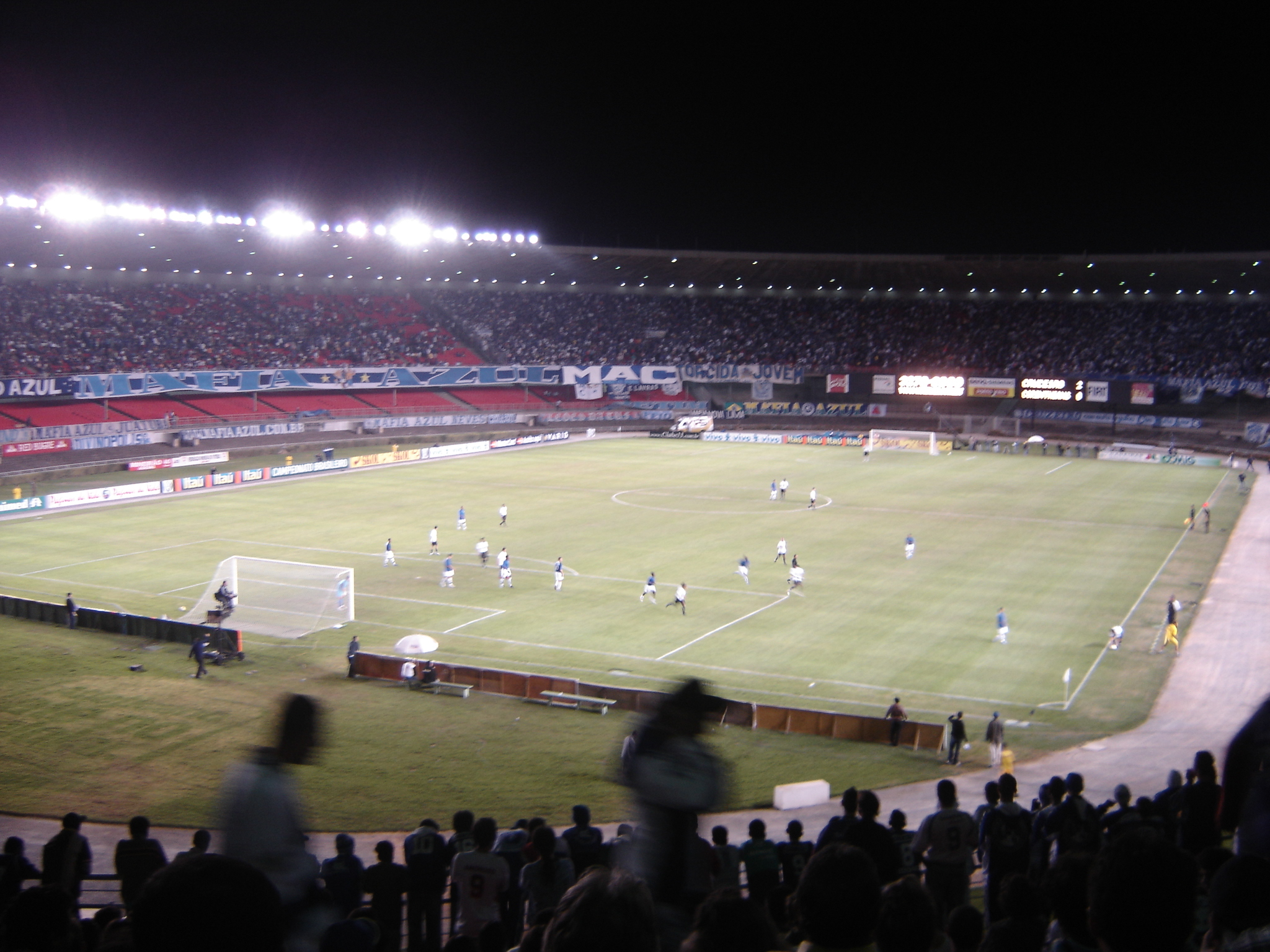
Estadio Monumental (left) and Estadio Mineirao, venues for the series

== Route to the final ==
Note: In all scores below, the score of the home team is given first.

(Brazil) Cruzeiro			Round	(Argentina) River Plate		
Opponent	Venue	Score		Opponent	Venue	Score
(Chile) Colo-Colo (tied 0–0 on aggregate, won on penalties)	Home	0–0	First round	(Brazil) Grêmio (tied 3–3 on aggregate, won on penalties)	Home	2–2
(Chile) Colo-Colo (tied 0–0 on aggregate, won on penalties)	Away	0–0 (3–4 p)	First round	(Brazil) Grêmio (tied 3–3 on aggregate, won on penalties)	Away	1–1 (3–4 p)
(Uruguay) Nacional (won 4–3 on aggregate)	Home	4–0	Quarter-finals	(Brazil) Flamengo (tied 2–2 on aggregate, won on penalties)	Home	1–0
(Uruguay) Nacional (won 4–3 on aggregate)	Away	3–0	Quarter-finals	(Brazil) Flamengo (tied 2–2 on aggregate, won on penalties)	Away	2–1 (3–4 p)
(Paraguay) Olimpia (tied 1–1 on aggregate, won on penalties)	Home	1–1	Semi-finals	(Uruguay) Peñarol (won 5–1 on aggregate)	Home	2–0
(Paraguay) Olimpia (tied 1–1 on aggregate, won on penalties)	Away	0–0 (3–5 p)	Semi-finals	(Uruguay) Peñarol (won 5–1 on aggregate)	Away	1–3

== Match details ==
=== First leg ===
1991 Supercopa Libertadores Finals
November 13, 1991
21:40
First leg

River Plate (Argentina)	2–0	(Brazil) Cruzeiro
Rivarola 32' (pen.); Higuaín 44'

Estadio Monumental, Buenos Aires
Referee: Juan Orellana (Ecuador)

River Plate	Cruzeiro

GK	(Argentina) Ángel Comizzo
DF	(Argentina) Jorge Gordillo
DF	(Argentina) Jorge Higuaín (c)
DF	(Argentina) Guillermo Rivarola
DF	(Argentina) Carlos Enrique
MF	(Argentina) Hernán Díaz
MF	(Argentina) Leonardo Astrada	(substituted off) a'
MF	(Argentina) Juan José Borrelli
MF	(Argentina) Ramón Medina Bello
FW	(Argentina) Ramón Díaz
FW	(Argentina) Walter Silvani	(substituted off) b'
Substitutes:
MF	(Argentina) Gustavo Zapata	(substituted on) a'
MF	(Argentina) Sergio Berti	(substituted on) b'
Manager:
(Argentina) Daniel Passarella

GK	(Brazil) Paulo César
DF	(Brazil) Zelao
DF	(Brazil) Vanderci
DF	(Brazil) Adílson
DF	(Brazil) Nonato
MF	(Brazil) Ademir (c)
MF	(Brazil) Boiadeiro
MF	(Brazil) Luís Fernando
MF	(Brazil) Mário Tilico	(substituted off) a'
FW	(Brazil) Charles	(substituted off) b'
FW	(Brazil) Andrade
Substitutes:
	(Brazil) Paulinho	(substituted on) a'
MF	(Brazil) Macalé	(substituted on) b'
Manager:
(Brazil) Ênio Andrade

=== Second leg ===
November 20, 1991
Second leg

Cruzeiro (Brazil)	3–0	(Argentina) River Plate
Ademir 34'; Tilico 52', 76'

Mineirão, Belo Horizonte
Attendance: 67,279
Referee: Hernán Silva (Chile)

Cruzeiro	River Plate

GK	(Brazil) Paulo César
DF	(Brazil) Nonato
DF	(Brazil) Paulão
DF	(Brazil) Adílson
DF	(Brazil) Célio Gaúcho
MF	(Brazil) Ademir (c)
MF	(Brazil) Boiadeiro
MF	(Brazil) Luís Fernando	Substituted off
MF	(Brazil) Mário Tilico
FW	(Brazil) Charles
FW	(Brazil) Marquinhos
Substitutes:
MF	(Brazil) Macalé (substituted on)
Manager:
(Brazil) Ênio Andrade

GK	(Argentina) Ángel Comizzo
DF	(Argentina) Jorge Gordillo
DF	(Argentina) Jorge Higuaín (c)
DF	(Argentina) Guillermo Rivarola
DF	(Argentina) Carlos Enrique
MF	(Argentina) Hernán Díaz	(substituted off) b'
MF	(Argentina) Leonardo Astrada
MF	(Argentina) Gustavo Zapata	(substituted off) a'
MF	(Argentina) Juán José Borrelli
FW	(Argentina) Ramón Medina Bello
FW	(Argentina) Ramón Díaz
Substitutes:
MF	(Argentina) Julio César Toresani	(substituted on) a'
MF	(Argentina) Sergio Berti	(substituted on) b'
Manager:
(Argentina) Daniel Passarella
