= 1992 Copa Master de Supercopa Final =

1992 Copa Master Final
- Event: 1992 Copa Master de Supercopa
Boca Juniors	Cruzeiro
(Argentina)	(Brazil)
2	1
- Date: 31 May 1992
- Venue: José Amalfitani Stadium, Buenos Aires
- Referee: Jorge Nieves Parra (Uruguay)

The 1992 Copa Master de Supercopa Final was a football match to determine the champion of Copa Master de Supercopa, a competition played under a single-elimination basis contested by winning teams of Supercopa Libertadores. This edition was played between Argentine club Boca Juniors and Brazilian club Cruzeiro on May 31, 1992, at José Amalfitani Stadium.

On their road to the final, Boca Juniors had beaten Paraguayan Olimpia 1–0, while Cruzeiro had defeated Racing 3–1 on penalties after both teams tied 1–1 in regular time. Those matches were played at José Amalfitani Stadium as well.

In the final, Boca Juniors beat Cruzeiro 2–1 to claim their first Copa Master title.

== Qualified teams ==
Team	Previous finals app.
(Argentina) Boca Juniors	None
(Brazil) Cruzeiro	None

== Final summary ==
1992 Copa Master Final
May 31, 1992

Boca Juniors (Argentina)	2–1	(Brazil) Cruzeiro
Soñora 27'; Giuntini 71'	Report	Edson 37'

José Amalfitani Stadium, Buenos Aires
Referee: Jorge Luis Nieves Parra (Uruguay)

Boca Juniors	Cruzeiro

GK	1	(Colombia) Carlos Navarro Montoya
DF	4	(Argentina) Diego Soñora
DF	2	(Argentina) Juan Simón
DF	6	(Argentina) Alejandro Giuntini
DF	3	(Argentina) Luis Abramovich
MF	5	(Argentina) Walter Pico
MF	8	(Argentina) Blas Giunta
MF	11	(Argentina) Antonio Apud	(substituted off) 61'
MF	9	(Argentina) Alberto Márcico
FW	7	(Argentina) Sergio Saturno	(substituted off) 45'
FW	10	(Paraguay) Roberto Cabañas
Substitutes:
MF	15	(Argentina) Ricardo Rentera	(substituted on) 45'
FW	16	(Argentina) Gabriel Amato	(substituted on) 61'
GK	12	(Argentina) Esteban Pogany
DF	13	(Argentina) Víctor Marchesini
DF	18	(Argentina) Ivar Stafuza
Manager:
(Uruguay) Oscar Tabárez

GK	1	(Brazil) Ze Carlos
DF	2	(Brazil) Paulo Roberto
DF	3	(Brazil) Paulão
DF	4	(Brazil) Célio Lúcio
DF	6	(Brazil) Nonato
MF	5	(Brazil) Ademir
MF	8	(Brazil) Boiadeiro
MF	7	(Brazil) Luis Fernando	(substituted off) 73'
FW	11	(Brazil) Edson	(substituted off) 76'
FW	10	(Brazil) Cleisson
FW	9	(Brazil) Charles Bahiano
Substitutes:
FW		(Brazil) Riva	(substituted on) 73'
MF		(Brazil) Andrade	(substituted on) 76'
Manager:
(Brazil) Jair Pereira
