= List of Supercopa Libertadores finals =

Supercopa Libertadores
- Organizing body: CONMEBOL
- Founded: 1988
- Abolished: 1997; 28 years ago
- Region: South America
- Number of teams: Varied per year
- Related competitions: Copa Libertadores
- Most successful club(s): (Brazil) Cruzeiro; (Argentina) Independiente; (2 titles each)

The Supercopa Libertadores was a seasonal association football competition that was established in 1988. It was usually contested between August and December. The Supercopa Sudamericana was opened to the past winners of Copa Libertadores; Vasco da Gama, winners of the Copa de Campeones tournament held in 1948, was later allowed to participate. Nearly every phase of the competition was contested over two legs, one at each participating club's stadium. Racing Club won the inaugural competition in 1988, defeating Cruzeiro 4–1 on points.

Cruzeiro, alongside Independiente, hold the record for the most victories, with two wins each since the competition's inception. They are also the only teams to have won the competition consecutively. Overall, eight different clubs have won the competition since its inception in 1988 until it folded in 1997 to give room for other competitions. Clubs from Argentina have won the most Supercopa Libertadores titles, with six wins among them. Brazilian teams are second with three victories, and Paraguay are third with a lone triumph.

== Key ==
#	Finals decided on goal aggregate
*	Finals decided by a penalty shootout
**Bold**	Indicates the winner in two-legged finals
Year	Each link is the relevant Supercopa Libertadores article for that year

== Finals ==
Year	Country	Winner	Score	Runner-up	Country	Venue	Location
1988	ARG	Racing	2–1	Cruzeiro	BRA	El Cilindro	Avellaneda, Argentina
1988	ARG	Racing	1–1	Cruzeiro	BRA	Mineirão	Belo Horizonte, Brazil
1988	Racing won 4–1 on points						
1989	ARG	Boca Juniors	0–0	Independiente	ARG	La Bombonera	Buenos Aires, Argentina
1989	ARG	Boca Juniors	0–0	Independiente	ARG	La Doble Visera	Avellaneda, Argentina
1989	2–2 on points and 0–0 on goal difference; Boca Juniors won 5–3 in a penalty shootout *						
1990	PAR	Olimpia	3–0	Nacional	URU	Estadio Centenario	Montevideo, Uruguay
1990	PAR	Olimpia	3–3	Nacional	URU	Estadio Defensores del Chaco	Asunción, Paraguay
1990	Olimpia won 4–1 on points						
1991	BRA	Cruzeiro	0–2	River Plate	ARG	Estadio Monumental	Buenos Aires, Argentina
1991	BRA	Cruzeiro	3–0	River Plate	ARG	Mineirão	Belo Horizonte, Brazil
1991	3–3 on points; Cruzeiro won 3–2 on aggregate						
1992	BRA	Cruzeiro	4–0	Racing	ARG	Mineirão	Belo Horizonte, Brazil
1992	BRA	Cruzeiro	0–1	Racing	ARG	El Cilindro	Avellaneda, Argentina
1992	3–3 on points; Cruzeiro won 4–1 on aggregate						
1993	BRA	São Paulo	2–2	Flamengo	BRA	Estádio do Maracanã	Rio de Janeiro, Brazil
1993	BRA	São Paulo	2–2	Flamengo	BRA	Estádio do Morumbi	São Paulo, Brazil
1993	2–2 on points and 4–4 on aggregate; São Paulo won 5–3 in a penalty shootout *						
1994	ARG	Independiente	1–1	Boca Juniors	ARG	La Bombonera	Buenos Aires, Argentina
1994	ARG	Independiente	2–1	Boca Juniors	ARG	La Doble Visera	Avellaneda, Argentina
1994	Independiente won 4–1 on points						
1995	ARG	Independiente	2–0	Flamengo	BRA	La Doble Visera	Avellaneda, Argentina
1995	ARG	Independiente	0–1	Flamengo	BRA	Estádio do Maracanã	Rio de Janeiro, Brazil
1995	3–3 on points; Independiente won 2–1 on aggregate						
1996	ARG	Vélez Sarsfield	1–0	Cruzeiro	BRA	Mineirão	Belo Horizonte, Brazil
1996	ARG	Vélez Sarsfield	2–0	Cruzeiro	BRA	Estadio José Amalfitani	Buenos Aires, Argentina
1996	Vélez Sarsfield won 6–0 on points						
1997	ARG	River Plate	0–0	São Paulo	BRA	Estádio do Morumbi	São Paulo, Brazil
1997	ARG	River Plate	2–1	São Paulo	BRA	Estadio Monumental	Buenos Aires, Argentina
1997	River Plate won 4–1 on points						

== Performances ==
=== By club ===
Club	Titles	Runners-up	Seasons won	Seasons runner-up
(Brazil) Cruzeiro	2	2	1991, 1992	1988, 1996
(Argentina) Independiente	2	1	1994, 1995	1989
(Argentina) Racing	1	1	1988	1992
(Argentina) Boca Juniors	1	1	1989	1994
(Brazil) São Paulo	1	1	1993	1997
(Argentina) River Plate	1	1	1997	1991
(Paraguay) Olimpia	1	0	1990	—
(Argentina) Vélez Sársfield	1	0	1996	—
(Brazil) Flamengo	0	2	—	1993, 1995
(Uruguay) Nacional	0	1	—	1990

=== Performance by country ===
Nation	Winner	Runners-Up	Winning Clubs	Runners-Up
Argentina	6	4	Independiente (2), Racing (1), Boca Juniors (1), River Plate (1), Vélez Sársfield (1)	Independiente (1), River Plate (1), Racing (1), Boca Juniors (1)
Brazil	3	5	Cruzeiro (2), São Paulo (1)	Cruzeiro (2), Flamengo (2), São Paulo (1)
Paraguay	1	0	Olimpia (1)	—
Uruguay	0	1	—	Nacional (1)

== See also ==
- List of Copa Libertadores winners
