= Cleisson =

Brazilian footballer (born 1972)

Personal information
- Full name: Cleisson Édson Assunção
- Date of birth: 13 March 1972 (age 54)
- Place of birth: Belo Horizonte, Brazil
- Height: 1.81 m (5 ft 11 in)
- Positions: Midfielder; forward

Youth career
- Santa Tereza
- Cruzeiro

Senior career*
| Years | Team | Apps | (Gls) |
| 1992–1997 | Cruzeiro | 279 | (89) |
| 1994 | → Belenenses (loan) | | |
| 1995 | → Vitória (loan) | | |
| 1998–1999 | Flamengo | 44 | (6) |
| 1999 | Grêmio | | |
| 2000–2003 | Atlético Mineiro | 109 | (1) |
| 2003–2004 | Brasiliense | | |
| 2004 | Sport Recife | | |
| 2005 | Náutico | | |
| 2006 | Pogoń Szczecin | 6 | (1) |
| 2006 | Náutico | | |
| 2006 | Portuguesa | | |
| 2007 | Santa Cruz | | |
| 2007 | Caxias | | |
| 2007 | Gama | | |
| 2008 | Ceará | | |
| 2009 | América-RN | | |
| 2009 | Fortaleza | | |

Managerial career
- 2012: Guarany de Sobral
- * Club domestic league appearances and goals

Cleisson Édson Assunção (born 13 March 1972), simply known as Cleisson, is a Brazilian former professional footballer who played as a midfielder and forward.

== Career ==
Revealed by Santa Tereza, a training club in Belo Horizonte, it caught the attention of Cruzeiro. He was the team's top scorer in the Copa do Brasil title with six goals, in addition to participating in numerous other victories, the most notable being the 1997 Copa Libertadores. He transferred to Flamengo in 1998 and started playing in midfield there, becoming known for his violence in tackles. He was elected the most hated player in Brazilian football by Revista Placar in the period.

In 2000, while defending Atlético Mineiro in a Copa Libertadores match, he spat in the face of Adilson Batista, Corinthians defender. In 2005, Cleisson was hired by Sport, the club where Adilson began his career as manager. Both became friends until today, overcoming their disagreement.

In July 2009, after winning the state championship with Fortaleza, he announced his retirement. In 2012 he had experience as a coach at Guarany de Sobral.

== Honours ==
Cruzeiro

- Copa Libertadores: 1997
- Copa do Brasil: 1993, 1996
- Copa Master de Supercopa: 1995
- Supercopa Libertadores: 1992
- Copa de Oro: 1995
- Campeonato Mineiro: 1992, 1996, 1997

Flamengo

- Campeonato Carioca: 1999
- Taça Guanabara: 1999

Atlético Mineiro

- Campeonato Mineiro: 2000

Brasiliense

- Campeonato Brasiliense: 2004

Fortaleza

- Campeonato Cearense: 2009
