= Nonato (footballer, born 1967) =

Brazilian footballer

Personal information
- Full name: Raimundo Nonato da Silva
- Date of birth: 23 February 1967 (age 59)
- Place of birth: Mossoró, Brazil
- Height: 1.69 m (5 ft 7 in)
- Position: Left back

Youth career
- –1985: Baraúnas

Senior career*
Years	Team	Apps	(Gls)
1985–1988	Baraúnas		
1988–1990	ABC		
1990	Pouso Alegre		
1990	→ Cruzeiro (loan)	18	(0)
1991–1997	Cruzeiro	368	(20)
1998–1999	Fluminense	51	(2)
1999	Etti Jundiaí		
2000	Villa Nova		
2000	Ipatinga		
2002	América de Natal		
2002	ABC		

International career
1993	Brazil	3	(0)
- * Club domestic league appearances and goals as of 26 October 2023

Raimundo Nonato da Silva (born 23 February 1967), simply known as Nonato, is a Brazilian former professional footballer who played as a left back.

== Career ==
Nonato began his career at Baraúnas and also played for ABC and Pouso Alegre until arriving at Cruzeiro, where he would become one of the players who made the most appearances for the club, with 386 in total. He is also one of the players who has won the most titles, becoming one of the greatest players in the club's history.

== International career ==
For the Brazil national team, Nonato played in the three matches of the 1993 U.S. Cup.

== Honours ==
Cruzeiro

- Supercopa Libertadores: 1991, 1992
- Copa dos Campeões Mineiros: 1991
- Campeonato Mineiro: 1992, 1994, 1996, 1997
- Copa do Brasil: 1993, 1996
- Copa de Oro: 1995
- Copa Master de Supercopa: 1995
- Copa Libertadores: 1997

Paulista

- Copa Paulista: 1999
