= Célio Lúcio =

Brazilian footballer and coach (born 1971)

Personal information
- Full name: Célio Lúcio da Costa Quarto
- Date of birth: 11 February 1971 (age 55)
- Place of birth: Cajuri, Brazil
- Height: 1.81 m (5 ft 11 in)
- Position: Centre back

Team information
- Current team: Goiás U20 (manager)

Youth career
- 1985–1991: Cruzeiro

Senior career*
Years	Team	Apps	(Gls)
1991–1997	Cruzeiro	172	(2)
1995	→ Palmeiras (loan)	27	(0)
1997–2000	Braga	11	(0)
1998	→ Coritiba (loan)	14	(1)
2000	→ Rio Branco-SP (loan)		
2001–2002	América Mineiro		
2002	Goiás	0	(0)
2003	Ipatinga		
2003	Olympic		
2004	União Rondonópolis		

Managerial career
- 2005–2006: Francana U20 (assistant)
- 2009: Social (assistant)
- 2009: Mamoré (assistant)
- 2010: Metropolitano (assistant)
- 2011: Araxá (assistant)
- 2011–2019: Cruzeiro U20 (assistant)
- 2019–2020: Cruzeiro U20
- 2020–2021: Cruzeiro (assistant)
- 2020: Cruzeiro (interim)
- 2021: Cruzeiro (interim)
- 2022–: Goiás U20
- * Club domestic league appearances and goals

Célio Lúcio da Costa Quarto (born 11 February 1971), known as Célio Lúcio, is a Brazilian football manager and former player who played as a central defender. He is the current manager of Goiás' under-20 squad.

== Playing career ==
Born in Cajuri, Minas Gerais, Célio Lúcio was a Cruzeiro youth graduate. After making his first team debut in 1991, he subsequently became a starter and helped the club to win two Copa do Brasil and the 1997 Copa Libertadores; in the meantime, he also spent the 1995 season on loan at Palmeiras.

Célio Lúcio moved abroad in late 1997, joining S.C. Braga in Portugal, but returned to Brazil in July 1998 after signing for Coritiba on loan. After returning from loan, he spent a year without playing before joining Rio Branco-SP in 2000, but still owned by Braga.

Célio Lúcio subsequently represented América Mineiro, Goiás, Ipatinga, Olympic and União Rondonópolis, retiring with the latter in 2004 at the age of 33.

== Manager career ==
Shortly after retiring, Célio Lúcio started working as an assistant manager, his first side being the under-20s of Francana, in 2005. He then worked for local sides before joining Cléber's staff at Metropolitano in 2010; the duo also worked together at Araxá in 2011.

Célio Lúcio returned to Cruzeiro in June 2011, as an assistant manager of the under-20 side. He was named manager of the category in 2019, but was named assistant of the main squad in January 2020.

During the 2020 campaign, Célio Lúcio also worked as an interim manager on two occasions, after the departures of Ney Franco and Luiz Felipe Scolari.

== Honours ==
=== Player ===
Cruzeiro

- Campeonato Mineiro: 1992, 1994, 1996, 1997
- Supercopa Libertadores: 1992
- Copa do Brasil: 1993, 1996
- Copa Libertadores: 1997
