= Luizinho (footballer, born 1958) =

Brazilian footballer

Personal information
- Full name: Luiz Carlos Ferreira
- Date of birth: October 22, 1958 (age 68)
- Place of birth: Nova Lima, Brazil
- Height: 1.77 m (5 ft 9 1/2 in)
- Position: Defender

Senior career*
Years	Team	Apps	(Gls)
1975–1977	Villa Nova		
1978–1989	Atlético Mineiro	537	(21)
1989–1992	Sporting	82	(3)
1992–1994	Cruzeiro		
1995–1996	Villa Nova		

International career
1980–1983	Brazil	34	(2)
- * Club domestic league appearances and goals

Luiz Carlos Ferreira (born 22 October 1958), known as Luizinho, is a Brazilian former footballer who played as a defender.

== Career ==
During his career which spanned the years from 1975 to 1996 he played initially for Villa Nova of Nova Lima, before he moved to the state capital Belo Horizonte where he won with Atlético Mineiro between 1978 and 1989 eight times the State Championship of Minas Gerais.

After a three-year spell from 1989 until 1992 in Portugal with Sporting CP of Lisbon he returned to Brazil and won the 1993 Brazilian Cup with Cruzeiro and in 1994 once more the Campeonato Mineiro.

For the Brazil national football team he played from August 1980 to June 1983 in 32 international matches, scoring two goals. He also played in all of the five matches of Brazil in the 1982 World Cup in Spain, including the memorable match in which Italy prevailed in the match to progress into the semifinal. Luizinho was selected for the All Star Team of the tournament as best player in his position.

== Honours ==
=== Club ===
Villa Nova

- Torneio Incentivo Mineiro: 1976
- Taça Minas Gerais: 1977
- Campeonato Mineiro Módulo II: 1995

Atlético Mineiro

- Copa dos Campeões da Copa Brasil: 1978
- Campeonato Mineiro: 1978, 1979, 1980, 1981, 1982, 1985, 1986, 1989
- Taça Minas Gerais: 1979, 1986, 1987

Cruzeiro

- Supercopa Libertadores: 1992
- Copa do Brasil: 1993
- Campeonato Mineiro: 1994

=== Individual ===
- Bola de Prata: 1980, 1987
- FIFA World Cup All-Star Team: 1982
