= Douglas (footballer, born 1963) =

Brazilian footballer

Personal information
- Full name: William Douglas Humia Menezes
- Date of birth: 1 March 1963 (age 63)
- Place of birth: Belo Horizonte, Brazil
- Height: 1.79 m (5 ft 10 in)
- Position: Defensive midfielder

Youth career
- –1981: Cruzeiro

Senior career*
Years	Team	Apps	(Gls)
1981–1987	Cruzeiro	340	(7)
1988	Portuguesa	9	(1)
1989–1991	Sporting		
1992–1994	Cruzeiro	51	(5)
1995	Ponte Preta		

International career
1983	Brazil U20		
1983–1987	Brazil	11	(0)
1987	Brazil Olympic	9	(0)
Medal record
Men's Football
Representing Brazil
Pan American Games
Winner	1987 Indianapolis
- * Club domestic league appearances and goals

William Douglas Humia Menezes (born 1 March 1963), known as just Douglas, is a Brazilian former footballer who played as a defensive midfielder. He made eleven appearances for the Brazil national team in 1987. He was also part of Brazil's squad for the 1987 Copa América tournament.

== Honours ==
Cruzeiro

- Campeonato Mineiro: 1984, 1987, 1992, 1994
- Supercopa Libertadores: 1992
- Copa do Brasil: 1993

Brazil U20

- Toulon Tournament: 1983

Brazil Olympic

- Pan American Games: 1987
- CONMEBOL Pre-Olympic Tournament: 1987
