= Diego Soñora =

Argentine footballer

Personal information
- Full name: Diego Luis Soñora
- Date of birth: 17 July 1969 (age 57)
- Place of birth: Buenos Aires, Argentina
- Positions: Defender; midfielder

Senior career*
Years	Team	Apps	(Gls)
1988–1995	Boca Juniors	202	(3)
1996–1997	Dallas Burn	47	(3)
1998	MetroStars	30	(3)
1999	D.C. United	27	(1)
2000–2001	Deportes Concepción		
2001	Tampa Bay Mutiny	4	(0)
2002	Cerro Porteño		
?	Defensores de Belgrano		
- * Club domestic league appearances and goals as of 27 November 2011

Diego Luis Soñora (born 17 July 1969 in Buenos Aires) is an Argentine former professional footballer who played as a defender or midfielder. He is the father of Alan Soñora and Joel Soñora.

== Career ==
Soñora, nicknamed "Chiche", spent a large part of his career with Argentine giants Boca Juniors where he won 5 titles between 1988 and 1995. Soñora played a total of 266 games for Boca in all competitions, scoring 5 goals.

In 1996 Soñora moved to Major League Soccer's Dallas Burn for the league's inaugural season, 1996. He would play two seasons for Dallas, before a switch to the MetroStars in 1998. A season later, he was sent to D.C. United and helped them to the 1999 MLS Cup. Soñora left MLS after that season, and played in Chile for Deportes Concepción before a short return to the US and Tampa Bay Mutiny in 2001. He then joined Cerro Porteño of Paraguay before returning to Argentina to play for lower league side Defensores de Belgrano, before retiring as a player.

In MLS, Soñora was an All-Star in his first three seasons in the league, and scored a total of seven goals and 21 assists.

== Personal life ==
Soñora has two footballing sons in Alan and Joel. Alan started his senior career with Independiente, while Joel played for the United States at youth level and signed with Germany's VfB Stuttgart in 2016.

== Honours ==
Boca Juniors

- Supercopa Libertadores: 1989
- Recopa Sudamericana: 1990
- Argentine Primera División: Apertura 1992
- Copa Master de Supercopa: 1992
- Copa de Oro: 1993

Dallas Burn

- U.S. Open Cup: 1997

DC United

- MLS Cup: 1999

Individual

- MLS All Star: 1996, 1997, 1998
