= San–São =

Brazilian football derby

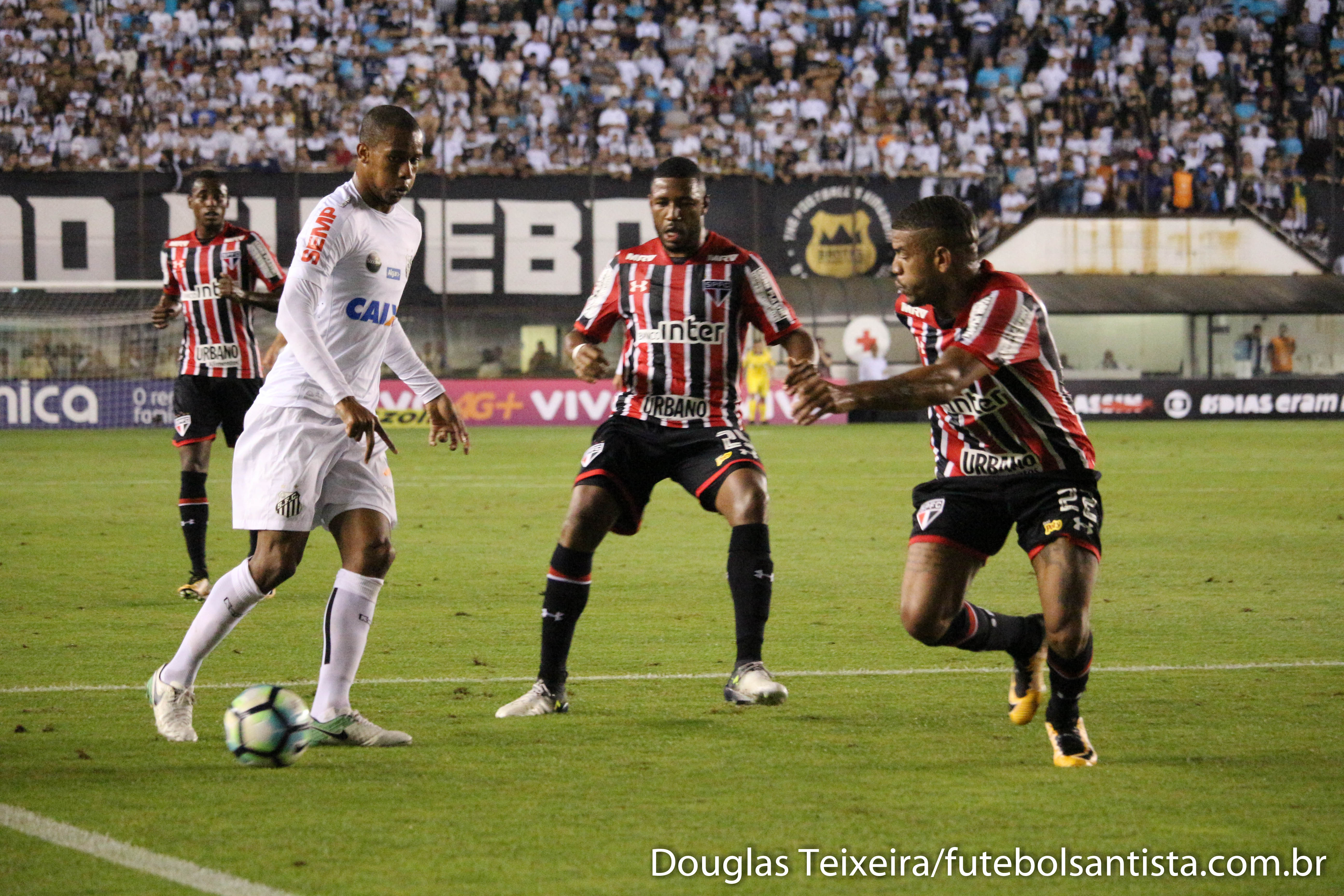
- Santos v São Paulo, Campeonato Brasileiro Série A, 9 July 2017

- Santos São Paulo
- Location: State of São Paulo
- First meeting: 11 May 1930; Campeonato Paulista; Santos 2–2 São Paulo
- Latest meeting: 2 October 2026; Brazilian Série A São Paulo 1–2 Santos
- Stadiums: Vila Belmiro (Santos); Morumbi (São Paulo)

Statistics
- Total meetings: 329
- Most wins: São Paulo (141)
- Top scorer: Pelé (31)
- All-time series: Santos: 111; Drawn: 77; São Paulo: 141
- Largest victory: São Paulo 9–1 Santos; Campeonato Paulista; 18 June 1944

The San–São is the name of the Santos FC and São Paulo FC football derby, contested between two of the most successful clubs in Brazilian football. Because of the historical success of the two clubs, both are considered by many fans to be the biggest clubs in Brazil, and their derby is considered one of the biggest of the state of São Paulo.

== Statistics ==
=== Head-to-head statistics ===
As of 2 October 2026

Competition	Played	Santos wins	Draws	São Paulo wins	Santos goals	São Paulo goals
Copa Sudamericana	2	1	1	0	2	1
Supercopa Libertadores	2	0	1	1	2	5
Campeonato Brasileiro Série A	81	30	19	32	102	100
Copa do Brasil	2	2	0	0	6	2
Torneio dos Campeões	2	0	0	2	0	2
Torneio Rio–São Paulo	20	8	3	9	39	43
Campeonato Paulista (Note: In 1933, two matches were simultaneously valid for the Torneio Rio-São Paulo and for the Campeonato Paulista of that season. Both of them were won by São Paulo, the first by 4–1 and the second, 6–2. In this table, those matches are only being considered as Torneio Rio-São Paulo games so they are not counted twice.)	182	55	48	79	254	321
Other	38	15	5	18	60	67
Total	329	111	77	141	465	541

Source: Goal.com Brasil

=== Largest victories ===
- São Paulo 9–1 Santos; 18 June 1944; Campeonato Paulista
- Santos 6–2 São Paulo; 7 March 1963; Torneio Rio-São Paulo

=== Decisive games ===
==== List of finals between the clubs ====
Season	Competition	Date	Match	Score	Winner
1956	Campeonato Paulista	3 January 1957	Santos – São Paulo	4–2	Santos
1967	Campeonato Paulista	21 December 1967	Santos – São Paulo	2–1	Santos
1978	Campeonato Paulista	20 June 1979	São Paulo – Santos	1–2	Santos
1978	Campeonato Paulista	24 June 1979	Santos – São Paulo	1–1	Santos
1978	Campeonato Paulista	28 June 1979	Santos – São Paulo	0–2*	Santos
1980	Campeonato Paulista	16 November 1980	Santos – São Paulo	0–1	São Paulo
1980	Campeonato Paulista	19 November 1980	São Paulo – Santos	1–0	São Paulo
2000	Campeonato Paulista	10 June 2000	Santos – São Paulo	0–1	São Paulo
2000	Campeonato Paulista	18 June 2000	São Paulo – Santos	2–2	São Paulo

Note (*): As São Paulo won the third match 2–0 at the regular time, the finals went to extra-time, in which Santos had the advantage in case of a tie due to their better campaign in the championship. As it ended 0–0, Santos were proclaimed the champions.

- Finals won: Santos 3, São Paulo 2.

==== Other meetings in knock-out stages ====
Season	Competition	Phase	Winner
1978	Campeonato Paulista	Quarter-finals*	Santos
1981	Campeonato Brasileiro	Round of 16	São Paulo
1983	Campeonato Paulista	Semi-finals	São Paulo
1990	Campeonato Brasileiro	Quarter-finals	São Paulo
1992	Supercopa Libertadores	Round of 16	São Paulo
2002	Campeonato Brasileiro	Quarter-finals	Santos
2004	Copa Sudamericana	2nd round	Santos
2010	Campeonato Paulista	Semi-finals	Santos
2011	Campeonato Paulista	Semi-finals	Santos
2012	Campeonato Paulista	Semi-finals	Santos
2015	Campeonato Paulista	Semi-finals	Santos
2015	Copa do Brasil	Semi-finals	Santos

Note (*): Quarter-finals of the 1st turno (phase) of the championship.

- Series won: Santos 8, São Paulo 4.

=== Titles comparison ===
Type	Competitions	Santos	São Paulo
Worldwide	FIFA Club World Cup*	—	1
Intercontinental	Intercontinental Cup*	2	2
Intercontinental	Intercontinental Champions' Supercup	1	—
Continental	Copa Libertadores	3	3
Continental	Copa Sudamericana	—	1
Continental	Recopa Sudamericana	1	2
Continental	Supercopa Libertadores	—	1
Continental	Copa Conmebol	1	1
Continental	Copa Master de CONMEBOL	—	1
National	Campeonato Brasileiro	8	6
National	Copa do Brasil	1	1
National	Supercopa do Brasil	—	1
Inter-state	Torneio Rio–São Paulo	5	1
State	Campeonato Paulista	22	22
State	Supercampeonato Paulista	—	1
Total		44	44

Note (*): Although the Intercontinental Cup and the FIFA Club World Cup are officially different tournaments, in Brazil they are treated many times as the same tournament.
