= Luis Abramovich =

Argentine footballer

Personal information
- Full name: Luis Ernesto Abramovich
- Date of birth: 1962 (age 63–64)
- Place of birth: Argentina
- Position: Defender

Senior career*
Years	Team	Apps	(Gls)
1982–1985	Chacarita Juniors	168 (total)	(0)
1985–1992	Boca Juniors	158	(2)
1992–1993	Racing Club	7	(1)
1993–1995	Club Atlético Belgrano	47	(0)
1995–1996	Chacarita Juniors	(see above)	
- * Club domestic league appearances and goals

Luis Abramovich (born 1962) is an Argentine former footballer. While playing for Boca Juniors he won many titles including the Recopa Sudamericana, Supercopa Sudamericana and the Supercopa Masters. He played a total of 200 games for Boca in all competitions, scoring 5 goals. He was never a soccer coach, but he has always dreamed of directing. Apparently, he had the opportunity in the minor divisions of his hometown. But his aspirations transcend and he seeks to demonstrate his experiences as a player in a first-class team. He is an accredited technician according to the AFA.
