= Jorge Borelli =

Argentine footballer and manager

Personal information
- Full name: Jorge Horacio Borelli
- Date of birth: 2 November 1964 (age 61)
- Place of birth: Buenos Aires, Argentina
- Height: 1.80 m (5 ft 11 in)
- Position: Defender

Team information
- Current team: Tigre (assistant)

Senior career*
Years	Team	Apps	(Gls)
1980–1985	Platense	58	(1)
1985–1989	River Plate	107	(2)
1989–1991	Tigres UANL	42	(4)
1991–1994	Racing Club	111	(7)
1995–1997	San Lorenzo	9	(0)
Total		327	(14)

International career
1983	Argentina U20	4	(1)
1992–1994	Argentina	13	(0)

Managerial career
- San Lorenzo (assistant)
- 2002–2003: Nueva Chicago (assistant)
- 2004–2005: Lanús (assistant)
- 2006–2007: Rosario Central (assistant)
- 2007–2008: Argentinos Juniors (assistant)
- 2009: River Plate (assistant)
- 2011–2012: Argentinos Juniors (assistant)
- 2012: Argentinos Juniors (caretaker)
- 2015–2016: Almería (assistant)
- 2019–: Tigre (assistant)
Medal record
Men's football
Representing Argentina
Copa América
Winner	1993 Ecuador
FIFA Confederations Cup
Winner	1992 Saudi Arabia
CONMEBOL–UEFA Cup of Champions
Winner	1993 Argentina
- * Club domestic league appearances and goals

Jorge Horacio Borelli (born 2 November 1964) is an Argentine football manager and former player who is assistant manager of Tigre.

== Playing career ==
Borelli was born in Buenos Aires. He played in the defence at both club and international levels. With the Argentina national team, he featured in the team's victorious 1993 Copa América campaign in Ecuador, and at the 1994 FIFA World Cup in the United States.

Borelli began his career at Platense in 1980, he soon came to the attention of River Plate and signed for the Argentine giants in 1985. In his time at River he helped the club to win the 1985-1986 Primera, their first Copa Libertadores, the Copa Intercontinental and the Copa Interamericana. In 1989, he left River to play for UANL Tigres but in 1991 he returned to Argentina to play for Racing Club de Avellaneda. In 1994, he moved to Club Atlético San Lorenzo de Almagro where he won the Clausura 1995 tournament. Borelli retired as a player in 1996.

== Coaching career ==
After retiring, Borelli became the assistant manager of San Lorenzo. In the 2002–03 season, Borelli was the assistant manager of Néstor Gorosito at Nueva Chicago. In December 2004, he followed Gorosito when he was appointed as manager of Club Atlético Lanús.

In December 2015, Gorosito was appointed as manager of Spanish club UD Almería and took Borelli with him as his assistant.

On 12 February 2019, Borelli was appointed as the assistant manager of Gorosito at Tigre.

== Personal life ==
Borelli was born in Argentina and is of Italian descent. His son Éder Borelli, and father-in-law Vladislao Cap also played football professionally.

== Honours ==
River Plate

- Primera Division Argentina: 1985–86
- Copa Libertadores: 1986
- Intercontinental Cup: 1986
- Copa Interamericana: 1987

Racing

- Supercopa Libertadores runner-up: 1992

San Lorenzo

- Primera Division Argentina: Clausura 1995

Argentina

- FIFA Confederations Cup: 1992
- Copa América: 1993
- Artemio Franchi Trophy: 1993
