= Paulão (footballer, born 1968) =

Brazilian footballer

Personal information
- Full name: Paulo César Batista dos Santos
- Date of birth: 24 March 1968 (age 58)
- Place of birth: Itambacuri, Minas Gerais, Brazil
- Height: 1.80 m (5 ft 11 in)
- Position: Centre back

Youth career
- Cruzeiro

Senior career*
Years	Team	Apps	(Gls)
1988−1992	Cruzeiro	55	(5)
1992−1994	Grêmio	13	(3)
1994−1995	Benfica	4	(0)
1995	Vasco da Gama		
1995−1996	Atlético Mineiro	14	(1)
1996	Guarani		
1996	Atlético Paranaense		
1997	Colo-Colo	0	(0)
1998	Inter de Limeira		
1998−1999	Ponte Preta	11	(0)

International career
1990−1992	Brazil	8	(0)
- * Club domestic league appearances and goals as of 22 September 2014

Paulo César Batista dos Santos (born 24 March 1968), known just as Paulão, is a former Brazilian footballer who played as a centre back.

An international for Brazil from 1990 to 1992, Paulão gained notability at Cruzeiro and Grêmio, where he won the 1994 Copa do Brasil with the Porto Alegre-side.

== Career ==
Born in Itambacuri, Minas Gerais, Paulão started at Cruzeiro where he made his breakthrough, winning two Campeonato Mineiro in 1990 and 1992. He played alongside Adílson Batista, Paulo Roberto, Ademir and Ramon Menezes. Due to his performances at Cruzeiro, he received a call-up for the national team by Paulo Roberto Falcão in 1990. He made his debut on 12 September 1990 against Spain and his last on 16 December 1992, against Germany, counting eight caps during those two years; he still was part of the squad for the 1993 Copa América, but did not play.

In 1992, he moved to Grêmio, competing in the Supercopa Libertadores, lost to his former team, but winning the 1994 Copa do Brasil and the 1994 Campeonato Gaúcho. In 1994, he joined Benfica, intended as future replacement for Carlos Mozer. He made his debut on 21 August 1994 in a first tier match against Beira-Mar, and appeared regularly until late September, when he was sidelined in favour of Mozer.

He left the club in December 1994, signing with Vasco da Gama but stayed only one year, becoming a journeyman in next four years, passing through five clubs, before retiring. In 2007, he worked as assistant manager with Dorival Júnior, who was quoted saying: "I know Paulão, he used to play alongside me [at Grêmio] and is a person of my total confidence."

== Honours ==
Cruzeiro

- Campeonato Mineiro: 1990, 1992

Grêmio

- Campeonato Gaúcho: 1993
- Copa do Brasil: 1994

Colo-Colo

- Primera División de Chile (2): 1996, 1997 Clausura
