= Luís Fernando Flores =

Brazilian footballer (born 1964)

Luís Fernando
Personal information
- Full name: Luís Fernando Rosa Flores
- Date of birth: 31 August 1964 (age 62)
- Place of birth: Bagé, Brazil
- Height: 1.70 m (5 ft 7 in)
- Position: Attacking midfielder

Youth career
- Guarany de Bagé

Senior career*
Years	Team	Apps	(Gls)
1980–1982	Guarany de Bagé		
1981–1982	→ Atlético Carazinho (loan)		
1983	Esportivo		
1983–1984	Inter de Santa Maria		
1984	Pelotas		
1985	Botafogo-PB		
1985–1986	Caxias		
1986–1989	Internacional		
1990	Bahia		
1990–1997	Cruzeiro	202	(33)
1995	→ Marítimo (loan)	23	(1)
1998	Villa Nova		
1998	ABC		
2000	Rio Grande		
- * Club domestic league appearances and goals as of 7 January 2024

Luís Fernando Rosa Flores (born 31 August 1964), better known as Luís Fernando or Luís Fernando Flores, is a Brazilian former professional footballer who played as an attacking midfielder.

== Career ==
Born in Bagé, Luís Fernando started at Guarany, and played in the first part of his career in clubs in Rio Grande do Sul. He also had a spell at Botafogo-PB and in 1986 he joined Internacional.

He played for Bahia in the early 90s and then played for Cruzeiro, where he played 202 matches, scored 33 goals, in addition to winning several titles. He also had a brief spell in Portugal at CS Marítimo, on loan, in 1995.

== Managerial career ==
Luís Fernando became Enderson Moreira technical assistant, working alongside him at several clubs.

== Honours ==
Cruzeiro

- Supercopa Libertadores: 1991, 1992
- Copa Master de Supercopa: 1995
- Campeonato Mineiro: 1992, 1994, 1996
- Copa do Brasil: 1993, 1996
