= Paulo César Borges =

Brazilian footballer (born 1960)

Personal information
- Full name: Paulo César Borges
- Date of birth: 6 March 1960 (age 66)
- Place of birth: Fronteira, Brazil
- Height: 1.81 m (5 ft 11 in)
- Position: Goalkeeper

Youth career
- 1977–1980: Marília

Senior career*
Years	Team	Apps	(Gls)
1980	Marília		
1981–1984	América-SP		
1985–1987	Sport Recife		
1987	América-SP		
1988	Catanduvense		
1989	Bragantino		
1989–1993	Cruzeiro	242	(0)
1994–1995	Portuguesa		
1995	Flamengo	28	(0)
1996	Guarani		
1997	Atlético Mineiro	22	(0)
1998	Cruzeiro	15	(0)
1999	Araçatuba		

International career
1979	Brazil U20		
- * Club domestic league appearances and goals as of 30 November 2023

Paulo César Borges (born 6 March 1960), is a Brazilian former professional footballer who played as a goalkeeper.

== Career ==
Paulo César started his career at Marilia, where he stood out at the base, even defending the Brazil under-20 team in the 1979 South American U-20 Championship. He played in the following years at América-SP, and later at Sport Recife, leaving in 1987 due to disagreements with coach Emerson Leão.

He returned to América, and then played for Catanduvense and Bragantino, until arriving at Cruzeiro, the club where he won the Supercopa Libertadores twice, as well as the Copa do Brasil in 1993. He had a quick spell at Portuguesa and arrived at Flamengo in the centenary year from the club in 1995, which was facing problems in goal.

In 1997 he would play for Atlético Mineiro, winning the CONMEBOL Cup, managed by Emerson Leão, with whom he made peace. In 1998, he returned to Cruzeiro as state champion, this time as André Doring reserve. He would play in the final of the 1998 Copa do Brasil, being considered largely responsible for the defeat. He went to AE Araçatuba in 1999 to compete in the Campeonato Paulista, and retired at the end of the competition.

== Honours ==
Marília

- Copa São Paulo de Futebol Jr.: 1979

América

- Torneio José Maria Marín: 1987

Cruzeiro

- Supercopa Libertadores: 1991, 1992
- Copa do Brasil: 1993
- Campeonato Mineiro: 1990, 1992, 1998

Atlético Mineiro

- Copa CONMEBOL: 1997
