= Adilson Batista =

Brazilian footballer (born 1968)

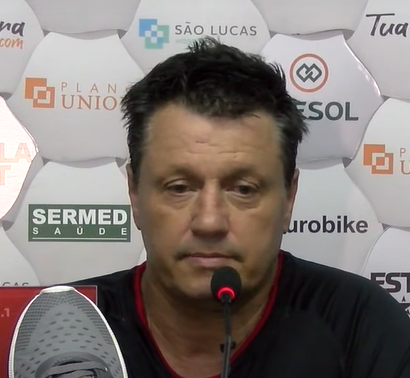
- Batista in 2023

Personal information
- Full name: Adilson Dias Batista
- Date of birth: 16 March 1968 (age 58)
- Place of birth: Adrianópolis, Brazil
- Height: 1.83 m (6 ft 0 in)
- Position: Centre back

Youth career
- Atlético Paranaense

Senior career*
Years	Team	Apps	(Gls)
1987–1989	Atlético Paranaense	21	(1)
1989–1993	Cruzeiro	51	(5)
1993	Internacional	11	(2)
1994	Atlético Mineiro	19	(2)
1994–1996	Grêmio	30	(2)
1997–1999	Júbilo Iwata	52	(10)
2000	Corinthians	5	(0)

International career
1990–1991	Brazil	4	(0)

Managerial career
- 2001: Mogi Mirim
- 2002: América-RN
- 2002: Avaí
- 2003: Paraná
- 2003–2004: Grêmio
- 2004: Paysandu
- 2005: Sport Recife
- 2005–2006: Figueirense
- 2006–2007: Júbilo Iwata
- 2008–2010: Cruzeiro
- 2010: Corinthians
- 2011: Santos
- 2011: Atlético Paranaense
- 2011: São Paulo
- 2012: Atlético Goianiense
- 2013: Figueirense
- 2013–2014: Vasco da Gama
- 2015: Joinville
- 2018: América Mineiro
- 2019: Ceará
- 2019–2020: Cruzeiro
- 2022: Londrina
- 2023: Botafogo-SP
- 2024: Amazonas
- * Club domestic league appearances and goals

Adilson Dias Batista (born 16 March 1968) is a Brazilian professional football coach and former player.

His professional playing career as a centre-back spanned 13 years, during which he was mainly associated with Cruzeiro and Grêmio. Adilson also represented the Brazil national team in four occasions.

== Playing career ==
Born in Adrianópolis, Paraná, he was known as Adilson during his playing days, and finished his formation with Atlético Paranaense. Promoted to the first-team in 1987 by head coach Levir Culpi, he was a regular starter before moving to Cruzeiro in 1989.

Adilson subsequently represented Internacional, Atlético Mineiro and Grêmio before moving abroad in 1997 and joining Júbilo Iwata. He returned to his home country in 2000, signing for Corinthians and retiring with the club shortly after.

== Coaching career ==
Batista started his coaching career with Mogi Mirim in 2001. In the following season, he was in charge of América-RN and Avaí.

On 27 May 2003, Batista was named head coach of Paraná in the Série A, but moved to fellow league team Grêmio on 22 August. On 4 June 2004, he was dismissed by the latter.

Batista subsequently took over Paysandu before being appointed head coach of Sport in 2005. Late in the year he was at the helm of Figueirense, but returned to Japan and Júbilo Iwata in 2006.

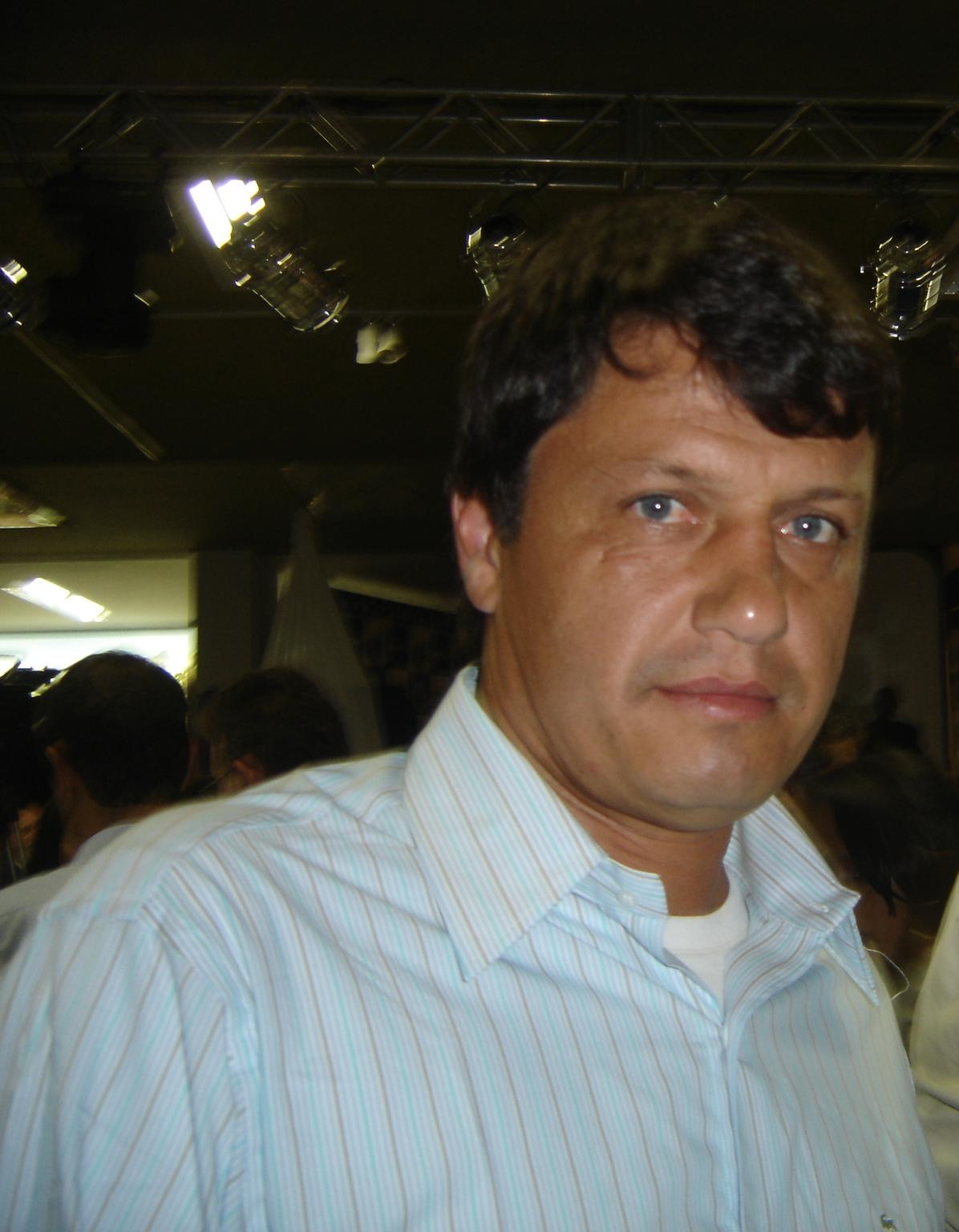
Batista in 2009

On 6 December 2007, Batista was appointed head coach of another club he represented as a player, Cruzeiro. With the club he reached the finals of the 2009 Copa Libertadores, losing it to Estudiantes. On 3 June 2010, he announced his resignation.

On 24 July 2010, Batista replaced Mano Menezes at the helm of Corinthians. On 10 October, after five winless matches, he stepped down.

On 8 November 2010, Batista was announced as the new Santos head coach for the 2011 season. He was sacked the following 27 February, as the club was struggling in the 2011 Copa Libertadores.

On 5 April 2011, Batista returned to Atlético Paranaense, now as head coach. He resigned on 25 June, and took over São Paulo on 16 July; he was relieved from his duties on 16 October.

On 4 April 2012, Batista was named Atlético Goianiense head coach, being sacked on 30 May despite suffering only one defeat during his tenure. On 8 November, he returned to Figueirense.

On 29 October 2013, Batista was appointed in charge of Vasco da Gama, being sacked the following 30 August. In June 2015, after nearly one year unemployed, he took over Joinville, being relieved from his duties on 26 July.

On 24 July 2018, after nearly three years of inactivity, Batista was named head coach of América Mineiro, being relieved from his duties on 10 November after ten winless matches. On 2 October of the following year, he was appointed in charge of Ceará also in the top tier.

On 28 November 2019, Batista was sacked by Ceará, and returned to Cruzeiro the following day, replacing Abel Braga. He was dismissed by the latter on 15 March 2020, after only one win in his last nine matches at the club.

On 6 March 2022, after nearly two years without coaching, Batista took over Londrina. He left after the season ended, and was named in charge of fellow second division side Botafogo-SP on 23 February 2023.

On 24 June 2023, Batista was dismissed by Pantera. On 16 April of the following year, he replaced Luizinho Vieira at the helm of Amazonas also in division two, but left the club by mutual consent on 23 May, amidst rumours of a return to Cruzeiro as youth coordinator.

== Career statistics ==
=== Club ===
Club performance			League		Cup		League Cup		Total	
Season	Club	League	Apps	Goals	Apps	Goals	Apps	Goals	Apps	Goals
Brazil			League		Copa do Brasil		League Cup		Total	
1988	Atlético Paranaense	Série A	21	1					21	1
1989	Cruzeiro	Série A	10	1					10	1
1990	Cruzeiro	Série A	15	2					15	2
1991	Cruzeiro	Série A	16	2					16	2
1992	Cruzeiro	Série A	10	0					10	0
1993	Cruzeiro	Série A	0	0					0	0
1993	Internacional	Série A	11	2					11	2
1994	Atlético Mineiro	Série A	19	2					19	2
1995	Grêmio	Série A	5	0					5	0
1996	Grêmio	Série A	25	2					25	2
Japan			League		Emperor's Cup		J.League Cup		Total	
1997	Júbilo Iwata	J1 League	22	5	0	0	11	3	33	8
1998	Júbilo Iwata	J1 League	23	5	0	0	4	1	27	6
1999	Júbilo Iwata	J1 League	7	0	0	0	2	0	9	0
Brazil			League		Copa do Brasil		League Cup		Total	
2000	Corinthians Paulista	Série A	5	0					5	0
Country	Brazil		137	12					137	12
Country	Japan		52	10	0	0	17	4	69	14
Total			189	22	0	0	17	4	206	26

=== International ===
Brazil national team
Year	Apps	Goals
1990	3	0
1991	1	0
Total	4	0

== Managerial statistics ==
As of match played 15 June 2025

Managerial record by team and tenure
Team	Nat	From	To	Record							
Team	Nat	From	To	G	W	D	L	GF	GA	GD	Win %
Mogi Mirim	(Brazil)	10 January 2001	20 December 2001	35	13	9	13	55	56	−1	37.14
America-RN	(Brazil)	4 January 2002	28 June 2002	37	15	12	10	52	38	+14	40.54
Avaí	(Brazil)	30 June 2002	20 December 2002	27	14	5	8	41	23	+18	51.85
Paraná	(Brazil)	26 May 2003	16 July 2003	8	3	1	4	18	16	+2	37.50
Grêmio	(Brazil)	22 August 2003	4 June 2004	53	36	6	11	119	50	+69	67.92
Figueirense	(Brazil)	18 August 2005	18 June 2006	54	27	11	16	105	76	+29	50.00
Júbilo Iwata	(Japan)	23 June 2006	9 September 2007	56	27	7	22	104	96	+8	48.21
Cruzeiro	(Brazil)	6 December 2007	3 June 2010	165	93	33	39	312	188	+124	56.36
São Paulo	(Brazil)	17 July 2011	17 October 2011	22	7	9	6	35	30	+5	31.82
Vasco da Gama	(Brazil)	30 October 2013	30 August 2014	51	23	21	7	77	45	+32	45.10
Ceará	(Brazil)	3 October 2019	28 November 2019	13	4	2	7	12	15	−3	30.77
Cruzeiro	(Brazil)	2 December 2019	15 March 2020	12	4	4	4	15	15	+0	33.33
Londrina	(Brazil)	10 March 2022	31 December 2022	40	15	11	14	38	39	−1	37.50
Botafogo-SP	(Brazil)	28 February 2023	24 June 2023	19	6	4	9	14	26	−12	31.58
Amazonas	(Brazil)	19 April 2024	23 May 2024	8	1	2	5	5	11	−6	12.50
Total				600	288	137	175	1,000	724	+276	48.00

== Honours ==
=== Player ===
Atlético Paranaense

- Campeonato Paranaense: 1988

Cruzeiro

- Campeonato Mineiro: 1990, 1992
- Supercopa Libertadores: 1991, 1992

Grêmio

- Campeonato Gaúcho: 1995,1996
- Copa Libertadores: 1995
- Recopa Sudamericana: 1996

Júbilo Iwata

- Asian Champions League: 1998, 1999
- J1 League: 1997, 1999
- J.League Cup: 1998

Corinthians

- FIFA Club World Cup: 2000

=== Coach ===
América-RN

- Campeonato Potiguar: 2002

Figueirense

- Campeonato Catarinense: 2006

Cruzeiro

- Campeonato Mineiro: 2008, 2009

=== Individual ===
- Bola de Prata: 1990
