= 1988 Supercopa Libertadores finals =

1988 Supercopa Libertadores Finals
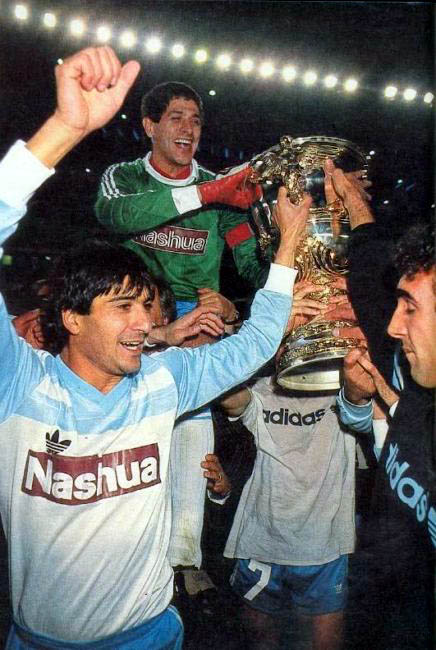
- Racing Club, champions
- Event: 1988 Supercopa Libertadores
Racing	Cruzeiro
(Argentina)	(Brazil)
3	2
- (on aggregate)

First Leg
Racing	Cruzeiro
2	1
- Date: June 13, 1988
- Venue: El Cilindro, Avellaneda
- Referee: Hernán Silva (Chile)

Second Leg
Cruzeiro	Racing
1	1
- Date: June 18, 1988
- Venue: Mineirão, Belo Horizonte
- Referee: Juan Daniel Cardellino (Uruguay)

The 1988 Supercopa Sudamericana Finals was the final of the first edition of Supercopa Libertadores, a continental football tournament. It was contested by Argentine club Racing and Brazilian club Cruzeiro. The first leg of the tie was played at El Cilindro, where Racing beat Cruzeiro 2–1. In the second leg, held in Mineirão in Belo Horizonte, both teams tied 1–1.

Racing Club won the cup 3–1 on points (3–2 on aggregate), achieving their first Supercopa trophy and winning an international title for the first time since 1967.

== Qualified teams ==
Team	Previous final app.
(Argentina) Racing	(none)
(Brazil) Cruzeiro	(none)

== Venues ==
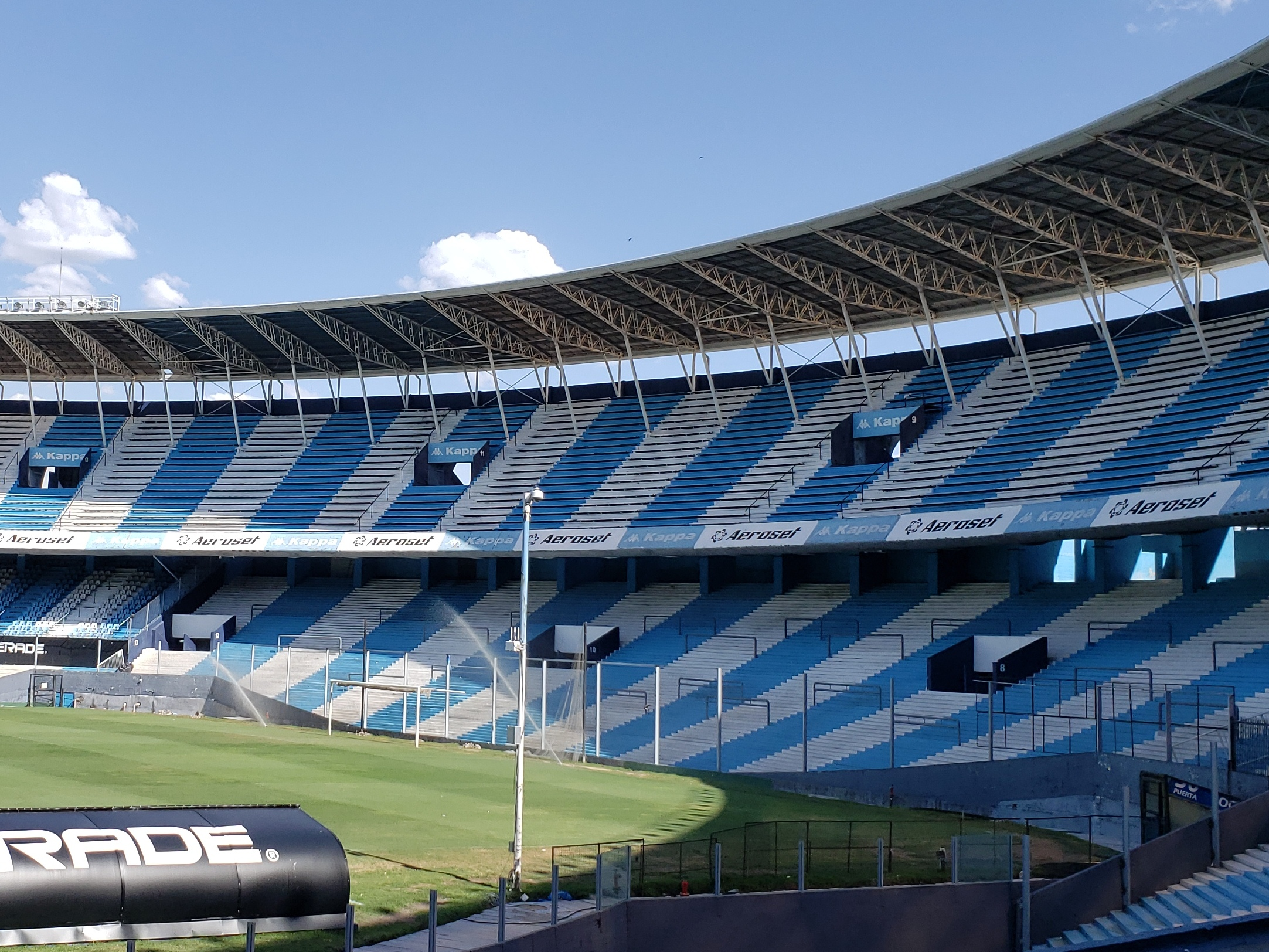
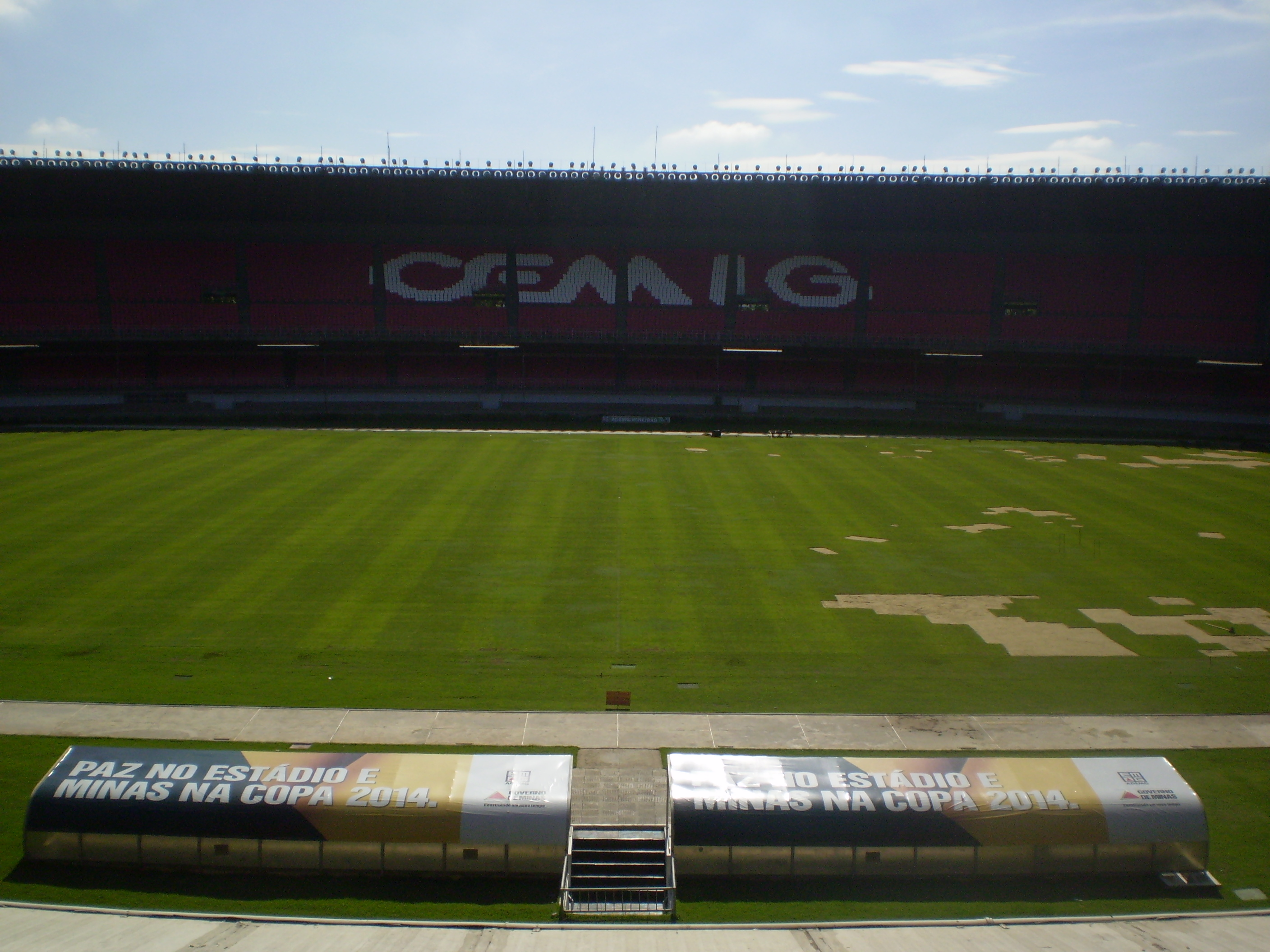
El Cilindro (left) and Mineirao, venues for the series

== Route to the final ==
(Argentina) Racing					(Brazil) Cruzeiro			
Opponent	Agg.	1st leg	2nd leg	Round	Opponent	Agg.	1st leg	2nd leg
(Brazil) Santos	2–0	2–0 (H)	0–0 (A)	First round	(Argentina) Independiente	3–1	2–1 (A)	1–0 (H)
– (Note: Qualified directly to semifinals.)				Quarter-finals	(Argentina) Argentinos Juniors	2–0	1–0 (H)	1–0 (A)
(Argentina) River Plate	3–2	2–1 (H)	1–1 (A)	Semi-finals	(Uruguay) Nacional	3–3 (Note: Won on away goals rule.)	2–3 (A)	1–0 (H)

== Match details ==
=== First leg ===
Some moments of the match held in Avellaneda
1988 Supercopa Libertadores Finals
July 13, 1988
First leg

Racing (Argentina)	2–1	(Brazil) Cruzeiro
Colombatti 43'; W. Fernández 44'		Robson 36'

El Cilindro, Avellaneda
Referee: Hernán Silva (Chile)

Racing Club	Cruzeiro

GK	1	(Argentina) Ubaldo Fillol (c)
RB	4	(Uruguay) Carlos E. Vázquez
DF	2	(Argentina) Gustavo Costas
DF	6	(Argentina) Néstor Fabbri
LB	3	(Argentina) Carlos Olarán
DF	7	(Argentina) Jorge Acuña	(substituted off) 76'
DF	5	(Argentina) Miguel Ángel Ludueña
MF	10	(Argentina) Miguel Ángel Colombatti
MF	8	(Uruguay) Rubén Paz
FW	16	(Argentina) Omar Catalán	(substituted off) 64'
FW	11	(Argentina) Walter Fernández
Substitutes:
FW		(Argentina) Ramón Medina Bello	(substituted on) 64'
MF		(Argentina) Hugo Pérez	(substituted on) 76'
Manager:
(Argentina) Alfio Basile

GK		(Brazil) Wellington
RB		(Brazil) Ronaldinho
DF	24	(Brazil) Gilmar Francisco
DF		(Brazil) Heraldo
LB		(Brazil) Wladimir
DM		(Brazil) Éder
DM	4	(Brazil) Ademir
MF		(Brazil) Heriberto
MF		(Brazil) Anderson	(substituted off) 66'
FW	9	(Brazil) Robson
FW	8	(Brazil) Careca (c)
Substitutes:
LB		(Brazil) Genilson		(substituted on) 66'
Manager:
(Brazil) Carlos Alberto Silva

=== Second leg ===
Some moments of the second leg in Belo Horizonte, including the title celebrations
July 18, 1988
Second leg

Cruzeiro (Brazil)	1–1	(Argentina) Racing
Robson 82'		Catalán 45'

Mineirão, Belo Horizonte
Referee: Juan Daniel Cardellino (Uruguay)

Cruzeiro	Racing Club

GK		(Brazil) Wellington
RB	2	(Brazil) Balu
DF		(Brazil) Gilmar Francisco
DF		(Brazil) Heraldo	(red card) 89'
LB		(Brazil) Wladimir
DM	19	(Brazil) Éder
DM		(Brazil) Ademir
MF		(Brazil) Heriberto	(substituted off) 46'
MF		(Brazil) Anderson
FW	9	(Brazil) Robson
FW	8	(Brazil) Careca (c)
Substitutes:
LB		(Brazil) Ramon	(substituted on) 46'
Manager:
(Brazil) Carlos Alberto Silva

GK	1	(Argentina) Ubaldo Fillol (c)
RB	4	(Uruguay) Carlos E. Vázquez
DF	2	(Argentina) Gustavo Costas
DF	6	(Argentina) Néstor Fabbri
LB	3	(Argentina) Carlos Olarán
DF	7	(Argentina) Jorge Acuña
DF	5	(Argentina) Miguel Ángel Ludueña
MF	10	(Argentina) Miguel Ángel Colombatti	(red card) 89'
MF	8	(Uruguay) Rubén Paz	(substituted off) 79'
FW	16	(Argentina) Omar Catalán	(substituted off) 72'
FW	11	(Argentina) Walter Fernández
Substitutes:
FW		(Argentina) Ramón Medina Bello	(substituted on) 72'
MF		(Argentina) Hugo Pérez	(substituted on) 79'
Manager:
(Argentina) Alfio Basile

== See also ==
- 1988 Supercopa Sudamericana
- 1988 Copa Libertadores Finals
