= Jair Pereira (Brazilian footballer) =

Brazilian football manager and former player

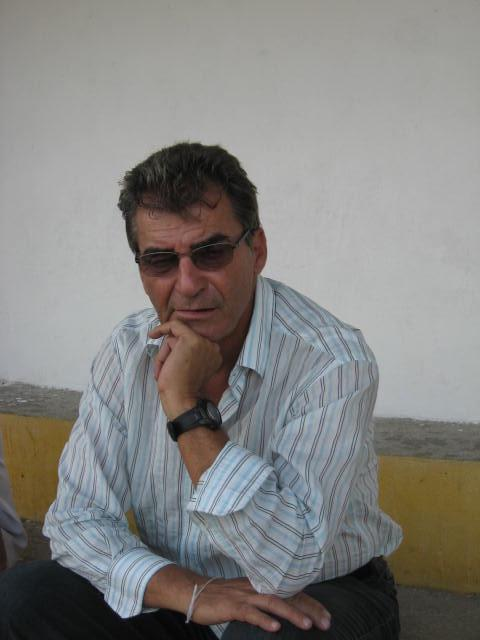

Personal information
- Full name: Jair Pereira da Silva
- Date of birth: 25 May 1946 (age 80)
- Place of birth: Rio de Janeiro, Brazil
- Position: Midfielder

Senior career*
Years	Team	Apps	(Gls)
1966	Madureira		
1967–1969	Flamengo		
1969–1972	Bonsucesso		
1972	Olaria		
1973	Santa Cruz		
1974–1977	Vasco da Gama		
1977–1978	Bangu		

Managerial career
- 1981: Campo Grande
- 1981: Ponte Preta
- 1982: Paysandu
- 1983: Brazil U20
- 1985: America
- 1985: Brazil U20
- 1986: Al-Shabab
- 1986: Al-Jazira
- 1986: Brazil U20
- 1987: Cruzeiro
- 1987: Brazil U20
- 1988: Corinthians
- 1988: Botafogo
- 1989: Atlético Mineiro
- 1990: Palmeiras
- 1990: Flamengo
- 1991–1992: Atlético Mineiro
- 1992: Cruzeiro
- 1993: Atlético Madrid
- 1993: Flamengo
- 1994: Vasco da Gama
- 1994: Corinthians
- 1995: Vasco da Gama
- 1995: Cruzeiro
- 1996: Fluminense
- 1996: Bragantino
- 1996: Botafogo
- 1997: Atlético Paranaense
- 1997: Bahia
- 1999: Cerro Porteño
- 1999: Bragantino
- 2000: Coritiba
- 2000: América Mineiro
- 2001: Sport
- 2001–2002: América Mineiro
- 2003: Avaí
- 2005: Ceará
- 2006: Fortaleza
- 2006–2007: Cabofriense
- 2008: Mesquita
- 2009: Itumbiara
- * Club domestic league appearances and goals

Jair Pereira da Silva (born 29 May 1946), commonly referred to as Jair Pereira, is a football manager and former player. He played as a midfielder.

== Career statistics ==
=== Head coach ===
Nat	Team	From	To	Record				
Nat	Team	From	To	P	W	D	L	Win %
(Brazil)	Ponte Preta	1981	1981	27	15	11	1	55.56
(Brazil)	Campo Grande	1981	1982	38	19	8	11	50.00
(Brazil)	Paysandu	1982	1982	0	0	0	0	—
(Brazil)	Brazil U20	1983	1985	26	23	3	0	88.46
(Brazil)	America-RJ	1985	1985	32	11	9	12	34.38
(Saudi Arabia)	Al-Shabab	1986	1986	5	2	1	2	40.00
(United Arab Emirates)	Al-Jazira	1986	1986	0	0	0	0	—
(Brazil)	Cruzeiro	1987	1987	17	6	9	2	35.29
(Brazil)	Corinthians	1988	1988	27	14	9	4	51.85
(Brazil)	Botafogo	1988	1988	23	7	7	9	30.43
(Brazil)	Atlético Mineiro	1989	1989	64	37	15	12	57.81
(Brazil)	Palmeiras	1990	1990	23	13	5	5	56.52
(Brazil)	CR Flamengo	1990	1990	30	14	10	6	46.67
(Brazil)	Atlético Mineiro	1991	1992	62	26	22	14	41.94
(Brazil)	Cruzeiro	1992	1992	45	28	8	9	62.22
(Spain)	Atlético Madrid	1993	1993	9	3	3	3	33.33
(Brazil)	CR Flamengo	1993	1993	30	17	7	6	56.67
(Brazil)	Vasco da Gama	1994	1994	19	12	6	1	63.16
(Brazil)	Corinthians	1994	1994	45	22	11	12	48.89
(Brazil)	Vasco da Gama	1995	1995	20	7	6	7	35.00
(Brazil)	Cruzeiro	1995	1995	8	3	2	3	37.50
(Brazil)	Fluminense	1996	1996	0	0	0	0	—
(Brazil)	Red Bull Bragantino	1996	1996	0	0	0	0	—
(Brazil)	Botafogo	1996	1996	0	0	0	0	—
(Brazil)	Athletico Paranaense	1997	1997	0	0	0	0	—
(Brazil)	Bahia	1997	1997	0	0	0	0	—
(Paraguay)	Cerro Porteño	1999	1999	12	5	1	6	41.67
(Brazil)	Red Bull Bragantino	1999	1999	21	8	5	8	38.10
(Brazil)	Coritiba	2000	2000	0	0	0	0	—
(Brazil)	América Mineiro	2000	2000	0	0	0	0	—
(Brazil)	Sport Recife	2001	2001	53	26	14	13	49.06
(Brazil)	América Mineiro	2001	2002	75	25	17	33	33.33
(Brazil)	Avaí	2003	2003	33	11	8	14	33.33
(Brazil)	Ceará	2005	2005	24	11	3	10	45.83
(Brazil)	Fortaleza	2006	2006	28	15	7	6	53.57
(Brazil)	Cabofriense	2006	2007	26	9	5	12	34.62
(Brazil)	Mesquita	2008	2008	15	2	6	7	13.33
(Brazil)	Itumbiara	2009	2009	19	7	6	6	36.84
Total				851	398	219	234	46.77

As of November 19, 2012

== Honours ==
=== Player ===
- 1973 - Campeonato Pernambucano (Santa Cruz)
- 1974 - Campeonato Brasileiro Série A (Vasco da Gama)
- 1977 - Taça Guanabara (Vasco da Gama)
- 1977 - Campeonato Carioca (Vasco da Gama)
- 1977 - Taça Guanabara (Vasco da Gama)

=== Manager ===
- 1982 - Campeonato Brasileiro Serie B (Campo Grande)
- 1982 - Campeonato Paraense (Paysandu)
- 1983 - South American Youth Championship (Brazil U-20)
- 1983 - FIFA World Youth Championship (Brazil U-20)
- 1987 - Campeonato Mineiro (Cruzeiro)
- 1988 - Campeonato Paulista (Corinthians)
- 1989 - Campeonato Mineiro (Atlético Mineiro)
- 1990 - Copa do Brasil (Flamengo)
- 1991 -Campeonato Mineiro (Cruzeiro)
- 1992 - Supercopa Libertadores (Cruzeiro)
- 1994 - Campeonato Carioca (Vasco da Gama)
- 2000 - Copa Sul-Minas (América Mineiro)
- 2001 - Campeonato Mineiro (América Mineiro)
- 2006 - Campeonato Cearense (Fortaleza)
