= Ênio Andrade =

Brazilian footballer and manager

Personal information
- Full name: Ênio Vargas de Andrade
- Date of birth: 31 January 1928
- Place of birth: Porto Alegre, Brazil
- Date of death: 22 January 1997 (aged 68)
- Place of death: Porto Alegre, Brazil
- Height: 1.78 m (5 ft 10 in)
- Position: Midfielder

Senior career*
Years	Team	Apps	(Gls)
1949–1950	São José		
1950–1951	Internacional		
1951–1957	Renner		
1958–1960	Palmeiras		
1961	Náutico		
1962	São José		

International career^{‡}
1956	Brazil		

Managerial career
- 1975: Náutico
- 1976: Esportivo
- 1976: Grêmio
- 1977: Santa Cruz
- 1978: Sport
- 1979: Juventude
- 1979–1980: Internacional
- 1981–1982: Grêmio
- 1984: Náutico
- 1985: Coritiba
- 1986: Sport
- 1987–1988: Internacional
- 1988: Palmeiras
- 1989: Corinthians
- 1989: Cruzeiro
- 1990: Cruzeiro
- 1990–1991: Internacional
- 1991–1992: Cruzeiro
- 1992: Bragantino
- 1993: Internacional
- 1994: Cruzeiro
- 1995: Cruzeiro
- * Club domestic league appearances and goals as of 8 October 2019 ‡ National team caps and goals as of 8 October 2019

Ênio Vargas de Andrade (31 January 1928 – 22 January 1997) was a Brazilian football player and coach. He became most notable for his coaching achievements, winning three Brazilian league titles.

== Career ==
Enio Andrade began in 1949 as centre-back with São José, moving to Internacional in Porto Alegre the following year. In 1951 he moved to local rivals Grêmio Esportivo Renner, where he played until 1957.

During his time with Renner coach Selviro Rodrigues assigned him to the midfield. In 1956 he won with Brazil the Panamerican Championship in Mexico.

After ending his career as a player in 1961, Enio Andrade became coach. He was considered a strategist and won three Brazilian championships in 1979 with Internacional (being undefeated, the only one to get this done until today) in 1981 with Grêmio (in the Estádio do Morumbi) and 1985 with Coritiba (in the Maracanã, after dispute penalties).

Enio Andrade also has international achievements in his resume, winning with Cruzeiro the Supercopa Sudamericana, Copa de Oro and the Supercopa Masters.

Enio Andrade died in 1997, at 68 years old, of pulmonary complications.

== Honours ==
=== Player ===
Internacional

- Campeonato Gaúcho: 1950, 1951

Renner

- Campeonato Gaúcho: 1954

Palmeiras

- Taça Brasil: 1960
- Campeonato Paulista: 1959

=== Coach ===
Internacional

- Campeonato Brasileiro: 1979

Grêmio

- Campeonato Brasileiro: 1981

Coritiba

- Campeonato Brasileiro: 1985

Cruzeiro

- Supercopa Libertadores: 1991, 1992
- Copa Ouro: 1995
- Supercopa Masters: 1995
- Campeonato Mineiro: 1992

Náutico

- Campeonato Pernambucano: 1984
