= Roberto Gaúcho =

Brazilian footballer

Personal information
- Full name: Roberto Juceli Weber
- Date of birth: 5 April 1968 (age 58)
- Place of birth: Santa Rosa, Brazil
- Height: 1.80 m (5 ft 11 in)
- Position: Forward

Senior career*
Years	Team	Apps	(Gls)
1986–1988	Joinville		
1988–1989	Grêmio		
1989	Coritiba		
1989	Criciúma		
1990	Vitória	1	(0)
1991	Vasco da Gama		
1992	Guarani		
1992–1997	Cruzeiro	44	(6)
1995	→ Huracán (loan)		
1998	Joinville		
1999	Miami Fusion	5	(1)
Total		50	(7)
- * Club domestic league appearances and goals

Roberto Juceli Weber (born 5 April 1968), commonly known as Roberto Gaúcho, is a retired Brazilian footballer.

== Career statistics ==
=== Club ===
Club	Season	League			Cup		Continental		Other		Total	
Club	Season	Division	Apps	Goals	Apps	Goals	Apps	Goals	Apps	Goals	Apps	Goals
Vitória	1990	Série A	1	0	0	0	0	0	0	0	1	0
Cruzeiro	1992	Série A	0	0	0	0	4 (Note: Appearances in the Supercopa Libertadores)	2	0	0	4	2
Cruzeiro	1993	Série A	7	1	2 (Note: Appearances in the Copa do Brasil)	1	1 (Note: Appearances in the Copa de Oro)	0	0	0	10	2
Cruzeiro	1994	Série A	4	1	0	0	8 (Note: Appearances in the Copa Libertadores)	1	6 (Note: Appearances in the Campeonato Mineiro)	8	18	10
Cruzeiro	1995	Série A	20	1	0	0	2 (Note: One appearance in the Supercopa Libertadores, one appearance in the Copa de Oro)	0	0	0	22	1
Cruzeiro	1996	Série A	8	1	8	3	0	0	5	3	21	7
Cruzeiro	1997	Série A	5	0	0	0	0	0	0	0	5	0
Cruzeiro	Total		44	6	10	4	15	3	11	11	80	24
Miami Fusion	1999	MLS	5	1	0	0	0	0	0	0	5	1
Career total			50	7	10	4	15	3	11	11	86	25
