= Adrianópolis =

- Municipality and town
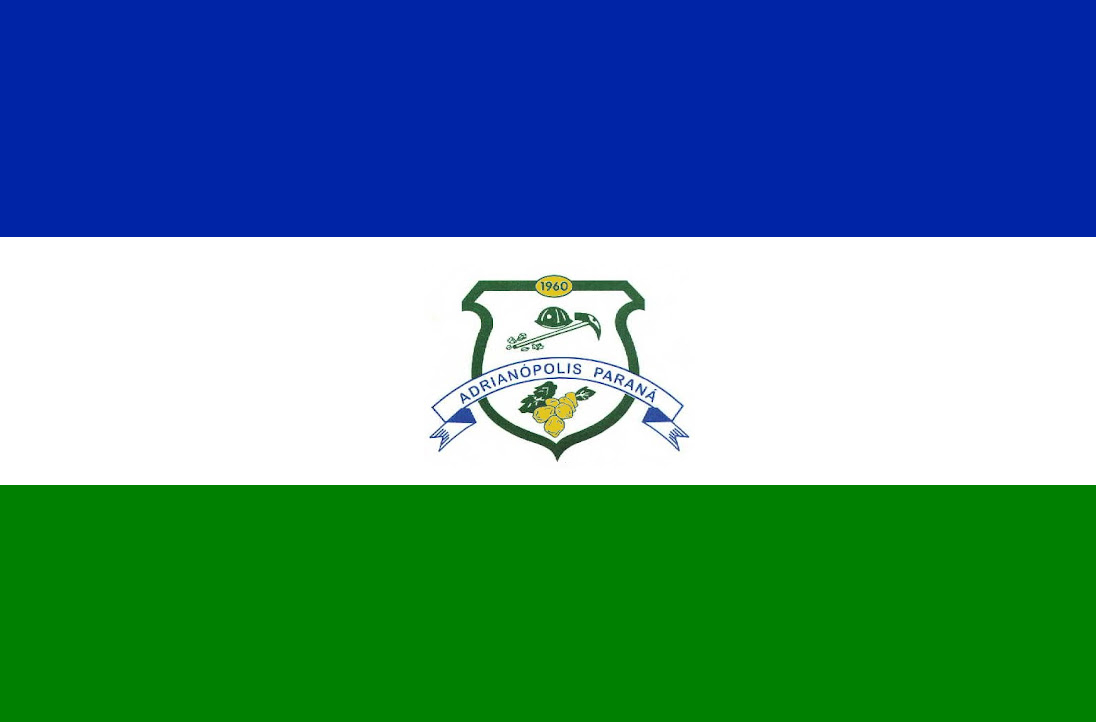
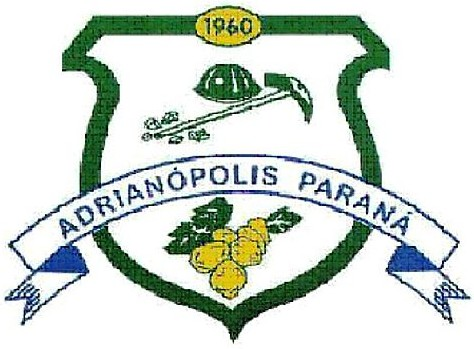
- Flag Coat of arms

- Location in Brazil
- Coordinates: 24°39′25″S 48°59′27″W
- Country: Brazil
- Region: Southern
- State: Paraná
- Mesoregion: Metropolitana de Curitiba

Population (2020)
  - Total: 5,857
- Time zone: UTC−3 (BRT)

Adrianópolis is a municipality in the state of Paraná in the Southern Region of Brazil.

== See also ==
- List of municipalities in Paraná
