= Copa Master de Supercopa =

- The trophy given to champion
- Organizer(s): CONMEBOL
- Founded: 1992
- Abolished: 1995; 31 years ago
- Region: South America
- Teams: 4 (1992); 2 (1995)
- Related competitions: Supercopa Libertadores
- Most championships: (Argentina) Boca Juniors (Brazil) Cruzeiro (1 title each)

The Copa Master de Supercopa was a football competition contested by clubs that had previously won the Supercopa Libertadores. It was organized by CONMEBOL and only played in 1992 and 1995. A third edition was scheduled to be played in 1998, but it was initially delayed and eventually cancelled due to a lack of sponsors.

The format of the tournament was different in both editions. The first edition in 1992 featured all 4 champions at the time. It was played in Buenos Aires and won by Boca Juniors. The second edition was to be played in 1994 but moved to 1995. Only two eligible teams accepted the invitation to play. The cup was played over two legs and won by Cruzeiro.

The winners of the competitions were also given the chance to participate in a following-season grand super cup called the Copa de Oro. This competition was played three times. The first two competitions featured the respective Copa Master de Supercopa champion; however, as no Copa Master de Supercopa was contested in 1996, the vacant berth for the 1996 Copa de Oro went to the 1996 Copa Master de CONMEBOL champion.

== Records and statistics ==
=== List of finals ===
Keys

- aet: after extra time
- p: defined on penalty shoot-out
- Match decided by a penalty shootout after extra time
- Match playoff after the series ended tied on aggregate
- Defined on penalty shoot-out in the second leg

Ed.	Year	Winners	1st. leg	2nd. leg	Playoff/ Agg.	Runner-up	Venue (1st leg)	City (1st leg)	Venue (2nd leg)	City (2nd leg)
1	1992	(Argentina) Boca Juniors	2–1			(Brazil) Cruzeiro	José Amalfitani	Buenos Aires	–	
2	1995	(Brazil) Cruzeiro	0–0	1–0	–	(Paraguay) Olimpia	Defensores del Chaco	Asunción	Mineirão	Belo Horizonte
–	1998	Tournament cancelled								

=== Performances by club ===
Team	Winner	Runner-up	Years won	Years runner-up
(Brazil) Cruzeiro	1	1	1995	1992
(Argentina) Boca Juniors	1	0	1992	—
(Paraguay) Olimpia	0	1	—	1995

=== Performances by nation ===
Country	Won	Runners-up	Winning Clubs	Runners-Up
Brazil	1	1	Cruzeiro (1)	Cruzeiro (1)
Argentina	1	0	Boca Juniors (1)	—

== 1992 Supercopa Masters ==
1992 Supercopa Masters
Tournament details
- Host country: Argentina
- City: Buenos Aires
- Dates: 27 May – 31 May
- Teams: 4 (from 1 confederation)
- Venue: 1 (in 1 host city)

Final positions
- Champions: (Argentina) Boca Juniors (1st title)
- Runners-up: (Brazil) Cruzeiro
- Third place: (Paraguay) Olimpia
- Fourth place: (Argentina) Racing

Tournament statistics
- Matches played: 4
- Goals scored: 9 (2.25 per match)

The 1992 Supercopa Masters featured the four previous winners of the time. It was played in Buenos Aires at Estadio José Amalfitani.

=== Participants ===
Team	Supercopa champion
(Argentina) Racing	1988
(Argentina) Boca Juniors	1989
(Paraguay) Olimpia	1990
(Brazil) Cruzeiro	1991

=== Bracket ===
Semi-finals
27 May – Buenos Aires
(Argentina) Boca Juniors	1
(Paraguay) Olimpia	0
29 May - Buenos Aires
(Argentina) Racing	1 (1)
(Brazil) Cruzeiro (pen)	1 (3)

Final
31 May – Buenos Aires
(Argentina) Boca Juniors	2
(Brazil) Cruzeiro	1
Third place
31 May – Buenos Aires
(Paraguay) Olimpia	2
(Argentina) Racing	1

== 1995 Supercopa Masters ==
1995 Supercopa Masters
Tournament details
- Dates: 3 May – 16 May
- Teams: 2 (from 1 confederation)

Final positions
- Champions: (Brazil) Cruzeiro (1st title)
- Runners-up: (Paraguay) Olimpia

Tournament statistics
- Matches played: 2
- Goals scored: 1 (0.5 per match)

The 1995 Supercopa Masters was a two-legged match between two previous Supercopa Sudamericana champions. It was to be played in 1994 but was postponed until 1995.

=== Participants ===
Team	Champion
(Paraguay) Olimpia	1990
(Brazil) Cruzeiro	1991, 1992

=== First leg ===
3 March 1995

Olimpia (Paraguay)	0–0	(Brazil) Cruzeiro
	Report

Estadio Defensores del Chaco, Asunción
Referee: Alberto Tejada (Peru)

=== Second leg ===
16 March 1995

Cruzeiro (Brazil)	1–0	(Paraguay) Olimpia
Marcelo 76'	Report

Mineirão, Belo Horizonte
Attendance: 20,000
Referee: Javier Castrilli (Argentina)

Cruzeiro	Olimpia

GK	(Cameroon) William Andem
RB	(Brazil) Rodrigo Silva
CB	(Brazil) Júnior
CB	(Brazil) Rogério
LB	(Brazil) Nonato
DM	(Brazil) Ademir
DM	(Brazil) Pingo
MF	(Brazil) Ricardinho	(substituted off) a'
MF	(Brazil) Luís Fernando Flores
FW	(Brazil) Cleisson	(substituted off) b'
FW	(Brazil) Marcelo Ramos
Substitutes:
FW	(Brazil) Tiganá	(substituted on) a'
FW	(Brazil) Dinei	(substituted on) b'
Manager:
(Brazil) Carlos Alberto Silva

GK	(Uruguay) Arbiza
RB	(Paraguay) Cáceres
CB	(Paraguay) Saravia
CB	(Paraguay) Caballero
LB	(Paraguay) Suárez	(substituted off) a'
DM	(Paraguay) Fernández
DM	(Paraguay) Vidal Sanabria
MF	(Paraguay) Jara
MF	(Paraguay) Esteche
FW	(Paraguay) Báez
FW	(Paraguay) Samaniego
Substitutes:
MF	(Paraguay) Campos	(substituted on) a'
Manager:
(Uruguay) Miguel Ángel Piazza

Cruzeiro won 1–0 on aggregate.

== 1998 Supercopa Masters ==
The 1998 Supercopa Masters was to feature all previous Supercopa Sudamericana winners. It was to be played between 28 May and 7 June in Avellaneda, Argentina but was postponed due to a lack of sponsors. It was to be played after the World Cup but was later dropped.

=== Participants ===
Team	Champion
(Argentina) Racing	1988
(Argentina) Boca Juniors	1989
(Paraguay) Olimpia	1990
(Brazil) Cruzeiro	1991, 1992
(Brazil) São Paulo	1993
(Argentina) Independiente	1994, 1995
(Argentina) Vélez Sársfield	1996
(Argentina) River Plate	1997

== See also ==
- Copa de Oro
- Copa Master de CONMEBOL
- Copa Libertadores
- Supercopa Libertadores
