= Marco Antônio Boiadeiro =

Brazilian footballer (born 1965)

Personal information
- Full name: Marco Antônio Ribeiro
- Date of birth: 13 June 1965 (age 61)
- Place of birth: Américo de Campos, Brazil
- Position: Midfielder

Senior career*
Years	Team	Apps	(Gls)
1985	Botafogo-SP		
1986–1988	Guarani	40	(2)
1989–1991	Vasco da Gama	24	(1)
1991–1993	Cruzeiro	46	(2)
1994	Flamengo	15	(0)
1994–1995	Corinthians	17	(2)
1996	Rio Branco		
1996	Anápolis		
1997–1998	América-MG		
1998–1999	Atlético Mineiro	16	(0)
2000	Sãocarlense		

International career
1993	Brazil	5	(0)
- * Club domestic league appearances and goals

Marco Antônio Ribeiro, commonly known as Marco Antônio Boiadeiro, or simply as Boiadeiro (born 13 June 1965), is a Brazilian former footballer who played as a midfielder for several Série A clubs. He also played for the Brazil national team.

== Club career ==
Born in Américo de Campos, Boiadeiro started his professional career in 1985, defending Botafogo de Ribeirão Preto. He moved to Guarani in 1986, leaving the club two years later, then defending Vasco da Gama from 1989 to 1991. Boiadeiro defended Cruzeiro from 1991 to 1993, then spent a season with Flamengo in 1994, playing 15 games for the club. He played for Corinthians during the 1994 and the 1995 seasons, then played briefly in 1996 for Rio Branco and Anápolis. Boiadeiro defended two clubs from Belo Horizonte, América Mineiro in 1997 and in 1998, and Atlético Mineiro in 1998 and in 1999. Marco Antônio Boiadeiro retired in 2000, while defending Sãocarlense of São Paulo state

== International career ==
Boiadeiro played five games for the Brazil national team in 1993, including four Copa América games. His first game was played on June 6, against the United States, while the last game was played against Argentina on June 27, where he missed his shot at the penalty shootout in that tournament's quarter finals, costing Brazil the spot at the semifinals.
