= Charles Fabian =

Brazilian footballer and manager (born 1968)

Personal information
- Full name: Charles Fabian Figueiredo Santos
- Date of birth: 12 April 1968 (age 58)
- Place of birth: Itapetinga (BA), Brazil
- Position: Forward

Senior career*
| Years | Team | Apps | (Gls) |
| 1988–1989 | Bahia | | |
| 1990 | Málaga | 2 | (0) |
| 1990 | Bahia | | |
| 1991–1992 | Cruzeiro | | |
| 1992–1993 | Boca Juniors | | |
| 1993 | Grêmio | | |
| 1994–1996 | Bahia | | |
| 1996 | Flamengo | | |
| 1997–1998 | Matonense | | |
| 1998 | Desportiva Capixaba | | |
| 2000 | Camaçari | | |

International career
| 1989–1991 | Brazil | 9 | (3) |

Managerial career
- 2006: Bahia
- 2007: Votoraty
- 2008: Icasa
- 2008: Camaçari
- 2014: Bahia
- 2015: Bahia
- 2017: Anápolis
- * Club domestic league appearances and goals

Charles Fabian Figueiredo Santos (born 12 April 1968) is a Brazilian football manager and former player, who played as a striker.

== Playing career ==
Charles Fabian was chosen for the 1989 Copa América while playing for Esporte Clube Bahia in his home state of Bahia. He was cut from the final squad days before Brazil's opening game against Venezuela, in his club's city of Salvador. The game was played in a half-full stadium, the flag of Brazil was burned and the national anthem jeered at, while flares were thrown at the Brazilian bench. Charles Fabian appreciated the support given to him, but rejected the burning of the flag.

Charles Fabian was the top scorer of the 1990 Campeonato Brasileiro Série A, with 11 goals. He was the second player from a Northeast Brazilian club to do so after Ramón for Santa Cruz Esporte Clube in 1973, and the feat has only been repeated since by Diego Souza for Sport Club do Recife in 2016.

== Managerial career ==
Charles Fabian had two spells as interim manager of Bahia in 2006, and another in 2014, as the club changed manager a Brazilian record 63 times between 2003 and 2018. On 7 October 2015, he was hired on a permanent basis in place of Sérgio Soares for the conclusion of the 2015 Campeonato Brasileiro Série B. Having missed out on promotion, he was replaced by Doriva.

On 3 February 2017, Charles Fabian left Anápolis Futebol Clube by mutual consent after presiding over a draw and a loss in the first two games of the 2017 Campeonato Goiano.

== Honours ==
=== Player ===
==== Club ====
Bahia

- Campeonato Baiano: 1987, 1988, 1991
- Campeonato Brasileiro Série A: 1988

Boca Juniors

- Primera División: 1992–93

==== Individual ====
- Campeonato Brasileiro Série A top goalscorer: 1990
- Campeonato Carioca top goalscorer: 1994
