= Ademir (footballer, born 1960) =

Brazilian footballer

Personal information
- Full name: Ademir Roque Kaefer
- Date of birth: 6 January 1960 (age 66)
- Place of birth: Toledo, Paraná, Brazil
- Position: Midfielder

Senior career*
Years	Team	Apps	(Gls)
1977–1980	Toledo		
1981–1986	Internacional		
1986	Santo André		
1986–1992	Cruzeiro		
1992–1993	Racing		
1993–1995	Cruzeiro		

International career
1984–1988	Brazil Olympics	11	(0)
1988	Brazil	5	(0)
Medal record
Men's football
Representing Brazil
Olympic Games
Silver medal – second place	1984 Los Angeles	Team Competition
Silver medal – second place	1988 Seoul	Team competition
Pan American Games
Gold medal – first place	1987 Indianapolis	Team competition
- * Club domestic league appearances and goals

Ademir Roque Kaefer (born 6 January 1960 in Toledo, Paraná), known as just Ademir, is a Brazilian former footballer who played as a midfielder.

In his career (1978–1995) he played for SC Internacional, Toledo, Racing Club (Argentina), Matsubara, Santo André and Cruzeiro. He won four Campeonato Gaúcho (1981, 1982, 1983, 1984), three Campeonato Mineiro (1987, 1990, 1994), one Brazilian Cup (1993) and one Supercopa Sudamericana (1991).

With the Brazilian Olympic Team he won silver medal at the 1984 Summer Olympics, and with the senior Brazil team played seven matches in 1988. In same he year was in the squad for the 1988 Summer Olympics, and won another silver medal. He never played in the FIFA World Cup, and retired after a 16-year career.
