= 1993 Copa do Brasil =

Copa do Brasil 1993
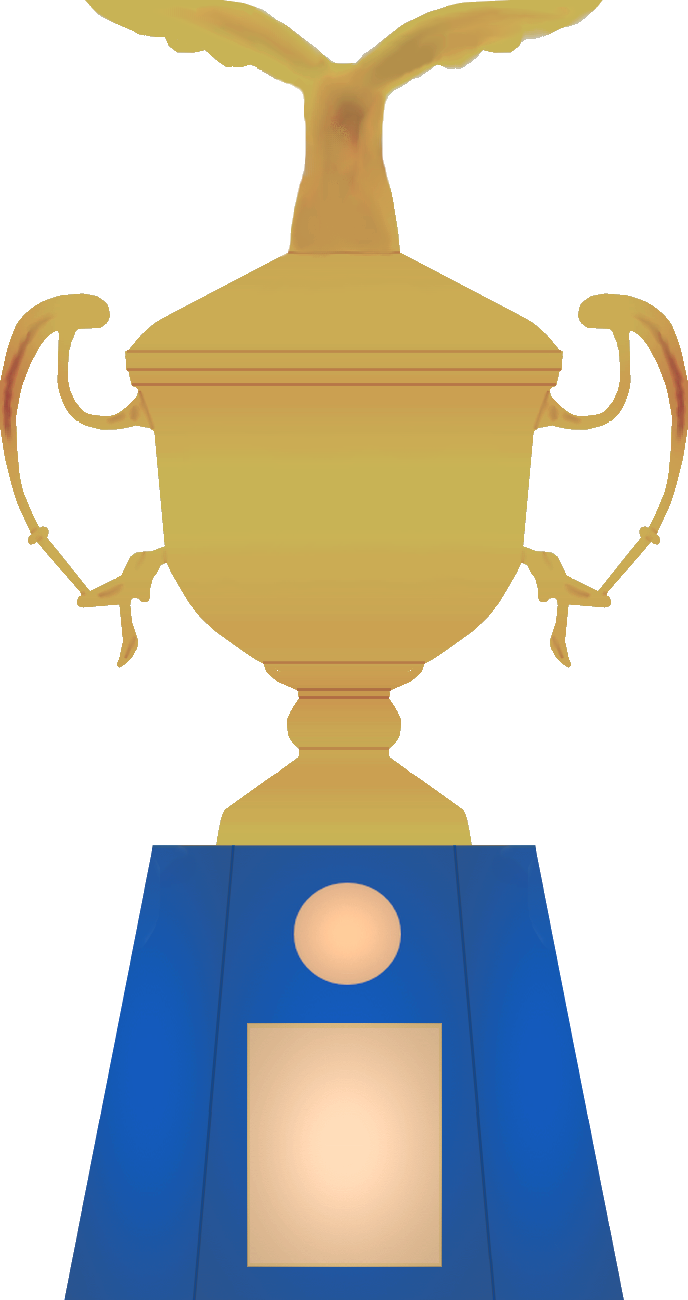
- Trophy of the Copa do Brazil, 1993

Tournament details
- Country: Brazil
- Dates: March 2 – June 3
- Teams: 32

Final positions
- Champions: Cruzeiro (MG)
- Runners-up: Grêmio (RS)

Tournament statistics
- Matches played: 62
- Goals scored: 180 (2.9 per match)
- Top goal scorer: Gilson (8)

The Copa do Brasil 1993 was the 5th staging of the Copa do Brasil.

The competition started on March 2, 1993, and concluded on June 3, 1993, with the second leg of the final, held at the Mineirão Stadium in Belo Horizonte, in which Cruzeiro lifted the trophy for the first time with a 2-1 victory over Grêmio.

Gílson, of Grêmio, with 8 goals, was the competition's topscorer.

== Format ==
The competition was disputed by 32 clubs in a knock-out format where all rounds were played over two legs and the away goals rule was used.

== Competition stages ==
1st Round
1	Desportiva (ES)	1 0
32	Cruzeiro (MG)	1 5
17	CRB (AL)	0 0
16	Náutico (PE)	1 5
9	Sergipe (SE)	1 3
24	São Paulo (SP)	1 4
25	Sul-América (AM)	0 0
8	Rio Branco (AC)	1 0
5	Sampaio Corrêa (AM)	0 1
28	Vasco (RJ)	3 2
21	Trem (AP)	0 0
12	Remo (PA)	5 2
13	Ceará (CE)	1 3
20	Goiatuba (GO)	0 2
29	Taguatinga (DF)	1 0
4	Sport (PE)	4 3
3	Sorriso (MT)	1 2
30	Grêmio (RS)	1 5
19	União Bandeirante (PR)	2 1
14	Brusque (SC)	2 0
11	4 de Julho (PI)	0 0
22	Palmeiras (SP)	2 3
27	Vitória (BA)	1 2
6	América (MG)	0 1
7	América (RN)	2 0
26	Flamengo (RJ)	2 4
23	Auto Esporte (PB)	2 0
10	Paysandu (PA)	1 2
15	Operário (MS)	1 0
18	Londrina (PR)	3 2
31	Ji-Paraná (RO)	0 1
2	Internacional (RS)	6 9

2nd Round
Cruzeiro (MG)	0 2
Náutico (PE)	1 0
São Paulo (SP)	0 3
Rio Branco (AC)	1 1
Vasco (RJ)	0 4
Remo (PA)	0 0
Ceará (CE)	1 1
Sport (PE)	0 0
Grêmio (RS)	4 2
União Bandeirante (PR)	0 1
Palmeiras (SP)	1 1
Vitória (BA)	2 0
Flamengo (RJ)	2 3
Paysandu (PA)	3 0
Londrina (PR)	1 1
Internacional (RS)	1 0

Quarterfinals
Cruzeiro (MG)	2 2
São Paulo (SP)	1 2
Vasco (RJ)	2 2
Ceará (CE)	1 0
Grêmio (RS)	1 1 (pen: 7)
Palmeiras (SP)	1 1 (pen: 6)
Flamengo (RJ)	1 1
Londrina (PR)	0 1

Semifinals
Cruzeiro (MG)	3 1
Vasco (RJ)	1 1
Grêmio (RS)	3 1
Flamengo (RJ)	4 0

Finals
Cruzeiro (MG)	0 2
Grêmio (RS)	0 1

Copa do Brasil
1993 Winners
Cruzeiro
First Title
