= 1991 Supercopa Libertadores =

1991 Supercopa Sudamericana
1991 Supercopa Libertadores João Havelange

Tournament details
- Teams: 14 (from 5 confederations)

Final positions
- Champions: (Brazil) Cruzeiro (1st title)
- Runners-up: (Argentina) River Plate

Tournament statistics
- Matches played: 26
- Goals scored: 53 (2.04 per match)
- Top scorer(s): (Argentina) Juan José Borrelli (Brazil) Charles (Brazil) Gaúcho (Argentina) Sergio Martínez (3 goals)

The 1991 Supercopa Libertadores was the fourth season of the Supercopa Libertadores, a club football tournament for past Copa Libertadores winners. The tournament was won by Cruzeiro, who beat River Plate 3–2 on aggregate in the final.

As the new reigning Copa Libertadores champions, Chilean side Colo-Colo were admitted into the competition.

Former Copa Libertadores winners Atlético Nacional did not take part.

== Qualified teams ==
Up until the middle of 1991, 15 teams had won the Copa Libertadores at least once since its inaugural season in 1960; however, only 14 teams participated as Atlético Nacional declined to play in the tournament.

Team	First won
(Uruguay) Peñarol	1960
(Brazil) Santos	1962
(Argentina) Independiente	1964
(Argentina) Racing	1967
(Argentina) Estudiantes	1968
(Uruguay) Nacional	1971
(Brazil) Cruzeiro	1976
(Argentina) Boca Juniors	1977
(Paraguay) Olimpia	1979
(Brazil) Flamengo	1981
(Brazil) Grêmio	1983
(Argentina) Argentinos Juniors	1985
(Argentina) River Plate	1986
(Colombia) Atlético Nacional	1989
(Chile) Colo-Colo	1991

== Bracket ==
First round
(Brazil) Grêmio	2	1 (3)
(Argentina) River Plate	2	1 (4)
(Argentina) Estudiantes	1	0
(Brazil) Flamengo	1	2
(Argentina) Racing	2	0
(Uruguay) Peñarol	3	0
(Brazil) Santos	2	0
(Argentina) Argentinos Juniors	1	0
(Chile) Colo-Colo	0	0 (3)
(Brazil) Cruzeiro	0	0 (4)
(Uruguay) Nacional	1	0
(Argentina) Boca Juniors	1	2

Quarter-finals
(Argentina) River Plate	1	1 (4)
(Brazil) Flamengo	0	2 (3)
(Uruguay) Peñarol	3	0
(Brazil) Santos	2	0
(Brazil) Cruzeiro	4	0
(Uruguay) Nacional	0	3
(Paraguay) Olimpia	1	2
(Argentina) Independiente	1	0

Semi-finals
(Argentina) River Plate	2	3
(Uruguay) Peñarol	0	1
(Brazil) Cruzeiro	1	0 (5)
(Paraguay) Olimpia	1	0 (4)

Finals
(Argentina) River Plate	2	0
(Brazil) Cruzeiro	0	3

== First round ==
Teams from the same nation could not be drawn against one another. Olimpia, as the title holders, entered the competition at the quarterfinal stage. Independiente also advanced to that same stage after the initial draw.

Team 1	Agg.	Team 2	1st leg	2nd leg
River Plate (Argentina)	3–3 (4-3 p)	(Brazil) Grêmio	2–2	1–1
Peñarol (Uruguay)	3–2	(Argentina) Racing	3–2	0–0
Argentinos Juniors (Argentina)	1–2	(Brazil) Santos	1–2	0–0
Flamengo (Brazil)	3–1	(Argentina) Estudiantes	1–1	2–0
Cruzeiro (Brazil)	0–0 (4-3 p)	(Chile) Colo-Colo	0–0	0–0
Boca Juniors (Argentina)	1–3	(Uruguay) Nacional	1–1	0–2

== Quarterfinals ==
Team 1	Agg.	Team 2	1st leg	2nd leg
Peñarol (Uruguay)	3–2	(Brazil) Santos	3–2	0–0
River Plate (Argentina)	2–2 (4-3 p)	(Brazil) Flamengo	1–0	1–2
Cruzeiro (Brazil)	4–3	(Uruguay) Nacional	4–0	0–3
Independiente (Argentina)	1–3	(Paraguay) Olimpia	1–1	0–2

== Semi-finals ==
Team 1	Agg.	Team 2	1st leg	2nd leg
River Plate (Argentina)	5–1	(Uruguay) Peñarol	2–0	3–1
Cruzeiro (Brazil)	1–1 (5-4 p)	(Paraguay) Olimpia	1–1	0–0

== Final ==
Team 1	Agg.	Team 2	1st leg	2nd leg
River Plate (Argentina)	2–3	(Brazil) Cruzeiro	2–0	0–3

1991 Supercopa
Sudamericana Winners

Cruzeiro
First Title

== See also ==
- 1991 Copa Libertadores
