= 1992 Supercopa Libertadores =

1992 Supercopa Libertadores João Havelange

Tournament details
- Dates: September 29 – November 25
- Teams: 16 (from 6 confederations)

Final positions
- Champions: (Brazil) Cruzeiro (2nd title)
- Runners-up: (Argentina) Racing

Tournament statistics
- Matches played: 28
- Goals scored: 68 (2.43 per match)
- Top scorer(s): (Brazil) Renato Gaúcho (6 goals)

The 1992 Supercopa Libertadores was the fifth season of the Supercopa Libertadores, a club football tournament for past Copa Libertadores winners. The tournament was won by Cruzeiro, who beat Racing 4–1 on aggregate in the final. This was the second time Cruzeiro had won the Supercopa Libertadores.

As the new reigning Copa Libertadores champions, Brazilian side São Paulo were admitted into the competition.

Colombian side Atlético Nacional took part for the first time in 3 seasons.

== First round ==
The matches were played from 29 September to 15 October.

Team 1	Agg.	Team 2	1st leg	2nd leg
Boca Juniors (Argentina)	2–2 (3–4 p)	(Argentina) Estudiantes	2–1	0–1
Santos (Brazil)	2–5	(Brazil) São Paulo	1–1	1–4
Colo-Colo (Chile)	1–1 (2–3 p)	(Paraguay) Olimpia	1–0	0–1
Argentinos Juniors (Argentina)	1–5	(Argentina) River Plate	1–2	0–3
Peñarol (Uruguay)	2–3	(Uruguay) Nacional	2–2	0–1
Racing (Argentina)	2–1	(Argentina) Independiente	2–1	0–0
Grêmio (Brazil)	1–2	(Brazil) Flamengo	1–1	0–1
Atlético Nacional (Colombia)	1–9	(Brazil) Cruzeiro	1–1	0–8

== Quarter finals ==
The matches were played from 20 October to 30 October. Nacional withdrew before the first leg of their quarter final against Racing due to a players' strike.

Team 1	Agg.	Team 2	1st leg	2nd leg
São Paulo (Brazil)	1–3	(Paraguay) Olimpia	1–2	0–1
Cruzeiro (Brazil)	2–2 (5–4 p)	(Argentina) River Plate	2–0	0–2
Flamengo (Brazil)	2–1	(Argentina) Estudiantes	1–0	1–1
Racing (Argentina)	w/o	(Uruguay) Nacional	–	–

== Semi-finals ==
The matches were played from 4 November to 11 November.

Team 1	Agg.	Team 2	1st leg	2nd leg
Flamengo (Brazil)	3–4	(Argentina) Racing	3–3	0–1
Olimpia (Paraguay)	2–3	(Brazil) Cruzeiro	0–1	2–2

== Final ==
Team 1	Agg.	Team 2	1st leg	2nd leg
Cruzeiro (Brazil)	4–1	(Argentina) Racing	4–0	0–1

1992 Supercopa
Libertadores Winners

Cruzeiro
Second Title

== See also ==
- 1992 Copa Libertadores
