= Supercopa Libertadores =

- The trophy given to champions
- Organizer(s): CONMEBOL
- Founded: 1988
- Abolished: 1997; 29 years ago
- Region: South America
- Teams: 16 (1997)
- Related competitions: Copa Libertadores
- Last champion: (Argentina) River Plate (1st title)
- Most championships: (Brazil) Cruzeiro; (Argentina) Independiente; (2 titles each)

The Supercopa Libertadores (English: Libertadores Supercup), also known as the Supercopa Sudamericana, Supercopa Libertadores João Havelange, Supercopa João Havelange or simply Supercopa, was a football club competition contested annually between 1988 and 1997 by the past winners of the Copa Libertadores. The tournament is one of the many South American club competitions that have been organized by CONMEBOL.

== History ==
As through the successive editions of this cup were added new champions from the Copa Libertadores, in 1997 the CONMEBOL decided that the last teams of each group would descend to reduce the number of teams to disputed it. That year descended Velez Sarsfield, Racing Club and Boca Juniors (all teams from Argentina) and Gremio (Brazil).

The competition was discontinued to make way for the Copa Mercosur and Copa Merconorte in 1998, which also grew in importance after the final season of the Copa CONMEBOL in 1999. These tournaments were also discontinued in favor of the Copa Sudamericana which allowed the revival of the Recopa Sudamericana.

Prior to its abolition, the Supercopa Libertadores was regarded as the second most prestigious South American club competition out of the three major tournaments, behind the Copa Libertadores and ahead of the Copa CONMEBOL. The winner of the tournament played the winner of the Copa Libertadores in the Recopa Sudamericana. Since the abolition of the Supercopa, the Recopa Sudamericana place previously reserved for the Supercopa winner has been taken by the winner of the Copa Sudamericana.

The last champion of the competition was River Plate, while Cruzeiro and Independiente are the most successful clubs in the cup history, having won the tournament two times each. The cup has been won by eight different clubs and won consecutively by Cruzeiro and Independiente.

1n 1998 a new tournament the Supercopa Masters 1998 was planned to be played between the 8 former winners of the Supercopaa Libertadores. It was scheduled for May 28-June 7, 1998, in Avellaneda (Argentina) as a knock-out competition. It was then postponed until after the 1998 World Cup due to the fact that no sponsors could be found. Eventually the competiition was cancelled.

== Format and rules ==
The format for the Supercopa Libertadores underwent changes nearly every season. The most common reason behind it was the addition of a new Copa Libertadores winner. The only way to participate in the Supercopa was being a past winner of the Copa Libertadores. Vasco da Gama was later admitted into the competition as winners of the Copa Libertadores' predecessor, the Campeonato Sudamericano de Campeones. The tournament was predominantly a single-elimination tournament with several stages, exception made the last edition in 1997, which consisted of a group stage from where four teams advanced to knock-out semifinals.

Every round of the competition was contested over a two-legged tie. The teams accumulate points as per the results of the match (3 for a win, 1 for a draw, 0 for a loss). The team with more points after both legs advanced to the next round. Unlike European club competitions, South America did not use extra time to decide a tie that was level on aggregate. Ties in points would be broken first by goal difference, and ultimately by a penalty shootout after the culmination of the second leg.

== Records and statistics ==
=== Finals ===
Keys

- aet: after extra time
- p: defined on penalty shoot-out
- Match decided by a penalty shootout after extra time
- Match playoff after the series ended tied on aggregate
- Defined on penalty shoot-out in the second leg

Ed.	Year	Winners	1st. leg	2nd. leg	Playoff/ Agg.	Runners-up	Venue (1st leg)	City (1st leg)	Venue (2nd leg)	City (2nd leg)
1	1988	(Argentina) Racing	2–1	1–1	–	(Brazil) Cruzeiro	El Cilindro	Avellaneda	Mineirão	Belo Horizonte
2	1989	(Argentina) Boca Juniors	0–0	0–0	5–3 (p)	(Argentina) Independiente	La Bombonera	Buenos Aires	La Doble Visera	Avellaneda
3	1990	(Paraguay) Olimpia	3–0	3–3	–	(Uruguay) Nacional	Centenario	Montevideo	Defensores del Chaco	Asunción
4	1991	(Brazil) Cruzeiro	0–2	3–0	–	(Argentina) River Plate	Monumental	Buenos Aires	Mineirão	Belo Horizonte
5	1992	(Brazil) Cruzeiro	4–0	0–1	–	(Argentina) Racing	Mineirão	Belo Horizonte	El Cilindro	Avellaneda
6	1993	(Brazil) São Paulo	2–2	2–2	5–3 (p)	(Brazil) Flamengo	Maracanã	Rio de Janeiro	Morumbi	São Paulo
7	1994	(Argentina) Independiente	1–1	2–1	–	(Argentina) Boca Juniors	La Bombonera	Buenos Aires	La Doble Visera	Avellaneda
8	1995	(Argentina) Independiente	2–0	0–1	–	(Brazil) Flamengo	La Doble Visera	Avellaneda	Maracanã	Rio de Janeiro
9	1996	(Argentina) Vélez Sarsfield	1–0	2–0	–	(Brazil) Cruzeiro	Mineirão	Belo Horizonte	José Amalfitani	Buenos Aires
10	1997	(Argentina) River Plate	0–0	2–1	–	(Brazil) São Paulo	Morumbi	São Paulo	Monumental	Buenos Aires

=== Performances by club ===
Club	Titles	Runners-up	Seasons won	Seasons runner-up
(Brazil) Cruzeiro	2	2	1991, 1992	1988, 1996
(Argentina) Independiente	2	1	1994, 1995	1989
(Argentina) Racing	1	1	1988	1992
(Argentina) Boca Juniors	1	1	1989	1994
(Brazil) São Paulo	1	1	1993	1997
(Argentina) River Plate	1	1	1997	1991
(Paraguay) Olimpia	1	0	1990	—
(Argentina) Vélez Sársfield	1	0	1996	—
(Brazil) Flamengo	0	2	—	1993, 1995
(Uruguay) Nacional	0	1	—	1990

=== Participants (1988–1997) ===
- (Argentina) Argentinos Juniors
- (Argentina) Boca Juniors
- (Argentina) Estudiantes
- (Argentina) Independiente
- (Argentina) Racing
- (Argentina) River Plate
- (Argentina) Vélez Sarsfield
- (Brazil) Cruzeiro
- (Brazil) Flamengo
- (Brazil) Grêmio
- (Brazil) Santos
- (Brazil) São Paulo
- (Brazil) Vasco da Gama
- (Chile) Colo-Colo
- (Colombia) Atlético Nacional
- (Paraguay) Olimpia
- (Uruguay) Nacional
- (Uruguay) Peñarol

== Top scorers ==
Year	Player (team)	Goals
1988	(Uruguay) Antonio Alzamendi (River Plate) (Uruguay) Sergio Olivera (Nacional)	4
1989	(Argentina) Mauro Airez (Argentinos Juniors) (Argentina) Rubén Darío Insúa (Independiente) (Colombia) John Jairo Tréllez (Atlético Nacional)	3
1990	(Paraguay) Raúl Amarilla (Olimpia)	7
1991	(Argentina) Juan José Borrelli (River Plate) (Brazil) Charles (Cruzeiro) (Brazil) Gaúcho (Flamengo) (Argentina) Sergio Martínez (Peñarol)	3
1992	(Brazil) Renato Gaúcho (Cruzeiro)	6
1993	(Brazil) Ronaldo (Cruzeiro)	8
1994	(Argentina) Sebastián Rambert (Independiente)	5
1995	(Uruguay) Enzo Francescoli (River Plate)	7
1996	(Argentina) Patricio Camps (Vélez Sarsfield)	4
1997	(Chile) Ivo Basay (Colo-Colo)	8

== See also ==
- Copa Mercosur
- Copa Merconorte
