= 1989 Supercopa Libertadores finals =

- Event: 1989 Supercopa Libertadores
Boca Juniors	Independiente
(Argentina)	(Argentina)
0	0
- Boca Juniors won 5–3 on penalties

First Leg
Boca Juniors	Independiente
0	0
- Date: November 22, 1989
- Venue: La Bombonera, Buenos Aires
- Referee: Francisco Lamolina (Argentina)
- Attendance: 65,000

Second Leg
Independiente	Boca Juniors
0	0
- Date: November 29, 1989
- Venue: La Doble Visera, Avellaneda
- Referee: Juan Bava (Argentina)
- Attendance: 70,000

The 1989 Supercopa Libertadores Finals was a two-legged football series between Independiente and Boca Juniors to decide the 1989 Supercopa Libertadores champion. The matches were played on November 22 and November 29 of that same year.

In the first leg, held in La Bombonera, both teams tied 0–0. The second leg was held in La Doble Visera, where both clubs also tied 0–0. As both teams were tied on points, a penalty shoot-out had to be carried out to decide a winner. Boca Juniors won 5–3 on penalties to claim their first Supercopa Libertadores title.

== Qualified teams ==
Team	Previous finals app.
(Argentina) Boca Juniors	None
(Argentina) Independiente	None

== Venues ==
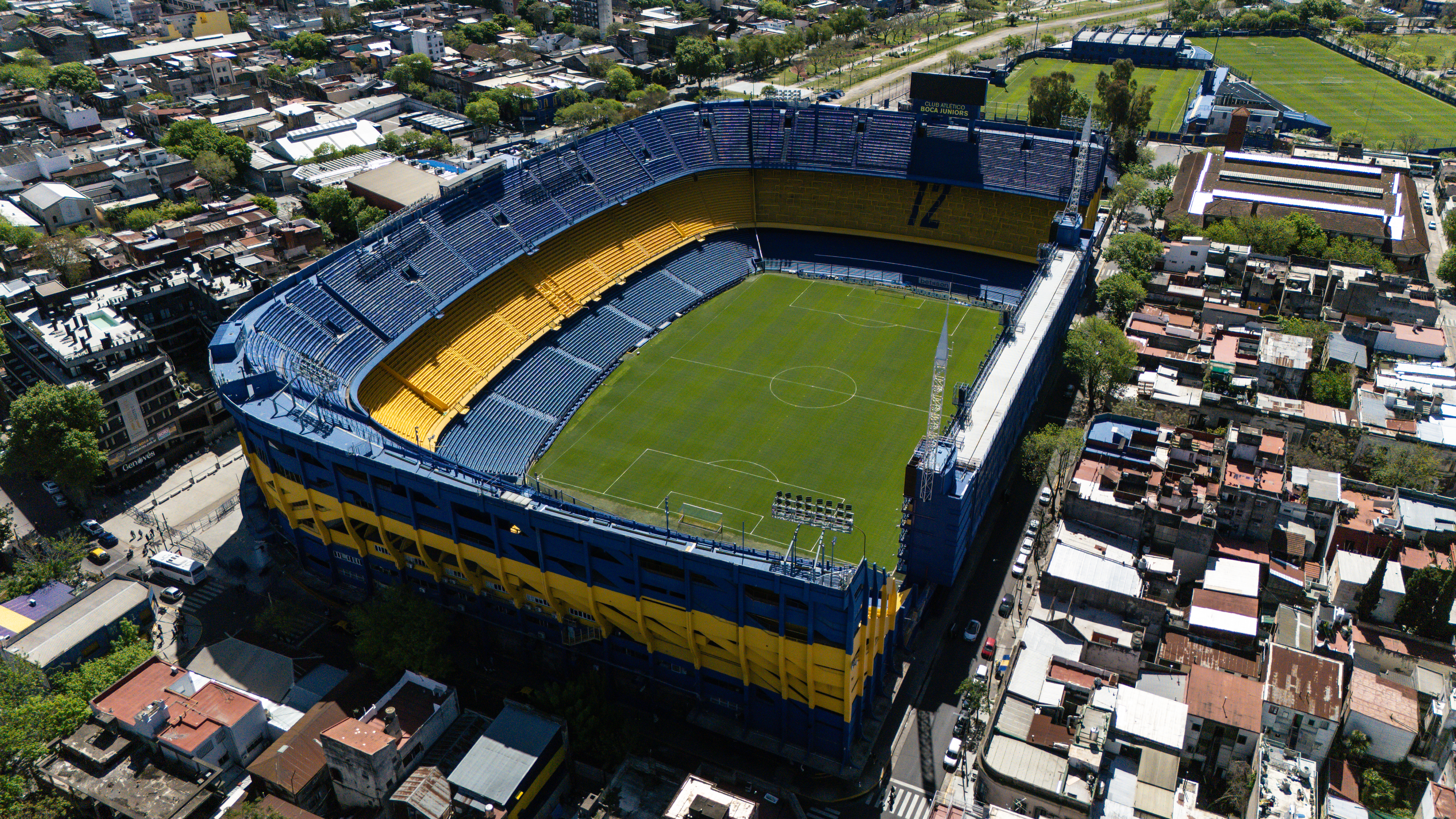
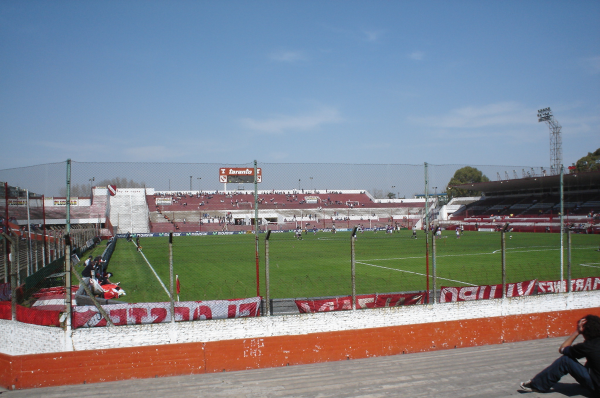
La Bombonera (left) and La Doble Visera, venues for the series

== Road to the final ==
(Argentina) Boca Juniors					(Argentina) Independiente			
Opponent	Agg.	1st leg	2nd leg	Round	Opponent	Agg.	1st leg	2nd leg
– (Note: Advanced directly to quarterfinals.)				First round	(Brazil) Santos	4–1	2–1 (A)	2–0 (H)
(Argentina) Racing	2–1	0–0 (H)	2–1 (A)	Quarter-finals	(Colombia) Atlético Nacional	4–2	2–2 (A)	2–0 (H)
(Brazil) Grêmio	2–0	0–0 (A)	2–0 (H)	Semi-finals	(Argentina) Argentinos Juniors	3–1	1–0 (A)	2–1 (H)

== Match details ==
=== First leg ===
1989 Supercopa Libertadores Finals
November 22, 1989
First leg

Boca Juniors (Argentina)	0–0	(Argentina) Independiente
	Report

La Bombonera, Buenos Aires
Attendance: 65,000
Referee: Francisco Lamolina (Argentina)

Boca Juniors	Independiente

GK	1	(Colombia) Carlos Navarro Montoya
DF	4	(Argentina) Ivar Stafuza
DF	2	(Argentina) Juan Simón (c)
DF	6	(Argentina) Víctor Hugo Marchesini
DF	3	(Argentina) José Luis Cuciuffo
MF	8	(Argentina) Blas Giunta
MF	5	(Argentina) Claudio Marangoni
MF	10	(Argentina) José Daniel Ponce
FW	11	(Argentina) Diego Latorre
FW	7	(Argentina) Alfredo Graciani
FW	9	(Argentina) Walter Perazzo	(substituted off) 84'
Substitutes:
MF	25	(Argentina) Sergio Berti	(substituted on) 84'
Manager:
(Argentina) Carlos Aimar

GK	12	(Uruguay) Eduardo Pereira
DF	13	(Argentina) Marcelo Morales
DF	2	(Argentina) Pedro Monzón
DF	6	(Paraguay) Rogelio Delgado	(substituted off) 45'
DF	4	(Argentina) Ricardo Altamirano
MF	8	(Argentina) José María Bianco
MF	5	(Argentina) Miguel Ángel Ludueña
MF	9	(Argentina) Ricardo Giusti (c)
MF	7	(Argentina) Rubén Darío Insúa
FW	21	(Argentina) Marcelo Reggiardo
FW	11	(Argentina) Carlos Alfaro Moreno	(substituted off) 66'
Substitutes:
DF		(Argentina) Walter Lozano	(substituted on) 45'
FW		(Argentina) Martín Félix Ubaldi	(substituted on) 66'
Manager:
(Argentina) Jorge Solari

=== Second leg ===
November 29, 1989
Second leg

Independiente (Argentina)	0–0	(Argentina) Boca Juniors
	Report
Penalties
Bianco (penalty scored); Altamirano (penalty scored); Insúa (penalty scored); Artime (penalty missed)	3–5	(penalty scored) Ponce; (penalty scored) Marchesini; (penalty scored) Latorre; (penalty scored) Stafuza; (penalty scored) Giunta

La Doble Visera, Avellaneda
Attendance: 70,000
Referee: Juan Bava (Argentina)

Independiente	Boca Juniors

GK	12	(Uruguay) Eduardo Pereira
DF	13	(Argentina) Marcelo Morales
DF	2	(Argentina) Pedro Monzón
DF	6	(Paraguay) Rogelio Delgado
DF	4	(Argentina) Ricardo Altamirano
MF	8	(Argentina) José María Bianco
MF	5	(Argentina) Miguel Ángel Ludueña
MF	9	(Argentina) Ricardo Giusti (c)
MF	7	(Argentina) Rubén Darío Insúa
FW	21	(Argentina) Marcelo Reggiardo	(substituted off) 60'
FW	11	(Argentina) Carlos Alfaro Moreno	(substituted off) 85'
Substitutes:
FW	10	(Argentina) Ricardo Bochini	(substituted on) 60'
MF	23	(Argentina) Luis Fabián Artime	(substituted on) 85'
Manager:
(Argentina) Jorge Solari

GK	1	(Colombia) Carlos Navarro Montoya
DF	4	(Argentina) Ivar Stafuza
DF	2	(Argentina) Juan Simón (c)
DF	6	(Argentina) Víctor Hugo Marchesini
DF	3	(Argentina) José Luis Cuciuffo
MF	8	(Argentina) Blas Giunta
MF	5	(Argentina) Claudio Marangoni
MF	10	(Argentina) José Daniel Ponce
FW	11	(Argentina) Diego Latorre
FW	7	(Argentina) Alfredo Graciani	(substituted off) 66'
FW	9	(Argentina) Walter Perazzo	(substituted off) 76'
Substitutes:
MF	23	(Argentina) Walter Reinaldo Pico	(substituted on) 66'
MF	25	(Argentina) Sergio Berti	(substituted on) 76'
Manager:
(Argentina) Carlos Aimar
