= 1994 Supercopa Libertadores finals =

- Event: 1994 Supercopa Libertadores
Boca Juniors	Independiente
(Argentina)	(Argentina)
1	2
- on goal difference

First Leg
Boca Juniors	Independiente
1	1
- Date: November 2, 1994
- Venue: La Bombonera, Buenos Aires
- Referee: Roberto Ruscio (Argentina)

Second Leg
Independiente	Boca Juniors
1	0
- Date: November 9, 1994
- Venue: La Doble Visera, Avellaneda
- Referee: Francisco Lamolina (Argentina)

The 1994 Supercopa Libertadores Finals was the two-legged football series to decide a winner of the 1994 Supercopa Libertadores. It was contested by two Argentine teams, Independiente and Boca Juniors, which met in a final again after their first series in 1989.

In the first leg, played in La Bombonera in Buenos Aires, both teams tied 1–1. In the second leg, played in La Doble Visera in Avellaneda, Independiente won 1–0, getting revenge on Boca Juniors for the previous final in order to claim their first Supercopa Libertadores title.

== Qualified teams ==
Team	Previous finals app.
(Argentina) Boca Juniors	**1989**
(Argentina) Independiente	1989

Bold indicates winning years

== Venues ==
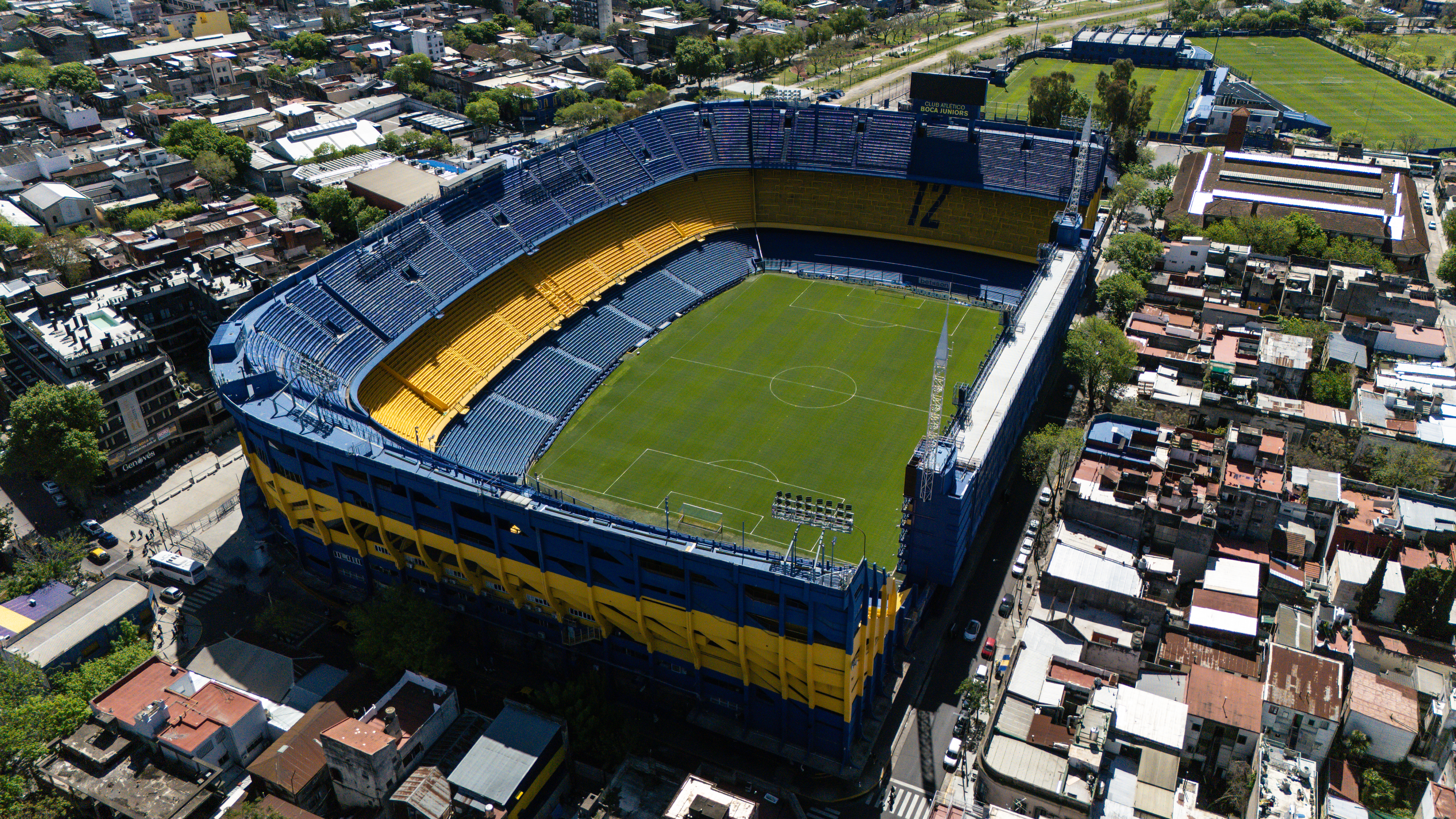
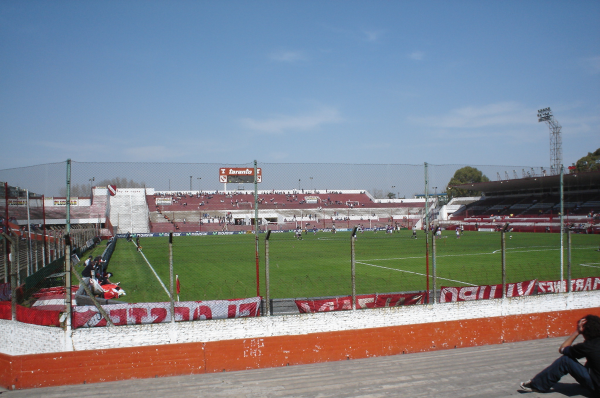
La Bombonera (left) and La Doble Visera, venues for the series

== Road to the final ==
(Argentina) Boca Juniors					(Argentina) Independiente			
Opponent	Agg.	1st leg	2nd leg	Round	Opponent	Agg.	1st leg	2nd leg
(Uruguay) Peñarol	4–2	0–1 (A)	4–1 (H)	First round	(Brazil) Santos	4–1	0–1 (A)	4–0 (H)
(Argentina) River Plate	1–1 (5–4 p)	0–0 (A)	1–1 (H)	Quarter-finals	(Brazil) Grêmio	3–1	1–1 (A)	2–0 (H)
(Brazil) São Paulo	2–1	2–0 (H)	0–1 (A)	Semi-finals	(Brazil) Cruzeiro	4–1	0–1 (A)	4–0 (H)

== Match details ==
=== First leg ===
1994 Supercopa Libertadores Finals
November 2, 1994
First leg

Boca Juniors (Argentina)	1–1	(Argentina) Independiente
Martínez 24'	Report	Rambert 72'

La Bombonera, Buenos Aires
Referee: Roberto Ruscio (Argentina)

**Boca Juniors**	**Independiente**

GK	1	(Colombia) (Argentina) Carlos Navarro Montoya
DF		(Argentina) Nelson Vivas	Yellow card
DF		(Argentina) Fernando Gamboa (c)
DF		(Argentina) Néstor Fabbri
DF	3	(Argentina) Carlos Mac Allister	Yellow card
MF	8	(Argentina) Roberto Acuña
MF	5	(Argentina) Alejandro Mancuso	(red card) 53'
MF	10	(Argentina) Alberto Márcico	Yellow card
FW	11	(Argentina) Luis Alberto Carranza	Yellow card
FW	7	(Argentina) Sergio Daniel Martínez	(substituted off) 55'
FW	9	(Uruguay) Ruben da Silva	(substituted off) 74'
Substitutes:
MF		(Argentina) Fabián Carrizo	(substituted on) 55' (yellow card)
FW		(Colombia) John Jairo Trellez	(substituted on) 74'
Manager:
(Argentina) César Luis Menotti

GK	1	(Argentina) Luis Islas (c)
DF	4	(Argentina) Néstor Craviotto
DF	19	(Argentina) Claudio Arzeno
DF	6	(Argentina) José Serrizuela
DF	3	(Argentina) Guillermo Ríos
MF	8	(Argentina) Diego Cagna
MF	5	(Argentina) Hugo Pérez
MF	10	(Argentina) Daniel Garnero
MF	7	(Argentina) Gustavo López	Substituted off
FW	9	(Colombia) Albeiro Usuriaga
FW	11	(Argentina) Sebastián Rambert	Substituted off
Substitutes:
FW	15	(Argentina) Ricardo Gareca	Substituted on
FW	16	(Argentina) Walter Parodi	Substituted on
Manager:
(Argentina) Miguel Ángel Brindisi

=== Second leg ===
November 9, 1994

Independiente (Argentina)	1–0	(Argentina) Boca Juniors
Rambert 55'	Report

La Doble Visera, Avellaneda
Referee: Francisco Lamolina (Argentina)

**Independiente**	**Boca Juniors**

GK	1	(Argentina) Luis Islas (c)
DF	4	(Argentina) Néstor Craviotto	Substituted off
DF	19	(Argentina) Claudio Arzeno
DF	6	(Argentina) José Serrizuela
DF	3	(Argentina) Guillermo Ríos
MF	8	(Argentina) Diego Cagna
MF	5	(Argentina) Hugo Pérez
MF	10	(Argentina) Daniel Garnero
MF	7	(Argentina) Gustavo López
FW	9	(Colombia) Albeiro Usuriaga	Substituted off
FW	11	(Argentina) Sebastián Rambert
Substitutes:
DF	13	(Argentina) Jorge Gordillo	Substituted on
MF	14	(Argentina) Raúl Alfredo Cascini	Substituted on
FW	15	(Argentina) Ricardo Gareca
FW	16	(Argentina) Walter Parodi
Manager:
(Argentina) Miguel Ángel Brindisi

GK	1	(Colombia) (Argentina) Carlos Navarro Montoya
DF		(Argentina) Nelson Vivas
DF		(Argentina) Fernando Gamboa (c)
DF		(Argentina) Néstor Fabbri
DF	3	(Argentina) Carlos Mac Allister
MF	8	(Argentina) Roberto Acuña
MF		(Argentina) Fabián Carrizo	(substituted off) 75'
MF	10	(Argentina) Alberto Márcico
FW	11	(Argentina) Luis Alberto Carranza	(substituted off) 75'
FW	7	(Argentina) Sergio Daniel Martínez
FW	9	(Uruguay) Ruben da Silva	(red card) 89'
Substitutes:
MF	22	(Argentina) Walter Pico	(substituted on) 75'
FW	23	(Colombia) John Jairo Trellez	(substituted on) 75'
GK	12	(Uruguay) Carlos E. Silva
DF	16	(Argentina) Luis Medero
FW	21	(Argentina) Silvio Rudman
Manager:
(Argentina) César Luis Menotti
