= Boca Juniors in international football =

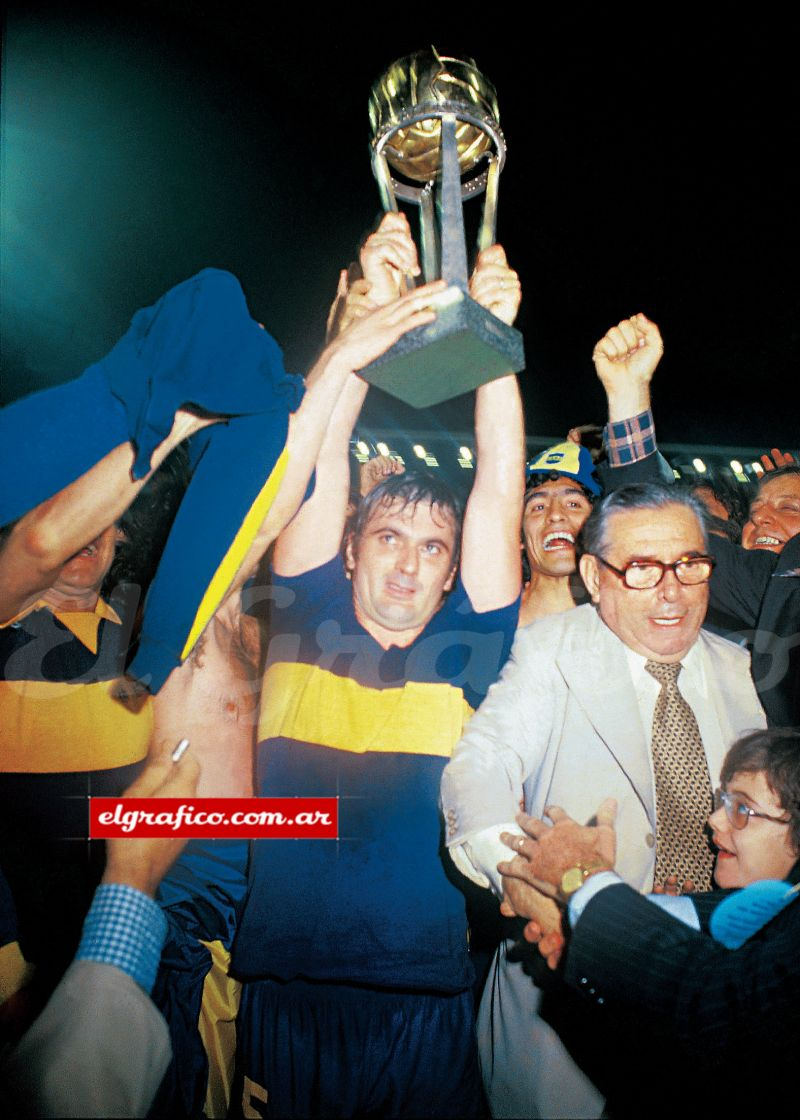
- Captain Rubén Suñé and president Alberto J. Armando with the Intercontinental Cup won against Borussia Mönchengladbach in 1978
- Club: Boca Juniors
- Most appearances: Roberto Abbondanzieri (100)
- Top scorer: Martín Palermo (43)
- First entry: 1963 Copa Libertadores
- Latest entry: 2026 Copa Libertadores

Titles
- Intercontinental Cup: 3: 1977; 2000; 2003
- Copa Libertadores: 6: 1977; 1978; 2000; 2001; 2003; 2007
- Copa Sudamericana: 3: 2004; 2005; 2026
- Recopa Sudamericana: 4: 1990; 2005; 2006; 2008
- Supercopa Libertadores: 1: 1989
- Copa de Oro: 1: 1993
- Supercopa Masters: 1: 1992

Boca Juniors is an Argentine professional football club based in Buenos Aires. The club first participated in a South American competition in 1919. The first international cup they took part in was the Copa Aldao in which they participated as champions of Argentina. The club competed in AFA/AUF cups from 1919 to 1946 and since entering the Copa Libertadores, in 1963, the club has competed in every CONMEBOL-organized competition, except the Copa CONMEBOL, Intercontinental Champions' Supercup, Suruga Bank Championship, Copa Merconorte, Copa Master de CONMEBOL and Copa Ganadores de Copa, most of them extinct.

Internationally, Boca Juniors has won a total of 23 international titles, with 19 organised by CONMEBOL and the rest organised jointly by the Argentine and Uruguayan Associations. Besides, the club is the second most successful team in the Copa Libertadores with 6 titles in 1977, 1978, 2000, 2001, 2003 and 2007, only behind CA Independiente. The club has also won the Recopa Sudamericana four times, in 1990, 2005, 2006 and 2008; and the Copa Sudamericana three times in 2004, 2005 and 2026, which is more than any other club for both trophies. Also, Boca won the Intercontinental Cup three times, in 1977, 2000 and 2003.

Behind Real Madrid (34) and Al-Ahly (26), Boca Juniors is, joint with Barcelona, the third most successful club in the world in terms of number of international titles (23).

== Overall record ==
The debut of Boca in international competitions took place in the 1919 as a participant in the Tie Cup. Boca participated in 6 AFA/AUF competitions and won 4, which are now fully recognised by CONMEBOL and FIFA. They are all defunct. Since 1963, Boca has regularly competed in CONMEBOL/FIFA competitions, the club registers 84 participations, winning 23 titles, they are listed in order of appearance. In bold, current competitions.
Legend: GF = Goals For. GA = Goals Against. GD = Goal Difference.

As of November 22, 2026

Competition	Pld	W	D	L	GF	GA	GD	Win %
Copa Aldao	3	0	1	2	3	7	−4	0.00
Tie Cup	1	1	0	0	2	0	+2	100.00
Copa de Honor Cousenier	1	1	0	0	2	0	+2	100.00
Copa Escobar-Gerona	4	3	0	1	13	9	+4	75.00
**Copa Libertadores**	341	172	90	79	499	291	+208	50.44
Intercontinental Cup	5	2	2	1	8	5	+3	40.00
Copa Interamericana	3	1	0	2	4	3	+1	33.33
Supercopa Libertadores	40	10	15	15	36	39	−3	25.00
**Recopa Sudamericana**	8	4	3	1	15	10	+5	50.00
Copa Master de Supercopa	2	2	0	0	3	1	+2	100.00
Copa de Oro	4	2	2	0	3	1	+2	50.00
Copa Iberoamericana	2	1	0	1	3	4	−1	50.00
Copa Mercosur	28	10	9	9	49	38	+11	35.71
**Copa Sudamericana**	61	25	19	17	83	57	+26	40.98
**FIFA Club World Cup**	5	1	2	2	7	9	−2	20.00
Total	**508**	**235**	**143**	**130**	**730**	**474**	**+256**	**46.26**

== Competitions ==
Notes
"(H)" denotes home ground, "(A)" denotes away ground and "(N)" symbolises neutral ground. The first score is always Boca's.

In South America, matches between clubs from different countries date back to the beginning of the 20th century, with the Rio de la Plata football championships. They were official competitions held jointly by the Argentine and the Uruguayan Associations, before Conmebol was created. Those tournaments include Copa Aldao –contested by the league champions of both associations–, the Copa de Honor Cousenier –contested by winners of "Honor Cups" in both sides– and the Cup Tie Competition, contested by winners of "Copa de Competencia" in both countries. Boca Juniors also participated in the Copa Escobar-Gerona (created when Conmebol already existed), winning two titles. Conmebol has mentioned those competitions as "the first official and international matches between clubs in South America". The South American Football Confederation (CONMEBOL) has organized different competitions at club level throughout history. The first competition organized by Conmebol was the South American Championship of Champions in 1948, at the initiative of the Colo-Colo club, which had the idea of organizing a tournament with the champions of each of the local leagues in South America, and the winner was designated as the South American champion. After this contest, the dispute of the official international championships was interrupted until 1960, when the South American teams began to participate in the Copa de Campeones de América, which adopted the name of Copa Libertadores de América in 1965. At the beginning, only the league champions participated, but with the passing of the editions, the number of participating teams has expanded. Due to this, the Argentine Soccer Association (AFA) has developed different classification methods for Conmebol tournaments. The formats were varying on the different occasions in which they were implemented, in addition to having different amounts of places to participate in the maximum international tournament. Over the years, many competitions were implemented, of which most were discontinued. The FIFA competitions are the Intercontinental Cup/FIFA Club World Cup, to which can only qualify by virtue of winning the Copa Libertadores.

=== Copa Aldao ===
The Copa Aldao was an AFA/AUF club competition contested annually, albeit irregularly, between the league champions of Argentina and Uruguay. The cup is one of several inter-South American club competitions that have been organised on the continent. The first competition was scheduled for the 1913 season (although it was never played) and the last in 1955 (actually played in 1959, no champions proclaimed). The Copa Ricardo Aldao is seen today as the first stepping-stone into the creation of Copa Libertadores. Boca played in 1919, 1920, and 1940, but could never win the title.

Season	Opposition	Home	Away	Aggregate	Notes
1919	(Uruguay) Nacional	0–3 (A)			
1920	(Uruguay) Nacional	1–2 (H)			
1940	(Uruguay) Nacional	2–2 (A)			

=== Tie Cup ===
The Tie Cup was a football tournament played between representatives of the Argentina and Uruguay Associations. It was one of the earliest international football tournaments played between members of different national football associations, played on an annual basis until 1919. The competition was inspired by English FA Cup. Boca played and won in 1919, in the last edition of the tournament.

Season	Opposition	Home	Away	Aggregate	Notes
1919	(Uruguay) Nacional	2–0 (H)			

=== Copa de Honor Cousenier ===
The Copa de Honor Cousenier was an international football club competition which was played 13 times between representatives of the Argentina and Uruguay associations between 1905 and 1920. The trophy was donated by "E. Cusenier Fils Auné & Cie.", a French liqueur company. The format of the cup consisted in a final between the last champions of Argentine Copa de Honor and Uruguayan Copa de Honor. If necessary, a second match was played. It was similar to Tie Cup but the final games were played at Montevideo instead of Buenos Aires. Boca played and won in 1920, in the last edition of the tournament.

Season	Opposition	Home	Away	Aggregate	Notes
1920	(Uruguay) Universal	2–0 (A)			

=== Copa Escobar-Gerona ===
The Copa Escobar-Gerona was an official football competition organized by both bodies, the Argentine and Uruguayan football association, being first held in 1941. The Cup was played between the Primera División runners-up of Argentina and Uruguay, with a two match format, played in each country. This competition was played simultaneously with the Copa Aldao. The trophy was donated by Mr. Ramiro Jouan and named after Adrián Escobar and Héctor Gerona, presidents of the Argentine and Uruguayan associations respectively. Boca played and won in 1945 and 1946, in the last editions of the tournament.

Season	Opposition	Home	Away	Aggregate	Notes
1945	(Uruguay) Nacional	1–2	3–2	4–4	
1946	(Uruguay) Peñarol	6–3	3–2	9–5	

=== Copa Libertadores ===
The Copa Libertadores is the highest level of competition in South American club football and has had several different formats over its lifetime. Boca first participated in 1963. The club is the second most successful team in the competition with 6 titles in 1977, 1978, 2000, 2001, 2003 and 2007, only behind Independiente. It is also the team with the most finals played (12) and is in third place in the historical table.

Season	Round	Opposition	Home	Away	Aggregate	Notes
1963
1963	Group 3	(Paraguay) Olimpia	5–3	0–1	1st	
1963	Group 3	Universidad de Chile	1–0	3–2	1st	
1963	Semifinal	(Uruguay) Peñarol	1–0	2–1	3–1	
1963	Final	(Brazil) Santos	1–2	2–3	3–5	
1965
1965	Group 1	(Ecuador) Deportivo Quito	4–0	2–1	1st	
1965	Group 1	(Bolivia) The Strongest	2–0	3–2	1st	
1965	Semifinal	(Argentina) Independiente	1–0	0–2	1–2 (po 0–0 (a.e.t.), (gd))	
1966
1966	Group 1	(Argentina) River Plate	2–0	1–2	2nd	
1966	Group 1	(Peru) Universitario	2–0	1–2	2nd	
1966	Group 1	(Peru) Alianza Lima	0–1	1–0	2nd	
1966	Group 1	(Venezuela) Deportivo Italia	5–2	2–1	2nd	
1966	Group 1	(Venezuela) Lara	2–1	3–0	2nd	
1966	Semifinal (Group A)	(Paraguay) Guaraní	1–1	3–1	3rd	
1966	Semifinal (Group A)	(Argentina) Independiente	0–2	0–0	3rd	
1966	Semifinal (Group A)	(Argentina) River Plate	1–0	2–2	3rd	
1970
1970	First stage (Group 1)	(Argentina) River Plate	2–1	3–1	1st	
1970	First stage (Group 1)	(Bolivia) Bolívar	2–0	3–2	1st	
1970	First stage (Group 1)	(Bolivia) Universitario	4–0	0–0	1st	
1970	Second stage (Group 1)	(Peru) Universitario	1–0	3–1	2nd	
1970	Second stage (Group 1)	(Argentina) River Plate	1–1	0–1	2nd	
1971
1971	Group 1	(Argentina) Rosario Central	2–1	w.o.	3rd	
1971	Group 1	(Peru) Sporting Cristal	2–2	0–2	3rd	
1971	Group 1	(Peru) Universitario	w.o.	0–0	3rd	
1977
1977	Group 1	(Argentina) River Plate	1–0	0–0	1st	
1977	Group 1	(Uruguay) Defensor Sporting	2–0	0–0	1st	
1977	Group 1	(Uruguay) Peñarol	1–0	1–0	1st	
1977	Semifinal (Group A)	(Paraguay) Libertad	1–0	1–0	1st	
1977	Semifinal (Group A)	(Colombia) Deportivo Cali	1–1	1–1	1st	
1977	Final	(Brazil) Cruzeiro	1–0	0–1	1–1 (po 0–0 (a.e.t.)), (5–4 p) (N))	
1978
1978	Semifinal (Group A)	(Argentina) River Plate	0–0	2–0	1st	
1978	Semifinal (Group A)	(Brazil) Atlético Mineiro	3–1	2–1	1st	
1978	Final	(Colombia) Deportivo Cali	4–0	0–0	4–0	
1979
1979	Semifinal (Group A)	(Uruguay) Peñarol	1–0	0–0	1st (po 1–0 (a.e.t.))	
1979	Semifinal (Group A)	(Argentina) Independiente	2–0	0–1	1st (po 1–0 (a.e.t.))	
1979	Final	(Paraguay) Olimpia	0–0	0–2	0–2	
1982
1982	Group 1	(Bolivia) Jorge Wilstermann	2–2	0–1	4th	
1982	Group 1	(Argentina) River Plate	0–0	0–1	4th	
1982	Group 1	(Bolivia) The Strongest	1–0	0–1	4th	
1986
1986	Group 1	(Argentina) River Plate	1–1	0–1	3rd	
1986	Group 1	(Uruguay) Peñarol	1–1	2–1	3rd	
1986	Group 1	(Uruguay) Montevideo Wanderers	3–2	0–2	3rd	
1989
1989	Group 4	(Argentina) Racing	0–0	3–2	1st (po 3–1)	
1989	Group 4	(Peru) Universitario	2–0	0–1	1st (po 3–1)	
1989	Group 4	(Peru) Sporting Cristal	4–3	0–1	1st (po 3–1)	
1989	Round of 16	(Paraguay) Olimpia	5–3	0–2	5–5, (6–7 p)	
1991
1991	Group 1	(Argentina) River Plate	4–3	2–0	2nd	
1991	Group 1	(Bolivia) Bolívar	0–0	0–2	2nd	
1991	Group 1	(Bolivia) Oriente Petrolero	0–0	0–1	2nd	
1991	Round of 16	(Brazil) Corinthians	3–1	1–1	4–2	
1991	Quarterfinal	(Brazil) Flamengo	3–0	1–2	4–2	
1991	Semifinal	(Chile) Colo-Colo	1–0	1–3	2–3	
1994
1994	Group 2	(Argentina) Vélez Sarsfield	1–2	1–1	4th	
1994	Group 2	(Brazil) Palmeiras	2–1	1–6	4th	
1994	Group 2	(Brazil) Cruzeiro	1–2	1–2	4th	
2000
2000	Group 2	(Bolivia) Blooming	6–1	0–1	1st	
2000	Group 2	(Chile) Universidad Católica	2–1	3–1	1st	
2000	Group 2	(Uruguay) Peñarol	3–1	0–0	1st	
2000	Round of 16	(Ecuador) El Nacional	5–3	0–0	5–3	
2000	Quarterfinal	(Argentina) River Plate	3–0	1–2	4–2	
2000	Semifinal	(Mexico) América	4–1	1–3	5–4	
2000	Final	(Brazil) Palmeiras	2–2	0–0	2–2, (4–2 p)	
2001
2001	Group 8	(Bolivia) Oriente Petrolero	2–1	1–0	1st	
2001	Group 8	(Chile) Cobreloa	1–0	1–0	1st	
2001	Group 8	(Colombia) Deportivo Cali	2–1	0–3	1st	
2001	Round of 16	(Colombia) Junior	1–1	3–2	4–3	
2001	Quarterfinal	(Brazil) Vasco da Gama	3–0	1–0	4–0	
2001	Semifinal	(Brazil) Palmeiras	2–2	2–2	4–4, (3–2 p)	
2001	Final	(Mexico) Cruz Azul	0–1	1–0	1–1, (3–1 p)	
2002
2002	Group 6	(Chile) Santiago Wanderers	0–0	0–1	1st	
2002	Group 6	(Ecuador) Emelec	1–0	2–1	1st	
2002	Group 6	(Uruguay) Montevideo Wanderers	2–0	2–0	1st	
2002	Round of 16	(Ecuador) El Nacional	2–0	0–0	2–0	
2002	Quarterfinal	(Paraguay) Olimpia	1–1	0–1	1–2	
2003
2003	Group 7	(Colombia) Independiente Medellín	2–0	0–1	2nd	
2003	Group 7	(Chile) Colo-Colo	2–2	2–1	2nd	
2003	Group 7	(Ecuador) Barcelona	2–1	2–2	2nd	
2003	Round of 16	(Brazil) Paysandu	0–1	4–2	4–3	
2003	Quarterfinal	(Chile) Cobreloa	2–1	2–1	4–2	
2003	Semifinal	(Colombia) América de Cali	2–0	4–0	6–0	
2003	Final	(Brazil) Santos	2–0	3–1	5–1	
2004
2004	Group 8	(Bolivia) Bolívar	3–0	1–3	1st	
2004	Group 8	(Chile) Colo-Colo	2–0	0–1	1st	
2004	Group 8	(Colombia) Deportivo Cali	1–0	3–0	1st	
2004	Round of 16	(Peru) Sporting Cristal	2–1	3–2	5–3	
2004	Quarterfinal	(Brazil) São Caetano	1–1	0–0	1–1, (4–3 p)	
2004	Semifinal	(Argentina) River Plate	1–0	1–2	2–2, (5–4 p)	
2004	Final	(Colombia) Once Caldas	0–0	1–1	1–1, (0–2 p)	
2005
2005	Group 8	(Ecuador) Deportivo Cuenca	3–0	0–0	1st	
2005	Group 8	(Peru) Sporting Cristal	3–0	3–0	1st	
2005	Group 8	(Mexico) Pachuca	4–0	1–3	1st	
2005	Round of 16	(Colombia) Junior	4–0	3–3	7–3	
2005	Quarterfinal	(Mexico) Guadalajara	0–0	0–4	0–4	
2007
2007	Group 7	(Bolivia) Bolívar	7–0	0–0	2nd	
2007	Group 7	(Peru) Cienciano	1–0	0–3	2nd	
2007	Group 7	(Mexico) Toluca	3–0	0–2	2nd	
2007	Round of 16	(Argentina) Vélez Sarsfield	3–0	1–3	4–3	
2007	Quarterfinal	(Paraguay) Libertad	1–1	2–0	3–1	
2007	Semifinal	(Colombia) Cúcuta Deportivo	3–0	1–3	4–3	
2007	Final	(Brazil) Grêmio	3–0	2–0	5–0	
2008
2008	Group 3	(Venezuela) Maracaibo	3–0	1–1	2nd	
2008	Group 3	(Mexico) Atlas	3–0	1–3	2nd	
2008	Group 3	(Chile) Colo-Colo	4–3	0–2	2nd	
2008	Round of 16	(Brazil) Cruzeiro	2–1	2–1	4–2	
2008	Quarterfinal	(Mexico) Atlas	2–2	3–0	5–2	
2008	Semifinal	(Brazil) Fluminense	2–2	1–3	3–5	
2009
2009	Group 2	(Ecuador) Deportivo Cuenca	1–0	0–1	1st	
2009	Group 2	(Venezuela) Deportivo Táchira	3–0	1–0	1st	
2009	Group 2	(Paraguay) Guaraní	3–1	3–1	1st	
2009	Round of 16	(Uruguay) Defensor Sporting	0–1	2–2	2–3	
2012
2012	Group 4	(Venezuela) Zamora	2–0	0–0	2nd	
2012	Group 4	(Brazil) Fluminense	1–2	2–0	2nd	
2012	Group 4	(Argentina) Arsenal	2–0	2–1	2nd	
2012	Round of 16	(Chile) Unión Española	2–1	3–2	5–3	
2012	Quarterfinal	(Brazil) Fluminense	1–0	1–1	2–1	
2012	Semifinal	Universidad de Chile	2–0	0–0	2–0	
2012	Final	(Brazil) Corinthians	1–1	0–2	1–3	
2013
2013	Group 1	(Mexico) Toluca	1–2	2–3	2nd	
2013	Group 1	(Ecuador) Barcelona	1–0	2–1	2nd	
2013	Group 1	(Uruguay) Nacional	0–1	1–0	2nd	
2013	Round of 16	(Brazil) Corinthians	1–0	1–1	2–1	
2013	Quarterfinal	(Argentina) Newell's Old Boys	0–0	0–0	0–0, (9–10 p)	
2015
2015	Group 5	(Chile) Palestino	2–0	2–0	1st	
2015	Group 5	(Uruguay) Montevideo Wanderers	2–1	3–0	1st	
2015	Group 5	(Venezuela) Zamora	5–0	5–1	1st	
2015	Round of 16	(Argentina) River Plate	0–0	0–1	0–1	
2016
2016	Group 3	(Colombia) Deportivo Cali	6–2	0–0	1st	
2016	Group 3	(Argentina) Racing	0–0	1–0	1st	
2016	Group 3	(Bolivia) Bolívar	3–1	1–1	1st	
2016	Round of 16	(Paraguay) Cerro Porteño	3–1	2–1	5–2	
2016	Quarterfinal	(Uruguay) Nacional	1–1	1–1	2–2, (4–3 p)	
2016	Semifinal	(Ecuador) Independiente del Valle	2–3	1–2	3–5	
2018
2018	Group H	(Peru) Alianza Lima	5–0	0–0	2nd	
2018	Group H	(Colombia) Junior	1–0	1–1	2nd	
2018	Group H	(Brazil) Palmeiras	0–2	1–1	2nd	
2018	Round of 16	(Paraguay) Libertad	2–0	4–2	6–2	
2018	Quarterfinal	(Brazil) Cruzeiro	2–0	1–1	3–1	
2018	Semifinal	(Brazil) Palmeiras	2–0	2–2	4–2	
2018	Final	(Argentina) River Plate	2–2	1–3 (a.e.t.)	3–5	
2019
2019	Group G	(Bolivia) Jorge Wilstermann	4–0	0–0	1st	
2019	Group G	(Colombia) Deportes Tolima	3–0	2–2	1st	
2019	Group G	(Brazil) Athletico Paranaense	2–1	0–3	1st	
2019	Round of 16	(Brazil) Athletico Paranaense	2–0	1–0	3–0	
2019	Quarterfinal	(Ecuador) LDU Quito	0–0	3–0	3–0	
2019	Semifinal	(Argentina) River Plate	1–0	0–2	1–2	
2020
2020	Group H	(Venezuela) Caracas	3–0	1–1	1st	
2020	Group H	(Colombia) Independiente Medellín	3–0	1–0	1st	
2020	Group H	(Paraguay) Libertad	0–0	2–0	1st	
2020	Round of 16	(Brazil) Internacional	0–1	1–0	1–1, (5–4 p)	
2020	Quarterfinal	(Argentina) Racing	2–0	0–1	2–1	
2020	Semifinal	(Brazil) Santos	0–0	0–3	0–3	
2021
2021	Group C	(Bolivia) The Strongest	3–0	1–0	2nd	
2021	Group C	(Brazil) Santos	2–0	0–1	2nd	
2021	Group C	(Ecuador) Barcelona	0–0	0–1	2nd	
2021	Round of 16	(Brazil) Atlético Mineiro	0–0	0–0	0–0, (1–3 p)	
2022
2022	Group E	(Colombia) Deportivo Cali	1–0	0–2	1st	
2022	Group E	(Bolivia) Always Ready	2–0	1–0	1st	
2022	Group E	(Brazil) Corinthians	1–1	0–2	1st	
2022	Round of 16	(Brazil) Corinthians	0–0	0–0	0–0, (5–6 p)	
2023	Group F	(Venezuela) Monagas	4–0	0–0	1st	
2023	Group F	(Colombia) Deportivo Pereira	2–1	0–1	1st	
2023	Group F	(Chile) Colo-Colo	1–0	2–0	1st	
2023	Round of 16	(Uruguay) Nacional	2–2	0–0	2–2, (4–2 p)	
2023	Quarterfinal	(Argentina) Racing	0–0	0–0	0–0, (4–1 p)	
2023	Semifinal	(Brazil) Palmeiras	0–0	1–1	1–1, (4–2 p)	
2023	Final	(Brazil) Fluminense	1–2 (a.e.t.), (N)			
2025	Second qualifying stage	(Peru) Alianza Lima	2–1	0–1	2–2, (4–5 p)	
2026
2026	Group D	(Chile) Universidad Católica	0–1	2–1	3rd	
2026	Group D	(Ecuador) Barcelona	3–0	0–1	3rd	
2026	Group D	(Brazil) Cruzeiro	1–1	0–1	3rd	

=== Copa Interamericana ===
The Copa Interamericana was an annual club football competition organized by CONCACAF and CONMEBOL from 1969, to 1998. The competition was supposed to be contested between the winners of the North American CONCACAF Champions League and the South American Copa Libertadores tournaments although the participants have varied at times. Boca participated only once, in 1978, as 1977 Copa Libertadores champion and lost against Mexican side América. With the traditional format, Boca would have won the title, but the rules stipulated that to win the title more points had to be accumulated than the rival and no more goals, so an extra playoff had to be played, where Boca lost.

Season	Opposition	Home	Away	Aggregate	Notes
1977	(Mexico) América	3–0	0–1	3–1, 1–2 (po) (a.e.t.)	

=== Supercopa Sudamericana ===
The Supercopa Libertadores, also known as the Supercopa Sudamericana, was a football club competition contested annually between 1988 and 1997 by the past winners of the Copa Libertadores. The competition was discontinued to make way for the Copa Mercosur and Copa Merconorte in 1998. Boca participated in all the editions, winning the 1989 edition and being runner-up in 1994.

Season	Round	Opposition	Home	Away	Aggregate	Notes
1988	Round of 16	(Brazil) Gremio	1–0	0–2	1–2	
1989
1989	Quarterfinal	(Argentina) Racing	0–0	2–1	2–1	
1989	Semifinal	(Brazil) Gremio	2–0	0–0	2–0	
1989	Final	(Argentina) Independiente	0–0	0–0	0–0, (5–3 p)	
1990	Quarterfinal	(Uruguay) Peñarol	0–2	1–0	1–2	
1991	Round of 16	(Uruguay) Nacional	1–1	0–2	1–3	
1992	Round of 16	(Argentina) Estudiantes	2–1	0–1	2–2, (3–4 p)	
1993	Round of 16	(Argentina) Estudiantes	1–3	0–2	1–5	
1994
1994	Round of 16	(Uruguay) Peñarol	4–1	0–1	4–2	
1994	Quarterfinal	(Argentina) River Plate	1–1	0–0	1–1, (5–4 p)	
1994	Semifinal	(Brazil) São Paulo	2–0	0–1	2–1	
1994	Final	(Argentina) Independiente	1–1	0–1	1–2	
1995
1995	First stage	(Paraguay) Olimpia	1–2	1–1	3rd	
1995	First stage	(Brazil) São Paulo	2–3	0–1	3rd	
1996
1996	First stage	(Argentina) Argentinos Juniors	3–0	2–0	1st	
1996	First stage	(Argentina) Racing	1–1	0–0	1st	
1996	Quarterfinal	(Brazil) Cruzeiro	0–0	1–1	1–1, (6–7 p)	
1997
1997	Group 1	(Argentina) Independiente	1–1	1–2	4th	
1997	Group 1	(Brazil) Cruzeiro	1–0	1–2	4th	
1997	Group 1	(Chile) Colo-Colo	2–2	1–2	4th	

=== Recopa Sudamericana ===
The Recopa Sudamericana is an annual international club football competition organized by CONMEBOL since 1988. It is a match-up between the champions of the previous year's Copa Libertadores and the Copa Sudamericana, South America's premier club competitions. The competition has had several formats over its lifetime. Initially, the champions of the Copa Libertadores and Supercopa Libertadores contested it. In 1998, the Supercopa Libertadores was discontinued and the Recopa went into a hiatus. The competition has been disputed with either a presently-used two-legged series or a single match-up at a neutral venue. Boca is the most successful club in the cup history, having won the tournament four times, in 1990, 2005, 2006 and 2008. The club also lost in the 2004 edition.

Season	Opposition	Home	Away	Aggregate	Notes
1990	(Colombia) Atlético Nacional	1–0 (N)			
2004	(Peru) Cienciano	1–1, (2–4 p) (N)			
2005	(Colombia) Once Caldas	3–1	1–2	4–3	
2006	(Brazil) São Paulo	2–1	2–2	4–3	
2008	(Argentina) Arsenal	2–2	3–1	5–3	

=== Copa Master de Supercopa ===
The Copa Master de Supercopa was a football competition contested by clubs that had previously won the Supercopa Libertadores. It was organized by CONMEBOL and only played in 1992 and 1995. The format of the tournament was different in both editions. Boca only played in the 1992 edition, tournament that won.

Season	Round	Opposition	Home	Away	Aggregate	Notes
1992
1992	Semifinal	(Paraguay) Olimpia	1–0 (N)			
1992	Final	(Brazil) Cruzeiro	2–1 (N)			

=== Copa de Oro ===
The Copa de Oro was a football competition cup winners' cup competition contested on 3 occasions by the most recent winners of all CONMEBOL continental competitions. These included champions of the Copa Libertadores, Supercopa Sudamericana, Copa CONMEBOL, Copa Master de Supercopa and Copa Master de CONMEBOL. Boca only played in the 1993 edition, as 1992 Copa Master de Supercopa champion, and won the title, being the only club from Argentina to win the competition.

Season	Round	Opposition	Home	Away	Aggregate	Notes
1993
1993	Semifinal	(Brazil) São Paulo	1–0	1–1 (a.e.t.)	2–1	
1993	Final	(Brazil) Atlético Mineiro	1–0	0–0	1–0	

=== Copa Iberoamericana ===
The Copa Iberoamericana was an international official football competition. It was created to face the champions of the Copa de Oro and the Copa del Rey, because of an agreement signed between CONMEBOL and the Royal Spanish Football Federation. It was disputed only once between Boca Juniors and Real Madrid in 1994, with victory to the Spanish club. After two decades, in 2015 CONMEBOL recognised the Copa Iberoamericana as an official tournament.

Season	Opposition	Home	Away	Aggregate	Notes
1994	(Spain) Real Madrid	2–1	1–3	3–4	

=== Copa Mercosur ===
The Copa Mercosur was a football competition played from 1998 to 2001 by the traditional top clubs from Brazil, Argentina, Uruguay, Paraguay, and Chile. The competition was created by CONMEBOL to generate TV money to the participating teams, but it went beyond and ended up, together with the Copa Merconorte, as natural replacement to the CONMEBOL Cup. These two, Copa Merconorte and Copa Mercosur, were replaced in 2002 by the Copa Sudamericana. Boca played in all the editions and never advanced from the quarterfinal stage.

Season	Round	Opposition	Home	Away	Aggregate	Notes
1998
1998	Group D	(Argentina) Vélez Sarsfield	0–1	1–2	2nd	
1998	Group D	(Paraguay) Cerro Porteño	3–1	2–3	2nd	
1998	Group D	(Brazil) Flamengo	3–0	2–0	2nd	
1998	Quarterfinal	(Brazil) Palmeiras	1–1	1–3	2–4	
1999
1999	Group C	(Brazil) São Paulo	5–1	1–1	2nd	
1999	Group C	(Argentina) San Lorenzo	0–1	0–1	2nd	
1999	Group C	(Chile) Universidad Católica	1–0	3–1	2nd	
2000
2000	Group D	(Paraguay) Olimpia	5–2	1–0	1st	
2000	Group D	(Brazil) Corinthians	3–0	2–2	1st	
2000	Group D	(Uruguay) Nacional	1–1	3–3	1st	
2000	Quarterfinal	(Brazil) Atlético Mineiro	2–2	0–2	2–4	
2001
2001	Group A	(Brazil) Vasco da Gama	2–2	2–2	4th	
2001	Group A	(Paraguay) Cerro Porteño	0–0	1–2	4th	
2001	Group A	(Chile) Universidad Católica	3–2	1–2	4th	

=== Copa Sudamericana ===
The Copa Sudamericana is an annual international club football competition organized by CONMEBOL since 2002, replacing the separate competitions Copa Merconorte and Copa Mercosur (that had replaced Copa CONMEBOL) by a single competition, so the Sudamericana is considered a merger of this three defunct tournaments. Since its introduction, the competition has been a pure elimination tournament with the number of rounds and teams varying from year to year. Boca Juniors was invited to the tournament between the editions 2002 to 2009 and with three titles, in 2004, 2005 and 2026, Boca is the most successful clubs in the cup's history.

Season	Round	Opposition	Home	Away	Aggregate	Notes
2002	Round of 16	(Argentina) Gimnasia y Esgrima	0–0	1–3	1–3	
2003
2003	Second stage	(Argentina) Colón	2–1	1–1	3–2	
2003	Quarterfinal	(Colombia) Atlético Nacional	0–1	1–4	1–5	
2004
2004	Second stage	(Argentina) San Lorenzo	2–1	0–1	2–2, (4–1 p)	
2004	Quarterfinal	(Paraguay) Cerro Porteño	0–0	1–1	1–1, (8–7 p)	
2004	Semifinal	(Brazil) Internacional	4–2	0–0	4–2	
2004	Final	(Bolivia) Bolívar	2–0	0–1	2–1	
2005
2005	Round of 16	(Paraguay) Cerro Porteño	5–1	2–2	7–3	
2005	Quarterfinal	(Brazil) Internacional	4–1	0–1	4–2	
2005	Semifinal	(Chile) Universidad Católica	2–2	1–0	3–2	
2005	Final	(Mexico) UNAM	1–1	1–1	2–2, (4–3 p)	
2006	Round of 16	(Uruguay) Nacional	2–1	1–2	3–3 (1–3 p)	
2007	Round of 16	(Brazil) São Paulo	2–1	0–1	2–2 (a)	
2008
2008	Round of 16	(Ecuador) LDU Quito	4–0	1–1	5–1	
2008	Quarterfinal	(Brazil) Internacional	1–2	0–2	1–4	
2009	First stage	(Argentina) Vélez Sarsfield	1–1	0–1	1–2	
2012	Second stage	(Argentina) Independiente	3–3	0–0	3–3 (a)	
2014
2014	Second stage	(Argentina) Rosario Central	3–0	1–1	4–1	
2014	Round of 16	(Paraguay) Deportivo Capiatá	0–1	1–0	1–1, (4–3 p)	
2014	Quarterfinal	(Paraguay) Cerro Porteño	1–0	4–1	5–1	
2014	Semifinal	(Argentina) River Plate	0–0	0–1	0–1	
2024
2024	Group D	(Bolivia) Nacional Potosí	4–0	0–0	2nd	
2024	Group D	(Paraguay) Sportivo Trinidense	1–0	2–1	2nd	
2024	Group D	(Brazil) Fortaleza	1–1	2–4	2nd	
2024	Knockout round play-offs	(Ecuador) Independiente del Valle	1–0	0–0	1–0	
2024	Round of 16	(Brazil) Cruzeiro	1–0	1–2	2–2, (4–5 p)	
2026	Knockout round play-offs	(Chile) O'Higgins	1–0	0–1	1–1, (4–3 p)	
2026	Round of 16	(Paraguay) Recoleta	3–1	4–0	7–1	
2026	Quarterfinal	(Brazil) São Paulo	1–0	1–1	2–1	
2026	Semifinal	(Brazil) Vasco da Gama	0–1	3–1	3–2	
2026	Final	(Brazil) Atlético Mineiro	2–0, (N)			

=== Intercontinental Cup ===
In 1960, UEFA and CONMEBOL, created the Intercontinental Cup as a way of determining the best team in the world, by pitting the winners of the European UEFA Champions League and the South American Copa Libertadores against each other. As Copa Libertadores winner, Boca qualified to the 1977, 1978, 2000, 2001 and 2003, winning in 1977, 2000 and 2003 and losing in 2001. In 1978, European Cup champions Liverpool declined to participate, and Boca declined to face Brugge, the runners-up, leaving the edition undisputed. From 1960 to 1979, the Intercontinental Cup was played in two legs and from 1980, the final became a single match. Boca was one of the five teams to win 3 editions, with Milan, Peñarol, Real Madrid and Nacional.

Season	Opposition	Home	Away	Aggregate	Notes
1977	(West Germany) Borussia Mönchengladbach	2–2	3–0	5–2	
~~1978~~	—	—	—	—	
2000	(Spain) Real Madrid	2–1 (N)			
2001	(Germany) Bayern Munich	0–1 (a.e.t.) (N)			
2003	(Italy) Milan	1–1 (a.e.t.) (3–1 p) (N)			

=== FIFA Club World Cup ===
In 2000, FIFA launched their international club competition called the FIFA Club World Championship, featuring teams from all of its member associations. In the second edition — renamed the FIFA Club World Cup — in 2005, FIFA took over the Intercontinental Cup, subsuming it into its own competition. The current format of the tournament involves seven teams competing for the title at venues within the host nation over a period of about two weeks; the winners of that year's AFC Champions League (Asia), CAF Champions League (Africa), CONCACAF Champions League (North America), Copa Libertadores (South America), OFC Champions League (Oceania) and UEFA Champions League (Europe), along with the host nation's national champions, participate in a straight knock-out tournament. FIFA recognises the Intercontinental Cup as the sole direct predecessor of the Club World Cup, and the champions of both aforementioned competitions are the only ones uncontroversially officially recognised as Club World Champions in the FIFA Club World Cup Statistical Kit, the official document of FIFA's club competition. Boca initially qualified for the 2001 tournament, in Spain, but the competition was cancelled before it started. The club qualified for the 2007 edition as Copa Libertadores winner and lost in the final. Then on 2025 the tournament expanded to 32 teams and Boca qualified by being in the top two of a club ranking of the four-year period.

Season	Round	Opposition	Home	Away	Aggregate	Notes
~~2001~~	—	—	—	—	—	
2007
2007	Semifinal	(Tunisia) Étoile du Sahel	1–0 (N)			
2007	Final	(Italy) Milan	2–4 (N)			
2025	Group C	(Portugal) Benfica	2–2 (N)		3rd	
2025	Group C	(Germany) Bayern Munich	1–2 (N)		3rd	
2025	Group C	(New Zealand) Auckland City	1–1 (N)		3rd	

== Overall results by opponent and country ==
As of 21 November 2026

Positive record Neutral record Negative record

Friendly matches are not included in the following records.

Clubs faced by Boca Juniors in international and South American competitions
Country	Club	M	W	D	L	GF	GA	GD	W %
CAF
Tunisia	Étoile du Sahel	1	1	0	0	1	0	+1	100.00
Tunisia	Subtotal	1	1	0	0	1	0	+1	100.00
CONCACAF
Mexico	América	5	2	0	3	9	7	+2	40.00
Mexico	Atlas	4	2	1	1	9	5	+4	50.00
Mexico	Cruz Azul	2	1	0	1	1	1	+0	50.00
Mexico	Guadalajara	2	0	1	1	0	4	−4	0.00
Mexico	Pachuca	2	1	0	1	5	3	+2	50.00
Mexico	UNAM	2	0	2	0	2	2	+0	0.00
Mexico	Toluca	4	1	0	3	6	7	−1	25.00
Mexico	Subtotal	21	7	4	10	32	29	+3	33.33
CONMEBOL
Argentina	Argentinos Juniors	2	2	0	0	5	0	+5	100.00
Argentina	Arsenal	4	3	1	0	9	4	+5	75.00
Argentina	Colón	2	1	1	0	3	2	+1	50.00
Argentina	Estudiantes	4	1	0	3	3	7	−4	25.00
Argentina	Gimnasia y Esgrima	2	0	1	1	1	3	−2	0.00
Argentina	Independiente	16	3	8	5	10	13	−3	18.75
Argentina	Newell's Old Boys	2	0	2	0	0	0	+0	0.00
Argentina	Racing	13	5	7	1	12	6	+6	38.46
Argentina	River Plate	32	11	11	10	33	28	+5	34.38
Argentina	Rosario Central	4	2	1	1	6	2	+4	50.00
Argentina	San Lorenzo	4	1	0	3	2	4	−2	25.00
Argentina	Vélez Sarsfield	8	1	2	5	8	11	−3	12.50
Argentina	Subtotal	93	30	34	29	92	80	+12	32.26
Bolivia	Always Ready	2	2	0	0	3	0	+3	100.00
Bolivia	Blooming	2	1	0	1	6	2	+4	50.00
Bolivia	Bolívar	12	6	3	3	22	10	+12	50.00
Bolivia	Jorge Wilstermann	4	1	2	1	6	3	+3	25.00
Bolivia	Nacional Potosí	2	1	1	0	4	0	+4	50.00
Bolivia	Oriente Petrolero	4	2	1	1	3	2	+1	50.00
Bolivia	The Strongest	6	5	0	1	10	3	+7	83.33
Bolivia	Universitario	2	1	1	0	4	0	+4	50.00
Bolivia	Subtotal	34	19	8	7	58	20	+38	55.88
Brazil	Athletico Paranaense	4	3	0	1	5	4	+1	75.00
Brazil	Atlético Mineiro	9	4	4	1	10	6	+4	44.44
Brazil	Corinthians	12	3	7	2	13	11	+2	25.00
Brazil	Cruzeiro	18	7	5	6	18	16	+2	38.89
Brazil	Flamengo	4	3	0	1	9	2	+7	75.00
Brazil	Fluminense	7	2	2	3	9	10	−1	28.57
Brazil	Fortaleza	2	0	1	1	3	5	−2	0.00
Brazil	Gremio	6	4	1	1	8	2	+6	66.67
Brazil	Internacional	8	3	1	4	10	9	+1	37.50
Brazil	Palmeiras	14	2	9	3	17	23	−6	14.29
Brazil	Paysandu	2	1	0	1	4	3	+1	50.00
Brazil	Santos	8	3	1	4	10	10	+0	37.50
Brazil	São Caetano	2	0	2	0	1	1	+0	0.00
Brazil	São Paulo	14	6	4	4	20	14	+6	42.86
Brazil	Vasco da Gama	6	3	2	1	11	5	+6	50.00
Brazil	Subtotal	116	44	39	33	148	122	+26	37.93
Chile	Cobreloa	4	4	0	0	6	2	+4	100.00
Chile	Colo-Colo	12	6	2	4	18	16	+2	50.00
Chile	O'Higgins	2	1	0	1	1	1	+0	50.00
Chile	Palestino	2	2	0	0	4	0	+4	100.00
Chile	Santiago Wanderers	2	0	1	1	0	1	−1	0.00
Chile	Unión Española	2	2	0	0	5	3	+2	100.00
Chile	Universidad Católica	10	7	1	2	18	11	+7	70.00
Chile	Universidad de Chile	4	3	1	0	6	2	+4	75.00
Chile	Subtotal	38	25	5	8	58	36	+22	65.79
Colombia	América de Cali	2	2	0	0	6	0	+6	100.00
Colombia	Atlético Nacional	3	1	0	2	2	5	−3	33.33
Colombia	Cúcuta Deportivo	2	1	0	1	4	3	+1	50.00
Colombia	Deportes Tolima	2	1	1	0	5	2	+3	50.00
Colombia	Deportivo Cali	12	6	4	2	19	10	+9	50.00
Colombia	Deportivo Pereira	2	1	0	1	2	2	+0	50.00
Colombia	Independiente Medellín	4	3	0	1	6	1	+5	75.00
Colombia	Junior	6	3	3	0	13	7	+6	50.00
Colombia	Once Caldas	4	1	2	1	5	4	+1	25.00
Colombia	Subtotal	37	19	10	8	62	34	+28	51.35
Ecuador	Barcelona	8	4	2	2	10	6	+4	50.00
Ecuador	Deportivo Cuenca	4	2	1	1	4	1	+3	50.00
Ecuador	Deportivo Quito	2	2	0	0	6	1	+5	100.00
Ecuador	El Nacional	4	2	2	0	7	3	+4	50.00
Ecuador	Emelec	2	2	0	0	3	1	+2	100.00
Ecuador	Independiente del Valle	4	1	1	2	4	5	−1	25.00
Ecuador	LDU Quito	4	2	2	0	8	1	+7	50.00
Ecuador	Subtotal	28	15	8	5	42	18	+24	53.57
Paraguay	Cerro Porteño	12	6	4	2	24	13	+11	50.00
Paraguay	Deportivo Capiatá	2	1	0	1	1	1	+0	50.00
Paraguay	Guaraní	4	3	1	0	10	4	+6	75.00
Paraguay	Libertad	8	6	2	0	13	3	+10	75.00
Paraguay	Olimpia	13	5	3	5	20	18	+2	38.46
Paraguay	Recoleta	2	2	0	0	7	1	+6	100.00
Paraguay	Sportivo Trinidense	2	2	0	0	3	1	+2	100.00
Paraguay	Subtotal	43	25	10	8	78	41	+37	58.14
Peru	Alianza Lima	6	3	1	2	8	3	+5	50.00
Peru	Cienciano	3	1	1	1	2	4	−2	33.33
Peru	Sporting Cristal	8	5	1	2	17	11	+6	62.50
Peru	Universitario	8	4	1	3	9	4	+5	50.00
Peru	Subtotal	25	13	4	8	36	22	+14	52.00
Uruguay	Defensor Sporting	4	1	2	1	4	3	+1	25.00
Uruguay	Montevideo Wanderers	6	5	0	1	12	5	+7	83.33
Uruguay	Nacional	18	4	8	6	22	26	−4	22.22
Uruguay	Peñarol	16	11	3	2	26	13	+13	68.75
Uruguay	Universal	1	1	0	0	2	0	+2	100.00
Uruguay	Subtotal	45	22	13	10	66	47	+19	48.89
Venezuela	Caracas	2	1	1	0	4	1	+3	50.00
Venezuela	Deportivo Italia	2	2	0	0	7	3	+4	100.00
Venezuela	Deportivo Táchira	2	2	0	0	4	0	+4	100.00
Venezuela	Lara	2	2	0	0	5	1	+4	100.00
Venezuela	Maracaibo	2	1	1	0	4	1	+3	50.00
Venezuela	Monagas	2	1	1	0	4	0	+4	50.00
Venezuela	Zamora	4	3	1	0	12	1	+11	75.00
Venezuela	Subtotal	16	12	4	0	40	7	+33	75.00
OFC
New Zealand	Auckland City	1	0	1	0	1	1	+0	0.00
New Zealand	Subtotal	1	0	1	0	1	1	+0	0.00
UEFA
Germany	Bayern Munich	2	0	0	2	1	3	−2	0.00
Germany	Borussia Mönchengladbach	2	1	1	0	5	2	+3	50.00
Germany	Subtotal	4	1	1	2	6	5	+1	25.00
Italy	Milan	2	0	1	1	3	5	−2	0.00
Italy	Subtotal	2	0	1	1	3	5	−2	0.00
Portugal	Benfica	1	0	1	0	2	2	+0	0.00
Portugal	Subtotal	1	0	1	0	2	2	+0	0.00
Spain	Real Madrid	3	2	0	1	5	5	+0	66.67
Spain	Subtotal	3	2	0	1	5	5	+0	66.67
Total: 96 clubs		508	235	143	130	730	474	+256	46.26

== Personal statistics ==
=== Top scorers ===
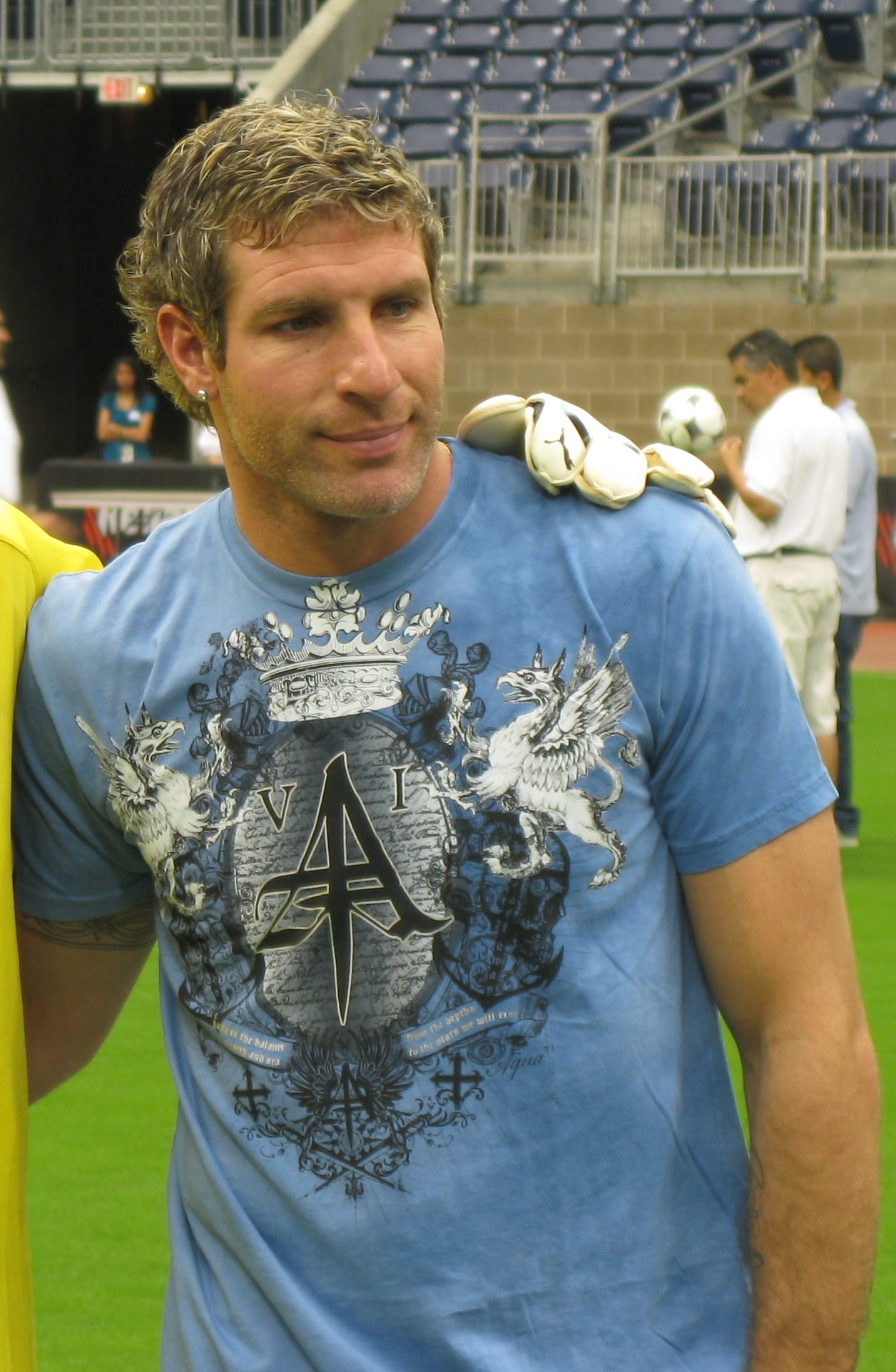
Martín Palermo scored the most goals in international competitions, with 43 goals

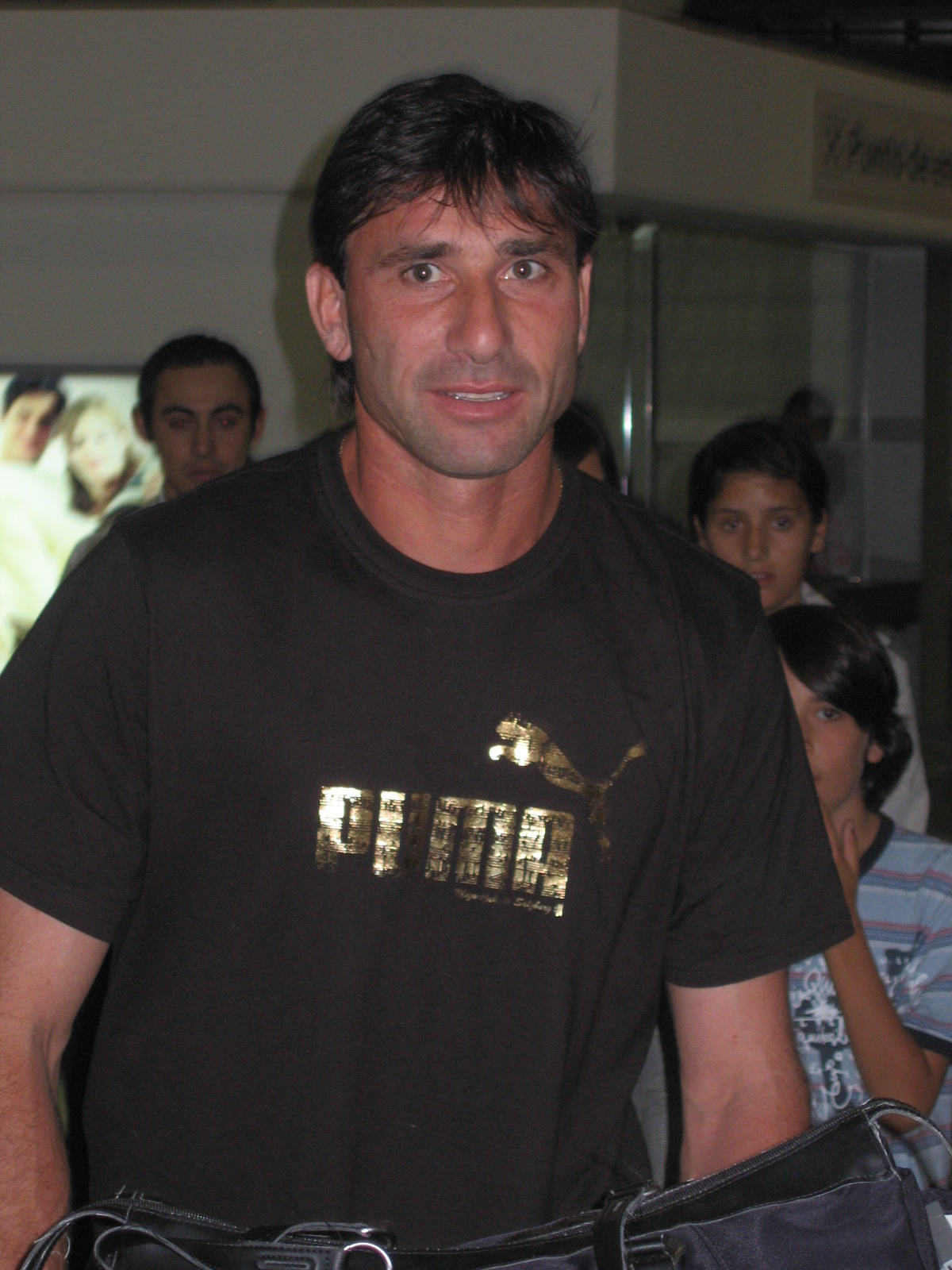
Roberto Abbondanzieri holds the record of appearances with 100 international matches played

Nº	Player	Pos.	Goals	Tenure
1	(Argentina) Martín Palermo	FW	43	1997–2001, 2004–2011
2	(Argentina) Rodrigo Palacio	FW	28	2005–2009
3	(Argentina) Juan Román Riquelme	MF	27	1996–2002, 2007–2014
4	(Argentina) Guillermo Barros Schelotto	FW	24	1997–2007
5	(Argentina) Carlos Tevez	FW	20	2001–2004, 2015–2016, 2018–2021

=== Most appearances ===
Nº	Player	Pos.	Matches	Tenure
1	(Argentina) Roberto Abbondanzieri	GK	100	1996–2006, 2009–2010
2	(Argentina) Juan Román Riquelme	MF	93	1996–2002, 2007–2014
3	(Argentina) Sebastián Battaglia	MF	88	1998–2003, 2005–2013
3	(Argentina) Guillermo Barros Schelotto	FW	88	1997–2007
3	(Argentina) Clemente Rodríguez	DF	88	2000–2004, 2010–2013
