= 1995 Recopa Sudamericana =

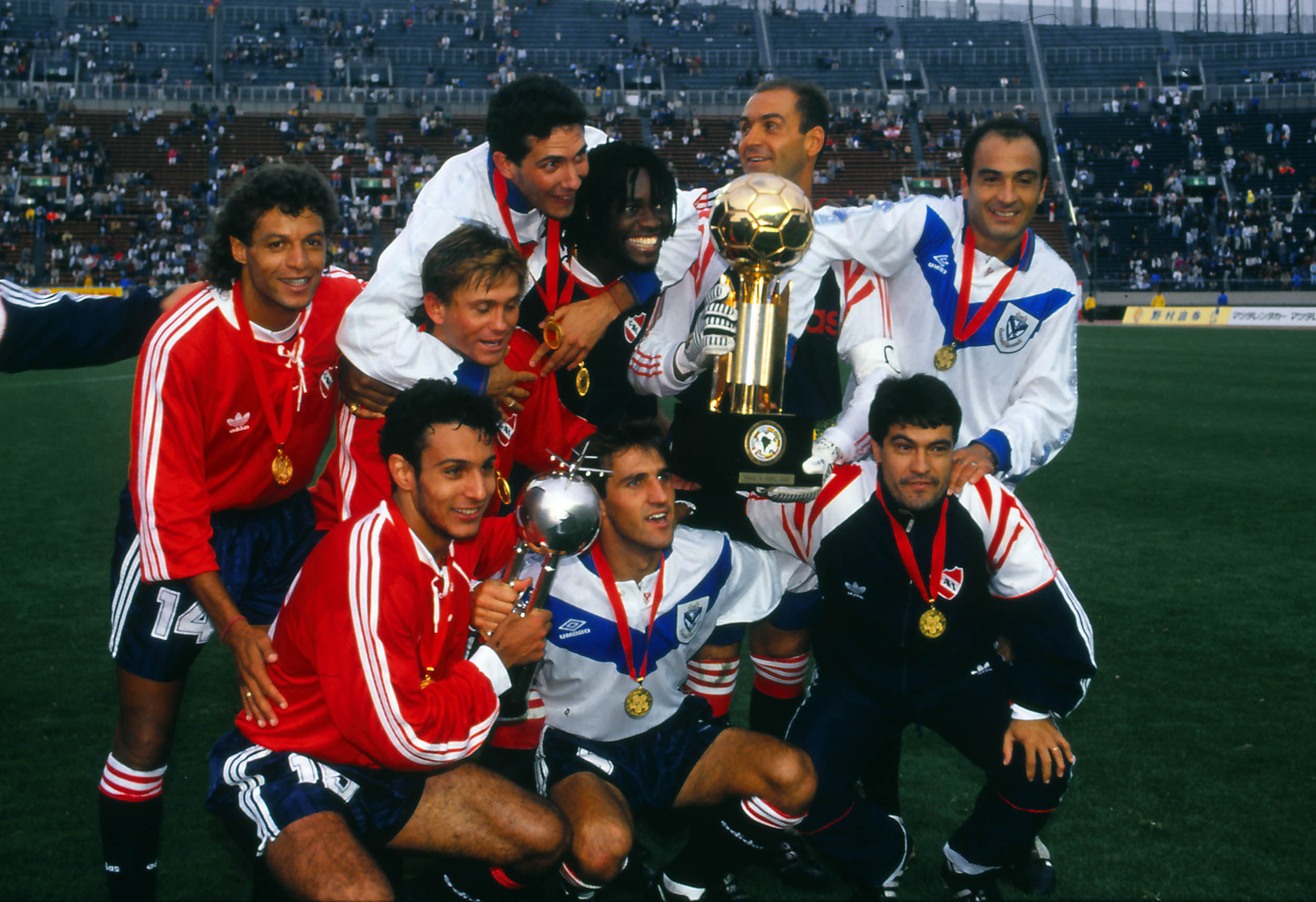
- Independiente of Avellaneda, the Recopa Sudamericana 1995 winner.
- Event: Recopa Sudamericana
Vélez Sársfield	Independiente
(Argentina)	(Argentina)
0	1
- Date: April 9, 1995
- Venue: National Olympic Stadium, Tokyo
- Referee: Juan Escobar (Paraguay)
- Attendance: 25,300

The 1995 Recopa Sudamericana was the seventh Recopa Sudamericana, an annual football match between the winners of the previous season's Copa Libertadores and Supercopa Sudamericana competitions. The all-Argentinian final took place in the neutral venue of the National Olympic Stadium of Tokyo.

The match was contested by Vélez Sársfield, winners of the 1994 Copa Libertadores, and Independiente, winners of the 1994 Supercopa Sudamericana, on April 9, 1995. Independiente surprisingly defeated Carlos Bianchi's Vélez Sársfield 0-1 to lift the trophy for the first time. Paraguayan Juan Escobar Valdez became the first referee to direct two consecutive finals and three, in total, of the competition.

== Qualified teams ==
Team	Previous finals app.
(Argentina) Vélez Sársfield	None
(Argentina) Independiente	None

Bold indicates winning years

== Match details ==
1995 Recopa Sudamericana
April 9, 1995

Independiente (Argentina)	1–0	(Argentina) Vélez Sársfield
Serrizuela 69'	Report

National Olympic Stadium, Tokyo
Referee: Juan Escobar (Paraguay)

**Independiente**	**Vélez Sársfield**

GK	(Argentina) Luis Islas
DF	(Argentina) Juan Carlos Ramírez
DF	(Argentina) Claudio Arzeno
DF	(Argentina) José Serrizuela
DF	(Argentina) Guillermo Ríos
MF	(Argentina) Diego Cagna
MF	(Argentina) Raúl Alfredo Cascini
MF	(Argentina) Daniel Garnero	(substituted off) 62'
FW	(Argentina) Jorge Burruchaga	(substituted off) 46'
FW	(Colombia) Albeiro Usuriaga	(substituted off) 77'
FW	(Argentina) Sebastián Rambert
Substitutes:
MF	(Argentina) Pablo Rotchen	(substituted on) 46'
MF	(Argentina) Gustavo López	(substituted on) 62'
MF	(Uruguay) Tony Gómez	(substituted on) 77'
Manager:
(Argentina) Miguel Ángel Brindisi

GK	(Paraguay) José Luis Chilavert
DF	(Argentina) Roberto Trotta
DF	(Argentina) Víctor Sotomayor
DF	(Argentina) Flavio Zandoná
DF	(Argentina) Raúl Cardozo	(substituted off) 73a'
MF	(Argentina) José Basualdo
MF	(Argentina) Marcelo Herrera
MF	(Argentina) Claudio Husaín	(substituted off) 85'
MF	(Argentina) Christian Bassedas	(substituted off) 73b'
FW	(Argentina) Omar Asad
FW	(Argentina) José Oscar Flores
Substitutes:
MF	(Argentina) Roberto Pompei	(substituted on) 73a'
FW	(Chile) José Luis Sánchez	(substituted on) 73b'
DF	(Argentina) Mauricio Pellegrino	(substituted on) 85'
Manager:
(Argentina) Carlos Bianchi
