= Eloy Pereira =

Argentine professional footballer

Personal information
- Full name: Eloy Maximiliano Pereira
- Date of birth: 4 March 1993 (age 33)
- Place of birth: Lanús, Argentina
- Height: 1.80 m (5 ft 11 in)
- Position: Centre-back

Youth career
- Belgrano de Lanús
- Lanús
- Talleres
- Banfield
- Talleres

Senior career*
Years	Team	Apps	(Gls)
2014–2018	Talleres	85	(1)
2018–2019	Deportivo Español	9	(0)
- * Club domestic league appearances and goals

Eloy Maximiliano Pereira (born 4 March 1993) is an Argentine professional footballer who plays as a centre-back.

== Club career ==
Pereira began in the youth ranks of Belgrano de Lanús. He then moved to Lanús' academy, prior to signing for Talleres' system; he subsequently left to join Banfield, but returned to Talleres soon after. His senior career got underway in 2014. Thirty-one appearances followed in two seasons in Primera C Metropolitana, with Talleres winning promotion in 2015. His first appearance in Primera B Metropolitana followed on 5 February 2016 versus Platense, with his first goal then coming in the succeeding May against Villa San Carlos. A total of eighty-five appearances came across five campaigns, fourteen of which arrived in 2017–18.

On 17 August 2018, Pereira moved to fellow third tier team Deportivo Español. He made his debut on 20 August in a loss to ex-club Talleres. He appeared eight more times in 2018–19 as they were relegated, with the centre-back being released soon after.

== International career ==
Pereira previously received a call-up to train with Walter Perazzo's Argentina U20s.

== Career statistics ==
As of 11 July 2020.

Appearances and goals by club, season and competition
Club	Season	League			Cup		League Cup		Continental		Other		Total	
Club	Season	Division	Apps	Goals	Apps	Goals	Apps	Goals	Apps	Goals	Apps	Goals	Apps	Goals
Talleres	2016	Primera B Metropolitana	17	1	0	0	—		—		0	0	17	1
Talleres	2016–17	Primera B Metropolitana	23	0	0	0	—		—		0	0	23	0
Talleres	2017–18	Primera B Metropolitana	14	0	0	0	—		—		0	0	14	0
Talleres	Total		54	1	0	0	—		—		0	0	54	1
Deportivo Español	2018–19	Primera B Metropolitana	9	0	0	0	—		—		0	0	9	0
Career total			63	1	0	0	—		—		0	0	63	1
