= Ricardo Giusti =

Argentine footballer

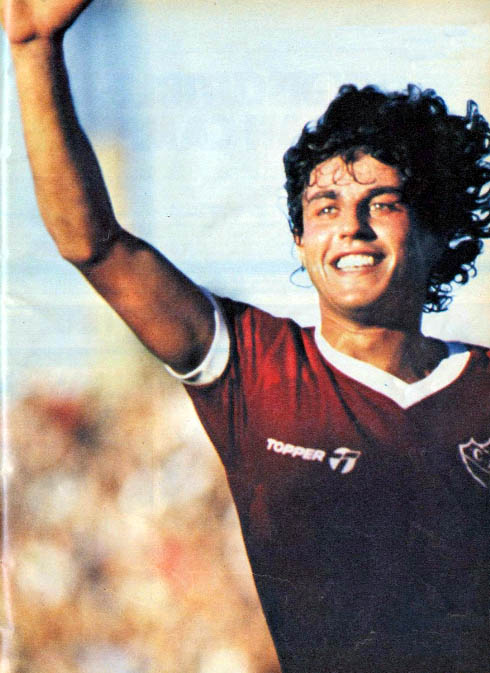
- Giusti playing for Independiente in 1983

Personal information
- Full name: Ricardo Omar Giusti
- Date of birth: 11 December 1956 (age 69)
- Place of birth: Albarellos, Argentina
- Height: 1.78 m (5 ft 10 in)
- Position: Defensive midfielder

Senior career*
Years	Team	Apps	(Gls)
1975–1978	Newell's Old Boys	108	(10)
1979–1980	Argentinos Juniors	32	(2)
1980–1991	Independiente	295	(34)
1991–1992	Unión de Santa Fe	31	(3)
Total		466	(49)

International career
1983–1990	Argentina	53	(0)
Medal record
Men's football
Representing Argentina
FIFA World Cup
Winner	1986 Mexico
Runner-up	1990 Italy
Copa América
Third place	1989 Brazil
- * Club domestic league appearances and goals

Ricardo Omar Giusti (born 11 December 1956) is an Argentine former footballer. A midfielder, he played most of his career with Argentine side Independiente. At international level, he won the FIFA World Cup with Argentina in 1986 and was also a member of the runner-up national squad in the 1990 edition of the tournament. With 53 caps between 1983 and 1990, Giusti is currently 38th in the appearance records for the Argentina national football team. He played a part in five major tournaments for his nation.

== Club career ==
During his career, Giusti played for Unión de Santa Fe, Argentinos Juniors and Newell's Old Boys, but he had most of his success with Independiente where he captained the team in their most successful era, and was part of the sides that won the Primera Division Argentina titles in the 1983 Metropolitano Championship and during the 1988–89 season. He was named as the club's best midfielder during Independiente's 90th anniversary.

For much of his Independiente career, Giusti was partnered in midfield with Claudio Marangoni and Ricardo Bochini, which was widely considered to be one of the best midfields in Argentina in its time.

== International career ==
At international level, Giusti played a part in five major tournaments for Argentina. He won the FIFA World Cup with Argentina in 1986, where he played in every game for the eventual champions. He also played in the 1990 FIFA World Cup where, after missing the first two group matches, he went on to figure in every game up till the semi-finals, where Argentina knocked out the hosts Italy. Giusti was sent off in that match after a second bookable offence where he elbowed Italian forward Roberto Baggio. Argentina were defeated 1–0 by West Germany in the final of the competition.

== Career statistics ==
Appearances and goals by national team and year
National team	Year	Apps	Goals
Argentina	1983	3	0
Argentina	1984	11	0
Argentina	1985	8	0
Argentina	1986	10	0
Argentina	1987	5	0
Argentina	1988	6	0
Argentina	1989	3	0
Argentina	1990	7	0
Total		53	0

== Honours ==
Argentinos Juniors

- Argentine Primera División runner-up: 1980 metropolitano

Independiente

- Argentine Primera División: Metropolitano 1983, 1988–89
- Copa Libertadores: 1984
- Intercontinental Cup: 1984
- Supercopa Libertadores runner-up: 1989

Argentina

- FIFA World Cup: 1986; runner-up: 1990

Individual

- South American Team of the Year: 1987
