= Juan Simón =

Argentine footballer

Personal information
- Full name: Juan Ernesto Simón
- Date of birth: 2 March 1960 (age 66)
- Place of birth: Rosario, Argentina
- Height: 1.80 m (5 ft 11 in)
- Position: Sweeper

Senior career*
| Years | Team | Apps | (Gls) |
| 1977–1983 | Newell's Old Boys | 211 | (1) |
| 1983–1986 | Monaco | 73 | (0) |
| 1986–1988 | Strasbourg | 17 | (0) |
| 1988–1994 | Boca Juniors | 168 | (0) |
| Total | | 479 | (1) |

International career
| 1979 | Argentina U-20 | 11 | (1) |
| 1980–1990 | Argentina | 13 | (0) |
Medal record
Men's football
Representing Argentina
FIFA U-20 World Cup
| Winner | 1979 Japan |
FIFA World Cup
| Runner-up | 1990 Italy |
- * Club domestic league appearances and goals as of September 2007

Juan Ernesto Simón (born 2 March 1960) is an Argentine former footballer who played as a defender.

== Career ==
=== Early years ===
Born in Rosario, Santa Fe Province, Simón started his career with Newell's Old Boys in 1977, at age 9. In 1979, he was part of the Argentina national under-20 football team that won the FIFA U-20 World Cup. He received his first call up to the full Argentina team in 1980.

=== France ===
Simón moved to France in 1983 to play for Monaco, in 1986 he joined Strasbourg where he played until 1988.

=== Return to Argentina ===
In 1988 Simón returned to Argentina joining Boca Juniors, he won several titles with the club including their first official league title for eleven years in 1992. He was a key part of their defence during the late 80's and early 90s. In 1990, he was part of the Argentina squad that reached the World Cup final. He retired in 1994.

== Honours ==
Monaco

- Ligue 1 runner-up: 1983-84
- Coupe de France: 1984–85
- Trophée des Champions: 1985

Boca Juniors

- Primera División: 1992 Apertura
- Supercopa Libertadores: 1989
- Recopa Sudamericana: 1990
- Copa Master: 1992
- Copa de Oro: 1993
- Copa Iberoamericana runner-up: 1994

Argentina

- FIFA World Youth Championship: 1979
- FIFA World Cup runner-up: 1990

=== Individual ===
- South American Team of the Year: 1989, 1990
