= Walter Perazzo =

Colombian-born Argentine footballer (born 1962)

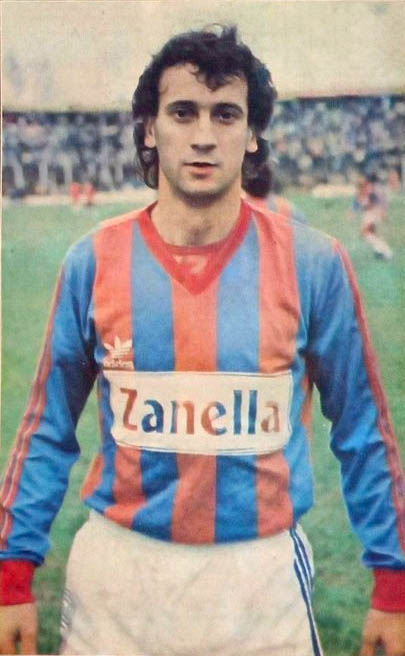
- Perazzo in 1986

Personal information
- Full name: Walter Osvaldo Perazzo Otero
- Date of birth: 2 August 1962 (age 64)
- Place of birth: Bogotá, Colombia
- Height: 1.76 m (5 ft 9 in)
- Position: Centre forward

Team information
- Current team: San Lorenzo (youth coordinator)

Senior career*
| Years | Team | Apps | (Gls) |
| 1979–1988 | San Lorenzo | 240 | (77) |
| 1982 | → Estudiantes LP (loan) | | |
| 1983 | → Santa Fe (loan) | | |
| 1988–1990 | Boca Juniors | 56 | (12) |
| 1990 | Argentinos Juniors | 8 | (1) |
| 1991 | Deportivo Cali | | |
| 1992 | Bolívar | | |
| 1994 | Daewoo Royals | 2 | (0) |

International career
| 1987 | Argentina U23 | | |

Managerial career
- 2010–2011: Argentina U20
- 2011–2012: Argentina U22
- 2012–2015: Olimpo
- 2015–2016: Ferro Carril Oeste
- 2017: Aldosivi
- 2018–2019: Nueva Chicago
- 2019–2021: Temperley
- 2021–2022: Almagro
- 2022–2023: Güemes
- 2024: Patronato
- 2024: Temperley
- 2025: Nueva Chicago
- 2026: San Lorenzo (interim)
- * Club domestic league appearances and goals

Walter Osvaldo Perazzo Otero (born 2 August 1962) is a Colombian-born Argentine football manager and former player who played as a centre forward. He is the current youth coordinator of San Lorenzo.

== Biography ==
Perazzo was born in Bogotá, Colombia while his father Alberto was a football player for local club Independiente Santa Fe. Both of his parents are Argentine.

He started his career in 1979 in San Lorenzo, where he debuted in Primera División on November 18, with only 17 years old, after replacing Miguel Gette. San Lorenzo beat Club Cipolletti 4–0 at Estadio Gasómetro. His first goal in Primera was scored v Ferro Carril Oeste on February 24, 1980. He played in San Lorenzo until 1982 when he was traded on loan to Estudiantes de La Plata due to then coach Juan Carlos Lorenzo did not have him into account. Perazzo was part of the team that won the 1982 Metropolitano coached by Carlos Bilardo. One year later, he emigrated to Colombia to play for Independiente Santa Fe

At the end of 1983, Perazzo returned to San Lorenzo where he reached its peak, scoring 77 goals in 240 matches that helped him become an idol for its supporters. He stayed in Boedo until 1988, when he was transferred to Boca Juniors for US$200,000. Perazzo played two seasons (1988–90) for Boca Juniors but the great expectations were not fulfilled, scoring 12 goals in 56 matches.

In 1991, he moved to Argentinos Juniors where he only scored one goal in 8 matches. That same year Perazzo returned to Colombia to play in Deportivo Cali (1991), then moving to Club Bolívar (1992–93). In 1994, Perazzo debuted in South Korean K League playing for Daewoo Royals. He then played for Canadian team Montreal Supra before retiring from football.

After retiring, Perazzo became manager, coaching the Argentina U20 in 2010–11.

== Titles ==
Estudiantes LP

- Argentine Primera División (1): 1982 Metropolitano

Boca Juniors

- Supercopa Libertadores (1): 1989
- Recopa Sudamericana (1): 1990

Bolívar

- Liga Profesional (1): 1992

Argentina Youth

- South American Games: 1986
