= Carlos Aimar =

Argentine retired footballer

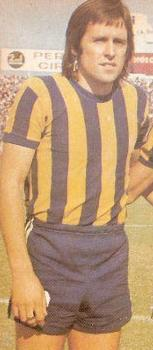

Personal information
- Full name: Carlos Daniel Aimar
- Date of birth: 21 July 1950 (age 76)
- Place of birth: Corral de Bustos, Argentina
- Position: Midfielder

Senior career*
Years	Team	Apps	(Gls)
1970–1971	Sporting Club		
1971–1978	Rosario Central	310	(32)
1979	San Lorenzo	8	(0)
Total		318	(32)

Managerial career
- 1988–1989: Deportivo Español
- 1989: Logroñés
- 1989–1990: Boca Juniors
- 1991–1992: Rosario Central
- 1992–1994: Logroñés
- 1994–1995: Celta
- 1996: San Lorenzo
- 1997: Logroñés
- 1999: Tenerife
- 2001–2002: Lanús
- 2003–2004: Leganés
- 2005: Quilmes
- * Club domestic league appearances and goals

Carlos Daniel Aimar (born 21 July 1950) is an Argentine retired footballer who played as a midfielder, and a current coach.

== Playing career ==
Born in Corral de Bustos, Marcos Juárez, Córdoba, Aimar started his senior career with hometown's Sporting Club. In 1971, after impressing in a friendly, he moved to Rosario Central.

On 16 May 1971 Aimar made his Primera División debut, in a defeat against Estudiantes de La Plata. After making his debut, he was regularly used by the club, being a part of the squad in its 1971 and 1973 league-winning campaigns.

Aimar also appeared with Rosario in three Copa Libertadores editions, and ended his spell at the club in 1978 with a total of 334 matches and 32 goals. In 1979, he joined fellow league team San Lorenzo de Almagro, and eventually retired with the club in the end of the year, aged 28.

== Managerial career ==
Aimar's first managerial experience was at Deportivo Español in 1988. The following year he moved abroad, being appointed manager of CD Logroñés in La Liga.

After a one-year spell at Boca Juniors, Aimar returned to his lifetime club Rosario Central in 1991. He subsequently returned to Logroñés, avoiding relegation during his two campaigns in charge.

In 1994 Aimar was appointed at the helm of Celta de Vigo, also in the top division. He was sacked in October 1995, and was later named manager of another club he represented as a player, San Lorenzo.

In 1997 Aimar returned to Logroñés for a third spell, but failed to avoid its top flight relegation. He was subsequently in charge of CD Tenerife, Club Atlético Lanús, CD Leganés and Quilmes Atlético Club before retiring from football and becoming a sports commentator.

== Honours ==
=== Player ===
Rosario Central

- Primera División: 1971, 1973

=== Manager ===
Boca Juniors

- Supercopa Libertadores: 1989
- Recopa Sudamericana: 1990
