= Luis Islas =

Argentine footballer and manager

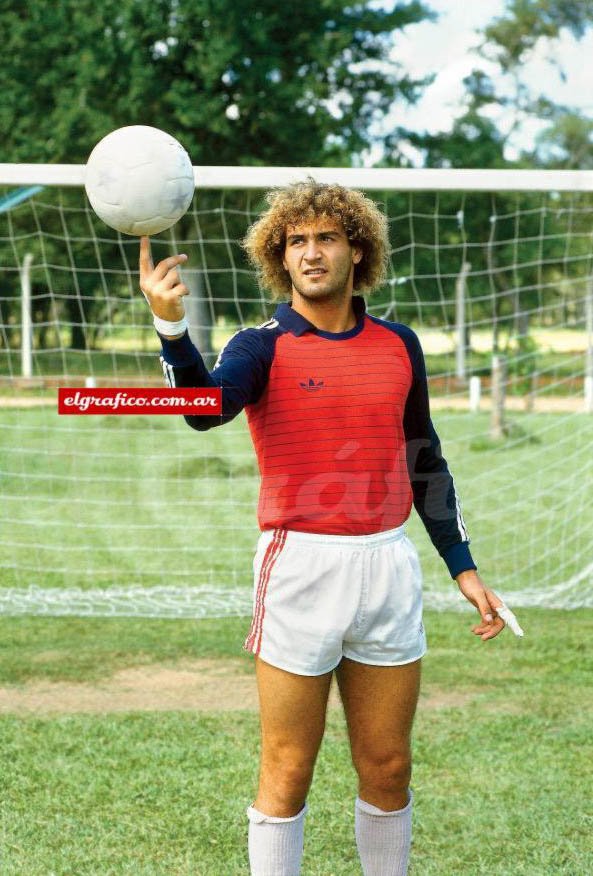
- Islas while playing for Estudiantes de La Plata in 1983

Personal information
- Full name: Luis Alberto Islas Ranieri
- Date of birth: 22 December 1965 (age 60)
- Place of birth: Buenos Aires, Argentina
- Height: 1.89 m (6 ft 2 in)
- Position: Goalkeeper

Senior career*
Years	Team	Apps	(Gls)
1982	Chacarita Juniors	21	(0)
1983–1986	Estudiantes	107	(0)
1986–1988	Independiente	48	(0)
1988–1990	Atlético Madrid	0	(0)
1989–1990	→ Logroñés (loan)	35	(0)
1990–1994	Independiente	141	(0)
1995	Newell's Old Boys	15	(0)
1996	Platense	10	(0)
1996–1997	Toluca	53	(0)
1998–1999	Huracán	19	(0)
2000	Tigre	12	(0)
2000–2001	León	44	(0)
2002–2003	Talleres	34	(0)
2003	Independiente	8	(0)
Total		547	(0)

International career
1983	Argentina U20	6	(0)
1984–1994	Argentina	30	(0)

Managerial career
- 2006: Aurora
- 2007: Almagro
- 2007: Aurora
- 2011: Central Norte
- 2013: Racing de Córdoba
- 2014: Colegiales
- 2015–2016: Deportivo Español
- 2020: Sol de América
- 2021: Sol de Mayo
- 2022: Sportivo Desamparados
- 2023: Sacachispas
- 2025: Ayacucho
Medal record
Men's football
Representing Argentina
FIFA World Cup
Winner	1986 Mexico
Copa América
Winner	1993 Ecuador
FIFA Confederations Cup
Winner	1992 Saudi Arabia
CONMEBOL–UEFA Cup of Champions
Winner	1993 Argentina
- * Club domestic league appearances and goals

Luis Alberto Islas Ranieri (born 22 December 1965 in Buenos Aires, Argentina) is an Argentine football manager and former player.

A goalkeeper who won the FIFA World Cup with Argentina in 1986, Islas played for the Argentina national team, Independiente, Estudiantes de La Plata and León.

== Playing career ==
=== Club ===
Islas started his career as a goalkeeper in Chacarita Juniors in the early 1980s. He earned his nickname el loco ("crazy") because of his flair and temperament.

In late 1982 Islas was transferred to Estudiantes. There, he alternated with Carlos Bertero in the team that won the Nacional championship title in 1983.

He was transferred to Independiente in 1986 and played for two years. He then went to Atlético Madrid in 1988 but did not play a game and was loaned to CD Logroñés. He came back to Independiente in 1990 and helped the team win the Clausura 1994 and two international titles.

He retired in 2003 after playing 241 games for Independiente.

=== International ===
Islas was part of Argentina's Youth Football Team that finished runner-up at the 1983 FIFA World Youth Championship.

Islas was the substitute goalkeeper during the 1986 World Cup, which Argentina won. Angry that he was still a substitute for Nery Pumpido, he resigned the national team just before the 1990 World Cup. Pumpido was injured in the second match during that cup, so third goalkeeper Sergio Goycochea was put to the fore, and was selected the best goalkeeper of the tournament. After the cup, Islas returned to the national team under new coach Alfio Basile. Because Goycochea had some weak matches during the qualifiers to the 1994 World Cup, Islas was the starting goalkeeper for Argentina during the 1994 World Cup.

== Managerial career ==
After a stint in Bolivia, Islas managed Argentine side Club Almagro from November 2006 to May 2007, after which Islas returned to Bolivia to manage Aurora but resigned in September 2007.

== Career statistics ==
Argentina national team
Year	Apps	Goals
1984	3	0
1985	2	0
1986	1	0
1987	5	0
1988	4	0
1989	4	0
1990	0	0
1991	0	0
1992	3	0
1993	1	0
1994	7	0
Total	30	0

== Honours ==
Estudiantes

- Argentine Primera División: Nacional 1983

Independiente

- Argentine Primera División: Clausura 1994
- Supercopa Sudamericana: 1994
- Recopa Sudamericana: 1995

Argentina

- FIFA World Cup: 1986
- Copa América: 1993
- FIFA Confederations Cup: 1992
- CONMEBOL–UEFA Cup of Champions: 1993

Individual

- FIFA World Youth Championship: Bronze ball 1983
- Olimpia Award: 1992
