= Diego Latorre =

Argentine footballer

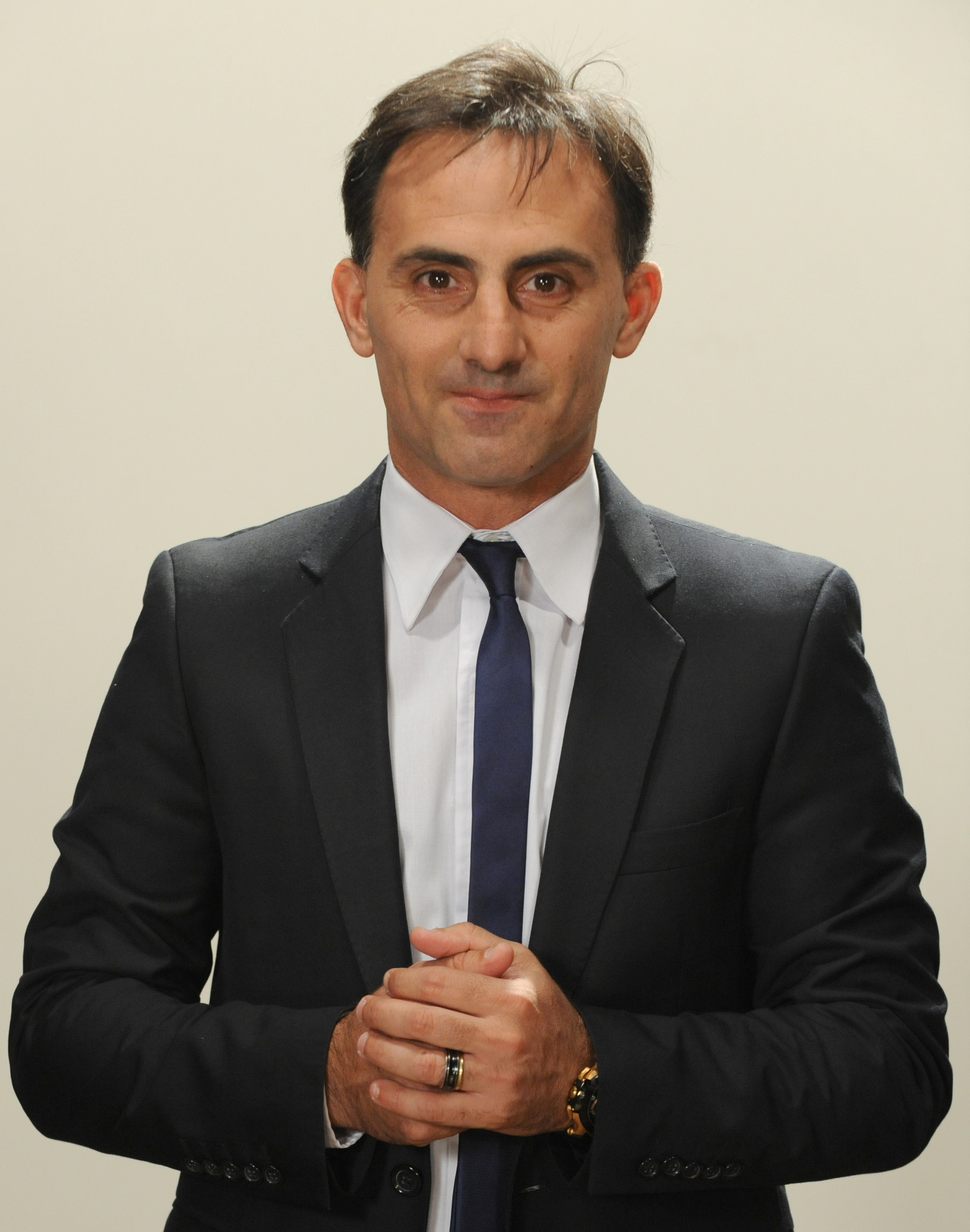
- Latorre in 2015

Personal information
- Full name: Diego Fernando Latorre
- Date of birth: 4 August 1969 (age 57)
- Place of birth: Buenos Aires, Argentina
- Height: 1.70 m (5 ft 7 in)
- Positions: Striker; midfielder

Senior career*
Years	Team	Apps	(Gls)
1987–1992	Boca Juniors	119	(52)
1992–1993	Fiorentina	2	(0)
1993–1995	Tenerife	69	(15)
1995–1996	Salamanca	22	(1)
1996–1998	Boca Juniors	67	(23)
1998–1999	Racing Club	29	(10)
1999–2000	Cruz Azul	18	(6)
2000	Rosario Central	14	(2)
2000–2001	Chacarita Juniors	9	(1)
2001–2003	Club Celaya	68	(27)
2003	Comunicaciones	30	(16)
2003–2004	Dorados de Sinaloa	10	(7)
2004–2005	Comunicaciones	15	(5)
2005–2006	Alacranes de Durango	13	(0)

International career
1991	Argentina	6	(1)
Medal record
Men's Football
Representing Argentina
Copa América
Winner	1991 Chile
- * Club domestic league appearances and goals

Diego Fernando Latorre (born 4 August 1969) is an Argentine former professional footballer who played as a striker or as an offensive midfielder. He is married to Yanina Latorre.

== Career ==
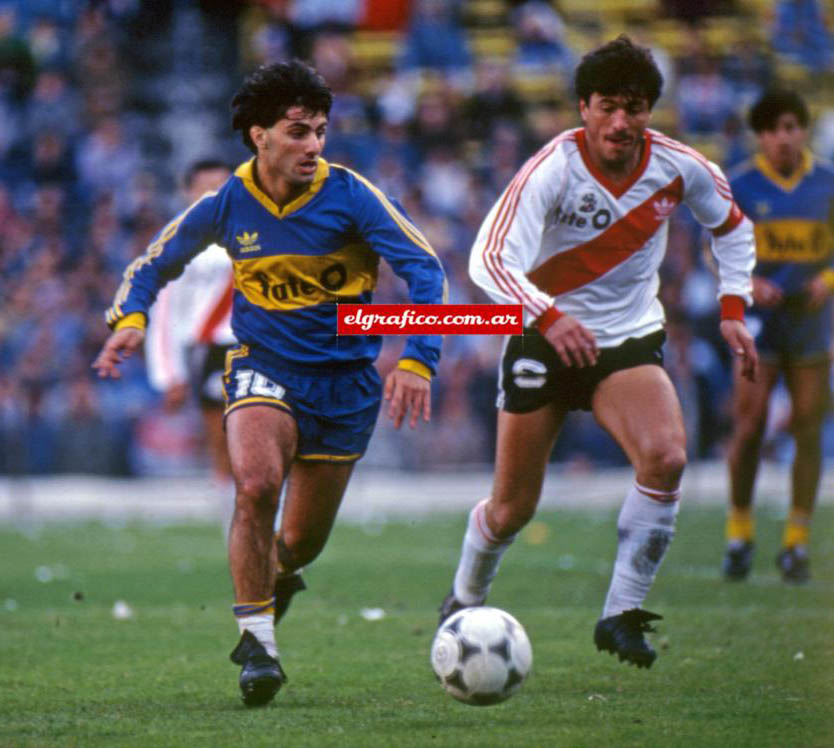
Latorre being marked by Daniel Passarella in a 1988 Superclásico

Latorre was born in Buenos Aires. He made his professional debut for Boca Juniors on 18 October 1987 against Platense scoring his first goal at the same match. He won the 1991 Argentine league with Boca Juniors. His good performance took him to play with the Argentina national football team scoring his first goal in a Copa America match against Peru.

In 1992, he joined Fiorentina with Gabriel Batistuta after the pair helped Argentina to win the Copa America in 1991. While Batistuta eventually became one of Fiorentina's all-time greats, Latorre only made two appearances with the club, and quickly left for Tenerife in La Liga. He made 67 appearances 15 goals with the Spanish club. He moved to Salamanca in 1995, but only spent a single season there. He returned to Boca Juniors in 1996. He also played for Racing Club de Avellaneda and Rosario Central after returning from Europe. He later played in Mexico and Guatemala before retiring in 2005.

== After retirement ==
Latorre joined Fox Sports Latin America as a sportscaster, and has worked alongside Juan Manuel "Bambino" Pons, Mariano Closs and Sebastián "El Pollo" Vignolo as a football match analyst (co-commentator) for Fox Sports Latin America (South Cone).

After Disney acquired Fox Sports Latin America (South Cone) and integrated its operation with Disney-owned ESPN Sur in 2020, Latorre, along with many other Fox Sports Latin America (South Cone) talent including Closs, Pons and Vignolo, moved to ESPN Sur, where he is currently the #1 football match analyst (co-commentator) for the men's Argentine Liga Profesional del Fútbol, the men's CONMEBOL Libertadores and the men's UEFA Champions League.

== Career statistics ==
=== International ===
Appearances and goals by national team and year
National team	Year	Apps	Goals
Argentina	1991	6	1
Total		6	1

Scores and results list Argentina's goal tally first, score column indicates score after each Latorre goal.

List of international goals scored by Passang Tshering
No.	Date	Venue	Opponent	Score	Result	Competition
1	14 July 1991	Estadio Nacional, Santiago, Chile	Peru	1–0	3–2	1991 Copa América

== Honours ==
Boca Juniors

- Supercopa Libertadores: 1989
- Recopa Sudamericana: 1990
- Argentine Primera División Torneo Apertura: 1992
- Copa Master de Supercopa: 1992

Comunicaciones

- Liga Nacional de Fútbol de Guatemala: 2003 Clausura

Dorados de Sinaloa

- Ascenso MX: 2003 Apertura

Argentina

- Copa América: 1991

Individual

- Argentine Primera División Top-scorer: 1992
