= Blas Giunta =

Argentine footballer and manager

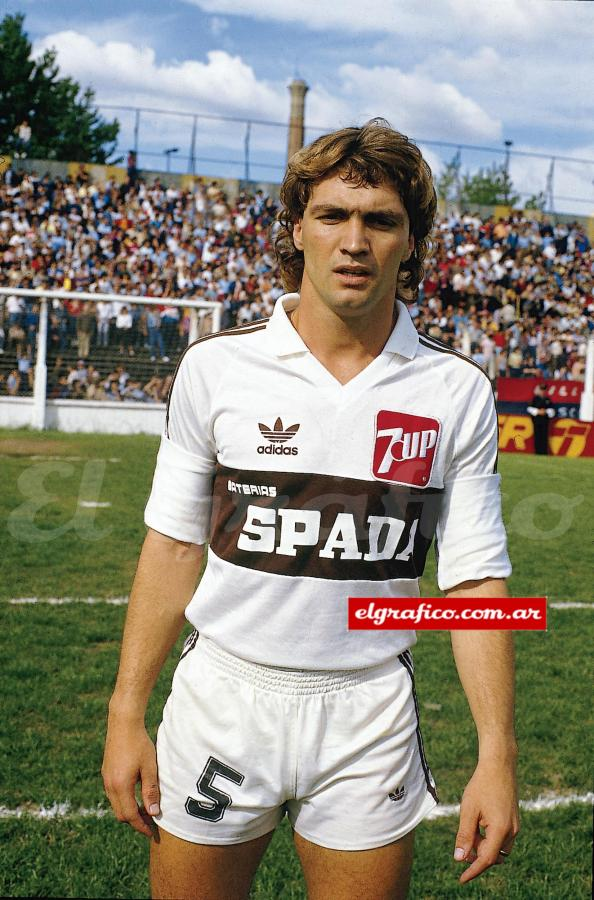
- Giunta in Platense, c. 1985

Personal information
- Full name: Blas Armando Giunta Rodríguez
- Date of birth: 6 September 1963 (age 63)
- Place of birth: Buenos Aires, Argentina
- Position: Midfielder

Team information
- Current team: Boca Juniors (youth coach)

Senior career*
Years	Team	Apps	(Gls)
1983–1984	San Lorenzo	34	(2)
1984–1985	Cipolletti	0	(0)
1985–1986	Platense	27	(2)
1986–1988	San Lorenzo	75	(4)
1988–1989	Murcia	13	(0)
1989–1993	Boca Juniors	142	(8)
1993–1995	Toluca	65	(0)
1995–1997	Boca Juniors	21	(0)
1997	Ourense	1	(0)
1997–1998	Defensores de Belgrano	37	(2)

International career
1987–1991	Argentina	7	(0)

Managerial career
- 1999–2000: San Miguel
- 2003–2004: Estudiantes BA
- 2004–2005: Deportivo Morón
- 2005–2013: Almirante Brown
- 2013–2014: Quilmes
- 2014–2015: Deportivo Morón
- 2016–2017: Acassuso
- 2017: Barracas Central
- 2018–2019: Almirante Brown
- 2020–: Boca Juniors (youth)
Medal record
Representing Argentina
Copa América
Winner	1991 Chile	Team
- * Club domestic league appearances and goals

Blas Armando Giunta Rodríguez (born 6 September 1963, in Buenos Aires) is an Argentine former footballer who played as a midfielder and current youth coach at Boca Juniors.

== Career ==
Giunta started his playing career at Club Atlético San Lorenzo de Almagro where he played from 1983 through 1984 and then from 1986 to the end of 1988, there he took part in the famous Los Camboyanos ("The Cambodians") team. He ended his career as a player in 1999 playing for Defensores de Belgrano, playing in between in teams as Cipolleti de Río Negro (1984–1985), Platense (1985–1986), Murcia (España)(1988–1989), Boca Juniors (1989–1993), Toluca (México)(1993–1995), Ourense (España) (1997–1998). He is mostly remembered for his tenacious approach to football and the song Giunta, Giunta, Giunta, huevo, huevo, huevo sung in the stadiums.

He played almost 200 matches with Boca Juniors, and won the Supercopa Sudamericana 1989, Recopa Sudamericana 1990, Copa Masters 1992, and Apertura Championship 1992.

He won the Copa América in 1991 with Argentina's national team.

== Honours ==
=== Player ===
Boca Juniors

- Primera División: 1992 Apertura
- Supercopa Libertadores: 1989
- Recopa Sudamericana: 1990
- Copa Master: 1992

Argentina Youth

- South American Games: 1986

Argentina

- Copa América: 1991

=== Manager ===
Almirante Brown

- Primera B Metropolitana: 2006–07, 2009–10
