= Víctor Marchesini (footballer) =

Argentine footballer and manager

Personal information
- Full name: Víctor Hugo Marchesini
- Date of birth: 3 November 1960 (age 65)
- Place of birth: Gualeguaychú, Argentina
- Height: 1.81 m (5 ft 11 in)
- Position: Centre back

Senior career*
Years	Team	Apps	(Gls)
1981–1988	Ferro Carril Oeste		
1989–1992	Boca Juniors	81	(2)
1992–1993	The Strongest		
1993–1995	Ferro Carril Oeste		

Managerial career
- 2003–2004: Leganés (assistant)
- 2004: Leganés
- 2005: Quilmes (assistant)
- 2007: Olmedo
- 2008: Universidad Católica (ECU)
- 2009–2010: Macará
- 2010–2011: Juventud Unida
- 2011: Unión San Felipe
- 2012–2019: Boca Juniors (youth)
- 2023: Cerro Porteño (assistant)
- * Club domestic league appearances and goals

Víctor Hugo Marchesini (born 3 November 1960 in Gualeguaychú, Entre Ríos) is an Argentine football manager and former player who played as a centre back.

== Career ==
Marchesini played for Boca Juniors and Ferro Carril Oeste in Argentina and The Strongest in Bolivia.

== Honours ==
Ferro Carril Oeste

- Argentine Primera División: 1984 (Torneo Nacional)

Boca Juniors

- Supercopa Libertadores: 1989
- Recopa Sudamericana: 1990
- Copa Master de Supercopa: 1992
- Argentine Primera División: 1992 Apertura

Argentina Youth

- South American Games: 1986
