= 1990 Recopa Sudamericana =

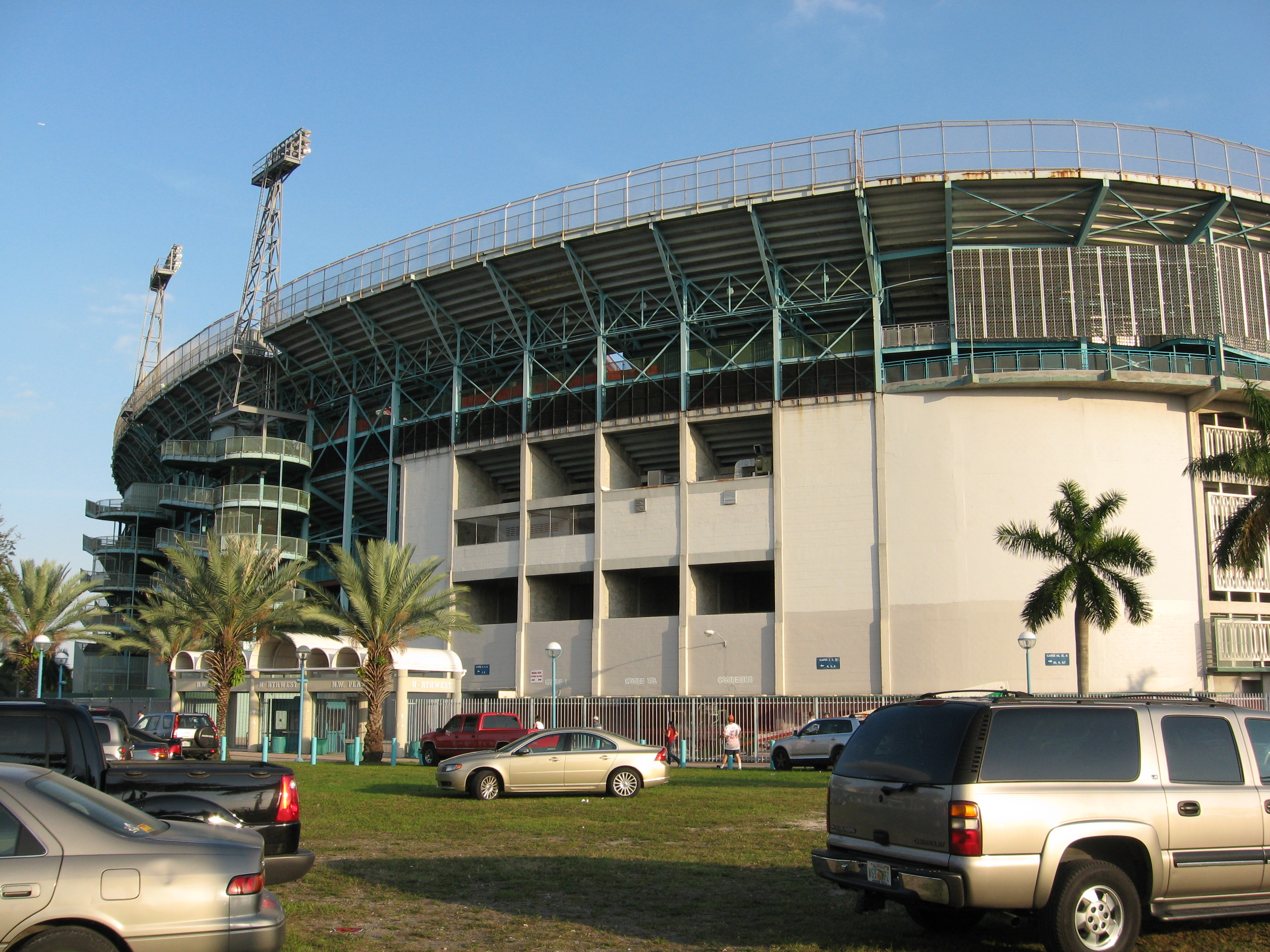
- Miami Orange Bowl, venue
- Event: Recopa Sudamericana
Atlético Nacional	Boca Juniors
(Colombia)	(Argentina)
0	1
- Date: March 17, 1990
- Venue: Orange Bowl, Miami, United States
- Referee: José Roberto Wright (Brazil)
- Attendance: 9,000

The 1990 Recopa Sudamericana was the second Recopa Sudamericana, an annual football match between the winners of the previous season's Copa Libertadores and Supercopa Sudamericana competitions. Originally, the title was supposed to be disputed on a two-legged series. Due to security concerns on the eventual, first leg in Colombia and schedule congestion; a neutral stadium was chosen for the match to take place. The Orange Bowl in Miami became the venue for this year's Recopa Sudamericana final.

The match was contested by Atlético Nacional, winners of the 1989 Copa Libertadores, and Boca Juniors, winners of the 1989 Supercopa Sudamericana, on March 17, 1990. Boca Juniors managed to defeat Atlético Nacional 0-1 to lift the trophy for the first time.

== Qualified teams ==
Team	Previous finals app.
(Colombia) Atlético Nacional	None
(Argentina) Boca Juniors	None

Bold indicates winning years

== Match details ==
1990 Recopa Sudamericana
March 17, 1990

Atlético Nacional (Colombia)	0–1	(Argentina) Boca Juniors
	Report	Latorre 38'

Orange Bowl, Miami
Referee: José Roberto Wright (Brazil)

**Atlético Nacional**	**Boca Juniors**

GK	1	(Colombia) René Higuita
DF	4	(Colombia) Luis Fernando Herrera
DF		(Colombia) Luis Carlos Perea
DF	5	(Colombia) Giovanni Cassiani
DF	3	(Colombia) Gildardo Gómez
MF		(Colombia) José Ricardo Pérez	(substituted off) 59'
MF	14	(Colombia) Leonel Álvarez
MF	8	(Colombia) Alexis García
MF	13	(Colombia) Luis Alfonso Fajardo
FW		(Colombia) Niver Arboleda	(substituted off) 70'
FW		(Colombia) Jaime Arango
Substitutes:
FW		(Colombia) Faustino Asprilla	(substituted in) 59'
FW		(Colombia) Juan Jairo Galeano	(substituted in) 70'
Manager:
(Colombia) Hernán Darío Gómez

GK	1	(Colombia) Carlos Navarro Montoya
DF	4	(Argentina) Ivar Stafuza
DF	2	(Argentina) Juan Simón
DF	6	(Argentina) José Luis Cuciuffo
DF	3	(Argentina) Víctor Hugo Marchesini
MF	8	(Argentina) Blas Giunta
MF	5	(Argentina) Claudio Marangoni
MF	10	(Argentina) José Daniel Ponce
MF	9	(Argentina) Diego Latorre
FW	7	(Argentina) Alfredo Graciani	(substituted off) 76a'
FW	11	(Argentina) Leonardo Itabel	(substituted off) 76b'
Substitutes:
MF		(Argentina) Diego Soñora	(substituted in) 76a'
MF		(Argentina) Alejandro Barberón	(substituted in) 76b'
Manager:
(Argentina) Carlos Aimar
