= 1994 Supercopa Libertadores =

1994 Supercopa Libertadores 1994 Supercopa Sudamericana João Havelange

Tournament details
- Dates: 7 September – 9 November
- Teams: 16 (from 6 confederations)

Final positions
- Champions: (Argentina) Independiente (1st title)
- Runners-up: (Argentina) Boca Juniors

Tournament statistics
- Matches played: 30
- Goals scored: 69 (2.3 per match)
- Top scorer(s): (Argentina) Sebastián Rambert (5 goals)

The 1994 Supercopa Libertadores was the seventh season of the Supercopa Libertadores, a club football tournament for past Copa Libertadores winners. The tournament was won by Independiente, who beat Boca Juniors 2–1 on aggregate in the final.

== Teams ==
Association	Team (Berth)	Entry stage	Qualification method
(Argentina) Argentina; 6 berths	Independiente (Argentina 1)	Knockout phase	1964, 1965, 1972, 1973, 1974, 1975, 1984 Copa Libertadores champions
(Argentina) Argentina; 6 berths	Estudiantes (Argentina 2)	Knockout phase	1968, 1969, 1970 Copa Libertadores champions
(Argentina) Argentina; 6 berths	Boca Juniors (Argentina 3)	Knockout phase	1977, 1978 Copa Libertadores champions
(Argentina) Argentina; 6 berths	River Plate (Argentina 4)	Knockout phase	1986 Copa Libertadores champions
(Argentina) Argentina; 6 berths	Argentinos Juniors (Argentina 5)	Knockout phase	1985 Copa Libertadores champions
(Argentina) Argentina; 6 berths	Racing (Argentina 6)	Knockout phase	1967 Copa Libertadores champions
(Brazil) Brazil; 5 berths	São Paulo (Brazil 1)	Knockout phase	1992, 1993 Copa Libertadores champions
(Brazil) Brazil; 5 berths	Santos (Brazil 2)	Knockout phase	1962, 1963 Copa Libertadores champions
(Brazil) Brazil; 5 berths	Grêmio (Brazil 3)	Knockout phase	1983 Copa Libertadores champions
(Brazil) Brazil; 5 berths	Flamengo (Brazil 4)	Knockout phase	1981 Copa Libertadores champions
(Brazil) Brazil; 5 berths	Cruzeiro (Brazil 5)	Knockout phase	1976 Copa Libertadores champions
(Chile) Chile; 1 berth	Colo-Colo (Chile 1)	Knockout phase	1991 Copa Libertadores champions
(Colombia) Colombia; 1 berth	Atlético Nacional (Colombia 1)	Knockout phase	1989 Copa Libertadores champions
(Paraguay) Paraguay; 1 berth	Olimpia (Paraguay 1)	Knockout phase	1979, 1990 Copa Libertadores champions
(Uruguay) Uruguay; 2 berths	Peñarol (Uruguay 1)	Knockout phase	1960, 1961, 1966, 1982, 1987 Copa Libertadores champions
(Uruguay) Uruguay; 2 berths	Nacional (Uruguay 2)	Knockout phase	1971, 1980, 1988 Copa Libertadores champions

== Knockout phase ==
=== Bracket ===
Round of 16
(Argentina) River Plate	2	1	3
(Uruguay) Nacional	2	0	2
(Uruguay) Peñarol	1	1	2
(Argentina) Boca Juniors	0	4	4
(Chile) Colo-Colo	4	1	5
(Argentina) Argentinos Juniors	1	1	2
(Colombia) Atlético Nacional	0	1	1
(Brazil) São Paulo	2	1	3
(Brazil) Flamengo	0	0	0
(Argentina) Estudiantes	0	2	2
(Paraguay) Olimpia	2	0	2
(Brazil) Cruzeiro	0	4	4
(Brazil) Grêmio	1	2	3
(Argentina) Racing	1	1	2
(Brazil) Santos	1	0	1
(Argentina) Independiente	0	4	4

Quarterfinals
(Argentina) River Plate	0	1	1 (4)
(Argentina) Boca Juniors (p)	0	1	1 (5)
(Chile) Colo-Colo	2	1	3
(Brazil) São Paulo	1	4	5
(Argentina) Estudiantes	1	0	1
(Brazil) Cruzeiro	0	3	3
(Brazil) Grêmio	1	0	1
(Argentina) Independiente	1	2	3

Semifinals
(Argentina) Boca Juniors	2	0	2
(Brazil) São Paulo	0	1	1
(Brazil) Cruzeiro	1	0	1
(Argentina) Independiente	0	4	4

Finals
(Argentina) Boca Juniors	1	0	1
(Argentina) Independiente	1	1	2

=== Round of 16 ===
The matches were played from 7 September to 29 September.

Team 1	Agg.	Team 2	1st leg	2nd leg
Olimpia (Paraguay)	2–4	(Brazil) Cruzeiro	2–0	0–4
Flamengo (Brazil)	0–2	(Argentina) Estudiantes	0–0	0–2
Santos (Brazil)	1–4	(Argentina) Independiente	1–0	0–4
Grêmio (Brazil)	3–2	(Argentina) Racing	1–1	2–1
Atlético Nacional (Colombia)	1–3	(Brazil) São Paulo	0–2	1–1
Colo-Colo (Chile)	5–2	(Argentina) Argentinos Juniors	4–1	1–1
River Plate (Argentina)	3–2	(Uruguay) Nacional	2–2	1–0
Peñarol (Uruguay)	2–4	(Argentina) Boca Juniors	1–0	1–4

=== Quarterfinals ===
The matches were played from 5 October to 12 October.

Team 1	Agg.	Team 2	1st leg	2nd leg
Estudiantes (Argentina)	1–3	(Brazil) Cruzeiro	1–0	0–3
Grêmio (Brazil)	1–3	(Argentina) Independiente	1–1	0–2
Colo-Colo (Chile)	3–5	(Brazil) São Paulo	2–1	1–4
River Plate (Argentina)	1–1 (4–5 p)	(Argentina) Boca Juniors	0–0	1–1

=== Semifinals ===
The matches were played from 19 October to 26 October.

Team 1	Agg.	Team 2	1st leg	2nd leg
Cruzeiro (Brazil)	1–4	(Argentina) Independiente	1–0	0–4
Boca Juniors (Argentina)	2–1	(Brazil) São Paulo	2–0	0–1

== Final ==
Team 1	Agg.	Team 2	1st leg	2nd leg
Boca Juniors (Argentina)	1–2	(Argentina) Independiente	1–1	0–1

2 November 1994

Boca Juniors (Argentina)	1–1	(Argentina) Independiente
Martínez		Rambert

Estadio Alberto José Armando (La Bombonera), Buenos Aires

9 November 1994

Independiente (Argentina)	1–0	(Argentina) Boca Juniors
Rambert

Estadio Libertadores de América (La Doble Visera), Avellaneda

Independiente won 2–1 on aggregate.

1994 Supercopa
Sudamericana Winners

Independiente
First Title

== See also ==
- List of Copa Libertadores winners
- 1994 Copa Libertadores
- 1995 Recopa Sudamericana
