= Carlos Navarro Montoya =

Colombian footballer (born 1966)

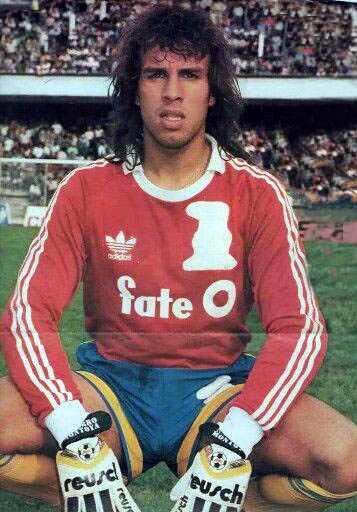
- Navarro Montoya in 1988.

Personal information
- Full name: Carlos Fernando Navarro Montoya
- Date of birth: 26 February 1966 (age 60)
- Place of birth: Medellín, Colombia
- Height: 1.85 m (6 ft 1 in)
- Position: Goalkeeper

Senior career*
| Years | Team | Apps | (Gls) |
| 1984–1986 | Vélez Sarsfield | 67 | (0) |
| 1986–1987 | Independiente Santa Fe | 38 | (0) |
| 1987–1988 | Vélez Sarsfield | 18 | (0) |
| 1988–1996 | Boca Juniors | 323 | (0) |
| 1997 | Extremadura | 23 | (0) |
| 1997–1998 | Mérida | 38 | (0) |
| 1998–2000 | Tenerife | 48 | (0) |
| 2001 | Deportes Concepción | 13 | (0) |
| 2001–2003 | Chacarita Juniors | 62 | (0) |
| 2004–2005 | Independiente | 57 | (0) |
| 2005–2006 | Gimnasia LP | 38 | (0) |
| 2006 | Atlético Paranaense | 2 | (0) |
| 2007 | Nueva Chicago | 19 | (0) |
| 2007–2008 | Olimpo | 13 | (0) |
| 2008–2009 | Luján de Cuyo | | |
| 2009 | Tacuarembó | 8 | (0) |
| Total | | 767 | (0) |

International career
| 1985 | Colombia | 3 | (0) |

Managerial career
- 2013: Chacarita Juniors
- 2013–2020: Boca Juniors (youth)
- 2020: Guadalajara
- * Club domestic league appearances and goals

Carlos Fernando Navarro Montoya (born 26 February 1966) is a retired footballer who played as a goalkeeper. Born in Colombia, he played for the Colombia national team three times, and gained Argentine citizenship later in his career.

During a professional career which spanned 25 years, Navarro Montoya represented teams in Argentina, Colombia, Spain, Chile, Brazil and Uruguay, appearing for 15 clubs (mainly Boca Juniors) and totalling more than 800 games across all competitions.

== Club career ==
Nicknamed El Mono (blond) whilst in Argentina, Navarro Montoya was born in Medellín, Colombia, and he started playing professionally in the former country at only 18, with Club Atlético Vélez Sarsfield. In 1988, after one year in his homeland with Independiente Santa Fe, he joined Boca Juniors, where he would rarely miss a game in nearly ten years – never played in fewer than 35 matches in his full seasons – also setting club records of consecutive games (180) and minutes without conceding a goal (824), and eventually appearing in 396 official games for the Xeneizes. His last appearance, however, ended in defeat, 1–3 at Club Atlético Banfield.

In January 1997, aged almost 31, Montoya joined CF Extremadura in La Liga, suffering relegation with that and his following two teams, CP Mérida and CD Tenerife, also in the first division. After a brief spell in Chile with Club Deportes Concepción, he returned to Argentina and played top-flight football for Chacarita Juniors, Club Atlético Independiente (after the promotion of youngster Óscar Ustari, the 39-year-old did not see his contract renewed) and Club de Gimnasia y Esgrima La Plata, during five seasons combined.

Montoya rarely settled with a team in the following years, playing in his country of adoption but also in Brazil and Uruguay. On 10 July 2009, at the age of 43, he announced his retirement from professional football, stating: "It is 'goodbye', but also 'thank you'".

== International career ==
As a naturalized Argentine, Navarro wanted to represent its national team, but was denied from doing so by FIFA because he had already played for Colombia in three 1986 FIFA World Cup qualifiers – two against the same opponent, Paraguay – conceding four goals.

In 1998 FIFA relented and allowed the player a special dispensation to play for Argentina but, at the age of 32, he was considered too old and never represented his adopted nation.

== Coaching career ==
Montoya's first managerial experience was in Chacarita Juniors, from where he was sacked after only one win in six matches.

In December 2013 he returned to Boca Juniors, this time as deputy director of the youth divisions and youth coach. He covered several roles, until he left his position on 16 September 2020. On 23 September 2020 he took over the Club Deportivo Guadalajara of the Tercera División in Spain, but was dismissed on 24 November after only five league games.

== Honours ==
=== Club ===
Vélez Sarsfield

- Primera División runner-up: 1985 Nacional

Boca Juniors

- Primera División (1): 1992 Apertura
- Supercopa Sudamericana (1): 1989
- Recopa Sudamericana (1): 1990
- Copa Master de Supercopa (1): 1992
- Copa de Oro (1): 1993

=== Individual ===
- Player of the Year of Argentina: 1994
