= Claudio Marangoni =

Argentine footballer

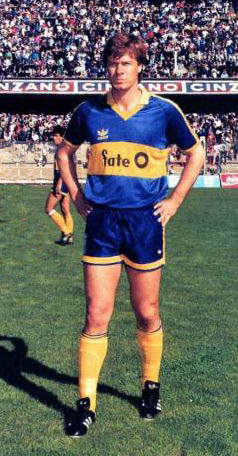
- Marangoni while playing for Boca Juniors, 1988

Personal information
- Full name: Claudio Oscar Marangoni
- Date of birth: 17 November 1954 (age 71)
- Place of birth: Rosario, Argentina
- Height: 1.86 m (6 ft 1 in)
- Position: Midfielder

Senior career*
Years	Team	Apps	(Gls)
1974–1976	Chacarita Juniors	62	(7)
1976–1979	San Lorenzo	135	(25)
1979–1980	Sunderland	20	(3)
1981	Huracán	58	(11)
1982–1988	Independiente	237	(25)
1988–1990	Boca Juniors	81	(7)

International career
1983–1984	Argentina	9	(0)

Managerial career
- 1998: Banfield
- * Club domestic league appearances and goals

Claudio Oscar Marangoni (born 17 November 1954 in Rosario) is an Argentine former footballer who played as a midfielder. He played club football in Argentina and England and played for the Argentina national team at international level.

== Biography ==
Marangoni started his playing career in 1974 with Chacarita Juniors he then joined San Lorenzo in 1976.

In 1979, he joined Sunderland in England where he failed to settle, his contract was terminated in 1980, and he returned to Argentina.

Marangoni played one season for Huracán before joining Club Atlético Independiente in 1982. He won three major titles with the club, the 1983 Metropolitano followed by the Copa Libertadores and Copa Intercontinental in 1984.

In 1988, he left Independiente to join Boca Juniors where he won a further two international tournaments, the Supercopa Sudamericana 1989 and the Recopa Sudamericana 1990.

Upon retirement, Marangoni started Escuela Modelo de Futbol y Deportes, the first-ever professional soccer schools and sports clinics for Argentina's youth.

The schools serve children from age 3-13 and are franchised throughout the country, serving public and private schools, community centers, country clubs and businesses. Integral to the company's model is free tuition for underprivileged children. Since selection, he expanded his training schools to Chile and Spain.

His work was recognized by Endeavor (non-profit) and he was selected as an Endeavor Entrepreneur in 1999. Endeavor is a global non-profit that selects and supports High-Impact Entrepreneurship in emerging markets.

== Honours ==
Independiente

- Primera División (1): 1983 Metropolitano
- Copa Libertadores (1): 1984
- Intercontinental Cup (1): 1984

Boca Juniors

- Supercopa Libertadores (1): 1989
- Recopa Sudamericana (1): 1990
