= Guillermo Ríos =

Argentine footballer (born 1963)

Personal information
- Full name: Guillermo Daniel Ríos
- Date of birth: 6 June 1963 (age 63)
- Place of birth: Argentina
- Position: Defender

Senior career*
Years	Team	Apps	(Gls)
1984–1998	Independiente	337	(3)
- * Club domestic league appearances and goals

Guillermo Daniel Ríos (born 6 June 1963) is an Argentine former footballer who played as a midfielder.

== Early life ==
He was born in 1963 in Argentina. He is a native of Gualeguaychú Department, Argentina.

== Career ==
He started his career with Argentine side Independiente. He made three hundred and thirty-three league appearances and scored three league goals for the club.

== Style of play ==
He mainly operated as a defender. He also operated as a winger and midfielder while playing for Argentine side Independiente.

== Personal life ==
He has been married. He has four children.
