= Claudio Arzeno =

Argentinean footballer (born 1970)

Claudio "El Polaco" Arzeno
Personal information
- Full name: Claudio David Arzeno Pessuto
- Date of birth: 16 October 1970 (age 56)
- Place of birth: Villa María, Argentina
- Position: Defender

Senior career*
Years	Team	Apps	(Gls)
-1998	Club Atlético Independiente	111	(14)
1998-2003	Racing de Santander	111	(8)
2003-2004	Chacarita Juniors	27	(0)
2004-2005	UD Las Palmas	21	(1)

Managerial career
- 2012-2013: CD Puertollano
- 2013: SD Noja
- 2016–2018: Pachuca (assistant)
- 2018–2019: Monterrey (assistant)
- 2019–2021: Inter Miami (assistant)
- 2023: Guadalajara (assistant)
- 2024–2025: UANL (assistant)
- * Club domestic league appearances and goals

Claudio Arzeno (born 16 October 1970 in Villa Maria, Argentina) is a retired Argentinean footballer. He played as a defender, primarily for the Spanish football club Racing de Santander. Arzeno retired in 2006, and later became a coach.
