= Sebastián Rambert =

Argentine footballer (born 1974)

Personal information
- Full name: Sebastián Pascual Rambert
- Date of birth: 30 January 1974 (age 52)
- Place of birth: Bernal, Buenos Aires Province, Argentina
- Position: Striker

Youth career
- Independiente

Senior career*
Years	Team	Apps	(Gls)
1992–1995	Independiente	51	(14)
1995–1997	Internazionale	0	(0)
1996	→ Real Zaragoza (loan)	20	(5)
1996–1997	→ Boca Juniors (loan)	28	(10)
1997–2000	River Plate	37	(5)
2000–2001	Independiente	11	(1)
2001–2002	Iraklis	11	(1)
2002–2003	Arsenal de Sarandí	3	(0)

International career
1994–1995	Argentina	8	(3)

Managerial career
- 2007–2008: San Lorenzo (assistant)
- 2008–2009: América (assistant)
- 2010–2011: San Lorenzo (assistant)
- 2011–2012: Independiente (assistant)
- 2013: Aldosivi
- 2014: Unión San Felipe
- 2015: Crucero del Norte
- 2016: Estudiantes SL
- 2017: Guaraní (assistant)
- 2018–2020: Olimpia (assistant)
- 2021–2022: Libertad (assistant)
- 2022–2023: Chile (assistant)
- 2024–2025: León (assistant)
- * Club domestic league appearances and goals

Sebastián Rambert
Medal record

Representing Argentina

Men's association football

Pan American Games
Gold medal – first place	1995 Mar del Plata	Team competition

Sebastián Pascual Rambert (born 30 January 1974) is an Argentine retired football striker. He is currently the assistant coach of Liga MX club León.

== Playing career ==
In 1995 Rambert transferred from Independiente to Inter Milan. He arrived at the club along with fellow Argentine Javier Zanetti, but he did not enjoy the same success as his compatriot. After an entire season without making a single appearance in Serie A he then transferred to Real Zaragoza in 1996, where he finally received his first minutes in Europe. Rambert played only one season in Spain before returning to his homeland to sign with Boca Juniors. This move was followed by stints at River Plate, Independiente and then a return to Europe for a brief season in Greece with Iraklis. He returned to Argentina to sign with Arsenal de Sarandí, where he ended his playing career in 2003.

== Managerial career ==
He has been an assistant coach to manager Ramón Díaz at Club América and San Lorenzo. He is one of the few players to have played for three of the "Big Five" clubs in Argentina: Boca Juniors, River Plate and Club Atlético Independiente.

In 2022, Rambert joined the technical staff of Eduardo Berizzo in the Chile national team. He followed him to Liga MX club León in September 2024.

== Personal life ==
He was born in the city of Bernal in the Buenos Aires Province of Argentina and is of French descent. In fact, his father, Ángel Rambert, was an Argentine-born forward who began his career with Lanús before transferring to Lyon in France, where he eventually played for their national team after gaining dual nationality.

== Career statistics ==
=== International ===
Appearances and goals by national team and year
National team	Year	Apps	Goals
Argentina	1994	2	1
Argentina	1995	5	3
Total		7	4

Scores and results list Argentina's goal tally first, score column indicates score after each Rambert goal.

List of international goals scored by Sebastián Rambert
No.	Date	Venue	Opponent	Score	Result	Competition	Ref.
1	16 November 1994	Estadio Nacional, Santiago, Chile	Chile	1–0	3–0	Friendly	
2	8 January 1995	King Fahd International Stadium, Riyadh, Saudi Arabia	Japan	1–0	5–1	1995 King Fahd Cup	
3	14 February 1995	Estadio Malvinas Argentinas, Mendoza, Argentina	Bulgaria	3–1	4–1	Friendly	
4	14 February 1995	Estadio Malvinas Argentinas, Mendoza, Argentina	Bulgaria	4–1	4–1	Friendly	

== Honours ==
Independiente

- Primera División Argentina: Clausura 1994

River Plate

- Primera División Argentina: Clausura 1997, Apertura 1997, Apertura 1999, Clausura 2000
- Supercopa Sudamericana: 1997
