= 1989 Supercopa Libertadores =

1989 Supercopa Libertadores João Havelange

Tournament details
- Dates: October 3 – November 29
- Teams: 14 (from 5 confederations)

Final positions
- Champions: (Argentina) Boca Juniors (1st title)
- Runners-up: (Argentina) Independiente

Tournament statistics
- Matches played: 26
- Goals scored: 53 (2.04 per match)
- Top scorer(s): (Argentina) Mauro Airez (Argentina) Rubén Darío Insúa (Colombia) John Jairo Tréllez (3 goals)

The 1989 Supercopa Libertadores was the second edition of the Supercopa Libertadores, CONMEBOL's new international football club tournament. The competition was won by Boca Juniors, who clinched their first title by beating fellow Argentinian side, Independiente in the finals.

The competition was dominated by the Argentine teams, with three of the four semi-finalists coming from Argentina, namely, Boca Juniors, Independiente and Argentinos Juniors. The final between Boca Juniors and Independiente marked the first time in South American club history that both finalists in any competition had come from the same country.

As the new reigning Copa Libertadores champions, Colombian side Atlético Nacional were admitted into the competition increasing the number of competitors to 14.

== First round ==
The matches were played from 3 October to 10 October. Teams from the same nation could not be drawn against one another. Racing Club, as the title holders, entered the competition at the quarterfinal stage. Boca Juniors also advanced to that same stage after a draw of lots.

Team 1	Agg.	Team 2	1st leg	2nd leg
River Plate (Argentina)	3–3 (4-5 p)	(Brazil) Grêmio	2–1	1–2
Estudiantes (Argentina)	3–2	(Uruguay) Peñarol	3–0	0–2
Nacional (Uruguay)	2–3	(Colombia) Atlético Nacional	2–1	0–2
Santos (Brazil)	1–4	(Argentina) Independiente	1–2	0–2
Olimpia (Paraguay)	2–3	(Brazil) Cruzeiro	2–0	0–3
Flamengo (Brazil)	1–3	(Argentina) Argentinos Juniors	0–1	1–2

- Boca Juniors received a bye to the quarter-finals

== Quarter-finals ==
The matches were played from 18 October to 1 November.

Team 1	Agg.	Team 2	1st leg	2nd leg
Grêmio (Brazil)	3–1	(Argentina) Estudiantes	0–1	3–0
Boca Juniors (Argentina)	2–1	(Argentina) Racing	0–0	2–1
Atlético Nacional (Colombia)	2–4	(Argentina) Independiente	2–2	0–2
Cruzeiro (Brazil)	1–3	(Argentina) Argentinos Juniors	1–1	0–2

== Semi-finals ==
The matches were played from 8 November to 16 November.

Team 1	Agg.	Team 2	1st leg	2nd leg
Grêmio (Brazil)	0–2	(Argentina) Boca Juniors	0–0	0–2
Independiente (Argentina)	3–1	(Argentina) Argentinos Juniors	1–0	2–1

== Finals ==
Team 1	Agg.	Team 2	1st leg	2nd leg
Boca Juniors (Argentina)	0–0 (5-3 p)	(Argentina) Independiente	0–0	0–0

== See also ==
- 1989 Copa Libertadores
