= 1988 Copa Libertadores finals =

1988 Copa Libertadores de América finals
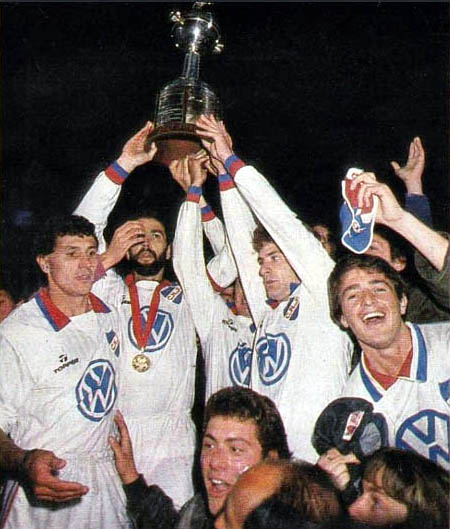
- Nacional, champions
- Event: 1988 Copa Libertadores
Newell's Old Boys	Nacional
(Argentina)	(Uruguay)
1	3

First leg
Newell's Old Boys	Nacional
1	0
- Date: 19 October 1988
- Venue: Gigante de Arroyito, Rosario
- Referee: Hernán Silva
- Attendance: 45,000

Second leg
Nacional	Newell's Old Boys
3	0
- Date: 26 October 1988
- Venue: Centenario, Montevideo
- Referee: Arnaldo C. Coelho
- Attendance: 75,000

The 1988 Copa Libertadores de América finals was the final two-legged tie to determine the 1988 Copa Libertadores champion. It was contested by Uruguayan club Nacional and Argentine club Newell's Old Boys. The first leg of the tie was played on 19 October at Estadio Gigante de Arroyito of Rosario, with the second leg played on 26 October at Estadio Centenario of Montevideo.

Nacional won the series 3–1 on aggregate, achieving their third Copa Libertadores trophy.

== Qualified teams ==
Team	Previous finals app.
(Argentina) Newell's Old Boys	None
(Uruguay) Nacional	5 (1964, 1967, 1969, **1971**, **1980**)

Bold indicates winning years

== Venues ==
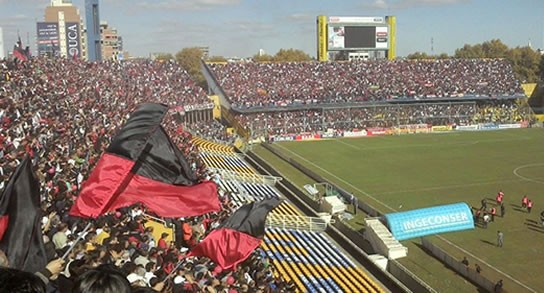
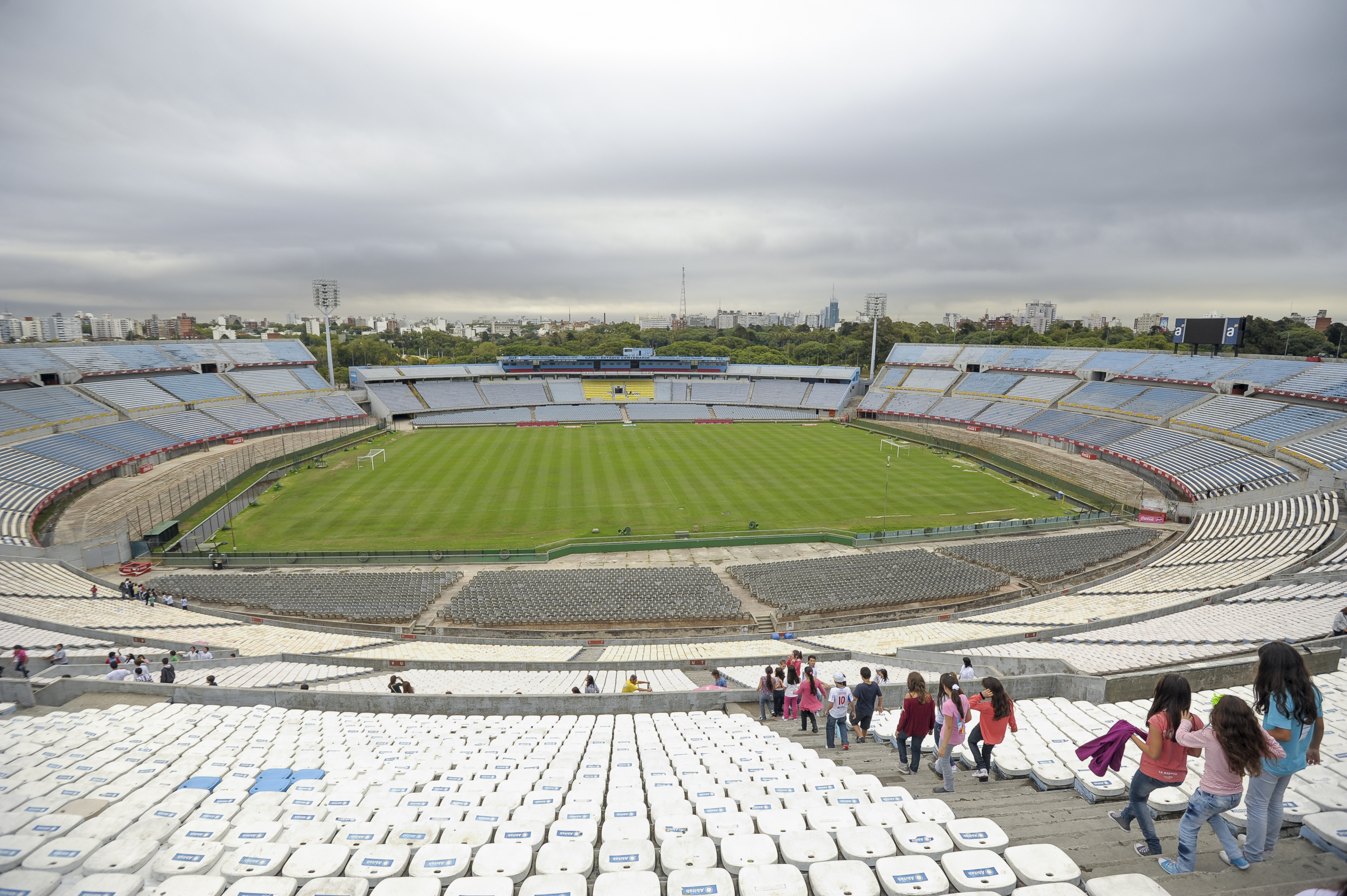
Estadio Gigante de Arroyito (left) and Estadio Centenario, venues for the series

== Match details ==
=== First leg ===
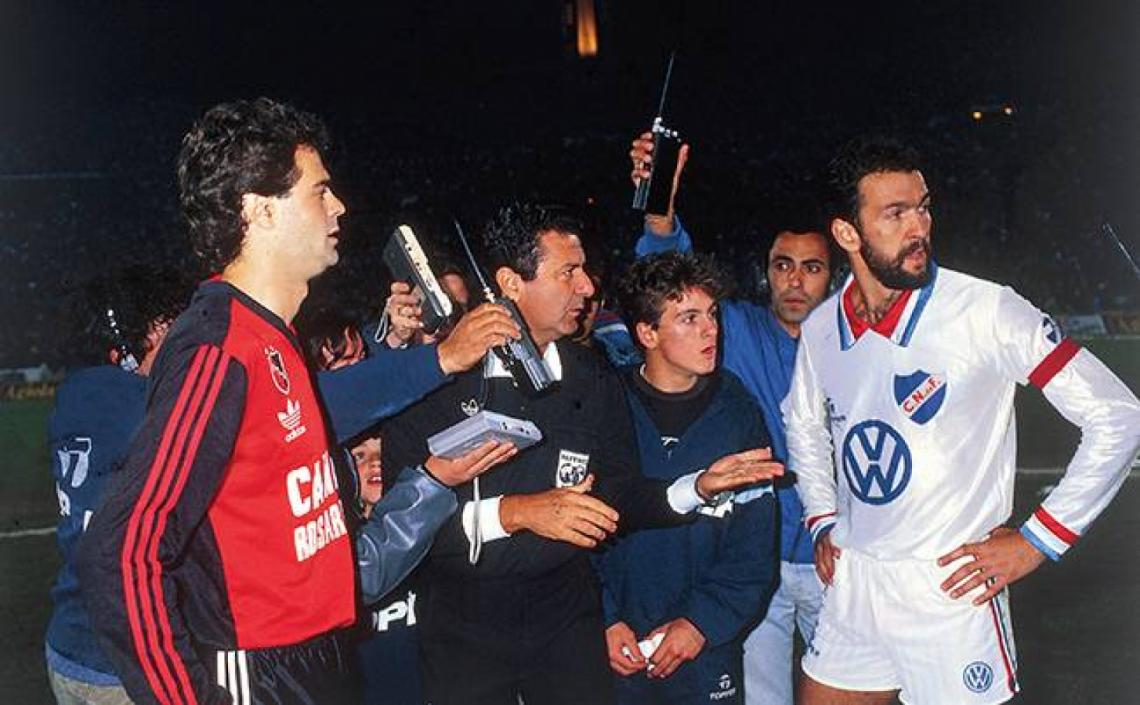
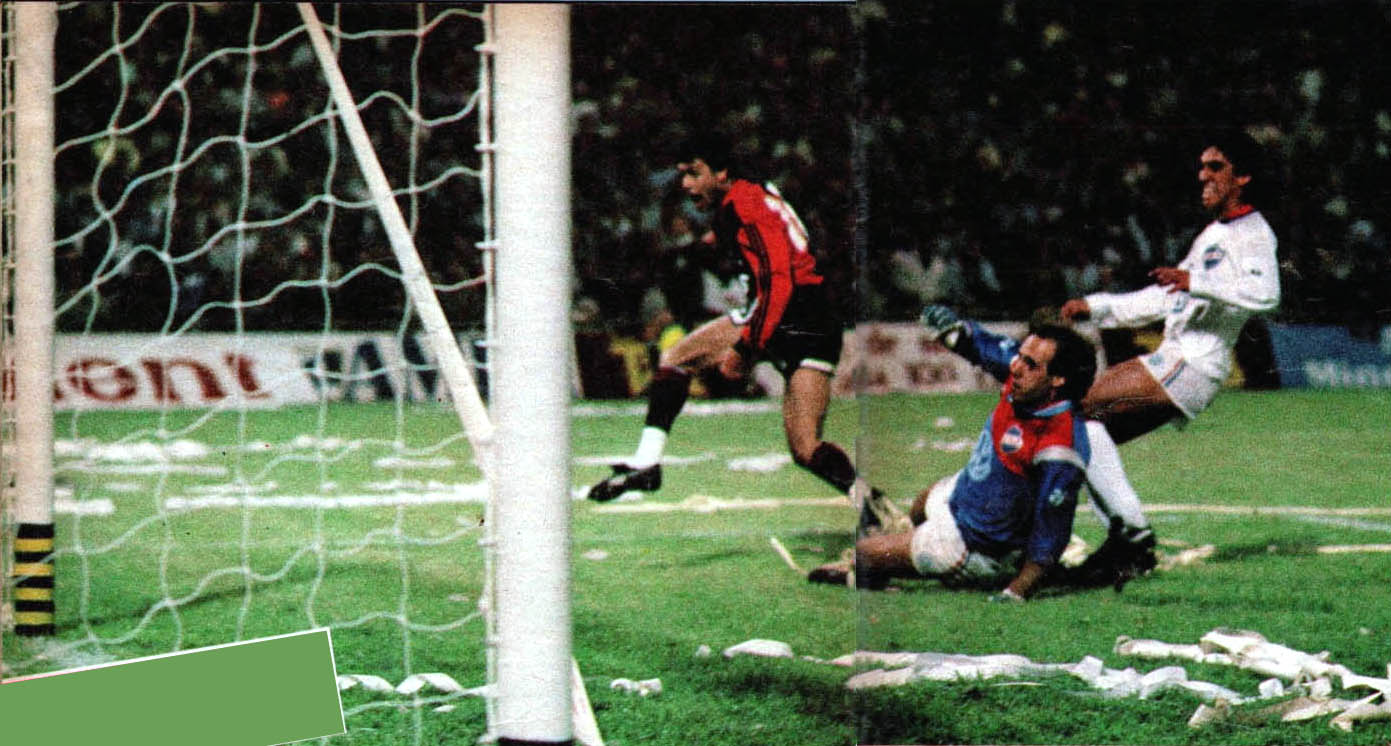
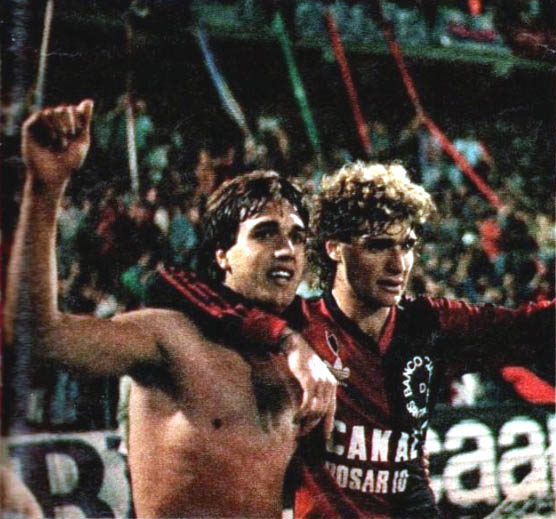
Some moments of the first match in Rosario, fltr: captains Martino and De León, the goal scored by Gabrich, Batistuta and Franco celebrating
1988 Copa Libertadores finals
19 October 1988
First leg

Newell's Old Boys (Argentina)	1–0	(Uruguay) Nacional
Gabrich 60'	Report

Gigante de Arroyito, Rosario
Attendance: 45,000
Referee: Hernán Silva (Chile)

**Newell's**	**Nacional**

GK	1	(Argentina) Norberto Scoponi
DF	19	(Argentina) Darío Franco
DF	2	(Argentina) Jorge Theiler
DF	6	(Argentina) Jorge Pautasso
DF	3	(Argentina) Roberto Sensini
MF	10	(Argentina) Juan J. Rossi
MF	5	(Argentina) Juan Manuel Llop
MF	8	(Argentina) Gerardo Martino (c)	(substituted off) 81'
MF	9	(Argentina) Roque Alfaro
FW	11	(Argentina) Sergio Almirón	(substituted off) 46'
FW	7	(Argentina) Gabriel Batistuta
Substitutes:
FW	16	(Argentina) Jorge Gabrich	(substituted on) 46'
DF	13	(Argentina) Miguel Fullana	(substituted on) 81'
Manager:
(Argentina) José Yudica

GK	1	(Uruguay) Jorge Seré
DF	20	(Uruguay) José Pintos Saldanha
DF	19	(Uruguay) Hugo De León (c)
DF	4	(Uruguay) Felipe Reveléz
DF	23	(Uruguay) Carlos Soca
MF	14	(Uruguay) Santiago Ostolaza
MF	5	(Uruguay) Jorge Cardaccio
MF	8	(Uruguay) Yubert Lemos
MF	10	(Uruguay) William Castro
FW	9	(Uruguay) Ernesto Vargas	(substituted off) 89'
FW	6	(Uruguay) Juan C. de Lima
Substitutes:
FW	21	(Uruguay) Daniel Carreño	(substituted on) 89'
Manager:
(Uruguay) Roberto Fleitas (red card) 51'

=== Second leg ===
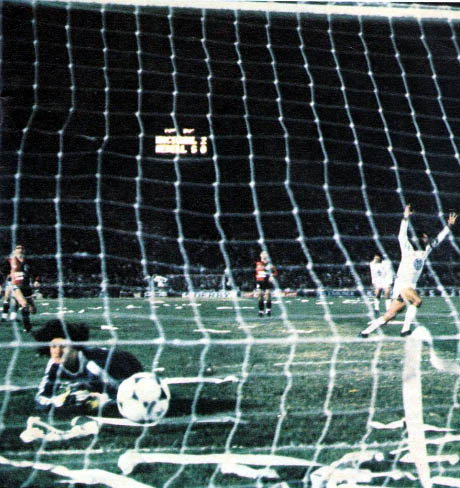
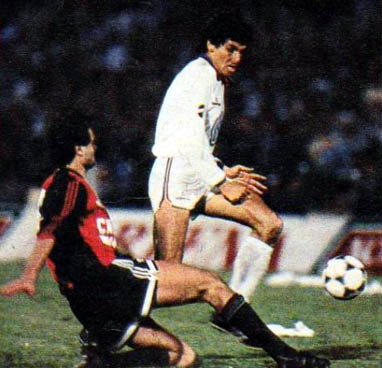
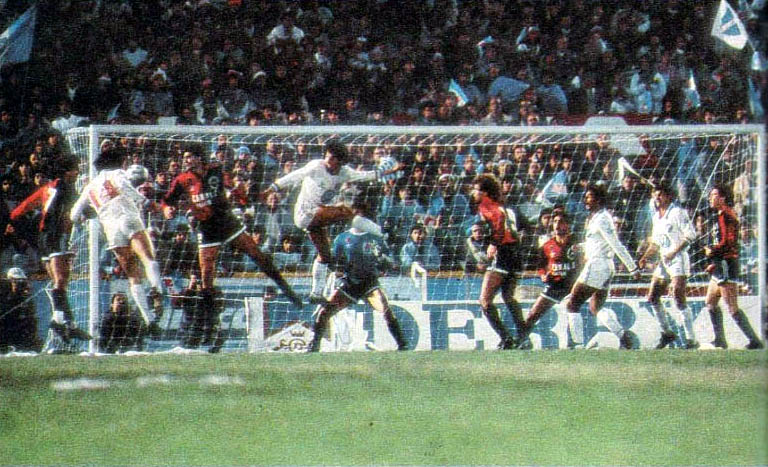
Some moments of the final, fltr: DeLeón scoring by penalty, Theiler and Vargas for the ball, and Ostolaza scoring the 2nd goal
26 October 1988
Second leg

Nacional (Uruguay)	3–0	(Argentina) Newell's Old Boys
Vargas 13'; Ostolaza 36'; De León 78'	Report

Centenario, Montevideo
Attendance: 75,000
Referee: Arnaldo Coelho (Brazil)

**Nacional**	**Newell's**

GK	1	(Uruguay) Jorge Seré
DF	20	(Uruguay) José Pintos Saldanha
DF	19	(Uruguay) Hugo De León (c)
DF	4	(Uruguay) Felipe Reveléz
DF	23	(Uruguay) Carlos Soca
MF	14	(Uruguay) Santiago Ostolaza
MF	5	(Uruguay) Jorge Cardaccio
MF	8	(Uruguay) Yubert Lemos
MF	10	(Uruguay) William Castro	(substituted off) 101'
FW	9	(Uruguay) Ernesto Vargas	(substituted off) 115'
FW	6	(Uruguay) Juan C. de Lima
Substitutes:
FW	7	(Uruguay) Héctor Morán	(substituted on) 101' (red card) 115'
FW	21	(Uruguay) Daniel Carreño	(substituted on) 115'
Manager:
(Uruguay) Roberto Fleitas

GK	1	(Argentina) Norberto Scoponi
DF	19	(Argentina) Darío Franco
DF	2	(Argentina) Jorge Theiler
DF	6	(Argentina) Jorge Pautasso	(red card) 115'
DF	3	(Argentina) Roberto Sensini
MF	10	(Argentina) Juan J. Rossi
MF	5	(Argentina) Juan Manuel Llop		(substituted off) 90'
MF	8	(Argentina) Gerardo Martino (c)
MF	9	(Argentina) Roque Alfaro		(substituted off) 46'
FW	16	(Argentina) Jorge Gabrich
FW	7	(Argentina) Gabriel Batistuta
Substitutes:
FW	11	(Argentina) Sergio Almirón		(substituted on) 46'
FW	15	(Argentina) Víctor Ramos		(substituted on) 90'
Manager:
(Argentina) José Yudica
