= 1989 Recopa Sudamericana =

- Event: Recopa Sudamericana
Nacional	Racing
(Uruguay)	(Argentina)
1	0

First leg
Nacional	Racing
1	0
- Date: January 31, 1989
- Venue: Estadio Centenario, Montevideo
- Referee: Romualdo Arppi Filho (Brazil)
- Attendance: 20,221

Second leg
Racing	Nacional
0	0
- Date: February 6, 1989
- Venue: Estadio José Amalfitani, Buenos Aires
- Referee: Gabriel González (Paraguay)
- Attendance: 50,000

The 1989 Recopa Sudamericana was the first Recopa Sudamericana, a football competition for South American clubs that won the previous year's two most important competitions in the continent: the Copa Libertadores and the Supercopa Sudamericana. The inaugural edition was disputed between Nacional, winners of the 1988 Copa Libertadores, and Racing, winners of the 1988 Supercopa Sudamericana. The first leg was played on January 31 in Montevideo, while the second leg was played in Buenos Aires on February 6.

Nacional won the final series 3-1 on points as Daniel Fonseca of Nacional scored the first goal of the competition as well as the only one in this final.

== Qualified teams ==
Team	Previous finals app.
(Uruguay) Nacional	None
(Argentina) Racing	None

Bold indicates winning years

== Rules ==
The Recopa Sudamericana was played over two legs; home and away. The team that qualified via the Copa Libertadores played the first leg at home. The team that accumulated the most points —two for a win, one for a draw, zero for a loss— after the two legs was crowned the champion. In case of both teams tied on points after regulation of the second leg, the team with the best goal difference won. If the two teams have equal goal difference, a penalty shoot-out ensued according to the Laws of the Game.

== Background ==
Nacional qualified to the Recopa Sudamericana by winning the 1988 Copa Libertadores. It was their third Copa Libertadores title and first in eight years, which they achieved by defeating Argentinean club Newell's Old Boys 3–1 on aggregate. Racing Club earned the right to dispute the trophy after winning the 1988 Supercopa Sudamericana, beating Cruzeiro 3–1 on points. The victory was the club's first international title since winning the 1967 Copa Libertadores.

Prior to the 1989 Recopa, Nacional and Racing Club had previously met four times in South American competition. The first meeting between the two sides took place in the Group 2 of the 1962 Copa Libertadores; Nacional beat Racing Club 3-2 at home, and held La Academia at a 2-2 draw in Avellaneda. Five years later, the two clubs met again in the 1967 Copa Libertadores, this time in the finals. Both legs of the series finished 0-0, requiring a tie-breaking playoff to be played. Racing Club came out on top, winning 2-1.

== Venues ==
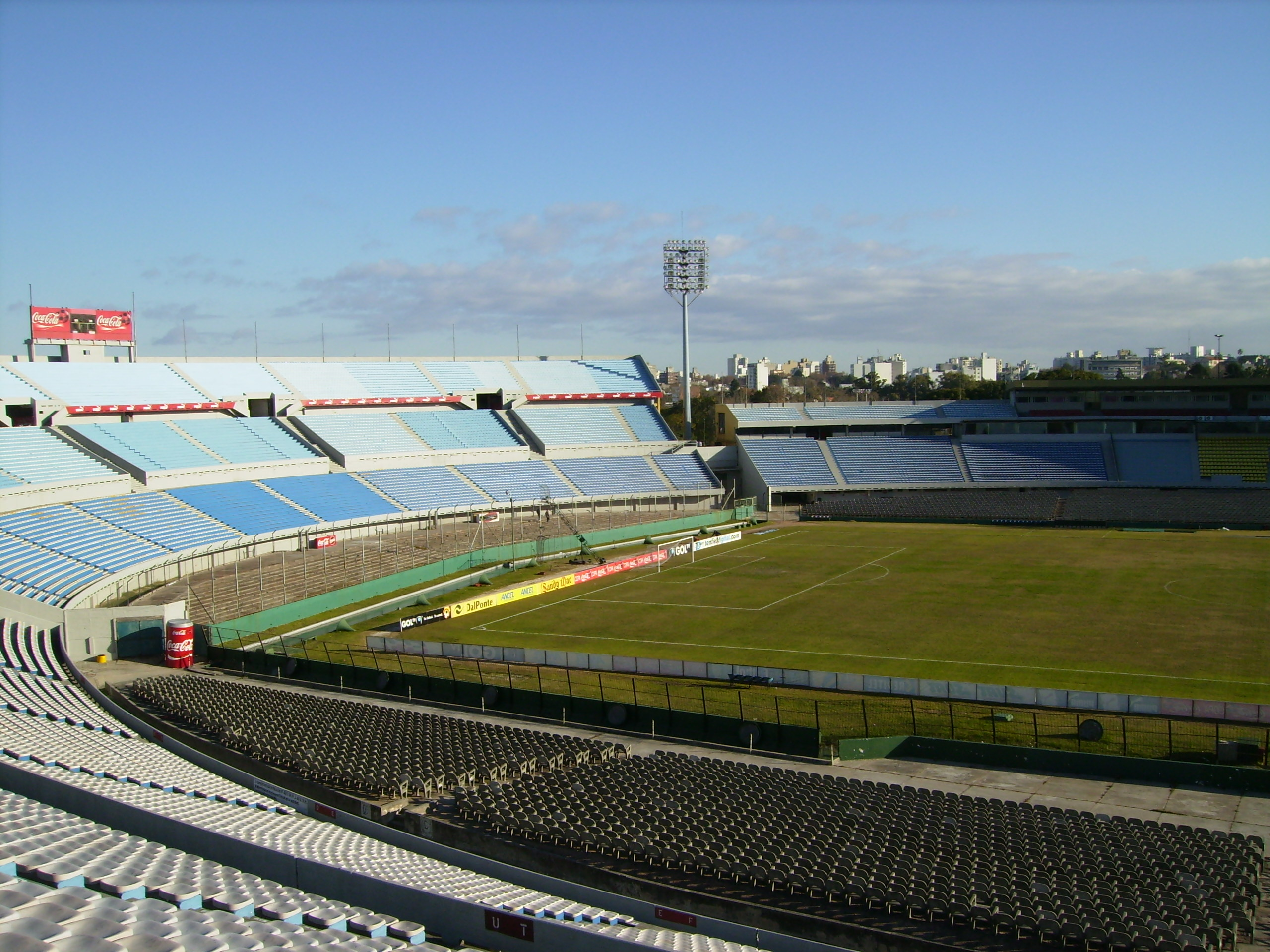
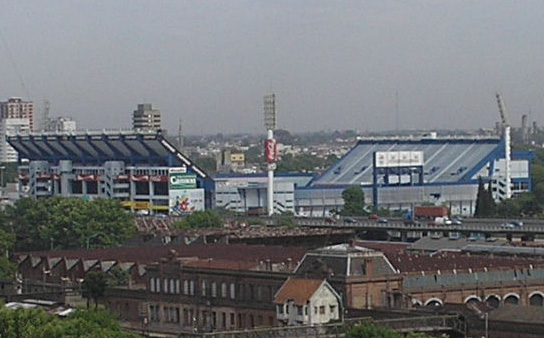
Estadio Centenario (left) and José Amalfitani, venues

The first leg was held in Estadio Centenario, built between 1929 and 1930 to host the 1930 FIFA World Cup, as well as to commemorate the centennial of Uruguay's first constitution. It is listed by FIFA as one of the football world's classic stadiums. Until then, the venue had hosted the final for the Copa América in 1942 and 1995 as well as a final series match for the Copa Libertadores in 1960, 1961, 1962, 1965, 1966, 1967, 1969, 1970, 1971, 1980, 1982, 1983, 1987, and 1988. Estadio Centenario had also hosted a playoff match for the Copa América in 1979 and several Copa Libertadores matches in 1968, 1973, and 1981.

The José Amalfitani Stadium, home of Vélez Sarsfield, was built in 1947 and later remodeled in preparation for the 1978 FIFA World Cup. It had a capacity for 49,540 spectators although it didn't provide seating for all of them like other Argentine stadiums.

== Officials ==
The referees for the 1989 Recopa Sudamericana were Romualdo Arppi Filho of Brazil and Gabriel González of Paraguay. Filho had been an international referee since 1960. He has refereed the 1986 FIFA World Cup final, the 1987 Copa América final, a final match of the 1973 Copa Libertadores, two finals for the Campeonato Brasileiro Série A in 1984 and 1985, and two Campeonato Paulista finals. González had been assigned very few important matches; his most significant work had been to referee a few games of the 1986 FIFA World Cup.

== Match details ==
=== First leg ===
1989 Recopa Sudamericana
January 31, 1989
First leg

Nacional (Uruguay)	1–0	(Argentina) Racing
Fonseca 71'	Report

Estadio Centenario, Montevideo
Attendance: 20,220
Referee: Romualdo Arppi Filho (Brazil)

**Nacional**	**Racing**

GK	**1**	(Uruguay) Jorge Seré
DF	**2**	(Uruguay) Tony Gómez
DF	**4**	(Uruguay) Daniel Felipe Revelez
DW		(Uruguay) Hugo de León
DF		(Uruguay) José Pintos Saldanha
MF	**6**	(Uruguay) Santiago Ostolaza
MF	**8**	(Uruguay) Jorge Daniel Cardaccio
MF		(Uruguay) Javier Cabrera	(substituted off) 67'
MF		(Uruguay) William Castro
FW		(Uruguay) Julio Zoppi	(substituted off) 83'
FW		(Uruguay) Sergio Olivera
Substitutes:
FW		(Uruguay) Daniel Fonseca	(substituted on) 67'
DF		(Uruguay) Carlos Soca	(substituted on) 83'
Manager:
(Uruguay) Héctor Núñez

GK	12	(Uruguay) and (Peru) Julio César Balerio
DF	4	(Uruguay) Carlos E. Vázquez
DF	2	(Argentina) Gustavo Costas
DF	6	(Argentina) Néstor Fabbri
MF	3	(Argentina) Carlos Olarán
MF	7	(Argentina) Jorge Acuña
MF	23	(Argentina) Hugo Lamadrid
MF	13	(Argentina) Mario Videla	(substituted off) 74'
FW	20	(Argentina) Norberto Ortega Sánchez	(substituted off) 78'
FW	18	(Argentina) Ramón Medina Bello
FW	11	(Argentina) Walter R. Fernández
Substitutes:
FW	9	(Argentina) José Raúl Iglesias	(substituted on) 74'
MF	10	(Argentina) Miguel Colombatti	(substituted on) 78'
Manager:
(Argentina) Alfio Basile

Assistant referees:
(Brazil) Luis Carlos Félix
(Brazil) Carlos Sérgio Rosa Martins

=== Second leg ===
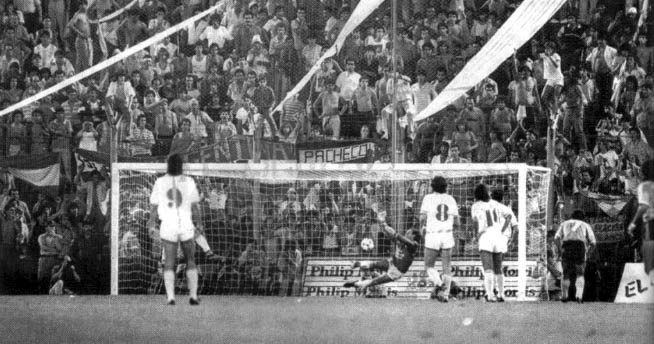
A moment of the match: Jorge Seré stopping the penalty kick by Walter Fernández

February 6, 1989
Second leg

Racing (Argentina)	0–0	(Uruguay) Nacional
	Report

Estadio José Amalfitani, Buenos Aires
Attendance: 50,000
Referee: Gabriel González (Paraguay)

**Racing**	**Nacional**

GK	**12**	(Uruguay) and (Peru) Julio César Balerio
DF	**4**	(Uruguay) Carlos E. Vázquez
DF	**2**	(Argentina) Gustavo Costas
DF	**6**	(Argentina) Néstor Fabbri	(substituted off) 24'
MF	**3**	(Argentina) Carlos Olarán
MF	**7**	(Argentina) Jorge Acuña
MF	**23**	(Argentina) Hugo Lamadrid
MF	**13**	(Argentina) Mario Videla	(substituted off) 76'
FW	**18**	(Argentina) Ramón Medina Bello
FW	**9**	(Argentina) José Raúl Iglesias
FW	**11**	(Argentina) Walter R. Fernández
Substitutes:
DF	16	(Argentina) Cosme Zaccanti	(substituted on) 24'
MF	**10**	(Argentina) Miguel Colombatti	(substituted on) 76'
Manager:
(Argentina) Alfio Basile

GK	**1**	(Uruguay) Jorge Seré
DF	**2**	(Uruguay) Tony Gómez
DF	**4**	(Uruguay) Daniel Felipe Revelez
DF	**3**	(Uruguay) Hugo de León
DF		(Uruguay) Carlos Soca
MF	**6**	(Uruguay) Santiago Ostolaza
MF	**8**	(Uruguay) Jorge Daniel Cardaccio
MF		(Uruguay) Javier Cabrera
MF		(Uruguay) William Castro
FW		(Uruguay) Julio Zoppi	(substituted off) 60'
FW		(Uruguay) Sergio Olivera	(substituted off) 80'
Substitutes:
FW	9	(Uruguay) Daniel Fonseca	(substituted on) 60'
DF		(Uruguay) Enrique Saravia	(substituted on) 80'
Manager:
(Uruguay) Héctor Núñez

Assistant referees:
(Paraguay) Carlos Maciel
(Paraguay) Estanislao Barrientos
