= 1988 Copa Interamericana =

- Event: Copa Interamericana
Olimpia	Nacional
(Honduras)	(Uruguay)
1	5
- (on aggregate)

First leg
Olimpia	Nacional
1	1
- Date: March 5, 1989
- Venue: Tiburcio C. Andino, Tegucigalpa
- Referee: Arturo Brizio (Mexico)
- Attendance: 45,000

Second leg
Nacional	Olimpia
4	0
- Date: March 29, 1989
- Venue: Estadio Centenario, Montevideo
- Referee: Abel Gnecco (Argentina)
- Attendance: 38,000

The 1988 Copa Interamericana was the 11th staging of this competition. The final took place between Nacional (winners of the 1988 Copa Libertadores) and Olimpia (2inners of the 1988 CONCACAF Champions' Cup) and was staged over two legs on 5 and 29 March 1989.

After the first leg in Tegucigalpa ended 1–1, Nacional easily defeated Olimpia 4–0 in Montevideo to win their second Copa Interamericana. With this achievement, the Uruguayan side won their fourth international trophy within five months so they had previously won the Copa Libertadores, Copa Intercontinental and Recopa.

== Qualified teams ==
Team	Qualification	Previous final app.
(Uruguay) Nacional	1988 Copa Libertadores champion	**1971**, 1980
(Honduras) Olimpia	1988 CONCACAF Champions' Cup champion	1972

- **Bold** indicates winning years

== Venues ==
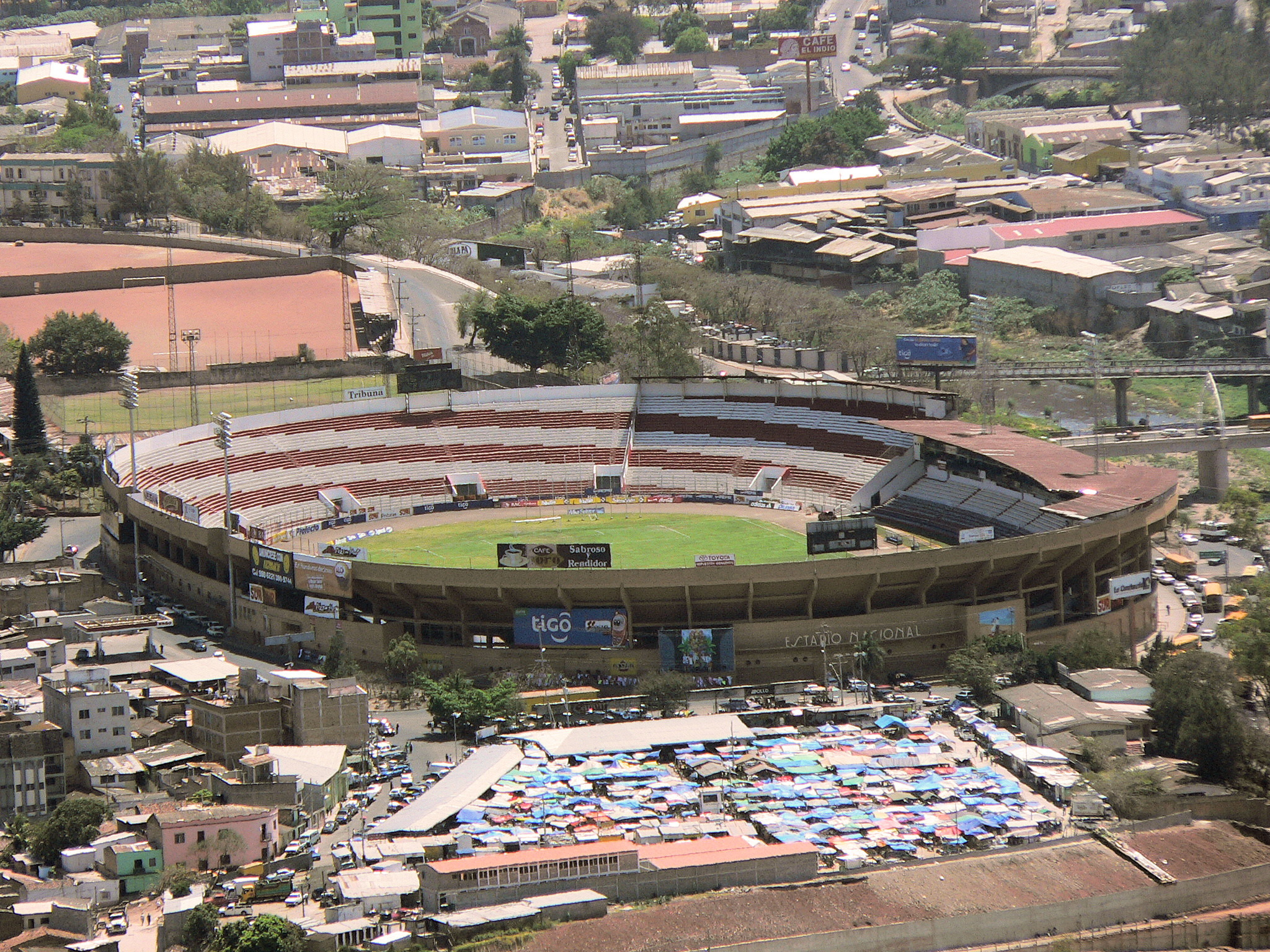
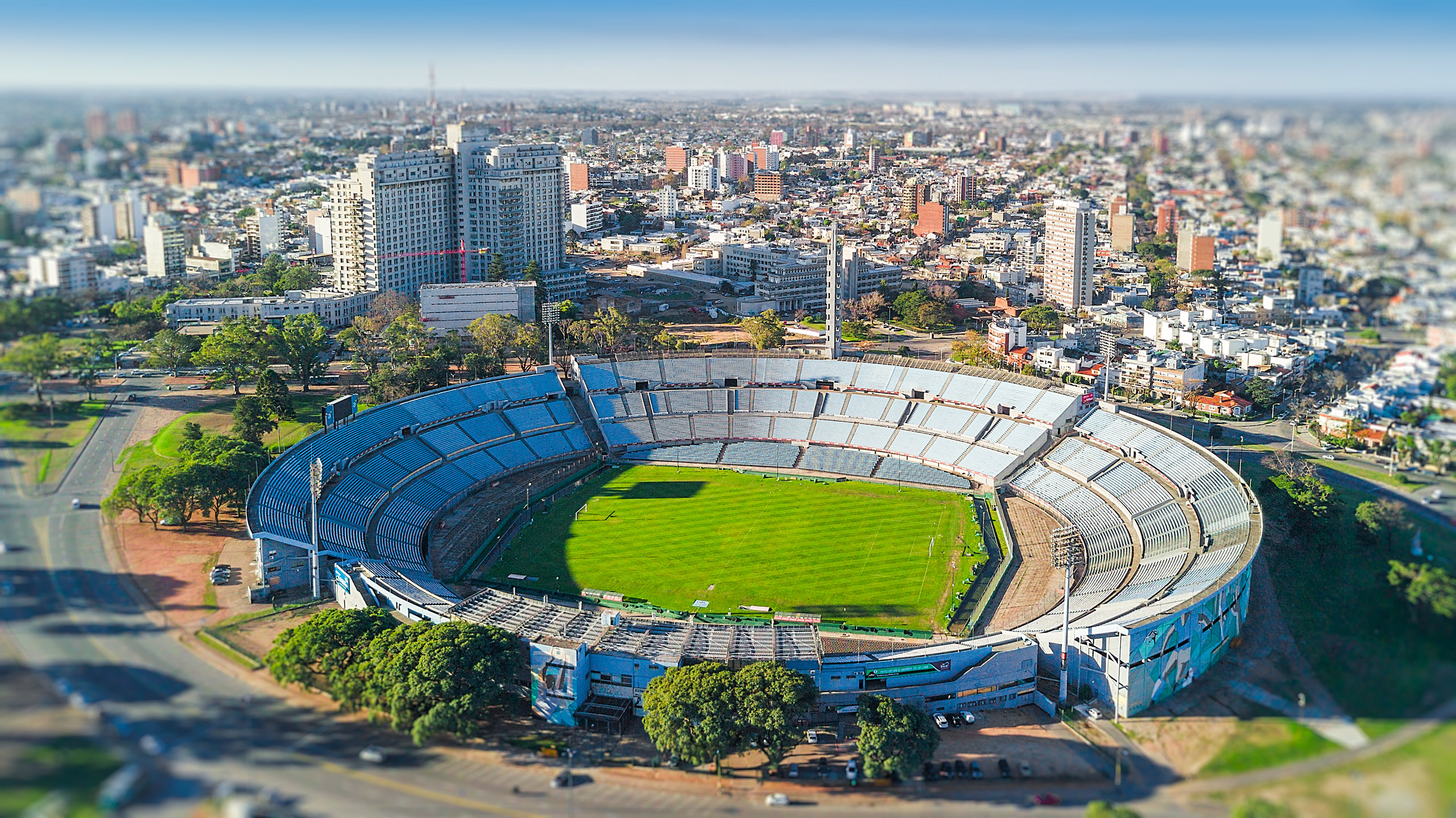
Estadio Tiburcio Andino (left) and Estadio Centenario, venues for the series

== Match details ==
=== First leg ===
1988 Copa Interamericana
March 5, 1989
First leg

Olimpia (Honduras)	1–1	(Uruguay) Nacional
Rivera 66'		Fonseca 17'

Tiburcio Andino, Tegucigalpa
Attendance: 45,000
Referee: Arturo Brizio (Mexico)

**Olimpia**	**Nacional**

GK	(Honduras) Belarmino Rivera
DF	(Honduras) Daniel Zapata
DF	(Honduras) Ruiz
DF	(Honduras) Galindo
DF	(Honduras) Williams
MF	(Honduras) Antonio Hernández
MF	(Honduras) Espinoza
MF	(Uruguay) Vicente Daniel Viera
MF	(Honduras) Juan Flores
FW	(Honduras) Juan Carlos Contreras
FW	(Honduras) Ángel Flores
Manager:
(Uruguay) Estanislao Malinowski

GK		(Uruguay) Jorge Seré
DF		(Uruguay) Tony Gómez
DF		(Uruguay) Daniel Felipe Revelez
DF		(Uruguay) Hugo De León
DF		(Uruguay) Carlos Soca
MF		(Uruguay) Jorge Cardaccio
MF		(Uruguay) Santiago Ostolaza
MF		(Uruguay) William Castro
FW	**15**	(Uruguay) Luis Noé
FW	**9**	(Uruguay) Daniel Fonseca
FW		(Uruguay) Jacinto Cabrera	(substituted off) 31'
Substitutes:
FW		(Uruguay) Héctor Morán	(substituted on) 31'
Manager:
(Uruguay) Héctor Núñez

=== Second leg ===
March 29, 1989
First leg

Nacional (Uruguay)	4–0	(Honduras) Olimpia
Fonseca 17'; Ostolaza 23'; Noé 57', 85'

Estadio Centenario, Montevideo
Attendance: 38,000
Referee: Abel Gnecco (Argentina)

**Nacional**	**Olimpia**

GK		(Uruguay) Jorge Seré
DF		(Uruguay) Tony Gómez
DF		(Uruguay) Felipe Revelez
DF		(Uruguay) Hugo De León
DF		(Uruguay) José Pintos Saldanha	(substituted off) 54'
MF		(Uruguay) Jorge Cardaccio
MF		(Uruguay) Santiago Ostolaza
MF		(Uruguay) William Castro
MF	**15**	(Uruguay) Luis Noé
FW	**9**	(Uruguay) Daniel Fonseca
FW		(Uruguay) Jacinto Cabrera	(substituted off) 71'
Substitutes:
DF		(Uruguay) Carlos Soca	(substituted on) 54'
MF		(Uruguay) José Enrique Peña	(substituted on) 71'
Manager:

GK	(Honduras) Belarmino Rivera
DF	(Honduras) Daniel Zapata
DF	(Honduras) Ruiz
DF	(Honduras) Galindo
DF	(Honduras) Mesía
MF	(Honduras) Antonio Hernández
MF	(Honduras) Espinoza
MF	(Honduras) Tovar	(substituted off) 65'
FW	(Honduras) Juan Carlos Contreras	(substituted off) 54'
FW	(Honduras) Juan Flores
FW	(Honduras) Dolmo Flores
Substitutes:
FW	(Honduras) Javier Flores	(substituted on) 54'
MF	(Honduras) Chacón	(substituted on) 65'
Manager:
(Uruguay) Estanislao Malinowski
