= 1990 FIFA World Cup Group E =

Football tournament group stage

Play in Group E of the 1990 FIFA World Cup completed on 21 June 1990. Spain won the group, and advanced to the second round, along with Belgium and Uruguay. South Korea failed to advance.

== Standings ==
Pos	Team	Pld	W	D	L	GF	GA	GD	Pts	Qualification
1	Spain	3	2	1	0	5	2	+3	5	Advance to knockout stage
2	Belgium	3	2	0	1	6	3	+3	4	Advance to knockout stage
3	Uruguay	3	1	1	1	2	3	−1	3	Advance to knockout stage
4	South Korea	3	0	0	3	1	6	−5	0	

Source: FIFA
Rules for classification: Group stage tiebreakers

== Matches ==
All times local (CEST/UTC+2)

=== Belgium vs South Korea ===
12 June 1990
17:00

Belgium	2–0	South Korea
Degryse 53'; De Wolf 64'

Stadio Marc'Antonio Bentegodi, Verona
Attendance: 32,790
Referee: Vincent Mauro (United States)

Belgium	South Korea

GK	1	Michel Preud'homme
SW	7	Stéphane Demol
DF	2	Eric Gerets (c)
DF	4	Lei Clijsters
DF	16	Michel De Wolf
MF	5	Bruno Versavel
MF	6	Marc Emmers
MF	8	Franky Van der Elst
MF	10	Enzo Scifo
FW	9	Marc Degryse
FW	19	Marc Van Der Linden	(substituted off) 46'
Substitutions:
GK	12	Gilbert Bodart
MF	11	Jan Ceulemans	(substituted on) 46'
DF	13	Georges Grün
FW	21	Marc Wilmots
MF	22	Patrick Vervoort
Manager:
Guy Thys

GK	21	Choi In-Young
DF	2	Park Kyung-Hoon
DF	3	Choi Kang-Hee
DF	5	Chung Yong-Hwan (c)
DF	17	Gu Sang-Bum
MF	20	Hong Myung-Bo
MF	7	Noh Soo-Jin		(substituted off) 62'
MF	22	Lee Young-jin		(substituted off) 46'
MF	14	Choi Soon-Ho	(yellow card) 39'
FW	16	Kim Joo-Sung
FW	18	Hwang Sun-Hong
Substitutions:
GK	19	Jeong Gi-Dong
MF	4	Yoon Deuk-Yeo
FW	6	Lee Tae-Ho		(substituted on) 62'
FW	9	Hwangbo Kwan
DF	15	Cho Min-Kook		(substituted on) 46'
Manager:
Lee Hoi-Taek

Assistant referees:
Alan Snoddy (Northern Ireland)
George Courtney (England)

=== Uruguay vs Spain ===
13 June 1990
17:00

Uruguay	0–0	Spain

Stadio Friuli, Udine
Attendance: 35,713
Referee: Helmut Kohl (Austria)

Uruguay	Spain

GK	1	Fernando Álvez
SW	3	Hugo de León
RB	4	José Herrera
CB	2	Nelson Gutiérrez
LB	6	Alfonso Domínguez
DM	5	José Perdomo	(yellow card) 10'
CM	20	Ruben Pereira		(substituted off) 64'
CM	10	Rubén Paz
AM	9	Enzo Francescoli (c)	(yellow card) 80'
CF	7	Antonio Alzamendi		(substituted off) 64'
CF	11	Rubén Sosa
Substitutions:
GK	22	Javier Zeoli
DF	14	José Pintos Saldanha
MF	15	Gabriel Correa		(substituted on) 64'
MF	16	Pablo Bengoechea
FW	18	Carlos Aguilera		(substituted on) 64'
Manager:
Óscar Tabárez

GK	1	Andoni Zubizarreta
SW	4	Genar Andrinúa
RB	2	Chendo
CB	5	Manolo Sanchís
LB	3	Manolo Jiménez	(yellow card) 23'
RM	21	Míchel
CM	15	Roberto
CM	6	Rafael Martín Vázquez
LM	11	Francisco Villarroya	(yellow card) 70'	(substituted off) 79'
CF	20	Manolo		(substituted off) 79'
CF	9	Emilio Butragueño (c)
Substitutions:
GK	13	Juan Carlos Ablanedo
DF	8	Quique
DF	14	Alberto Górriz		(substituted on) 79'
MF	18	Rafael Paz		(substituted on) 79'
FW	19	Julio Salinas
Manager:
Luis Suárez

Assistant referees:
Alexey Spirin (Soviet Union)
Siegfried Kirschen (East Germany)

=== Belgium vs Uruguay ===
17 June 1990
21:00

Belgium	3–1	Uruguay
Clijsters 15'; Scifo 22'; Ceulemans 46'		Bengoechea 72'

Stadio Marc'Antonio Bentegodi, Verona
Attendance: 33,759
Referee: Siegfried Kirschen (East Germany)

Belgium	Uruguay

GK	1	Michel Preud'homme
SW	7	Stéphane Demol
RB	2	Eric Gerets	(yellow card) 36' (yellow-red card) 42'
CB	13	Georges Grün
LB	16	Michel De Wolf
RM	4	Lei Clijsters	(substituted off) 46'
CM	8	Franky Van der Elst
CM	10	Enzo Scifo
LM	5	Bruno Versavel	(substituted off) 73'
CF	11	Jan Ceulemans (c)
CF	9	Marc Degryse
Substitutions:
GK	20	Filip De Wilde
MF	6	Marc Emmers	(substituted on) 46'
FW	14	Nico Claesen
FW	19	Marc Van Der Linden
MF	22	Patrick Vervoort	(substituted on) 73'
Manager:
Guy Thys

GK	1	Fernando Álvez
SW	2	Nelson Gutiérrez
RB	4	José Herrera
CB	3	Hugo de León
LB	6	Alfonso Domínguez
CM	8	Santiago Ostolaza	(substituted off) 56'
CM	5	José Perdomo
RW	7	Antonio Alzamendi	(substituted off) 46'
AM	9	Enzo Francescoli (c)
LW	10	Rubén Paz
CF	11	Rubén Sosa	(yellow card) 41'
Substitutions:
GK	22	Javier Zeoli
DF	14	José Pintos Saldanha
MF	16	Pablo Bengoechea	(substituted on) 56'
FW	18	Carlos Aguilera	(substituted on) 46'
MF	20	Ruben Pereira
Manager:
Óscar Tabárez

Assistant referees:
Peter Mikkelsen (Denmark)
Alexey Spirin (Soviet Union)

=== South Korea vs Spain ===
17 June 1990
21:00

South Korea	1–3	Spain
Hwangbo Kwan 43'		Míchel 23', 61', 81'

Stadio Friuli, Udine
Attendance: 32,733
Referee: Elías Jácome (Ecuador)

South Korea	Spain

GK	21	Choi In-Young
DF	2	Park Kyung-Hoon		(substituted off) 68'
DF	3	Choi Kang-Hee
DF	4	Yoon Deuk-Yeo	(yellow card) 52'
DF	17	Gu Sang-Bum
MF	20	Hong Myung-Bo
MF	8	Chung Hae-Won	(yellow card) 29'	(substituted off) 52'
MF	14	Choi Soon-Ho (c)
MF	16	Kim Joo-Sung
FW	9	Hwangbo Kwan	(yellow card) 69'
FW	11	Byun Byung-Joo
Substitutions:
GK	19	Jeong Gi-Dong
MF	7	Noh Soo-Jin		(substituted on) 52'
FW	12	Lee Heung-Sil
DF	13	Chung Jong-Soo		(substituted on) 68'
DF	15	Cho Min-Kook
Manager:
Lee Hoi-Taek

GK	1	Andoni Zubizarreta
SW	4	Genar Andrinúa
RB	2	Chendo
CB	14	Alberto Górriz
CB	5	Manuel Sanchís
LB	11	Francisco Villarroya
CM	15	Roberto	(substituted off) 81'
CM	21	Míchel
CM	6	Rafael Martín Vázquez
CF	9	Emilio Butragueño (c)	(substituted off) 76'
CF	19	Julio Salinas
Substitutions:
GK	13	Juan Carlos Ablanedo
DF	8	Quique
MF	10	Fernando Gómez	(substituted on) 76'
MF	16	José Mari Bakero	(substituted on) 81'
DF	17	Fernando Hierro
Manager:
Luis Suárez

Assistant referees:
Pierluigi Magni (Italy)
Juan Carlos Loustau (Argentina)

=== Belgium vs Spain ===
21 June 1990
17:00

Belgium	1–2	Spain
Vervoort 29'		Míchel 26' (pen.); Górriz 38'

Stadio Marc'Antonio Bentegodi, Verona
Attendance: 35,950
Referee: Juan Carlos Loustau (Argentina)

Belgium	Spain

GK	1	Michel Preud'homme
DF	3	Philippe Albert
DF	7	Stéphane Demol
DF	16	Michel De Wolf
MF	22	Patrick Vervoort
MF	6	Marc Emmers	(substituted off) 31'
MF	8	Franky Van der Elst
MF	10	Enzo Scifo
MF	18	Lorenzo Staelens	(substituted off) 78'
FW	9	Marc Degryse
FW	11	Jan Ceulemans (c)
Substitutions:
GK	12	Gilbert Bodart
MF	5	Bruno Versavel
DF	15	Jean-François De Sart
DF	17	Pascal Plovie	(substituted on) 31'
FW	19	Marc Van der Linden	(substituted on) 78'
Manager:
Guy Thys

GK	1	Andoni Zubizarreta
SW	4	Genar Andrinúa
RB	2	Chendo
CB	14	Alberto Górriz
CB	5	Manolo Sanchís
LB	11	Francisco Villarroya
CM	15	Roberto
AM	21	Míchel
AM	6	Rafael Martín Vázquez
CF	9	Emilio Butragueño (c)	(substituted off) 82'
CF	19	Julio Salinas	(substituted off) 88'
Substitutions:
GK	22	José Ochotorena
DF	3	Manolo Jiménez
FW	7	Miguel Pardeza	(substituted on) 88'
DF	12	Rafael Alkorta	(substituted on) 82'
MF	18	Rafa Paz
Manager:
Luis Suárez

Assistant referees:
Carlos Maciel (Paraguay)
Vincent Mauro (United States)

=== South Korea vs Uruguay ===
21 June 1990
17:00

South Korea	0–1	Uruguay
		Fonseca 90+1'

Stadio Friuli, Udine
Attendance: 29,039
Referee: Tullio Lanese (Italy)

South Korea	Uruguay

GK	21	Choi In-Young
DF	2	Park Kyung-Hoon
DF	3	Choi Kang-Hee	(yellow card) 62'
DF	4	Yoon Deuk-Yeo	(yellow card) 49' (yellow-red card) 70'
DF	13	Chung Jong-Soo
MF	20	Hong Myung-Bo
MF	12	Lee Heung-Sil	(yellow card) 22'
MF	14	Choi Soon-Ho (c)
MF	16	Kim Joo-Sung
FW	9	Hwangbo Kwan		(substituted off) 79'
FW	11	Byun Byung-Joo		(substituted off) 43'
Substitutions:
GK	19	Jeong Gi-Dong
MF	7	Noh Soo-Jin
MF	8	Chung Hae-Won		(substituted on) 79'
DF	15	Cho Min-Kook
FW	18	Hwang Sun-Hong		(substituted on) 43'
Manager:
Lee Hoi-Taek

GK	1	Fernando Álvez
SW	3	Hugo de León
DF	4	José Herrera	(yellow card) 44'
DF	6	Alfonso Domínguez
DF	2	Nelson Gutiérrez
MF	10	Rubén Paz
MF	9	Enzo Francescoli (c)
MF	8	Santiago Ostolaza	(yellow card) 23'	(substituted off) 46'
MF	5	José Perdomo
FW	17	Sergio Martínez
FW	11	Rubén Sosa		(substituted off) 62'
Substitutions:
GK	22	Javier Zeoli
DF	14	José Pintos Saldanha
MF	16	Pablo Bengoechea
FW	18	Carlos Aguilera		(substituted on) 46'
FW	19	Daniel Fonseca		(substituted on) 62'
Manager:
Óscar Tabárez

Assistant referees:
Jean-Fidèle Diramba (Gabon)
Neji Jouini (Tunisia)

== See also ==
- Belgium at the FIFA World Cup
- South Korea at the FIFA World Cup
- Spain at the FIFA World Cup
- Uruguay at the FIFA World Cup
