= 1988 Intercontinental Cup =

PSV	Nacional
(Netherlands)	(Uruguay)
2	2
- After extra time Nacional won 7–6 on penalties
- Date: 11 December 1988
- Venue: National Stadium, Tokyo
- Man of the Match: Santiago Ostolaza (Nacional)
- Referee: Jesús Díaz (Colombia)
- Attendance: 62,000

The 1988 Intercontinental Cup was an Association football match played on 11 December 1988 between PSV of Netherlands, winners of the 1987–88 European Cup, and Nacional of Uruguay, winners of the 1988 Copa Libertadores. The match was played at the neutral venue of the National Stadium in Tokyo in front of 62,000 fans. Santiago Ostolaza was named as man of the match.

== Match details ==
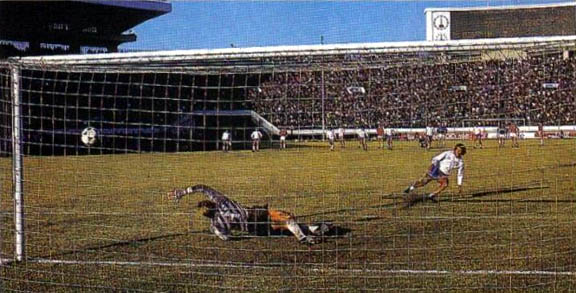
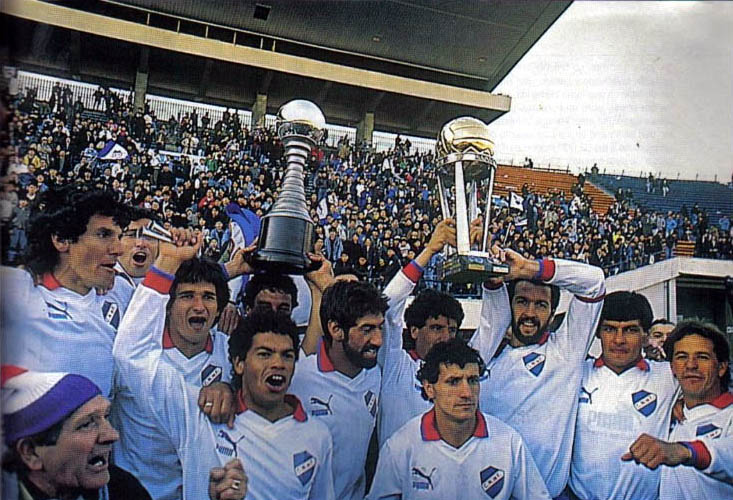
(Left): Tony Gómez scoring the last penalty kick that allowed Nacional to win the series; (right): the Uruguayans celebrating
1988 Intercontinental Cup
11 December 1988
12:00 JST

PSV (Netherlands)	2–2 (a.e.t.)	(Uruguay) Nacional
Romário 75'; Koeman 110' (pen.)	Report	Ostolaza 7', 119'
Penalties
Koeman (penalty scored); Kieft (penalty missed); Gillhaus (penalty scored); Romário (penalty scored); Lerby (penalty missed); Ellerman (penalty scored); Valckx (penalty scored); Gerets (penalty missed); Koot (penalty scored); Van Aerle (penalty missed)	6–7	(penalty scored) Lemos; (penalty missed) Carreño; (penalty missed) Morán; (penalty scored) Castro; (penalty scored) De León; (penalty scored) De Lima; (penalty scored) Revelez; (penalty missed) Pintos; (penalty scored) Ostolaza; (penalty scored) Gómez

National Stadium, Tokyo
Attendance: 62,000
Referee: Jesús Díaz (Colombia)

PSV	Nacional

GK	1	(Netherlands) Hans van Breukelen
DF	2	(Belgium) Eric Gerets (c)
DF	4	(Netherlands) Ronald Koeman	(yellow card) 5'
DF	3	(Netherlands) Adick Koot
DF	5	(Denmark) Jan Heintze		(substituted off) 73'
MF	11	(Netherlands) Juul Ellerman	(yellow card) 15'
MF	7	(Netherlands) Berry van Aerle
MF	8	(Netherlands) Gerald Vanenburg		(substituted off) 90'
MF	6	(Denmark) Søren Lerby	(yellow card) 33'
FW	9	(Brazil) Romário
FW	10	(Netherlands) Wim Kieft
Substitutes:
MF	12	(Netherlands) Hans Gillhaus		(substituted on) 73'
FW	15	(Netherlands) Stan Valckx		(substituted on) 90'
Manager:
(Netherlands) Guus Hiddink

GK	1	(Uruguay) Jorge Seré
DF	2	(Uruguay) Tony Gómez
DF	3	(Uruguay) Hugo de León (c)
DF	4	(Uruguay) Daniel Revélez	(yellow card) 11'
DF	5	(Uruguay) José Pintos	(yellow card) 109'
MF	6	(Uruguay) Santiago Ostolaza
MF	8	(Uruguay) Yubert Lemos
MF	10	(Uruguay) Jorge Cardaccio		(substituted off) 113'
FW	7	(Uruguay) Ernesto Vargas		(substituted off) 71'
FW	9	(Uruguay) Juan Carlos de Lima
FW	11	(Uruguay) William Castro	(yellow card) 102'	(substituted off) 70'
Substitutes:
MF	14	(Uruguay) Héctor Morán	(yellow card) 87'	(substituted on) 71'
FW	15	(Uruguay) José Daniel Carreño		(substituted on) 113'
Manager:
(Uruguay) Roberto Fleitas

Assistant Referees:
Kil Ki-Chul (South Korea)
Masahiro Sogawa (Japan)

== See also ==
- 1987–88 European Cup
- 1988 Copa Libertadores
- PSV Eindhoven in European football
