= Cardaccio =

Cardaccio is a surname. Notable people with the surname include:

- Alberto Cardaccio (1949–2015), Uruguayan footballer
- Jorge Daniel Cardaccio (born 1959), Uruguayan footballer
- Mathías Cardaccio (born 1987), Uruguayan footballer
