= Sebastião Lazaroni =

Brazilian football manager

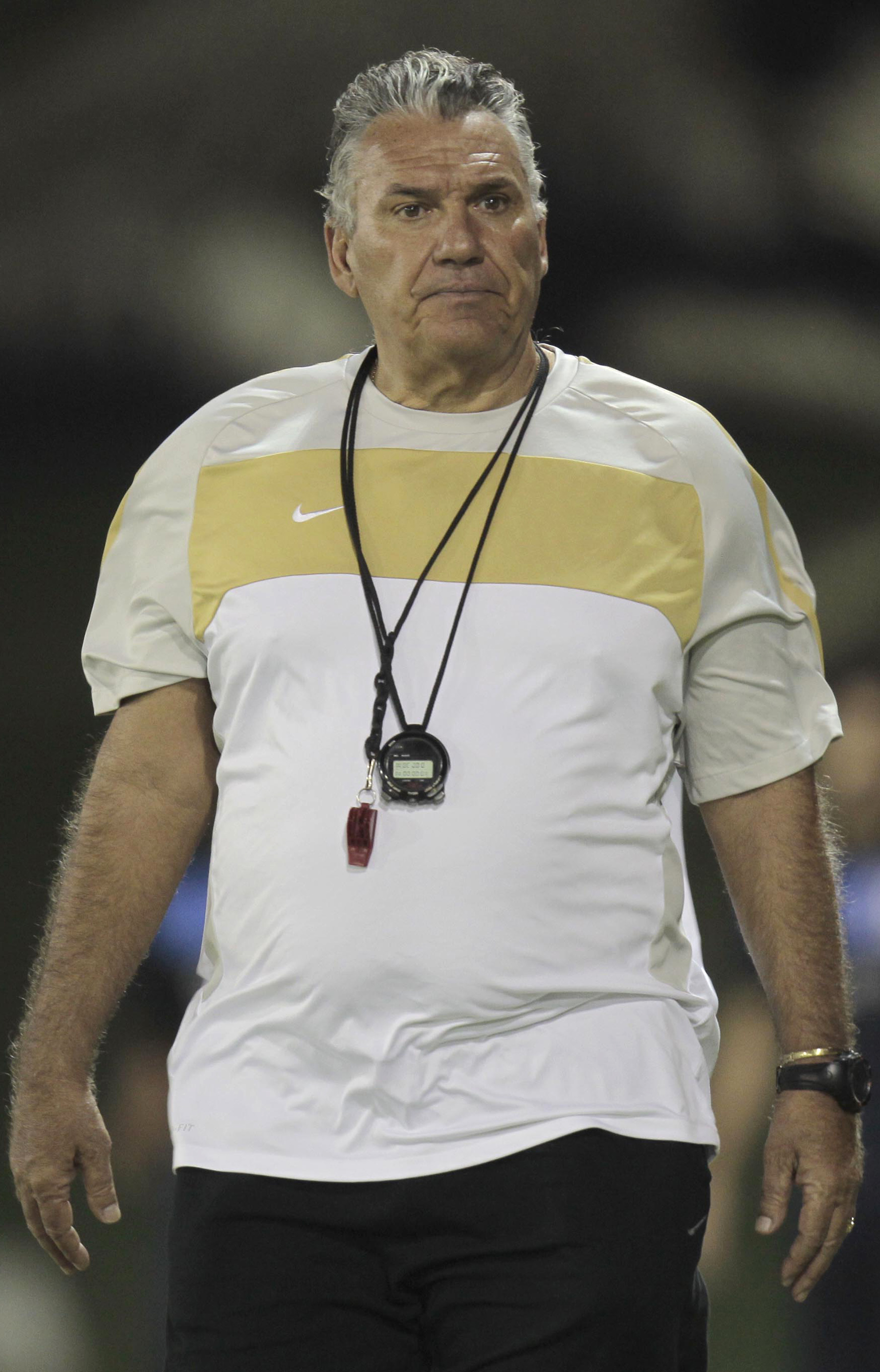
- Lazaroni as manager of the Qatar national team in 2011

Personal information
- Full name: Sebastião Barroso Lazaroni
- Date of birth: 25 September 1950 (age 76)
- Place of birth: Muriaé, Brazil

Managerial career
- Years: Team
- 1984–1986: Flamengo
- 1987–1988: Vasco da Gama
- 1988: Al-Ahli
- 1988: Grêmio
- 1989: Paraná
- 1989–1990: Brazil
- 1990–1991: Fiorentina
- 1992: Al-Hilal
- 1992–1993: Bari
- 1993–1994: León
- 1994: Vasco da Gama
- 1996: Paraná
- 1996–1997: Fenerbahçe
- 1999: Shanghai Shenhua
- 2000: Jamaica
- 2000–2001: Botafogo
- 2001–2002: Yokohama F. Marinos
- 2003–2004: Al Arabi
- 2004–2005: Jamaica
- 2005: Juventude
- 2006: Trabzonspor
- 2007–2008: Marítimo
- 2008–2011: Qatar SC
- 2011–2012: Qatar
- 2012–2014: Qatar SC
- 2015–2016: Qatar SC

Sebastião Barroso Lazaroni, (born 25 September 1950) is a Brazilian football manager who last coached Qatar Stars League club Qatar SC. He was born in Muriaé, Minas Gerais state.

He is well known in Brazil as the manager who tried to introduce the libero position in Brazilian football. He used the 3–5–2 scheme during the 1990 FIFA World Cup, but it was a failure, and Brazil was eliminated in the second round by Argentina.

When he was the Brazil national team head coach, in 35 matches, he won 21, drew seven and lost seven.

He helped Brazil win the South American Championship in 1989, the team's first Copa América title in 39 years.

He is also known for his being the head coach of Turkish club Fenerbahçe that ended the 40-year undefeated European home record of Manchester United in the UEFA Champions' League match in 1996.

He took over the Qatar national team on 1 August 2011 as a replacement for Milovan Rajevac, but was ultimately fired four months later as a result of the team's unimpressive performances. The QFA highlighted his failure to advance past the group stage of the 2011 Pan Arab Games, which Qatar had hosted, as a main cause of his sacking. His record with the team ended with two wins, five draws and two losses. He was officially sacked on 3 January 2012 after his contract was released by QFA.

Lazaroni was last in charge of Qatar SC for the third time in his career following spells with the Doha based club between 2008 and 2011 and 2012 and 2014. His third spell ended in disappointment and he was dismissed in May 2016 after the club's relegation from Qatar Stars League.

== Managerial statistics ==
As of 7 March 2026

Managerial record by team and tenure
Team	Nat	From	To	Record							
Team	Nat	From	To	G	W	D	L	GF	GA	GD	Win %
Flamengo	(Brazil)	3 August 1985	30 March 1987	74	39	20	15	106	50	+56	52.70
Guarani	(Brazil)	30 May 1987	25 June 1987	8	1	4	3	6	10	−4	12.50
Vasco da Gama	(Brazil)	29 June 1987	26 June 1988	47	29	7	11	72	36	+36	61.70
Al-Ahli	(Saudi Arabia)	1 July 1988	15 January 1989	17	10	5	2	26	10	+16	58.82
Brazil	(Brazil)	1 January 1989	30 June 1990	30	19	6	5	49	18	+31	63.33
Fiorentina	(Italy)	1 July 1990	6 October 1991	48	15	18	15	56	45	+11	31.25
Al-Hilal	(Saudi Arabia)	1 January 1992	30 January 1992	14	6	4	4	17	10	+7	42.86
Bari	(Italy)	1 July 1992	11 January 1993	21	7	6	8	25	29	−4	33.33
Vasco da Gama	(Brazil)	28 May 1994	12 December 1994	30	11	9	10	34	32	+2	36.67
Paraná	(Brazil)	28 March 1996	20 May 1996	9	4	2	3	15	12	+3	44.44
Paraná	(Brazil)	10 June 1997	22 September 1997	18	6	5	7	22	22	+0	33.33
Grêmio	(Brazil)	28 November 1997	10 May 1998	20	10	4	6	28	15	+13	50.00
Shanghai Shenhua	(China)	1 January 1999	31 December 1999	34	15	11	8	44	32	+12	44.12
Jamaica	(Jamaica)	29 February 2000	30 June 2000	4	0	0	4	0	7	−7	0.00
Yokohama Marinos	(Japan)	1 August 2001	14 October 2002	57	29	12	16	74	51	+23	50.88
Al-Arabi	(Kuwait)	1 July 2003	30 June 2004	30	17	6	7	57	29	+28	56.67
Jamaica	(Jamaica)	31 July 2004	31 October 2004	6	1	4	1	8	6	+2	16.67
Juventude	(Brazil)	28 July 2006	18 October 2006	18	4	4	10	20	30	−10	22.22
Trabzonspor	(Turkey)	1 July 2006	7 September 2006	6	2	2	2	5	5	+0	33.33
Marítimo	(Portugal)	1 July 2007	30 June 2008	33	15	5	13	41	30	+11	45.45
Qatar SC	(Qatar)	24 July 2008	11 August 2011	93	45	26	22	157	113	+44	48.39
Qatar	(Qatar)	9 August 2011	20 December 2011	6	2	3	1	8	4	+4	33.33
Qatar SC	(Qatar)	9 July 2012	1 June 2014	70	24	17	29	102	107	−5	34.29
Qatar SC	(Qatar)	26 October 2015	27 June 2016	21	6	8	7	26	36	−10	28.57
Career total				714	317	188	209	998	739	+259	44.40

== Honours ==
=== Club ===
Flamengo

- Campeonato Carioca: 1986

Vasco da Gama

- Campeonato Carioca: 1987, 1988

Al-Hilal

- Saudi Crown Prince Cup: 1995

Yokohama Marinos

- J.League Cup: 2002

Qatar SC

- Qatar Crown Prince Cup: 2009
- Qatari Stars Cup: 2014

Shanghai Shenhua

- FA Super Cup: 1999

=== International ===
Brazil

- Copa América: 1989

=== Individual ===
- South American Coach of the Year: 1989
- Qatar Coach of the Year: 2009

Preceded by Roberto Fleitas	South American Coach of the Year; 1989	Succeeded by Luis Alberto Cubilla
