= Gustavo Costas =

Argentine former footballer and football manager

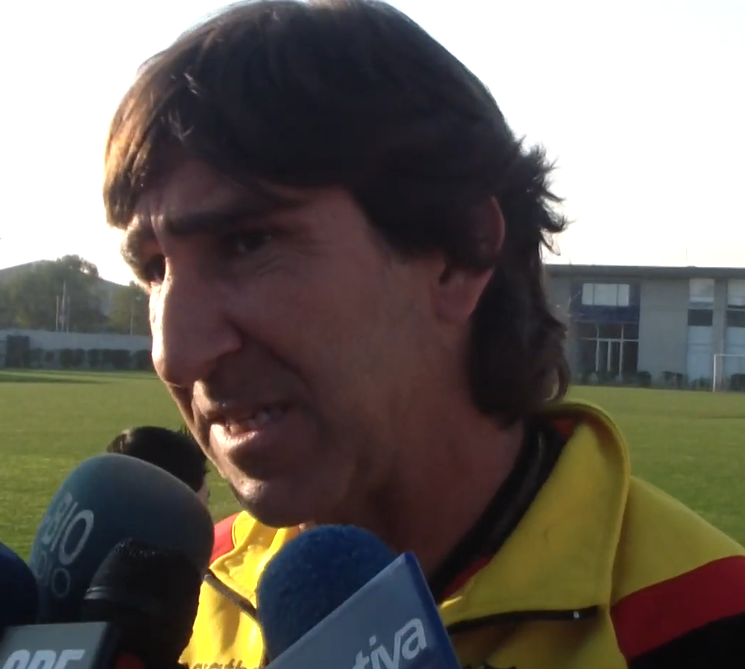
- Costas in 2012

Personal information
- Full name: Gustavo Adolfo Costas Makeira
- Date of birth: 28 February 1963 (age 63)
- Place of birth: Buenos Aires, Argentina
- Height: 1.84 m (6 ft 0 in)
- Position: Centre-back

Team information
- Current team: Cerro Porteño (manager)

Youth career
- Racing Club

Senior career*
Years	Team	Apps	(Gls)
1981–1989	Racing Club		
1989–1992	Locarno	45	(3)
1992–1996	Racing Club		
1996–1997	Gimnasia de Jujuy	34	(1)

Managerial career
- 1998–1999: Racing Club (youth)
- 1999–2000: Racing Club
- 2001–2003: Guaraní
- 2003–2004: Alianza Lima
- 2005–2006: Cerro Porteño
- 2007: Racing Club
- 2008: Olimpia
- 2009–2011: Alianza Lima
- 2011: Al Nassr
- 2012–2013: Barcelona SC
- 2014–2015: Santa Fe
- 2016: Atlas
- 2016–2017: Santa Fe
- 2017–2018: Al-Fayha
- 2019–2021: Guaraní
- 2022: Palestino
- 2022–2023: Bolivia
- 2024–2026: Racing Club
- 2026–: Cerro Porteño
- * Club domestic league appearances and goals

Gustavo Adolfo Costas Makeira (born 28 February 1963) is an Argentine football manager and former player who played as a centre-back. He is the current manager of Paraguayan club Cerro Porteño.

Costas' career is mainly linked to Racing Club, where he played for twelve seasons in two different spells, and coached in three different spells. He has also coached in Paraguay, Peru, Saudi Arabia, Ecuador, Colombia, Mexico, Chile and Bolivia.

== Playing career ==
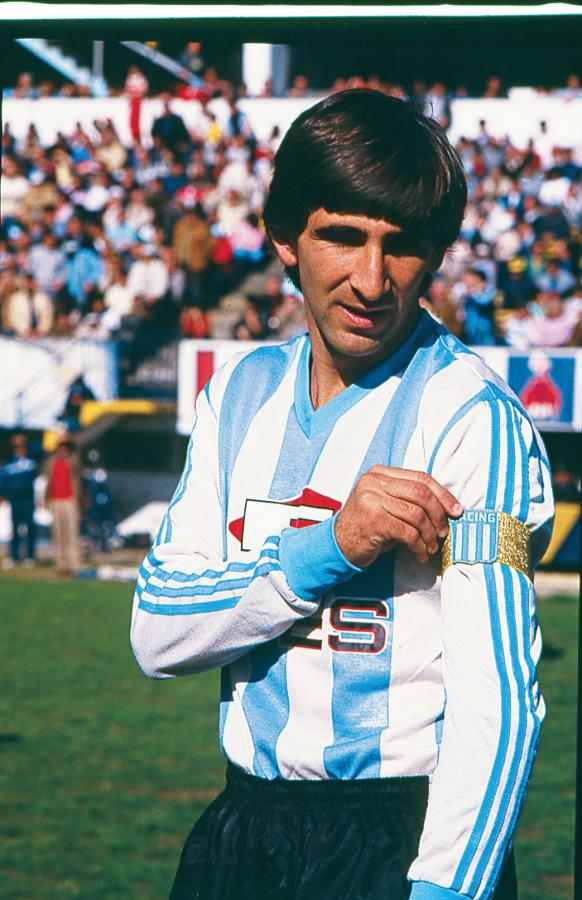
Costas with Racing Club in 1986

Born in Buenos Aires, Costas was a Racing Club youth graduate. After making his first team debut in 1981, he saw the club's first-ever relegation from the Primera División from the stands, as he was nursing a knee injury.

Costas became a key part of the team that won promotion back to the top tier in 1985, acting as team captain. He later helped La Academia to win the 1988 Supercopa Libertadores, their first major title in 21 years, they then went on to win the less prestigious Supercopa Interamaricana.

Costas moved abroad in 1989, joining Swiss team Locarno. He returned to Racing in 1992, playing for four seasons before moving to Gimnasia de Jujuy in 1996, where he played until his retirement in 1997 at the age of 34.

Costas played 337 matches for Racing, scoring nine goals. He became the footballer with the most appearances for the club in the professional era, and the second of their entire history (only behind Natalio Perinetti's 407 matches in the amateur era).

== Managerial career ==
=== Early career ===
After retiring, Costas joined the youth categories of his main club Racing, before being named manager of the first team along with Humberto Maschio on 17 December 1998. The duo left on 23 May 2000, after a 3–0 loss to Lanús.

On 1 July 2001, Costas moved to Paraguay after being named manager of Guaraní. On 9 April 2003, after having altercations with the club's vice-president Juan Alberto Acosta, he resigned.

=== Alianza Lima ===
Shortly after leaving Guaraní, Costas was presented at Peruvian side Alianza Lima on 18 April 2003. He immediately led them to success in the 2003 Clausura, and then saw his team win the Primera División Peruana final against Sporting Cristal.

In 2004, Costas led Alianza to the Apertura 2004 title and another chance to win the final of the Primera División where they again defeated Sporting Cristal, this time 5–4 on penalties.

=== Cerro Porteño ===
Costas left Alianza in December 2004 to return to Paraguay, where he took over Cerro Porteño. Under his leadership the club won both the Apertura and Clausura in 2005 to be crowned undisputed national champions.

Costas resigned from Cerro on 24 April 2007, after disagreeing with an interview from club president Luis Pettengill.

=== Racing Club return ===
On 27 April 2007, Costas agreed to return to Racing Club for his second spell in charge of La Academia. He was sacked on 2 December, after a poor Apertura overall.

=== Olimpia ===
On 12 December 2007, Costas signed a two-year contract to manage Olimpia back in Paraguay. The following 29 August, after a 4–0 loss to Universidad Católica, he was dismissed.

=== Alianza Lima return ===
On 19 December 2008, Costas agreed to return to Alianza Lima on a two-year contract. He led the club to the 2009 Torneo Descentralizado finals, losing to Universitario.

=== Al Nassr ===
On 18 July 2011, Costas resigned from Alianza to sign for Al Nassr from Saudi Arabia. He was dismissed on 30 November, with the club sitting 6th in the league table.

=== Barcelona SC ===
On 11 April 2012, Costas switched teams and countries again, after being announced as manager of Ecuadorian side Barcelona SC on a one-year deal. He won the first stage which secured Barcelona a spot to the 2012 Copa Sudamericana, 2013 Copa Libertadores and the third stage of the Ecuadorian Serie A. On 2 December, Barcelona won the second stage, automatically becoming the champion of the 2012 Ecuadorian Serie A.

On 6 December 2012, Costas extended his contract with Barcelona until December 2013. He departed on 12 August 2013, after a poor run of results.

=== Santa Fe ===
On 16 May 2014, after nearly one year without a club, Costas was appointed manager of Colombian club Independiente Santa Fe. He led the club to the 2014 Finalización title, but resigned the following 30 May, after elimination from the 2015 Copa Libertadores.

=== Atlas ===
On 27 November 2015, Costas replaced Gustavo Matosas at the helm of Liga MX side Atlas. He was sacked the following 27 April, two matches before the end of the 2016 Clausura tournament.

=== Santa Fe return ===
On 21 July 2016, Santa Fe announced the return of Costas as manager. He won the 2016 Suruga Bank Championship and the 2016 Finalización titles, aside from also lifting the 2017 Superliga Colombiana.

Costas resigned from Santa Fe on 9 June 2017, after a poor 2017 Apertura.

=== Al-Fayha ===
On 1 November 2017, Costas replaced Constantin Gâlcă as manager of Al-Fayha back in Saudi Arabia. He was sacked on 15 October of the following year, with the club in the relegation zone.

=== Guaraní return ===
On 6 June 2019, Costas agreed to return to Guaraní after 16 years, being presented four days later. He left by mutual consent on 28 May 2021, after a poor 2021 Apertura tournament.

=== Palestino ===
On 20 December 2021, Costas replaced compatriot Patricio Graff as manager of Chilean club Palestino.

=== Bolivia national team ===
On 19 August 2022, Costas confirmed as manager of the Bolivia national team, effective as the following November, once his season with Palestino ended. On 23 October 2023, after a poor start in the 2026 FIFA World Cup qualifiers, he was sacked.

=== Third spell at Racing ===
On 15 December 2023, Costas was officially announced as manager of Racing for his third spell. On 24 November 2024, he won the year's Copa Sudamericana with the club, their first international title in 36 years. On 27 February 2025, he led the team to win their first Recopa Sudamericana, winning against Botafogo, which was 2024 Copa Libertadores champion.

== Managerial statistics ==
As of 18 October 2026

Managerial record by team and tenure
Team	Nat	From	To	Record							
Team	Nat	From	To	G	W	D	L	GF	GA	GD	Win %
Racing Club	(Argentina)	17 December 1999	23 May 2000	50	14	18	18	58	73	−15	28.00
Guaraní	(Paraguay)	1 July 2001	9 April 2003	62	25	12	25	93	94	−1	40.32
Alianza Lima	(Peru)	18 April 2003	11 December 2004	94	54	20	20	149	75	+74	57.45
Cerro Porteño	(Paraguay)	11 December 2004	24 April 2007	117	67	26	24	200	118	+82	57.26
Racing Club	(Argentina)	5 May 2007	4 December 2007	24	9	5	10	31	32	−1	37.50
Olimpia	(Paraguay)	1 January 2008	29 August 2008	29	9	6	14	34	45	−11	31.03
Alianza Lima	(Peru)	1 January 2009	17 July 2011	118	58	29	31	169	121	+48	49.15
Al Nassr	(Saudi Arabia)	18 July 2011	30 November 2011	10	4	2	4	14	16	−2	40.00
Barcelona SC	(Ecuador)	11 April 2012	12 August 2013	76	33	24	19	118	73	+45	43.42
Santa Fe	(Colombia)	16 May 2014	30 May 2015	75	41	16	18	112	66	+46	54.67
Atlas	(Mexico)	27 November 2015	27 April 2016	21	4	5	12	23	36	−13	19.05
Santa Fe	(Colombia)	21 July 2016	9 June 2017	60	25	20	15	73	65	+8	41.67
Al-Fayha	(Saudi Arabia)	6 November 2017	15 October 2018	25	10	7	8	37	41	−4	40.00
Guaraní	(Paraguay)	1 June 2019	14 June 2021	100	49	23	28	146	108	+38	49.00
Palestino	(Chile)	1 January 2022	13 November 2022	32	13	10	9	46	36	+10	40.63
Bolivia	(Bolivia)	14 November 2022	23 October 2023	10	1	1	8	5	17	−12	10.00
Racing Club	(Argentina)	15 December 2023	23 May 2026	135	70	25	40	210	120	+90	51.85
Cerro Porteño	(Paraguay)	28 August 2026	present	11	5	4	2	17	12	+5	45.45
Total				1,049	492	253	304	1,535	1,148	+387	46.90

== Honours ==
=== Player ===
Racing

- Supercopa Sudamericana: 1988
- Recopa Sudamericana runner-up: 1989

=== Manager ===
Alianza Lima

- Peruvian Primera División: 2003, 2004

Cerro Porteño

- Paraguayan Primera División: 2005

Barcelona

- Ecuadorian Serie A: 2012

Santa Fe

- Categoría Primera A: 2014 Finalización, 2016 Finalización
- Superliga Colombiana: 2015, 2017
- Suruga Bank Championship: 2016

Racing Club

- Copa Sudamericana: 2024
- Recopa Sudamericana: 2025

== See also ==
- List of football managers with the most matches
