= South American Coach of the Year =

Annual football award

The South American Coach of the Year (Spanish: Entrenador del año en Sudamérica) is an annual association football award presented to the best coach of a club or national team in South America over the previous calendar year. The award has been presented by Uruguayan newspaper El País since 1986.

The award goes to any coach/manager of a South American club or national team, regardless of the coaches' nationality. Argentine coaches have won the award the most, with 21 wins by 12 different coaches. With five awards, Argentine Carlos Bianchi is the most decorated awardee. The Argentina and Colombia national teams are the sides that produced most wins, with 5 each. The current recipient is Brazilian Filipe Luís, manager of Flamengo in 2025.

== Winners ==
Year	Coach	Team
1986	(Argentina) Carlos Bilardo	Argentina
1987	(Argentina) Carlos Bilardo	Argentina
1988	(Uruguay) Roberto Fleitas	(Uruguay) Nacional
1989	(Brazil) Sebastião Lazaroni	Brazil
1990	(Uruguay) Luis Cubilla	(Paraguay) Olimpia
1991	(Argentina) Alfio Basile	Argentina
1992	(Brazil) Telê Santana	(Brazil) São Paulo
1993	(Colombia) Francisco Maturana	Colombia
1994	(Argentina) Carlos Bianchi	(Argentina) Vélez Sarsfield
1995	(Uruguay) Héctor Núñez	Uruguay
1996	(Colombia) Hernán Darío Gómez	Colombia
1997	(Argentina) Daniel Passarella	Argentina
1998	(Argentina) Carlos Bianchi	(Argentina) Boca Juniors
1999	(Brazil) Luiz Felipe Scolari	(Brazil) Palmeiras
2000	(Argentina) Carlos Bianchi	(Argentina) Boca Juniors
2001	(Argentina) Carlos Bianchi	(Argentina) Boca Juniors
2002	(Brazil) Luiz Felipe Scolari	Brazil
2003	(Argentina) Carlos Bianchi	(Argentina) Boca Juniors
2004	(Colombia) Luis Fernando Montoya	(Colombia) Once Caldas
2005	(Uruguay) Aníbal Ruiz	Paraguay
2006	(Argentina) Claudio Borghi	(Chile) Colo-Colo
2007	(Argentina) Gerardo Martino	Paraguay
2008	(Argentina) Edgardo Bauza	(Ecuador) LDU Quito
2009	(Argentina) Marcelo Bielsa	Chile
2010	(Uruguay) Óscar Tabárez	Uruguay
2011	(Uruguay) Óscar Tabárez	Uruguay
2012	(Argentina) José Pékerman	Colombia
2013	(Argentina) José Pékerman	Colombia
2014	(Argentina) José Pékerman	Colombia
2015	(Argentina) Jorge Sampaoli	Chile
2016	(Colombia) Reinaldo Rueda	(Colombia) Atlético Nacional
2017	(Brazil) Tite	Brazil
2018	(Argentina) Marcelo Gallardo	(Argentina) River Plate
2019	(Argentina) Marcelo Gallardo	(Argentina) River Plate
2020	(Argentina) Marcelo Gallardo	(Argentina) River Plate
2021	(Portugal) Abel Ferreira	(Brazil) Palmeiras
2022	(Argentina) Lionel Scaloni	Argentina
2023	(Brazil) Fernando Diniz	Fluminense/Brazil (Note: Diniz served as a caretaker manager of Brazil while coaching Fluminense.)
2024	(Portugal) Artur Jorge	(Brazil) Botafogo
2025	(Brazil) Filipe Luís	(Brazil) Flamengo

== Wins by coach ==
Coach	Wins	Years
(Argentina) Carlos Bianchi	5	1994, 1998, 2000, 2001, 2003
(Argentina) José Pékerman	3	2012, 2013, 2014
(Argentina) Marcelo Gallardo	3	2018, 2019, 2020
(Argentina) Carlos Bilardo	2	1986, 1987
(Brazil) Luiz Felipe Scolari	2	1999, 2002
(Uruguay) Óscar Tabárez	2	2010, 2011

== Wins by nationality ==
Country	Coaches	Wins
Argentina	12	21
Brazil	6	7
Uruguay	5	6
Colombia	4	4
Portugal	2	2

== Wins by team ==
Team	Coaches	Wins
Argentina	4	5
Colombia	3	5
(Argentina) Boca Juniors	1	4
Brazil	4	4
Uruguay	2	3
(Argentina) River Plate	1	3
Chile	2	2
(Brazil) Palmeiras	2	2
Paraguay	2	2
(Colombia) Atlético Nacional	1	1
(Brazil) Botafogo	1	1
(Chile) Colo-Colo	1	1
(Brazil) Flamengo	1	1
(Brazil) Fluminense	1	1
(Ecuador) LDU Quito	1	1
(Uruguay) Nacional	1	1
(Paraguay) Olimpia	1	1
(Colombia) Once Caldas	1	1
(Brazil) São Paulo	1	1
(Argentina) Vélez Sarsfield	1	1
