= Luis Montoya =

Luis Montoya may refer to:

- Luis Fernando Montoya, Colombian football manager
- Luis Montoya (badminton), Mexican badminton player
