= Néstor Fabbri =

Argentine footballer (born 1968)

Personal information
- Full name: Néstor Ariel Fabbri
- Date of birth: 29 April 1968 (age 58)
- Place of birth: Buenos Aires, Argentina
- Height: 1.81 m (5 ft 11 in)
- Position: Defender

Youth career
- All Boys

Senior career*
Years	Team	Apps	(Gls)
1984–1985	All Boys	40	(15)
1986–1992	Racing Club	169	(6)
1992	América de Cali	29	(1)
1992–1993	Lanús	46	(4)
1994–1998	Boca Juniors	117	(13)
1998–2002	Nantes	116	(9)
2002–2003	Guingamp	33	(1)
2003–2004	Estudiantes	26	(1)
2004–2005	All Boys	18	(3)
Total		594	(53)

International career
1987–1997	Argentina	22	(2)
- * Club domestic league appearances and goals

Néstor Ariel Fabbri (born 29 April 1968) is an Argentine former professional footballer who played as a defender.

== Career ==
Fabbri started playing at the young division of All Boys in 1984, he made his debut for the first team during the 1984–85 season in the Argentine 2nd division. In 1986, he joined first division Racing Club. In 1987 Fabbri was named Player of the Year of Argentina.

After six seasons with Racing, Fabbri spent the 1992 season with Colombian América de Cali, and the 1993 season back to Argentina for Club Atlético Lanús, before moving to Boca Juniors in 1994. Fabbri played with Boca until 1998, when he was transferred to French first division Nantes. With Nantes Fabbri won the 1999 and 2000 French Cups, the 1999 and 2001 Champion's Trophies, and the 2001 French Championship.

In 2002, Fabbri moved to Guingamp, at that time in the French first division. He played one season for Guingamp with teammates like Didier Drogba or Florent Malouda and the team finished in seventh place. He returned to Argentina, first to play for Estudiantes in 2003, and then in 2004 to his first team All Boys, where he retired.

With the Argentina national football team, "La Tota" Fabbri played 21 matches, including the 1990 FIFA World Cup, and scored 1 goal.

== Personal life ==
Fabbri worked as an agent for his nephew Jonathan Calleri, who plays as a forward for Brazilian club São Paulo.

== Honours ==
Racing

- Supercopa Libertadores: 1988
- Recopa Sudamericana runner-up: 1989

América de Cali

- Categoría Primera A: 1992

Nantes

- Ligue 1: 2000–01
- Coupe de France: 1998–99, 1999–2000
- Trophée des Champions: 1999, 2001

Argentina Youth

- South American Games: 1986

Argentina

- FIFA World Cup runner-up: 1990
- FIFA Confederations Cup runner-up: 1995

Individual

- Footballer of the Year of Argentina: 1987
