= Aníbal Ruiz =

Uruguayan footballer and coach (1942-2017)

Personal information
- Full name: Aníbal Ruiz Leites
- Date of birth: 30 December 1942
- Place of birth: Salto, Uruguay
- Date of death: 10 March 2017 (aged 74)
- Place of death: Veracruz, Veracruz, Mexico
- Position: Midfielder

Senior career*
Years	Team	Apps	(Gls)
1962–1963	Danubio		
1964–1966	Sud América		
1966–1968	Cúcuta Deportivo		
1969–1970	Deportivo Anzoátegui		
1971	Montevideo Wanderers		
1972	Unión Tumán		
1972–1974	Montevideo Wanderers		
1975	Ramonense		
1976	Miramar Misiones		

Managerial career
- 1976: Nacional (assistant)
- 1977: Danubio (assistant)
- 1978: Defensor Sporting (assistant)
- 1979: Olimpia (assistant)
- 1980: Newell's Old Boys (assistant)
- 1981: Peñarol (assistant)
- 1982: Olimpia (assistant)
- 1983: Atlético Nacional (assistant)
- 1984: River Plate Montevideo
- 1985: Olimpia
- 1986: Atlético Nacional
- 1987: Olimpia
- 1988: Montevideo Wanderers
- 1989–1990: Necaxa
- 1991: Deportivo Quito
- 1991: Olimpia
- 1992: El Salvador
- 1992–1993: UAG
- 1993–1996: Veracruz
- 1996–1997: Puebla
- 1997–1998: León
- 1998–2000: UAT
- 2000–2001: Guaraní
- 2001: Olimpia
- 2002–2006: Paraguay
- 2006: Veracruz
- 2008: Emelec
- 2008: Cúcuta Deportivo
- 2010–2011: Universidad San Martín
- 2012: León de Huánuco
- 2013: Universidad San Martín
- 2014: Municipal
- 2015: Toluca (assistant)
- 2016: Chiapas (assistant)
- 2017: Puebla (assistant)
- * Club domestic league appearances and goals

Aníbal Ruiz Leites (30 December 1942 – 10 March 2017) was a Uruguayan association football coach.

== Death ==
On March 10, 2017, while serving as assistant manager to lead manager José Cardozo at Puebla, Ruiz collapsed on the pitch of the Luis "Pirata" Fuente Stadium in Veracruz while the team was warming up. Ruiz later died as a result of a heart attack on the way to a local hospital.

Preceded by Luis Fernando Montoya	South American Coach of the Year; 2005	Succeeded by Claudio Borghi
