= Julio César Balerio =

Uruguayan-Peruvian footballer and manager (1958–2013)

Personal information
- Full name: Julio César Balerio Correa
- Date of birth: 19 April 1958
- Place of birth: Piriápolis, Uruguay
- Date of death: 24 June 2013 (aged 55)
- Place of death: Montevideo, Uruguay
- Height: 1.87 m (6 ft 2 in)
- Position: Goalkeeper

Senior career*
| Years | Team | Apps | (Gls) |
| 1980–1981 | Rentistas | | |
| 1982–1983 | Bella Vista | | |
| 1984–1986 | Boca Juniors | 37 | (0) |
| 1986–1989 | Racing Club | 32 | (0) |
| 1990–1992 | Club Blooming | | |
| 1993 | Deportivo Sipesa | | |
| 1994–1998 | Sporting Cristal | | |

International career
| 1996–1997 | Peru | 17 | (0) |

Managerial career
- 2003–?: Rentistas
- 2005–2006: Cerro
- 2006–2007: Rentistas
- 2008: Juan Aurich
- 2009–2010: Cerrito
- 2011: Rentistas
- 2013: Atenas
- * Club domestic league appearances and goals

Julio César Balerio Correa (19 April 1958 – 24 June 2013), nicknamed El Viejo (The Old Man), was a Uruguayan-Peruvian football player and manager.

== Club career ==
Balerio made his debut in the Uruguayan First Division in 1980 with C.A. Rentistas, before moving to C.A. Bella Vista in 1982.

His played in Argentina with Boca Juniors (1984–1986) and Racing Club (1986–1989), with whom he won both the Supercopa Libertadores and the Supercopa Interamericana in 1988. He also played for Club Blooming in Bolivia in the early 1990s before arriving in Peru in 1993 with the modest Deportivo Sipesa, where he reached the quarterfinals of the Copa CONMEBOL.

With Sporting Cristal (1994–1998) that he achieved his greatest success, winning three consecutive Peruvian championships in 1994, 1995 and 1996. He also led his team to the final of the 1997 Copa Libertadores. He ended his playing career with Sporting Cristal in 1998.

== International career ==
Having become a Peruvian citizen in 1996, Balerio was called up by coach Juan Carlos Oblitas for the 1998 World Cup qualifiers. He played 17 games for the Peruvian national team between 1996 and 1997 (conceding 15 goals).

== Managerial career ==
Balerio mainly managed in his native country. He won the Uruguayan 2nd division championship twice, in 2003 and 2011, with Rentistas. In Peru he coached Juan Aurich in 2008.

== Death ==
Balerio died of a heart attack on 24 June 2013 in Montevideo. He was 55 years old.

== Honours ==
=== Player ===
Racing Club (Avellaneda)

- Supercopa Libertadores: 1988
- Supercopa Interamericana: 1988

Sporting Cristal

- Torneo Descentralizado: 1994, 1995, 1996

=== Manager ===
C.A. Rentistas

- Uruguayan Segunda División: 2003, 2011
