= Mathías Cardaccio =

Uruguayan footballer (born 1987)

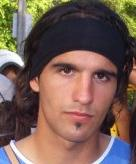

Personal information
- Full name: Mathías Adolfo Cardaccio Alaguich
- Date of birth: 2 October 1987 (age 39)
- Place of birth: Montevideo, Uruguay
- Height: 1.75 m (5 ft 9 in)
- Position: Midfielder

Senior career*
Years	Team	Apps	(Gls)
2007–2008	Nacional	25	(1)
2008–2009	Milan	1	(0)
2010	Banfield	13	(0)
2010–2011	Atlante	19	(1)
2012	Londrina	4	(0)
2012–2013	Asteras Tripolis	7	(0)
2013	Colo-Colo	0	(0)
2013	Colo-Colo B	5	(2)
2013–2016	Defensor Sporting	31	(1)
2016–2017	Sinaloa	13	(0)
2017–2018	Defensor Sporting	61	(1)
2019	Nacional	20	(1)
2020–2021	Defensor Sporting	39	(3)

International career
2007	Uruguay U20	8	(0)
2008	Uruguay	1	(0)
- * Club domestic league appearances and goals as of 13:21, 24 January 2022 (UTC)

Mathías Adolfo Cardaccio Alaguich (born 2 October 1987) is an Uruguayan former footballer who played as a midfielder who is the coordinator of football of Liga MX club Cruz Azul.

== Career ==
=== Club career ===
Cardaccio began his playing career with Club Nacional de Football in Uruguay. His most famous goal for the club came in a 3–1 win against Cienciano that allowed Nacional to progress to the knockout stages of Copa Libertadores 2008. His talent did not go unnoticed and he was signed by AC Milan on a 4-year contract.

Cardaccio made his competitive debut for Milan in a 1–2 Coppa Italia loss to Lazio on 3 December 2008. He made his debut in Serie A on 26 April 2009, in Milan 3–0 win over Palermo, which later proved to be his only appearance with the rossoneri'. On 28 August 2009 Milan announced to have released Cardaccio and fellow Uruguayan Tabaré Viudez by mutual consent.

His next club were Defensor Sporting Club back in Uruguay but on 29 January 2010 he was loaned to Banfield from Defensor Sporting, who had signed him on a free transfer during summer 2009.

In 2010, he joined Mexican side Atlante.

Chilean side Colo Colo reached an agreement to sign Cardaccio from his Greek club Asteras Tripolis in February 2013.

=== International career ===
In 2007 Cardaccio took part in the FIFA U-20 World Cup with Uruguay. There he scored an own goal in a match against the United States.

== Personal life ==
Mathías is the nephew of former Uruguayan player Jorge Daniel Cardaccio, who also played for Nacional. His sister, Belén, is a former Uruguay international footballer.
