= Arnaldo Cézar Coelho =

Brazilian football referee (born 1943)

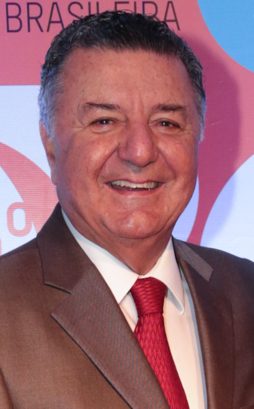
- Born: 15 January 1943 (age 83); Rio de Janeiro, Brazil
- Other occupation: Sports commentator in TV; businessman

International
Years	League	Role
1968-1982	FIFA-listed	Referee

Arnaldo David Cézar Coelho (born 15 January 1943) is a former football referee. He is notably the first non-European referee to take charge of the FIFA World Cup final, as he officiated in the 1982 final between Italy and West Germany. Along with compatriot Romualdo Arppi Filho, he is one of only two referees to have officiated both Copa América and FIFA World Cup final matches.

== Career ==
Coelho's career began as a beach soccer referee; he became professional in 1965 (at one time, famously, telling reporters that he was the highest paid match official in the world) and was appointed to the international list in 1968. He was selected for both the 1978 and 1982 FIFA World Cups, in Argentina and Spain respectively. In total, he officiated in seven matches during the World Cup finals, three as a referee (including the aforementioned final from the 1982 edition of the tournament, in which Italy defeated West Germany 3–1 at the Santiago Bernabéu Stadium in Madrid).

Throughout his career he also officiated the 1979 Copa América final play-off between Chile and Paraguay, as well as the second leg of the 1988 Copa Libertadores finals between Nacional and Newell's Old Boys. as well as

== After retirement ==
After the end of his refereeing career, he became a football TV commentator for Rede Globo until 2018.

== Legacy ==
In 2009, The Times listed Coelho in seventh place in its list of "top ten football referees".

== Personal life ==
Coelho's brother is Ronaldo Cezar Coelho, a representative and founder of the Social Democratic Party in Brazil (PSDB); his mother is from a Moroccan Jewish family.

== Major matches refereed ==
Date	Match	Tournament	Venue	Result	Ref
11 December 1979	Chile vs. Paraguay	1979 Copa América final (play-off)	José Amalfitani Stadium, Buenos Aires	0–0 (a.e.t.) (2–2 on points; a play-off on neutral ground was required to determine the winner. After the play-off finished tied 0–0, Paraguay won 3–1 on aggregate goals, having won the first leg 3–0, and having lost the second leg 1–0.)	
11 July 1982	Italy vs. West Germany	1982 FIFA World Cup final	Santiago Bernabéu Stadium, Madrid	3–1	
26 October 1988	Nacional vs. Newell's Old Boys	1988 Copa Libertadores finals (second leg)	Estadio Centenario, Montevideo	3–0 (3–1 on aggregate)	

== See also ==
- List of Jews in sports (non-players)

Sporting positions (Brazil) Arnaldo Cézar Coelho
Preceded by 1978 FIFA World Cup Final (Italy) Sergio Gonella	1982 FIFA World Cup Final Referee	Succeeded by 1986 FIFA World Cup Final (Brazil) Romualdo Arppi Filho
