= Jorge Pautasso =

Argentine footballer and coach

Personal information
- Full name: Jorge Remigio Pautasso
- Date of birth: 13 February 1962 (age 64)
- Place of birth: Rafaela, Argentina
- Position: Centre back

Senior career*
Years	Team	Apps	(Gls)
1980–1991	Newell´s Old Boys		
1991	Antofagasta		
1992	Deportes Temuco		
1992–1994	Estudiantes de San Luis		
1994	Central Córdoba		

Managerial career
- 1998: Almirante Brown (assistant)
- 1998–2000: Platense (assistant)
- 2000–2001: Instituto (assistant)
- 2002–2003: Libertad (assistant)
- 2004: Cerro Porteño (assistant)
- 2005: Colón (assistant)
- 2006: Libertad (assistant)
- 2006–2011: Paraguay (assistant)
- 2012–2013: Newell´s Old Boys (assistant)
- 2013–2014: Barcelona (assistant)
- 2014–2016: Argentina (assistant)
- 2017–2018: Deportivo Cali (assistant)
- 2019: Melgar
- 2020: FC Juárez (assistant)
- 2022: Carlos A. Mannucci
- * Club domestic league appearances and goals

Jorge Remigio Pautasso (born 13 February 1962) is an Argentine football manager and former player who played as a central defender.

== Football career ==
Born in Rafaela, Pautasso began his playing career in the Primera División with Newell's Old Boys in 1980, where he played as a defender. With a total of 282 capitals, Jorge has played the most games in the history of the club. There, he obtained two professional titles in Argentinian soccer, the season 1987–88, under the technical direction of José Yudica, and the Apertura 1990, under the technical direction of Marcelo Bielsa. He also received great referents for the Rosario club such as "El Tata" Martino, Roberto Sensini, and Scoponi, among others. In 1988, he participated in the team that was left runner-up of the Copa Libertadores of America, where they lost the final against the nation of Uruguay. Then, after remaining on the bench, he changed to Chilean football. In 1991, he was signed by the Antofagasta. A year later, in 1992, he was a member of the Club de Deportes Temuco squad, and in 1993 he was signed by Estudiantes de San Luis, where he played only one year. In 1994, he returned to Rosario to form part of the team of Central Córdoba of the same city. There, he completed his career at the end of 1996 at 34 years of age.

== As part of the technical staff ==
After his retirement as a player, he returned again to the club known as Newell's Old Boys, but this time to manage the minor divisions, along with Jorge Theiler and Jorge Bernardo Griffa, who was a general coordinator of the lower divisions. In 1995, debuting as part of a coaching staff, he led the fourth division of Asociación Rosarina de Fútbol. From 1996, he directed the seventh, eighth and then the ninth division of the Asociación de Fútbol Argentino.

In 1998, he was called by Gerardo Martino, along with Jorge Theiler, to participate in what would be the debut of "Tata" as coach in the Brown de Arrecifes. From this moment on, he always followed Martino. Soon, they would happen to be part of the technical staff of Platense in 1999 and Instituto de Córdoba in the year 2000.

In 2002 migrate to Paraguay to manage the Club Libertad, which would be a champion in the Torneo Apertura 2002, Torneo Clausura 2002, Torneo Apertura 2003 and Torneo Absoluto 2003.

At the end of 2003, he was hired by Cerro Porteño, where he won the Apertura and Clausura 2004 tournaments.

He returned to Argentina in 2005 to manage of Colón de Santa Fe, and a year later he would return to Paraguay, to the Club Libertad, where they would win the Apertura and Clausura 2006 and reach the semifinals of the Copa Libertadores that year.

Then manage the Selección de fútbol de Paraguay in 2007; after qualifying in the South American qualifiers, that selection would classify first in the Group F of the World Cup 2010. Then, it was eliminated by Spain in the stage of quarters finals, This is the first time that Paraguay reached that position. In 2011, the Copa America play the final, an edition that was held in Argentina.

In 2012, he accompanied Tata on his return to Newell's, and they were champions of the 2013 Final Tournament. In that same season, they reached the semifinal of the Copa Libertadores.

In July 2013, they are hide by F.C Barcelona as part of the coaching staff. On their arrival, they managed to win the Spanish Super Cup by beating Atlético de Madrid. They reach the final of the Copa del Rey versus Real Madrid and were in second place of the 2013/2014 league behind Atletico Madrid.

Between 2014 and 2016, he worked as a second coach in the Argentine Soccer Team. In the Copa America of 2015 in Chile, they reach the final against the local. The following year in Copa America Centenario, which was in the United States, they also reached the final.

In March 2017, he joined the technical staff of Hector Cárdenas (Colombian) in Deportivo Cali (Colombia), where he reach the final in the 2017 Aguila I Tournament and reached the semifinal of the Colombia Cup 2017.

== Career ==
=== As a player ===
Team	County	Year
Newell's Old Boys	Argentina	1980 - 1990
Deportes Antofagasta	Chile	1991
Deportes Temuco	Chile	1992
Estudiantes de San Luis	Argentina	1993
Central Córdoba	Argentina	1994

=== Titles as a player ===
Title	Team	Country
Campeonato 1987-88	Newell's Old Boys	Argentina
Campeonato 1990-91	Newell's Old Boys	Argentina
