= Caldas, Antioquia =

- Municipality and town
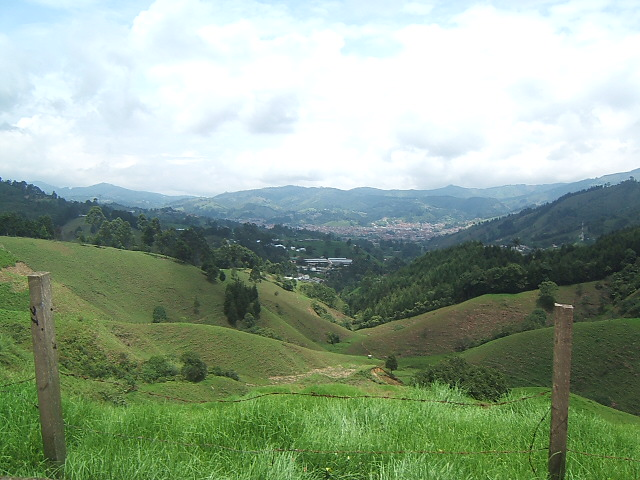

- Flag Coat of arms

- Location of the municipality and town of Caldas, Antioquia in the Antioquia Department of Colombia

- Location in Colombia
- Coordinates: 06°05′24″N 75°38′15″W
- Country: Colombia
- Department: Antioquia Department
- Founded: 1840

Government
  - Mayor: Mauricio Cano Carmona

Area
  - Municipality and town: 132.8 km^{2} (51.3 sq mi)
  - Urban: 3.98 km^{2} (1.54 sq mi)
- Elevation: 1,750 m (5,740 ft)

Population (2020 est.)
  - Municipality and town: 83,423
  - Density: 628.2/km^{2} (1,627/sq mi)
  - Urban: 67,400
  - Urban density: 16,900/km^{2} (43,900/sq mi)
- Demonym: Caldeño
- Time zone: UTC-5 (Colombia Standard Time)
- Area code: 57 + 4
- Website: Official website (in Spanish)

Caldas is a town and municipality in Antioquia Department, Colombia. Caldas is part of The Metropolitan Area of Medellín. It is the seat of the Roman Catholic Diocese of Caldas. The population was estimated to be 83,423 in 2020. It is located in the city of Medellín, 30 minutes away.

== Climate ==
Caldas has a subtropical highland climate (Cfb) with abundant rainfall year-round.

Climate data for Caldas (Salada La), elevation 1,680 m (5,510 ft), (1981–2010)
Month	Jan	Feb	Mar	Apr	May	Jun	Jul	Aug	Sep	Oct	Nov	Dec	Year
Mean daily maximum °C (°F)	23.5 (74.3)	23.9 (75.0)	23.7 (74.7)	23.2 (73.8)	23.2 (73.8)	23.3 (73.9)	23.7 (74.7)	23.7 (74.7)	23.1 (73.6)	22.8 (73.0)	22.6 (72.7)	22.8 (73.0)	23.3 (73.9)
Daily mean °C (°F)	18.4 (65.1)	18.6 (65.5)	18.4 (65.1)	18.2 (64.8)	18.3 (64.9)	18.5 (65.3)	18.6 (65.5)	18.7 (65.7)	18.1 (64.6)	18.0 (64.4)	17.8 (64.0)	18.1 (64.6)	18.3 (64.9)
Mean daily minimum °C (°F)	12.6 (54.7)	12.6 (54.7)	12.7 (54.9)	13.1 (55.6)	13.3 (55.9)	13.0 (55.4)	12.6 (54.7)	12.9 (55.2)	12.8 (55.0)	12.9 (55.2)	12.9 (55.2)	13.1 (55.6)	12.9 (55.2)
Average precipitation mm (inches)	111.2 (4.38)	112.6 (4.43)	183.1 (7.21)	269.4 (10.61)	316.6 (12.46)	221.3 (8.71)	175.8 (6.92)	189.1 (7.44)	262.7 (10.34)	313.5 (12.34)	244.2 (9.61)	155.5 (6.12)	2,555 (100.6)
Average precipitation days (≥ 1.0 mm)	13	14	19	22	23	19	17	19	22	25	23	17	229
Average relative humidity (%)	84	83	84	86	87	85	84	82	84	85	86	86	85
Mean monthly sunshine hours	139.5	129.9	120.9	90.0	105.4	120.0	161.2	155.0	120.0	108.5	108.0	117.8	1,476.2
Mean daily sunshine hours	4.5	4.6	3.9	3.0	3.4	4.0	5.2	5.0	4.0	3.5	3.6	3.8	4.0
Source: Instituto de Hidrologia Meteorologia y Estudios Ambientales

== Notables Caldeños ==
- Luis Fernando Montoya professional soccer coach
- Ciro Mendía poet and playwright
