= Gabriel González (referee) =

Paraguayan football referee (born 1942)

Efrain Gabriel González Roa (born March 18, 1942, in Puerto Casado) is a Paraguayan retired football referee. He is known for having refereed in the 1986 FIFA World Cup in Mexico, when he sent off England's Ray Wilkins during a group game against Morocco: Wilkins having thrown the ball at him.
