= Tony Gómez =

Uruguayan footballer (born 1967)

Personal information
- Full name: Tony César Gómez
- Date of birth: 23 September 1966 (age 60)
- Place of birth: Cerro Largo
- Position: Right back

Senior career*
Years	Team	Apps	(Gls)
- Club Nacional de Football
- Club Atletico River Plate
- Montevideo Wanderers
- Plaza Colonia
- San Lorenzo de Almagro
- Club Atlético Independiente
- Estudiantes de La Plata
- Barcelona Sporting Club
- Guangzhou Matsunichi
- * Club domestic league appearances and goals

Tony César Gómez (Cerro Largo, Uruguay, born September 23, 1966) is a former Uruguayan footballer. He played as right back or defensive midfielder. In 1988, he scored the last penalty in the penalty round winning Nacional their third Copa Intercontinental. He played for teams in Uruguay (Club Nacional de Football, Club Atletico River Plate, Montevideo Wanderers, Plaza Colonia), Argentina (San Lorenzo de Almagro, Club Atlético Independiente, Estudiantes de La Plata), Barcelona Sporting Club in Ecuador and finally Guangzhou Matsunichi in China.

He also played for the Uruguay national team in the Copa América 1997 and the 1998 FIFA World Cup qualifiers.

== Honours ==
=== National tournaments ===
Title	Club	Country	Year
Primera División de Uruguay	Nacional	Uruguay	1983
Liguilla Pre-Libertadores de América	Nacional	Uruguay	1983

=== International tournaments ===
Title	Club	Country	Year
Copa Libertadores	Nacional	Uruguay	1988
Intercontinental Cup	Nacional	Uruguay	1988
Copa Interamericana	Nacional	Uruguay	1989
Recopa Sudamericana	Nacional	Uruguay	1989
Recopa Sudamericana	Independiente	Argentina	1995
