= Pascal Plovie =

Belgian footballer

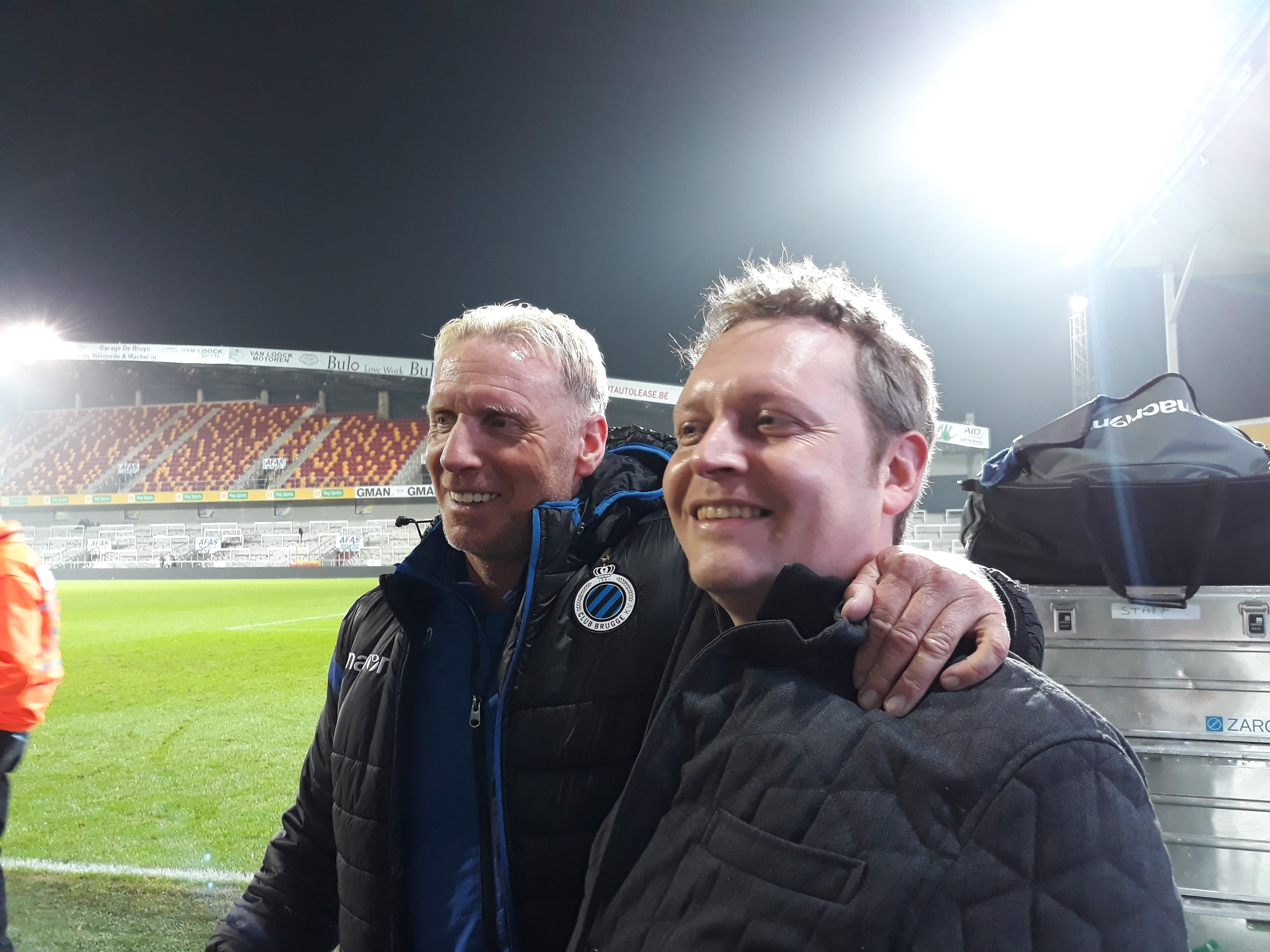

Personal information
- Full name: Pascal Yvan Plovie
- Date of birth: 7 May 1965 (age 61)
- Place of birth: Bruges, Belgium
- Height: 1.81 m (5 ft 11 in)
- Position: Defender

Senior career*
Years	Team	Apps	(Gls)
1984–1986	Club Brugge K.V.	3	(0)
1986–1988	Royal Antwerp FC	43	(0)
1988–1996	Club Brugge K.V.	121	(3)
1996–1998	Royal Antwerp FC	5	(0)
	Total	172	(3)

International career
1990	Belgium	5	(0)
- * Club domestic league appearances and goals

Pascal Yvan Plovie (born 7 May 1965 in Bruges) is a Belgian former footballer. Playing as a defender he represented Club Brugge K.V. and Royal Antwerp FC as well as the Belgium national football team.
