= Rafael Paz =

Spanish footballer

Rafa Paz
Personal information
- Full name: Rafael Paz Marín
- Date of birth: 2 August 1965 (age 61)
- Place of birth: Puebla de Don Fadrique, Spain
- Height: 1.80 m (5 ft 11 in)
- Position: Midfielder

Youth career
- Huéscar
- Granada 74
- 1980–1984: Sevilla

Senior career*
Years	Team	Apps	(Gls)
1984–1986	Sevilla B		
1984–1997	Sevilla	340	(25)
1997	Celaya	14	(1)
Total		354	(26)

International career
1982	Spain U16	1	(0)
1984	Spain U18	1	(0)
1985	Spain U20	3	(0)
1985–1987	Spain U21	9	(2)
1990	Spain	7	(0)
- * Club domestic league appearances and goals

Rafael 'Rafa' Paz Marín (born 2 August 1965) is a Spanish former professional footballer who played mainly as a right midfielder.

== Club career ==
Paz was born in Puebla de Don Fadrique, Province of Granada. After starting out as a youth with CP Granada 74 he signed with neighbours Sevilla FC still as a junior, going on to appear in 386 competitive games with the club and score 27 goals. In the 1989–90 season, while playing all the matches safe one, he netted a career-best six times, helping the Andalusians to finish sixth in La Liga with the subsequent qualification for the UEFA Cup.

Upon Sevilla's relegation in 1997, Paz moved to Mexico, closing out his career after one season with Atlético Celaya, where he teamed up with former fellow internationals Emilio Butragueño and Rafael Martín Vázquez.

== International career ==
Paz represented Spain on seven occasions, all in 1990, and was included in the squad for the 1990 FIFA World Cup where he took part in two matches. His debut came on 21 February, in a friendly against Czechoslovakia.

== Honours ==
Spain U20

- FIFA U-20 World Cup runner-up: 1985
