= Carlos Vásquez (Uruguayan footballer) =

Uruguayan footballer (born 1962)

Personal information
- Date of birth: 12 March 1962 (age 64)

International career
Years	Team	Apps	(Gls)
1983–1984	Uruguay	3	(0)

Carlos Vásquez (born 12 March 1962) is a Uruguayan footballer. He played in three matches for the Uruguay national football team from 1983 to 1984. He was also part of Uruguay's squad for the 1983 Copa América tournament.
