= Enrique Saravia =

Uruguayan footballer (born 1967)

Personal information
- Full name: Enrique Ángel Saravia Hernández
- Date of birth: 23 April 1967 (age 59)
- Place of birth: Montevideo, Uruguay
- Height: 1.82 m (6 ft 0 in)
- Position: Centre-back

Youth career
- Nacional

Senior career*
Years	Team	Apps	(Gls)
1986–1993	Nacional	73	(6)
1989	→ LDU Quito (loan)		
1992–1993	→ Deportivo Mandiyú (loan)	22	(0)
1994	Defensor Sporting	7	(0)
1995	Olimpia	10	(0)
1995–1996	Rampla Juniors		
1997	Cerro	18	(3)
1998	Everton		(3)
1999	Rentistas	12	(1)
2000–2001	Rocha		
2001–2003	Colón FC	34	(1)
2004	Alianza Montevideo	3	(0)
- * Club domestic league appearances and goals

Enrique Ángel Saravia Hernández (born 23 April 1967) is a Uruguayan former professional footballer who played as a centre-back for clubs of Uruguay, Argentina, Chile, Paraguay and Ecuador.

== Teams ==
- (Uruguay) Nacional 1988-1989
- (Ecuador) Liga Deportiva Universitaria de Quito 1989
- (Uruguay) Nacional 1990-1992
- (Argentina) Deportivo Mandiyú 1992–1993
- (Uruguay) Nacional 1993
- (Uruguay) Defensor Sporting 1994
- (Paraguay) Olimpia 1995
- (Uruguay) Rampla Juniors 1995–1996
- (Uruguay) Cerro 1996
- (Chile) Everton 1998
- (Uruguay) Rentistas 1999
- (Uruguay) Rocha 2000–2001
- (Uruguay) Colón 2001-2003
