= Javier Zeoli =

Uruguayan footballer (born 1962)

Personal information
- Full name: Adolfo Javier Zeoli Martínez
- Date of birth: 2 May 1962 (age 64)
- Place of birth: Montevideo, Uruguay
- Height: 1.80 m (5 ft 11 in)
- Position: Goalkeeper

Senior career*
Years	Team	Apps	(Gls)
1982–1989	Danubio		
1989–1990	Tenerife	15	(0)
1991	Deportivo Mandiyú	6	(0)
1991–1992	Talleres	29	(0)
1993–1994	River Plate	12	(0)
1994	Bolívar		
1995	Nacional		
1996	Palestino		
1997	Danubio		

International career
1988–1990	Uruguay	14	(0)
- * Club domestic league appearances and goals

Adolfo Javier Zeoli Martínez (born 2 May 1962 in Montevideo) is a former Uruguayan footballer.

== International career ==
Zeoli made 14 appearances for the senior Uruguay national football team from 1988 to 1990, and he was a member of the squad at the 1990 FIFA World Cup finals. He also played in the 1989 Copa América.
