= Jeong Gi-dong =

South Korean footballer (born 1961)

Personal information
- Date of birth: 13 May 1961 (age 65)
- Place of birth: South Korea
- Height: 1.82 m (6 ft 0 in)
- Position: Goalkeeper

Senior career*
Years	Team	Apps	(Gls)
1983–1991	POSCO Atoms	121	(0)
1984	Sangmu FC		

International career
1984–1990	South Korea	3	(0)
- * Club domestic league appearances and goals

- Jeong Gi-dong
- Hangul: 정기동
- RR: Jeong Gidong
- MR: Chŏng Kidong

Jeong Gi-dong (born 13 May 1961) is a South Korean football goalkeeper who played for South Korea in the 1984 Asian Cup and 1990 FIFA World Cup. He also played for Pohang Steelers and Sangmu FC.

== International records ==
Year	Apps	Goal
1984	3	0
Total	3	0
