= Luis Fernando Montoya =

Colombian football manager

Personal information
- Full name: Luis Fernando Montoya Soto
- Date of birth: 2 May 1957 (age 69)
- Place of birth: Caldas, Colombia

Managerial career
- Years: Team
- 1985–1991: Colombia U20 (assistant)
- 1993–1994: Atlético Bucaramanga (assistant)
- 1995: Colombia U20
- 2001–2002: Atlético Nacional
- 2003–2004: Once Caldas

Luis Fernando Montoya Soto (born 2 May 1957) is a former Colombian football manager, best known for leading Once Caldas to winning 2004 Copa Libertadores. He was shot during a robbery in December 2004. Since then he has been struggling with a tetraplegia.

== Career ==
Montoya began his career as a manager in Caldas, moving to Medellín to study at the Jaime Izasa Cadavid Polytechnic. He started training some amateur Antioquia league's clubs, where he got several titles, which led him to be the assistant manager of the Colombia U20. He led Atlético Nacional to the 2002 Torneo Finalización finals.

Montoya led Once Caldas to win the 2003 Torneo Apertura, their first championship after the 1950 win, and the 2004 Copa Libertadores. Those achievements made Montoya win the South American Coach of the Year achievement.

== Personal life ==
Montoya was born in Caldas, Colombia. He married Adriana Herrera in 1998 and had a child in 2001 named José Fernando Montoya. In December 2004, Montoya was left paralyzed after being shot during an attempted robbery in Caldas. Since then, he has undergone experimental stem cell treatment in an effort to recover. Nowadays, he lives in Medellín with his son and his wife.

== Honours ==
Once Caldas

- Categoría Primera A: 2003 Apertura
- Copa Libertadores: 2004

Awards and achievements
Preceded by (Argentina) Carlos Bianchi	South American Coach of the Year; 2004	Succeeded by (Uruguay) Aníbal Ruiz
