= Carlos Olarán =

Argentine footballer

Carlos Olaran
Personal information
- Full name: Carlos Isidro Olaran
- Position: Defender

Senior career*
Years	Team	Apps	(Gls)
-1984	Argentinos Juniors	89	(2)
1985-1986	Chacarita Juniors	39	(2)
1986-1990	Racing Club de Avellaneda	122	(1)
1990-1993	Hapoel Petah Tikva F.C.		
1993-1994	Hapoel Haifa F.C.		
1994-1995	Sektzia Nes Tziona F.C.		
1995-1996	Hakoah Amidar Ramat Gan F.C.		
1996-1997	Maccabi Herzliya F.C.		
1997-1999	All Boys	53	(2)
1999-2000	Club El Porvenir	26	(1)
- * Club domestic league appearances and goals

Carlos Olarán (born 17 November 1961 in Argentina) is an Argentinean retired footballer.
