= Roberto Fleitas =

Uruguayan footballer and coach (1932–2024)

Personal information
- Date of birth: 25 May 1932
- Place of birth: Uruguay
- Date of death: 3 March 2024 (aged 91)
- Position: Centre-back

Senior career*
Years	Team	Apps	(Gls)
- Liverpool

International career
- Uruguay

Managerial career
- 1979: Progreso
- 1983: Central Español
- 1985: Progreso
- 1987–1988: Uruguay
- 1988: Nacional
- 1989–1990: Peñarol
- 1990–1992: Nacional
- 1997: Nacional
- 2000: Liverpool
Medal record
Men's Football
Representing Uruguay (as manager)
Copa América
Winner	1987
- * Club domestic league appearances and goals

A photograph of Rober Flaitas from 1988

Roberto Fleitas (25 May 1932 – 3 March 2024) was a Uruguayan football head coach and player who managed the Uruguay national team and several top level Uruguayan clubs. He is one of the four managers, and the first, to have won both Copa América and Copa Libertadores, along with Francisco Maturana, Óscar Tabárez and Tite.

== Career ==
Born on 25 May 1932, Fleitas played as a centre-back for Montevideo-based club Liverpool.

After retiring from playing, Fleitas started a career as a head coach. He won the 1987 Copa América as Uruguay national team coach, and won the 1992 Uruguayan Primera División, the 1988 Copa Libertadores and the 1988 Intercontinental Cup as Nacional's head coach. He won the South American Coach of the Year award in 1988.

== Death ==
Fleitas died on 3 March 2024, at the age of 91.
