= Jorge Seré =

Uruguayan footballer (born 1961)

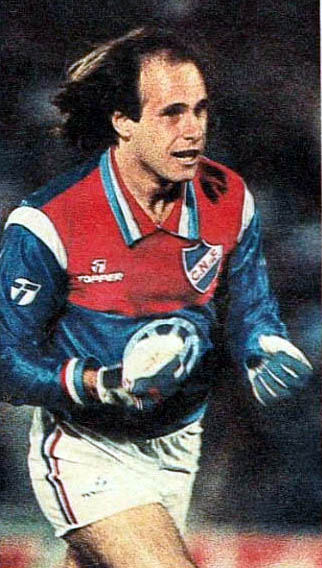
- Seré with Nacional in 1988

Personal information
- Full name: Jorge Fernando Seré Dulcini
- Date of birth: 9 July 1961 (age 65)
- Place of birth: Montevideo, Uruguay
- Height: 1.81 m (5 ft 11 in)
- Position: Goalkeeper

Senior career*
Years	Team	Apps	(Gls)
1981–1987	Danubio		
1988–1995	Nacional		
1995	Coritiba		
1996–1997	Liverpool Montevideo		
1998–1999	Rampla Juniors		
2000	Liverpool Montevideo		

International career
1987–1989	Uruguay	4	(0)
Medal record
Representing Uruguay
Copa América
Winner	1987 Argentina
Runner-up	1989 Brazil
- * Club domestic league appearances and goals

Jorge Fernando Seré Dulcini (born 9 July 1961) is a retired Uruguayan footballer who played as a goalkeeper.

== Club career ==
Seré won several titles with Nacional, including the 1988 Intercontinental Cup where he saved four penalties in the extended penalty shootout as Nacional defeated PSV Eindhoven.

== International career ==
Seré made 10 appearances for the senior Uruguay national football team from 1987 to 1989. He also played in the 1987 and 1989 Copa América.

== Honours ==
- Copa Libertadores: 1988
- Intercontinental Cup: 1988
- Recopa Sudamericana: 1989
- Copa Interamericana: 1989
- Primera División Uruguaya: 1992
