= Héctor Núñez =

Uruguayan footballer and manager (1936–2011)

Personal information
- Full name: Héctor Núñez Bello
- Date of birth: 8 May 1936
- Place of birth: Montevideo, Uruguay
- Date of death: 20 December 2011 (aged 75)
- Place of death: Madrid, Spain
- Position: Striker

Senior career*
Years	Team	Apps	(Gls)
1954–1959	Nacional		
1959–1965	Valencia	154	(61)
1965–1966	Mallorca	24	(6)
1966–1968	Levante	42	(13)

International career
1957–1959	Uruguay	7	(0)

Managerial career
- 1971: Calvo Sotelo
- 1972: Tenerife
- 1972–1973: Tenerife
- 1973–1974: Levante
- 1974–1975: Rayo Vallecano
- 1975–1976: Real Valladolid
- 1976: Granada
- 1977–1978: Rayo Vallecano
- 1978: Atlético Madrid
- 1979–1980: Rayo Vallecano
- 1981–1983: Tecos
- 1983–1984: Las Palmas
- 1984–1987: Rayo Vallecano
- 1989: Nacional
- 1992: Costa Rica
- 1993–1994: Valencia
- 1994–1997: Uruguay
- 2001: Al-Nasr
- 2007: Tacuarembó
- * Club domestic league appearances and goals

Héctor Núñez Bello (8 May 1936 – 19 December 2011) was a Uruguayan footballer and manager. He was manager of the Uruguay squad that won Copa América 1995.

== Playing career ==
Núñez was born in Montevideo and started his playing career at the age of 19 playing for Nacional. His good form earned him a chance to play for Uruguay, and he was part of the squad for the 1959 Copa América.

He moved to Spain to join Valencia, and he won the Fairs Cup in two consecutive seasons with the club. Later in his career he played for Mallorca and Levante.

Núñez died in Spain at age 75.

== Managerial career ==
Núñez worked as the manager of a considerable number of clubs in Spain and has also managed in Mexican and Uruguayan club football. He was manager of the Costa Rica national team in 1992 and the Uruguay national team between 1994 and 1997, where he led Uruguay to the Copa América 1995 championship.

== Honours ==
=== Player ===
Nacional

- Uruguayan Primera División: 1955, 1956, 1957

Valencia

- Inter-Cities Fairs Cup: 1961–62, 1962–63

=== Manager ===
Nacional

- Copa Interamericana: 1988
- Recopa Sudamericana: 1989

Uruguay

- Copa América: 1995
