= Jorge Theiler =

Argentine footballer and manager

Personal information
- Full name: Jorge Walter Theiler
- Date of birth: 12 May 1964 (age 62)
- Place of birth: San José de la Esquina, Argentina
- Height: 1.89 m (6 ft 2 in)
- Position: Defender

Youth career
- Newell's Old Boys

Senior career*
Years	Team	Apps	(Gls)
1983–1989	Newell's Old Boys	222	(14)
1990–1991	River Plate	6	(0)
1991	St. Gallen	7	(0)
1992	San Lorenzo	1	(0)
1993	Newell's Old Boys	4	(1)
Total		240	(15)

International career
1983	Argentina U20	6	(0)
- Argentina

Managerial career
- 2004: Libertad
- 2005: Instituto de Córdoba
- 2007–2008: Argentina U15
- 2017–2018: Atlanta United (assistant)
- 2019–2022: Mexico (assistant)
- 2023–: Inter Miami (assistant)
- * Club domestic league appearances and goals

Jorge Walter Theiler (born 12 May 1964) is an Argentine former professional footballer who played as a defender; he won the Primera División Argentina in 1987–88 with Newell's Old Boys.

Theiler came through the youth team of Newell's Old Boys to make his debut in 1983. He played in the 1983 FIFA World Youth Championship where the Argentina Under-20 team reached the final but lost to Brazil. He also played for the full national team and was part of the squad for Copa América 1987. Newell's won the 1987–88 Primera División.

In 1990 Theiler joined River Plate bet he never established himself in the first team, he then had a spell with St. Gallen of Switzerland before returning to Argentina to join San Lorenzo de Almagro. In 1993, he returned to Newell's Old Boys.

After retiring as a player he went on to pursue a career in coaching. After working with the youth teams of River Plate and Newell's Old Boys he became the manager of Libertad of Paraguay in 2004 for three games. In 2005, he had a brief spell as the manager of Instituto de Córdoba. In 2008, he was the manager of the Argentina Under-15 football team for the South American Under-15 Football Championship.

== Honours ==
Newell's Old Boys

- Primera División Argentina: 1987–88

Argentina Youth

- South American Games: 1986
