= Juan Carlos de Lima =

Uruguayan footballer (1962–2025)

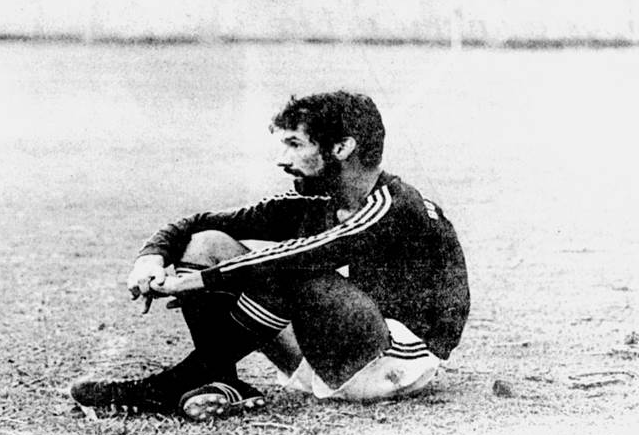
- De Lima in 1987

Personal information
- Full name: Juan Carlos de Lima del Castillo
- Date of birth: 2 May 1962
- Place of birth: Florida, Uruguay
- Date of death: 1 October 2025 (aged 63)
- Height: 1.83 m (6 ft 0 in)
- Position: Striker

Senior career*
| Years | Team | Apps | (Gls) |
| 1977–1981 | Maracaná Tarariras | – | (–) |
| 1982 | España de Florida | – | (–) |
| 1983–1984 | Liverpool Montevideo | | |
| 1985–1986 | Universidad Católica (ECU) | | (24) |
| 1986 | Deportivo Quito | | (23) |
| 1986 | Nacional | 0 | (0) |
| 1987 | Universidad Católica (CHI) | | |
| 1988 | Botafogo | | |
| 1988–1989 | Nacional | 11 | (9) |
| 1989–1991 | Emelec | | (31) |
| 1992 | O'Higgins | | |
| 1994 | Defensor Sporting | | |
| 1995 | Peñarol | | |
| 1996 | Defensor Sporting | | |
| 1997–2000 | Peñarol | | |

Managerial career
- 2005–2006: Nacional (assistant)
- Florida (city team)
- Nacional Florida
- Alianza (youth)
- * Club domestic league appearances and goals

Juan Carlos de Lima del Castillo (2 May 1962 – 1 October 2025) was a Uruguayan footballer who played at club level in Uruguay, Brazil, Chile and Ecuador. Born in Florida, Uruguay on 2 May 1962, he died on 1 October 2025, at the age of 63.

== Teams ==
=== Player ===
- (Uruguay) Maracaná Tarariras 1977–1981
- (Uruguay) España de Florida 1982
- (Uruguay) Liverpool 1983–1984
- (Ecuador) Universidad Católica 1985–1986
- (Ecuador) Deportivo Quito 1986
- (Uruguay) Nacional 1986
- (Chile) Universidad Católica 1987
- (Brazil) Botafogo 1988
- (Uruguay) Nacional 1988–1989
- (Ecuador) Emelec 1989–1991
- (Chile) O´Higgins 1992
- (Uruguay) Defensor Sporting 1994
- (Uruguay) Peñarol 1995
- (Uruguay) Defensor Sporting 1996
- (Uruguay) Peñarol 1997–2000

=== Coach ===
- (Uruguay) Nacional (assistant) 2005–2006
- (Uruguay) Florida (city team)
- (Uruguay) Nacional Florida
- (Uruguay) Alianza (youth)
