= 1988 Supercopa Libertadores =

1988 Supercopa Libertadores João Havelange

Tournament details
- Dates: February 10 – June 18
- Teams: 13 (from 4 confederations)

Final positions
- Champions: (Argentina) Racing (1st title)
- Runners-up: (Brazil) Cruzeiro

Tournament statistics
- Matches played: 24
- Goals scored: 51 (2.13 per match)
- Top scorer(s): (Uruguay) Sergio Oliveira (Uruguay) Antonio Alzamendi (4 goals)

The 1988 Supercopa Libertadores was the inaugural year of the competition. The tournament was open to all the past winners of the Copa Libertadores. It commenced on 10 February and concluded on 18 June. A total of 13 football clubs entered the first round draw.

It was won by Argentinian side Racing over Brazilian side Cruzeiro 3–2 on aggregate after a two-legged final. The tournament's top scorer was Sergio Oliveira of Nacional and Antonio Alzamendi of River Plate with 4 goals each.

== Qualified teams ==
Up until the beginning of 1988, thirteen teams had won the Copa Libertadores at least once since its inaugural season in 1960.

Team	First won
(Uruguay) Peñarol	1960
(Brazil) Santos	1962
(Argentina) Independiente	1964
(Argentina) Racing	1967
(Argentina) Estudiantes	1968
(Uruguay) Nacional	1971
(Brazil) Cruzeiro	1976
(Argentina) Boca Juniors	1977
(Paraguay) Olimpia	1979
(Brazil) Flamengo	1981
(Brazil) Grêmio	1983
(Argentina) Argentinos Juniors	1985
(Argentina) River Plate	1986

== Knockout bracket ==
First round
(Argentina) River Plate	0	4
(Paraguay) Olimpia	2	0
(Brazil) Gremio	0	2
(Argentina) Boca Juniors	1	0
(Uruguay) Peñarol	1	0
(Argentina) Argentinos Juniors	0	2
(Brazil) Cruzeiro	2	1
(Argentina) Independiente	1	0
(Brazil) Flamengo	1	3
(Argentina) Estudiantes	1	0

Quarter-finals*
(Argentina) River Plate	0	3
(Brazil) Gremio	1	1
(Argentina) Racing	2	0
(Brazil) Santos	0	0
(Argentina) Argentinos Juniors	0	0
(Brazil) Cruzeiro	1	1
(Brazil) Flamengo	0	0
(Uruguay) Nacional	3	2

Semi-finals
(Argentina) River Plate	1	1
(Argentina) Racing	2	1
(Brazil) Cruzeiro	2	1
(Uruguay) Nacional	3	0

Finals
(Argentina) Racing	2	1
(Brazil) Cruzeiro	1	1

* Although Racing and Santos FC played in a first round tie, their series was placed in the quarterfinals due to the winner Racing getting a bye to the semifinal.

== First stage ==
The matches were played from 10 February to 20 April. Teams from the same nation could not be drawn against one another.

Team 1	Agg.	Team 2	1st leg	2nd leg
Independiente (Argentina)	1–3	(Brazil) Cruzeiro	1–2	0–1
Peñarol (Uruguay)	1–2	(Argentina) Argentinos Juniors	1–0	0–2
Estudiantes (Argentina)	1–4	(Brazil) Flamengo	1–1	0–3
Olimpia (Paraguay)	2–4	(Argentina) River Plate	2–0	0–4
Boca Juniors (Argentina)	1–2	(Brazil) Grêmio	1–0	0–2
Racing (Argentina)	2–0	(Brazil) Santos	2–0	0–0

- Nacional received a bye to the quarter-finals.

== Quarter-finals ==
The matches were played from 28 April to 18 May. Racing Club received a bye into the next round.

Team 1	Agg.	Team 2	1st leg	2nd leg
Cruzeiro (Brazil)	2–0	(Argentina) Argentinos Juniors	1–0	1–0
Nacional (Uruguay)	5–0	(Brazil) Flamengo	3–0	2–0
Grêmio (Brazil)	2–3	(Argentina) River Plate	1–0	1–3

- Racing received a bye to the semi-finals.

== Semi-finals ==
The matches were played from 25 May to 3 June.

Team 1	Agg.	Team 2	1st leg	2nd leg
Nacional (Uruguay)	3–3 (a)	(Brazil) Cruzeiro	3–2	0–1
Racing (Argentina)	3–2	(Argentina) River Plate	2–1	1–1

== Finals ==
July 13, 1988

Racing (Argentina)	2–1	(Brazil) Cruzeiro
Colombatti 43'; Fernández 44'		Robson 36'

El Cilindro, Avellaneda
Referee: Hernán Silva (Chile)

July 18, 1988

Cruzeiro (Brazil)	1–1	(Argentina) Racing
Robson 37'		Catalán 45'

Mineirão, Belo Horizonte
Referee: Juan Daniel Cardellino (Uruguay)

== See also ==
- 1988 Copa Libertadores
- 1989 Recopa Sudamericana
