= Héctor Morán =

Uruguayan footballer (born 1962)

Personal information
- Full name: Héctor Eduardo Morán
- Date of birth: 13 February 1962 (age 64)
- Place of birth: Durazno, Uruguay
- Height: 1.74 m (5 ft 9 in)
- Position: Midfielder

Senior career*
| Years | Team | Apps | (Gls) |
| 1985–1986 | Cerro | | |
| 1987–1991 | Nacional | 134 | (5) |
| 1992–1994 | Deportivo Mandiyú | 85 | (5) |
| 1995 | Olimpia | | |
| 1996 | Cerro | | |
| 1997 | Unión Española | | |
| 1998 | Central Español | | |

International career
| 1991–1993 | Uruguay | 23 | (2) |
- * Club domestic league appearances and goals

Héctor Eduardo Morán Correa (born 13 February 1962, in Durazno) is a former football midfielder from Uruguay. His nickname was "Indio".

== Club career ==
Morán played for Cerro, Nacional and Central Español in Uruguay, Deportivo Mandiyú in Argentina, Olimpia in Paraguay and Unión Española in Chile. He retired in 1998.

== International career ==
Morán made his debut for the Uruguay national team on 7 August 1988 against Colombia (1–2), and he earned a total number of 23 international caps, scoring two goals.
