= William Castro =

Uruguayan footballer (born 1962)

Personal information
- Full name: William Adrián Castro Rosso
- Date of birth: 22 May 1962 (age 64)
- Place of birth: Mercedes, Uruguay
- Height: 1.76 m (5 ft 9 in)
- Position: Midfielder

Senior career*
| Years | Team | Apps | (Gls) |
| 1982–1985 | Bella Vista | | |
| 1985 | Gimnasia y Esgrima (LP) | 10 | (0) |
| 1987 | Bella Vista | | |
| 1988–1989 | Nacional | | |
| 1990–1991 | Cruz Azul | 34 | (5) |
| 1992–1993 | Peñarol | | |
| 1994 | Universitario | | (3) |
| 1995 | Progreso | | |
| 1996 | Liverpool de Montevideo | | |
| 1997 | Punta del Este | | |
| 1998 | Miramar Misiones | | |

International career
| 1989–1991 | Uruguay | 9 | (2) |
- * Club domestic league appearances and goals

William Adrián Castro Rosso (born 22 May 1962 in Mercedes) is a former Uruguayan footballer.

== Club career ==
Castro had spells with Club de Gimnasia y Esgrima La Plata in the Primera División de Argentina and Cruz Azul in the Primera División de Mexico.

== International career ==
Castro made nine appearances for the senior Uruguay national football team from 1989 to 1991, and he was a member of the squad at the 1990 FIFA World Cup.
