= José Pintos =

Uruguayan footballer (born 1964)

Personal information
- Full name: José Luis Pintos Saldanha
- Date of birth: 25 March 1964 (age 62)
- Place of birth: Artigas, Uruguay
- Height: 1.70 m (5 ft 7 in)
- Position: Defender

Senior career*
Years	Team	Apps	(Gls)
1984–1994	Nacional	225	(12)
1995	Progreso		

International career
1987–1991	Uruguay	19	(0)
Medal record
Representing Uruguay
Copa América
Winner	1987 Argentina
Runner-up	1989 Brazil
- * Club domestic league appearances and goals

José Luis Pintos Saldanha (born 25 March 1964 in Artigas) is a Uruguayan former footballer. He was nicknamed "Chango" during his career.

== International career ==
Pintos Saldanha made 19 appearances for the Uruguay national football team from 1987 to 1991, including an appearance at the 1990 FIFA World Cup finals. He also played in the 1989 and 1991 Copa América.
