= Jorge Daniel Cardaccio =

Uruguayan footballer (born 1959)

Cardaccio
Personal information
- Full name: Jorge Daniel Cardaccio
- Date of birth: 14 February 1959 (age 67)
- Place of birth: Montevideo, Uruguay
- Position: Midfielder

Youth career
- 1976: Central Español

Senior career*
| Years | Team | Apps | (Gls) |
| 1976–1977 | Central Español | | |
| 1977–1978 | Centro Atlético Fénix | | |
| 1979–1980 | Grêmio FBPA | | |
| 1980–1983 | Deportivo Toluca | | |
| 1984–1986 | Sud América | | |
| 1986–1987 | Atlético San Cristóbal | | |
| 1987–1992 | Club Nacional de Football | | |
- * Club domestic league appearances and goals

Jorge Daniel Cardaccio (born 14 February 1959) is a Uruguayan former professional footballer who played as a midfielder and won the Copa Libertadores with Club Nacional de Football in 1988.

== Career ==
Cardaccio was born in Montevideo. He was noted for his ability in marking and heading, as well as his fighting spirit. He played for clubs in four countries during his career, and won a number of national and intercontinental competitions while playing for his final club, Club Nacional de Football. Cardaccio retired in 1993.

== Honours ==
Grêmio

- Campeonato Gaúcho: 1979

Nacional

- Uruguayan Primera División: 1992
- Copa Libertadores: 1988
- Recopa Sudamericana: 1988 (contested in 1989)
- Copa Interamericana: 1988 (contested in 1989)
- Intercontinental Cup: 1988
- Torneos de Verano tournament marking 70 years of El Gráfico 1989
- Supercopa Sudamericana: runners-up 1990
