= 1993 Supercopa Libertadores finals =

1993 Supercopa Libertadores Finals
- Event: 1993 Supercopa Libertadores
São Paulo	Flamengo
(Brazil)	(Brazil)
4	4
- On aggregate; São Paulo won 5–4 on penalties

First leg
São Paulo	Flamengo
2	2
- Date: November 17, 1993
- Venue: Maracanã Stadium, Rio de Janeiro
- Referee: Márcio Rezende (Brazil)

Second leg
Flamengo	São Paulo
2	2
- Date: November 25, 1992
- Venue: Estádio do Morumbi, São Paulo
- Referee: Renato Marsiglia (Brazil)

The 1993 Supercopa Libertadores Finals was a two-legged football series to determine the winner of the 1993 Supercopa Libertadores. The finals were contested by two Brazilian clubs, São Paulo and Flamengo.

In the first leg, held in Maracanã Stadium in Rio de Janeiro, both teams tied 2–2. The second leg was held in Estádio do Morumbi in São Paulo, being also a 2–2 draw. As both teams equaled on points and goal difference, a penalty shoot-out was carried out to decide a winner. Sao Paulo won 5–4 on penalties, becoming Supercopa Libertadores champion for the first time.

== Qualified teams ==
Team	Previous finals app.
(Brazil) São Paulo	None
(Brazil) Flamengo	None

Bold indicates winning years

== Venues ==
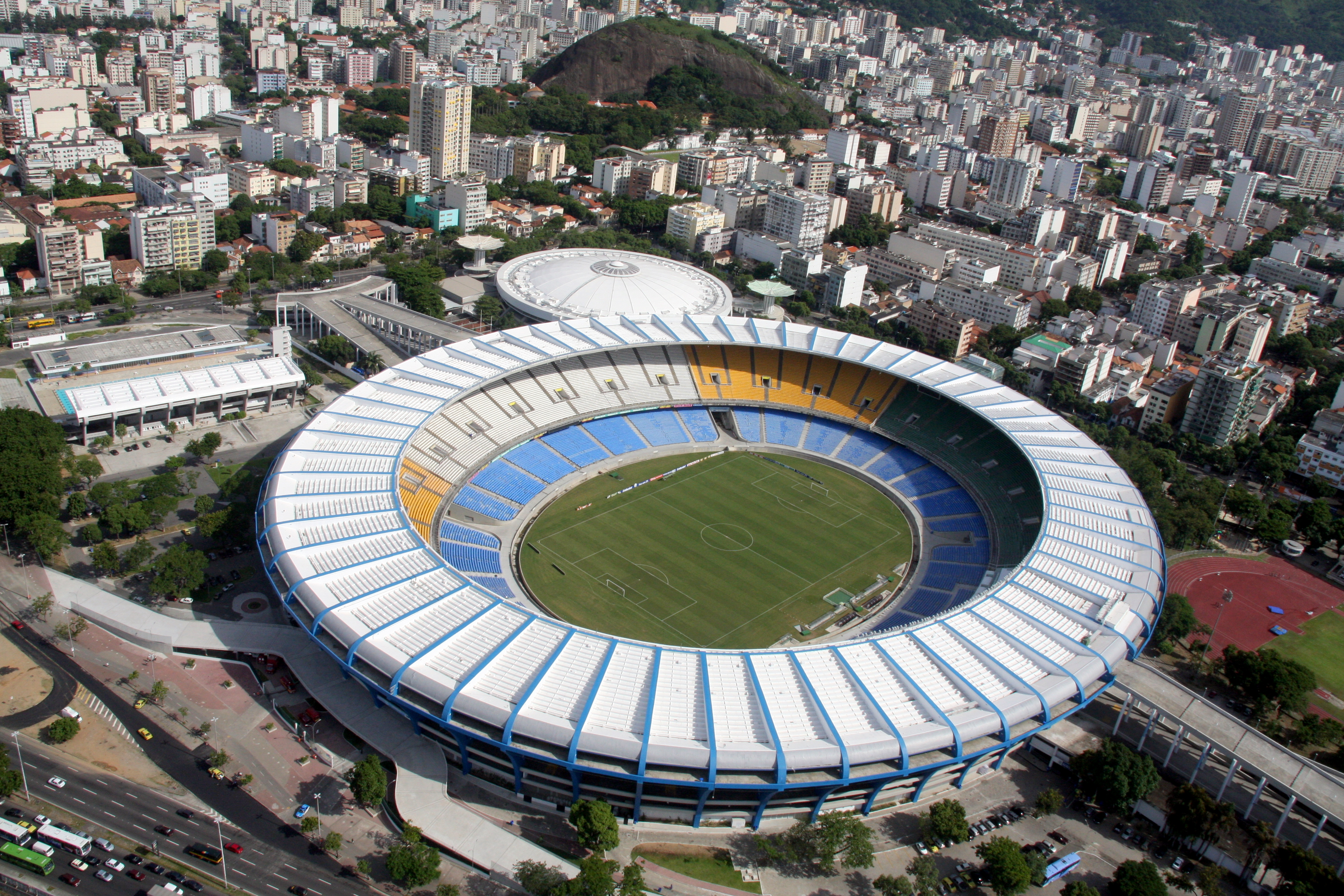
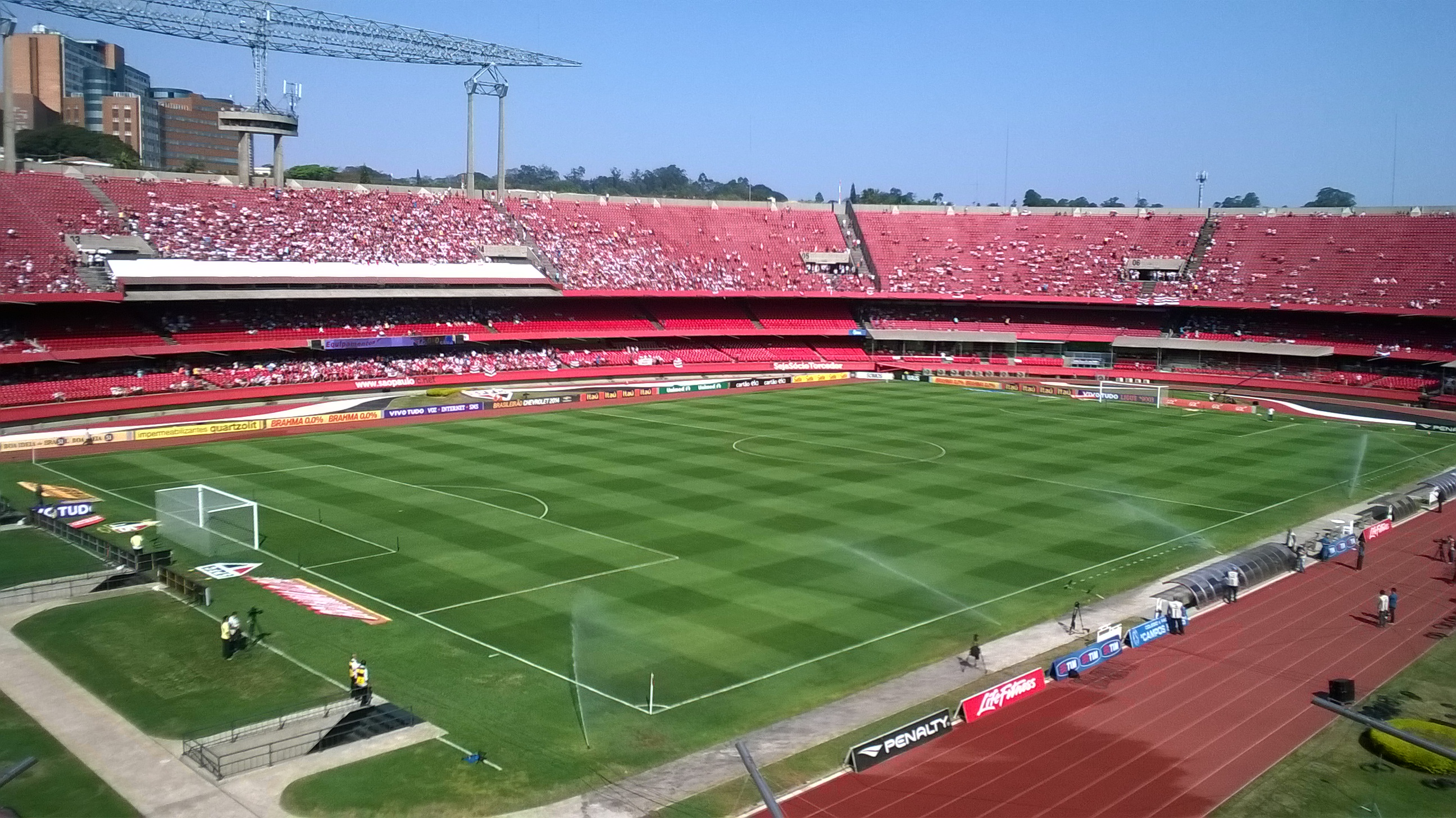
Maracaná (left) and Morumbi, venues for the series

== Route to the final ==
Note: In all scores below, the score of the home team is given first.

(Brazil) São Paulo			Round	(Brazil) Flamengo		
Opponent	Venue	Score		Opponent	Venue	Score
(Argentina) Independiente (won 3–1 on aggregate)	Home	2–0	First round	(Paraguay) Olimpia (won 3–2 on aggregate)	Away	1–0
(Argentina) Independiente (won 3–1 on aggregate)	Away	1–1	First round	(Paraguay) Olimpia (won 3–2 on aggregate)	Home	3–1
(Brazil) Grêmio (won 3–2 on aggregate)	Home	2–2	Quarter-finals	(Argentina) River Plate (tied 2–2 on aggregate, won on penalties)	Away	2–1
(Brazil) Grêmio (won 3–2 on aggregate)	Away	0–1	Quarter-finals	(Argentina) River Plate (tied 2–2 on aggregate, won on penalties)	Home	1–0 (6–5 p)
(Colombia) Atlético Nacional (tied 1–1 on aggregate, won on penalties)	Home	1–0	Semi-finals	(Uruguay) Nacional (won 5–1 on aggregate)	Home	2–1
(Colombia) Atlético Nacional (tied 1–1 on aggregate, won on penalties)	Away	2–1 (4–5 p)	Semi-finals	(Uruguay) Nacional (won 5–1 on aggregate)	Away	0–3

== Match details ==
=== First leg ===
November 17, 1993
First leg

Flamengo (Brazil)	2–2	(Brazil) São Paulo
Marquinhos 36', 47'		Leonardo 16'; Juninho Paulista 88'

Maracanã, Rio de Janeiro
Attendance: 65,355
Referee: Márcio Rezende (Brazil)

**Flamengo**
**São Paulo**

GK	1	(Brazil) Gilmar
RB	2	(Brazil) Charles
CB	3	(Brazil) Junior Baiano	(red card) 49'
CB	4	(Brazil) Rogério (c)
LB	25	(Brazil) Marcos Adriano
DM	5	(Brazil) Fabinho
MF	8	(Brazil) Marquinhos
AM	15	(Brazil) Marcelinho
AM	10	(Brazil) Nélio
FW	7	(Brazil) Renato Gaúcho	(substituted off) 64'
CF	9	(Brazil) Casagrande	(substituted off) 50'
Substitutes:
CB	18	(Brazil) Gélson	(substituted on) 50'
LB	6	(Brazil) Piá	(substituted on) 64'
Manager:
(Brazil) Júnior

GK	1	(Brazil) Zetti
RB	10	(Brazil) Cafu
CB	3	(Brazil) Válber
CB	4	(Brazil) Ronaldão (c)
LB	21	(Brazil) André Luiz
DM	5	(Brazil) Dinho
DM	24	(Brazil) Doriva
MF	8	(Brazil) Cerezo	(substituted off) 66'
AM	6	(Brazil) Leonardo
FW	9	(Brazil) Palhinha	(substituted off) 62'
FW	7	(Brazil) Muller
Substitutes:
GK	12	(Brazil) Rogério Ceni
DF	2	(Brazil) Jura
DF	13	(Brazil) Gilmar
AM	15	(Brazil) Juninho	(substituted on) 62'
FW	11	(Brazil) Valdeir	(substituted on) 66'
Manager:
(Brazil) Telê Santana

=== Second leg ===
November 24, 1993
Second leg

São Paulo (Brazil)	2–2	(Brazil) Flamengo
Leonardo 61'; Juninho 79'		Renato Gaúcho 9'; Marquinhos 81'
Penalties
Dinho (penalty scored); Leonardo (penalty scored); Cafu (penalty scored); André Luiz (penalty scored); Muller (penalty scored)	5–3	(penalty scored) Rogério; (penalty missed) Marcelinho; (penalty scored) Marquinhos; (penalty scored) Gélson

Morumbi, São Paulo
Attendance: 65,355
Referee: Renato Marsiglia (Brazil)

**São Paulo**	**Flamengo**

GK	1	(Brazil) Zetti
RB	10	(Brazil) Cafu
CB	3	(Brazil) Válber
CB	4	(Brazil) Ronaldão (c)
LB	21	(Brazil) André Luiz
DM	5	(Brazil) Dinho
DM	24	(Brazil) Doriva
MF	8	(Brazil) Cerezo	(substituted off) a'
AM	6	(Brazil) Leonardo
FW	9	(Brazil) Palhinha	(substituted off) b'
FW	7	(Brazil) Muller
Substitutes:
GK	12	(Brazil) Rogério Ceni
DF	2	(Brazil) Jura
DF	13	(Brazil) Gilmar
AM	15	(Brazil) Juninho	(substituted on) a'
FW	18	(Brazil) Guilherme	(substituted on) b'
Manager:
(Brazil) Telê Santana

GK	1	(Brazil) Gilmar
RB	2	(Brazil) Charles
CB	18	(Brazil) Gélson
CB	4	(Brazil) Rogério (c)
LB	25	(Brazil) Marcos Adriano
DM	5	(Brazil) Fabinho
MF	8	(Brazil) Marquinhos
AM	15	(Brazil) Marcelinho
AM	10	(Brazil) Nélio
FW	7	(Brazil) Renato Gaúcho	(substituted off) 86'
CF	9	(Brazil) Casagrande	(substituted off) 81'
Substitutes:
MF	16	(Brazil) Éder Lopes	(substituted on) 86'
FW	22	(Brazil) Magno	(substituted on) 81'
Manager:
(Brazil) Júnior
