= 1997 Copa Libertadores finals =

- Event: 1997 Copa Libertadores
Sporting Cristal	Cruzeiro
(Peru)	(Brazil)
0	1
- on aggregate

First leg
Sporting Cristal	Cruzeiro
0	0
- Date: 6 August 1997
- Venue: Estadio Nacional, Lima, Lima
- Referee: Byron Moreno

Second leg
Cruzeiro	Sporting Cristal
1	0
- Date: 13 August 1997
- Venue: Mineirão, Belo Horizonte, Belo Horizonte
- Referee: Javier Castrilli
- Attendance: 95,472 (106,853)

The 1997 Copa Libertadores final was a two-legged football match-up to determine the 1997 Copa Libertadores champion. It was contested by Peruvian club Sporting Cristal and Brazilian club Cruzeiro. The first leg was played on August 6 at Peru's National Stadium, with the second leg played on August 13 at Cruzeiro's venue, Mineirão in Belo Horizonte.

Cruzeiro and Sporting Cristal were in their 3rd and 1st Copa Libertadores finals, respectively. Cruzeiro's last appearance had been in 1977, in which they lost to Argentine club Boca Juniors.

== Qualified teams ==
Team	Previous finals appearances (bold indicates winners)
(Peru) Sporting Cristal	None
(Brazil) Cruzeiro	**1976**, 1977

== Venues ==
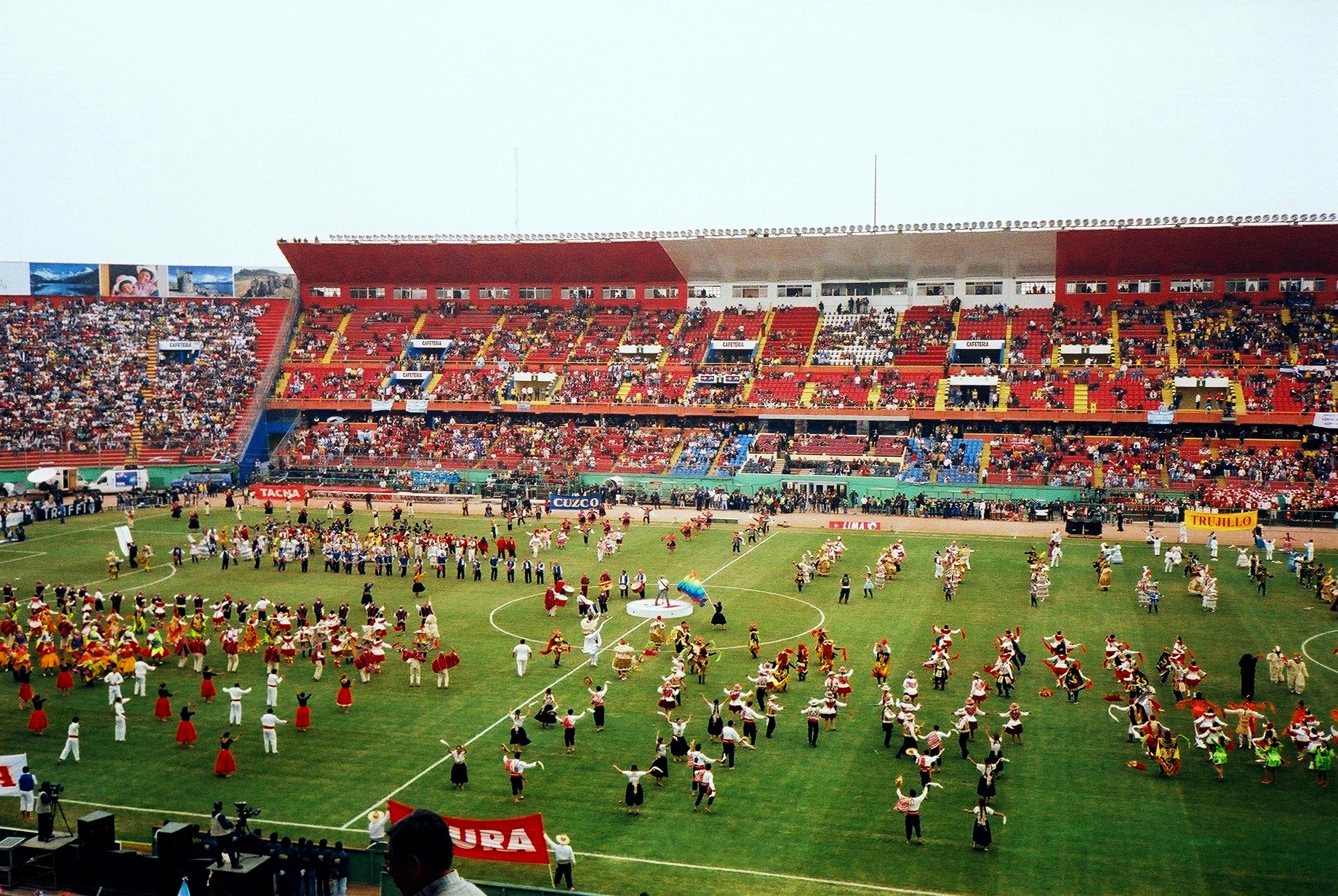
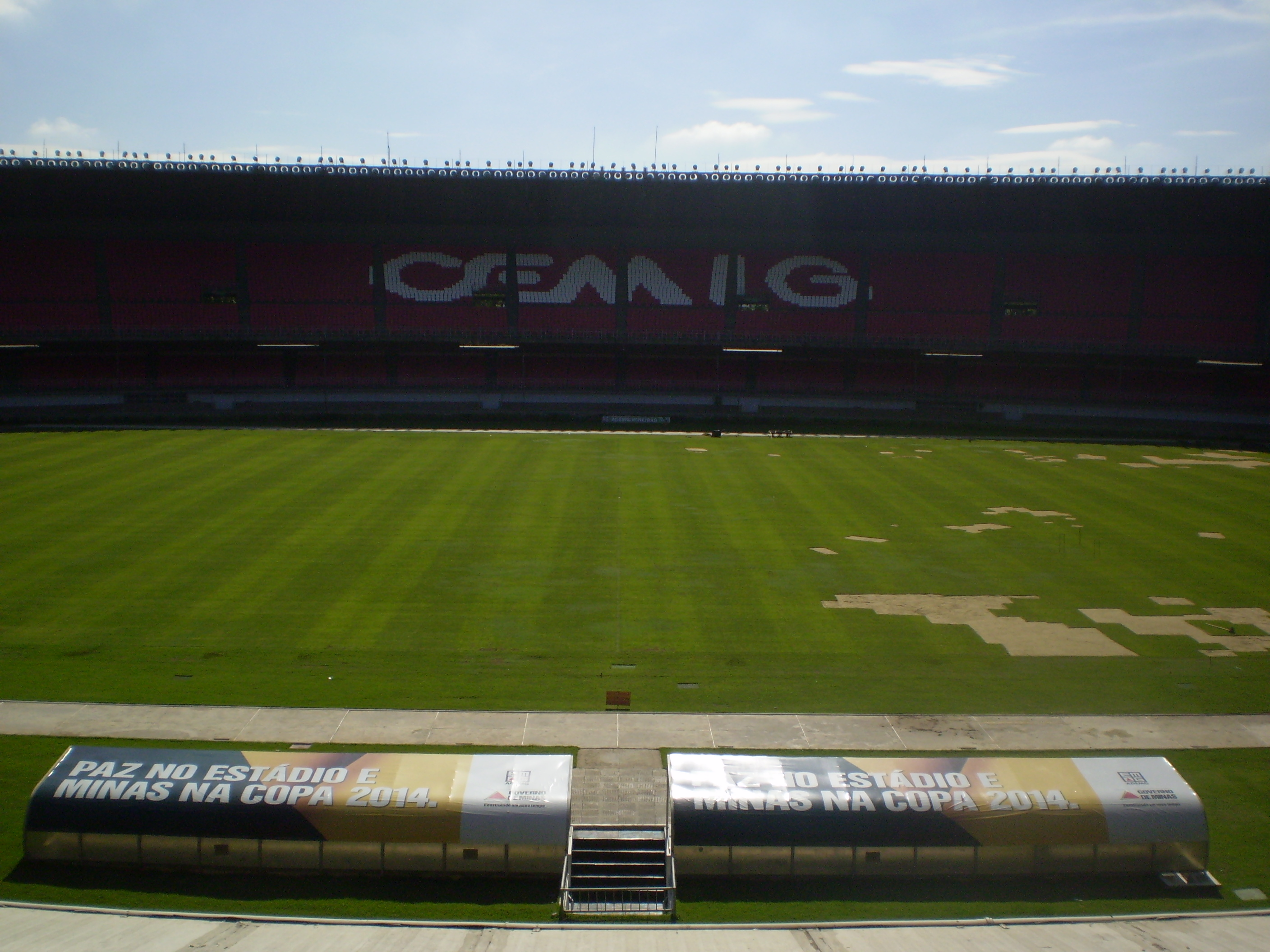
Estadio Nacional (Lima) and Mineirão (Belo Horizonte), venues for the finals

== Rules ==
The final was played over two legs; home and away. The team that accumulated the most points —three for a win, one for a draw, zero for a loss— after the two legs was crowned champion. The away-goals rule was not used. In case both teams had finished tied on points after the second leg, the team with the best goal difference would have won. If the two teams had had equal goal difference, extra time would've been used. The extra time consisted of two 15-minute halves. If the tie was still not broken, a penalty shoot-out would ensue according to the Laws of the Game.

== Route to the finals ==
Cruzeiro qualified to the 1997 Copa Libertadores as the champion team in the 1996 Brazilian Cup. Sporting Cristal qualified as 1996 Peruvian champions.

=== Group 4 of the First Stage ===
Final Group 4 standings
Team	Pld	W	D	L	GF	GA	GD	Pts
(Brazil) Grêmio	6	4	0	2	10	3	+7	**12**
(Brazil) Cruzeiro	6	3	0	3	6	5	+1	**9**
(Peru) Sporting Cristal	6	2	2	2	4	5	−1	**8**
(Peru) Alianza Lima	6	1	2	3	2	9	−7	**5**

Both Cruzeiro and Sporting Cristal were drawn into Group 4, together with their compatriots Grêmio (1996 Brazilian champions) and Alianza Lima (1996 Peruvian championship 2nd place), respectively. Cruzeiro's first group match was against Grêmio in Belo Horizonte. Cruzeiro lost 2–1, with their goal scored by Aílton. Cristal's first group match was against their rivals Alianza, in Lima. The Peruvian teams tied by 0-0.

Cruzeiro second group match was on the road against Alianza Lima. The Brazilian team lost by 1–0. They stayed on the road to play Sporting Cristal. The Peruvian team won by 1–0, and Cruzeiro lost its third game in the tournament, with a few chances of classification to the next stage.

Sporting Cristal third group match was in its home ground too, now against Grêmio, and winning again by 1–0.

Cruzeiro fourth group match was against Grêmio, but this time in the rival's ground, in Porto Alegre. With the obligation of winning to keep the chance of classification alive, Cruzeiro made 1–0 with Palhinha and scored its first three point in the competition. On the same day, Sporting Cristal tied again by 1–1 against Alianza Lima.

The next two games Cruzeiro played at home. Alianza Lima visited first and lost the match 2–0, goals by Reinaldo and Palhinha. In Cruzeiro's last match of group play, they played host to Sporting Cristal, whom they beat 2–1, goals by Alex Mineiro and Reinaldo.

Sporting Cristal last group match was visiting Grêmio in Porto Alegre and losing by 2–0.

Cruzeiro and Sporting Cristal finished 2nd and 3rd, respectively, which advanced them to the Round of 16, together with Grêmio, who finished 1st.

=== Cruzeiro in the knockout stages ===
In the round of 16, they played against Ecuadorian club El Nacional. The first leg was played in Quito and Cruzeiro lost the match 1–0. Second leg, played at home, Cruzeiro won 2–1, with Marcelo Ramos scoring twice, sending the decision to the penalty shootout. In the penalty kicks, Cruzeiro won 5–3, advancing to the next stage.

Cruzeiro's quarterfinal match-up was against fellow Brazilian side Grêmio over again. The first leg, played at home, was won 2–0, goals by Alex Mineiro and Elivélton. The second leg, played in Porto Alegre, was lost 2–1, Fabinho scoring, with Cruzeiro advancing to the next stage by goal difference (3–2).

Cruzeiro's semifinal match-up was against Chilean club Colo-Colo. Cruzeiro won the first leg 1–0, goal scored by Marcelo Ramos, in Belo Horizonte. In Santiago lost 3–2, with Marcelo Ramos and Cleison scoring the goals, deciding again in the penalty kicks. In the penalty shootout Cruzeiro won 4–1, advancing to the Copa Libertadores final matches after 20 years.

As of the finals, Cruzeiro has an efficacy rating of 50% (6 wins, 6 loss).

=== Sporting Cristal in the knockout stages ===
In the round of 16, they played against Argentine club Vélez Sarsfield. The first leg was played home and the teams tied 0-0. Second leg, played away in Buenos Aires, Cristal surprisingly won 1–0, advancing to the next stage.

Sporting Cristal's quarterfinal match-up was against Bolivian club Bolívar. The first leg, played in La Paz, Cristal loss 2–1. But in the second leg, played home, the Peruvian squad won 3–0, advancing to the next stage by goal difference (4–2).

In the semifinals Sporting Cristal met another Argentine club, Racing Club. In the first leg, played in Avellaneda, Cristal loss 3–2. In the second leg, played home, Cristal won 4-1 and advanced to the next stage over again by goal difference (6–4). Was the best season of a Peruvian team in Copa Libertadores.

As of the finals, Sporting Cristal has an efficacy rating of 50% (5 wins, 3 draws, 4 loss).

=== Knockout stages summary ===
Cruzeiro			Sporting Cristal	
(Ecuador) El Nacional; A **0–1**		**Round of 16**; First leg	(Argentina) Vélez Sarsfield; H **0–0**	
(Ecuador) El Nacional; H **2–1** (5–3 p)	Marcelo Ramos 61', 69'	Second leg	(Argentina) Vélez Sarsfield; A **1–0**	Jorge Soto 86'
(Brazil) Grêmio; H **2–0**	Alex Mineiro; Elivélton	**Quarterfinals**; First leg	(Bolivia) Bolívar; A **1–2**	Luis Alberto Bonnet 82'
(Brazil) Grêmio; A **1–2**	Fabinho	Second leg	(Bolivia) Bolívar; H **3–0**	Nolberto Solano 32'; Jorge Soto 57'; Prince Amoako 66'
(Chile) Colo-Colo; H **1–0**	Marcelo Ramos 6'	**Semifinals**; First leg	(Argentina) Racing Club; A **2–3**	Jorge Soto 42'; Luis Alberto Bonnet 85'
(Chile) Colo-Colo; A **2–3** (4–1 p)	Marcelo Ramos 28'; Cleison 64'	Second leg	(Argentina) Racing Club; H **4–1**	Luis Alberto Bonnet 5'; Julio Rivera 41'; Luis Alberto Bonnet 59'; Nolberto Solano 73'

== Final summary ==
=== First leg ===
6 August 1997
20:10 (UTC-5)

Sporting Cristal (Peru)	0–0	(Brazil) Cruzeiro

Estadio Nacional, Lima
Attendance: 45,000
Referee: Byron Moreno (Ecuador)

**Sporting Cristal**	**Cruzeiro**

GK	1	(Uruguay) (Peru) Julio César Balerio
DF	19	(Peru) Manuel Marengo
DF	3	(Peru) Miguel Rebosio	Substituted off
DF	2	(Argentina) Marcelo Asteggiano (c)
DF	21	(Peru) Martín Vásquez	Substituted off
MF	4	(Peru) Jorge Soto
MF	6	(Paraguay) Pedro Garay
MF	8	(Peru) Alfredo Carmona	Substituted off
MF	7	(Peru) Nolberto Solano
FW	18	(Argentina) Luis Alberto Bonnet
ST	11	(Brazil) (Peru) Julinho
Substitutes:
DF	15	(Peru) Erick Torres	Substituted on
ST	24	(Peru) Andrés Mendoza	Substituted on
MF	10	(Peru) Alex Magallanes	Substituted on
Manager:
(Uruguay) Sergio Markarián

GK	1	(Brazil) Dida
RB	2	(Brazil) Vítor
DF	16	(Brazil) Gélson Baresi
DF	22	(Brazil) Wilson Gottardo (c)
LB	6	(Brazil) Nonato
DMF	15	(Brazil) Donizete Oliveira
DMF	5	(Brazil) Fabinho
MF	8	(Brazil) Ricardinho
MF	10	(Brazil) Palhinha	Substituted off
MF	9	(Brazil) Cleisson
FW	23	(Brazil) Marcelo Ramos	Substituted off
Substitutes:
FW	19	(Brazil) Da Silva	Substituted on
FW	25	(Brazil) Tico	Substituted on
Manager:
(Brazil) Paulo Autuori

Assistant referees:
(Ecuador) Maurício Reinoso
(Ecuador) Bommer Fierro

=== Second leg ===
13 August 1997
21:45 (UTC-3)

Cruzeiro (Brazil)	1–0	(Peru) Sporting Cristal
Elivélton 75'

Mineirão, Belo Horizonte
Attendance: 95,472 (106,853)
Referee: Javier Castrilli (Argentina)

**Cruzeiro**	**Sporting Cristal**

GK	1	(Brazil) Dida
RB	2	(Brazil) Vítor
DF	16	(Brazil) Gélson Baresi
DF	22	(Brazil) Wilson Gottardo (c)
LB	6	(Brazil) Nonato
DMF	15	(Brazil) Donizete Oliveira
DMF	5	(Brazil) Fabinho
MF	8	(Brazil) Ricardinho	(substituted off) 71'
MF	10	(Brazil) Palhinha
MF	20	(Brazil) Elivélton
FW	23	(Brazil) Marcelo Ramos
Substitutes:
FW	19	(Brazil) Da Silva	(substituted on) 71'
Manager:
(Brazil) Paulo Autuori

GK	1	(Uruguay) (Peru) Julio César Balerio
DF	4	(Peru) Jorge Soto
DF	19	(Peru) Manuel Marengo
DF	2	(Argentina) Marcelo Asteggiano (c)
DF	15	(Peru) Erick Torres	(substituted off) 73'
MF	6	(Paraguay) Pedro Garay
MF	7	(Peru) Nolberto Solano
MF	16	(Peru) Julio Rivera
MF	20	(Ghana) Prince Amoako	(substituted off) 56'
FW	18	(Argentina) Luis Alberto Bonnet	(substituted off) 85'
ST	11	(Brazil) (Peru) Julinho
Substitutes:
MF	8	(Peru) Alfredo Carmona	(substituted on) 56'
DF	5	(Peru) Roger Serrano	(substituted on) 73'
FW	22	(Peru) Ismael Abrahamson	(substituted on) 85'
Manager:
(Uruguay) Sergio Markarián

Assistant referees:
(Argentina) Luis Olivetto
(Argentina) Gerardo Bertoni
