= 1991 Supercopa do Brasil =

| Corinthians | Flamengo |
| (São Paulo (state)) | (Rio de Janeiro (state)) |
| 1 | 0 |
- Date: 27 January 1991
- Venue: Estádio do Morumbi, São Paulo
- Referee: José Mocellin
- Attendance: 2,706

The 1991 Supercopa do Brasil was the 2nd Supercopa do Brasil, a football match played between the champions of the 1990 Campeonato Brasileiro Série A and 1990 Copa do Brasil.

The match was played at the Estádio do Morumbi in São Paulo on 27 January 1991.

== Qualified teams ==
| Team | Qualification |
|---|---|
| (São Paulo (state)) Corinthians | 1990 Campeonato Brasileiro Série A champions |
| (Rio de Janeiro (state)) Flamengo | 1990 Copa do Brasil champions |

== Match ==
=== Details ===
27 January 1991

| Corinthians (São Paulo (state)) | 1–0 | (Rio de Janeiro (state)) Flamengo |
|---|---|---|
| Neto 70' | Report (Fla Estatística); Report (Meu Timão) |

Morumbi, São Paulo
Attendance: 2,706
Referee: José Mocellin (Rio Grande do Sul)

| Corinthians | Flamengo |

| GK | 1 | (Brazil) Ronaldo | (yellow card) 39' |
| DF | 2 | (Brazil) Giba |
| DF | 3 | (Brazil) Marcelo Djian |
| DF | 6 | (Brazil) Guinei | (yellow card) 24' |
| DF | 4 | (Brazil) Jacenir |
| MF | 5 | (Brazil) Márcio |
| MF | 8 | (Brazil) Tupãzinho | (substituted off) 45' |
| MF | 7 | (Brazil) Fabinho | (yellow card) 40' |
| MF | 10 | (Brazil) Neto (c) | (yellow card) 63' |
| FW | 9 | (Brazil) Paulo Sérgio | (yellow card) 48' |
| FW | 11 | (Brazil) Mauro | (substituted off) 83' |
Substitutes:
| MF | 14 | (Brazil) Ezequiel | (substituted in) 83' |
| DF | 16 | (Brazil) Edson | (substituted in) 45' |
Manager:
(Brazil) Nelsinho Baptista

| GK | 1 | (Brazil) Zé Carlos |
| DF | 2 | (Brazil) Aílton |
| DF | 3 | (Brazil) Adílson |
| DF | 4 | (Brazil) Rogério |
| DF | 6 | (Brazil) Piá Carioca |
| MF | 5 | (Brazil) Júnior (c) |
| MF | 8 | (Brazil) Uidemar |
| MF | 10 | (Brazil) Marcelinho | (yellow card) 50' |
| FW | 7 | (Brazil) Alcindo | (yellow card) 11' (substituted off) 69' |
| FW | 11 | (Brazil) Zinho | (yellow card) 74' |
| FW | 9 | (Brazil) Nélio |
Substitutes:
| MF | 15 | (Brazil) Djalminha | (substituted in) 69' |
Manager:
(Brazil) Vanderlei Luxemburgo
