= 1995 Supercopa Libertadores finals =

1995 Supercopa Libertadores Finals
- Event: 1995 Supercopa Libertadores
Independiente	Flamengo
(Argentina)	(Brazil)
2	1
- (on aggregate)

First leg
Independiente	Flamengo
2	0
- Date: November 29, 1993
- Venue: Independiente Stadium, Avellaneda
- Referee: Salvator Imperatore (Chile)

Second leg
Flamengo	Independiente
1	0
- Date: December 6, 1995
- Venue: Maracanã Stadium, Rio de Janeiro
- Referee: Epifanio González (Uruguay)

The 1995 Supercopa Libertadores Finals was a two-legged football series to determine the winner of the 1995 Supercopa Libertadores. The finals were contested by Argentine Independiente and Brazilian team Flamengo in November–December 1995.

In the first leg, held in Independiente Stadium in Avellaneda, the local team beat Flamengo 2–0. In the second leg, held in Maracanã Stadium in Rio de Janeiro, Flamengo beat Independiente 1–0. As a result, Independiente won the series 2–1 on aggregate, becoming Supercopa Libertadores champion for second time.

== Qualified teams ==
Team	Previous finals app.
(Argentina) Independiente	1989, **1994**
(Brazil) Flamengo	1993

Bold indicates winning years

== Venues ==
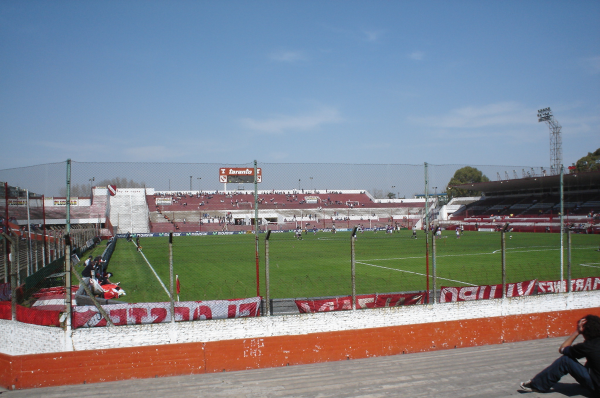
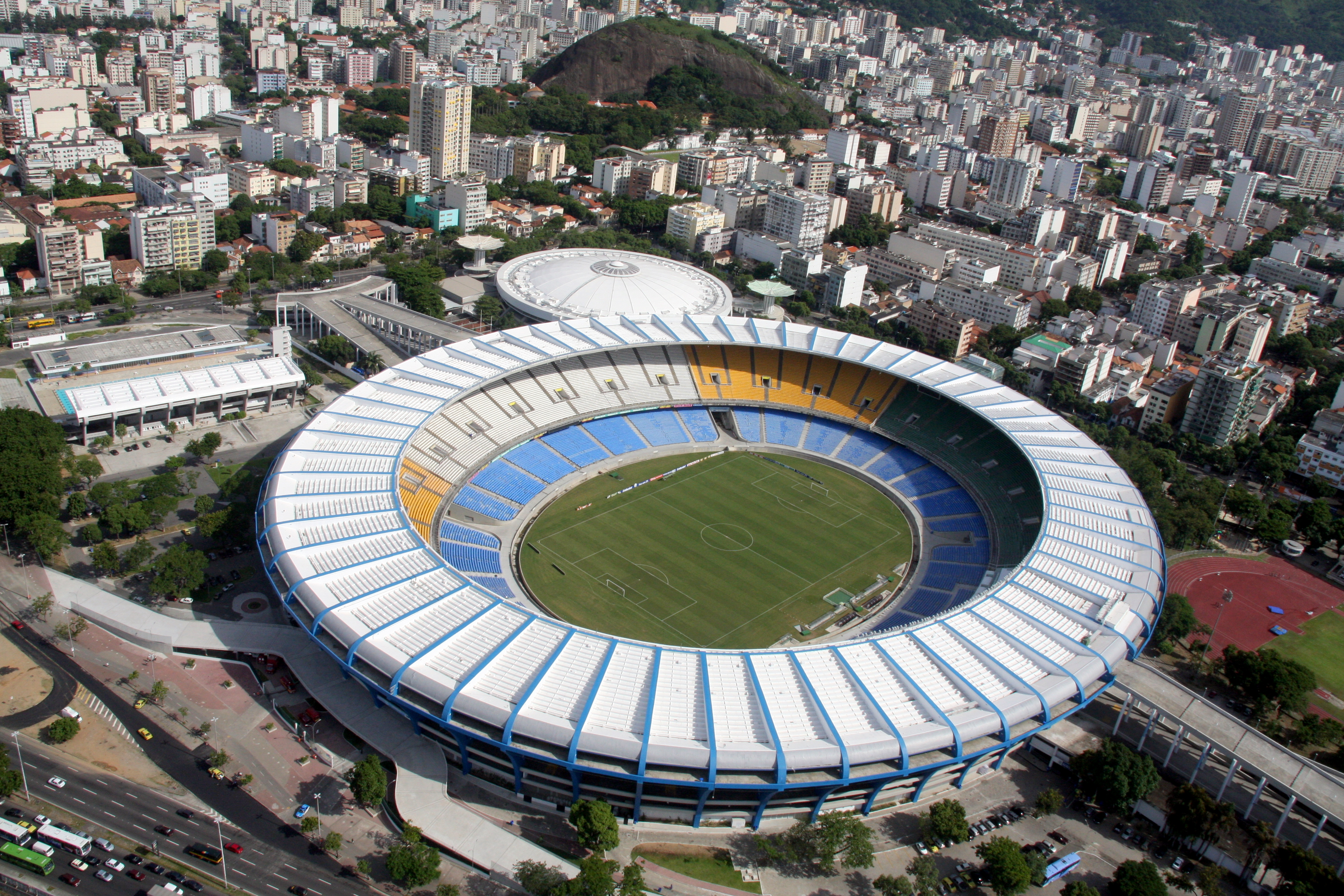
Independiente Stadium (left) and Maracanã, venues for the series

== Road to the final ==
(Argentina) Independiente					(Argentina) Flamengo			
Opponent	Agg.	1st leg	2nd leg	Round	Opponent	Agg.	1st leg	2nd leg
(Brazil) Santos	3–3 (3–2 p)	1–1 (H)	2–2 (A)	Preliminary round	(Argentina) Vélez Sarsfield	6–2	3–2 (A)	3–0 (H)
(Colombia) Atlético Nacional	2–1	0–1 (A)	2–0 (H)	Quarter-finals	(Uruguay) Nacional	2–0	1–0 (A)	1–0 (H)
(Argentina) River Plate	2–2 (4–1 p)	2–2 (H)	0–0 (A)	Semi-finals	(Brazil) Cruzeiro	4–1	1–0 (A)	3–1 (H)

== Match details ==
=== First leg ===
November 29, 1995
First leg

Independiente (Argentina)	2–0	(Brazil) Flamengo
Javier Mazzoni 38'; Domizzi 72'

Independiente Stadium, Avellaneda
Referee: Salvador Imperatore (Chile)

**Independiente**
**Flamengo**

GK	1	(Colombia) Faryd Mondragón
RB	17	(Argentina) Néstor Clausen (c)
CB	2	(Argentina) Pablo Rotchen
CB	15	(Argentina) Carlos Bustos
LB	24	(Argentina) Cristian Domizzi
DM	6	(Argentina) José Serrizuela
MF	22	(Argentina) Roberto Molina
MF	8	(Argentina) Diego Cagna	(substituted off) 79'
AM	7	(Argentina) Gustavo López
FW	20	(Uruguay) Gabriel Alvez	(substituted off) 63'
FW	9	(Argentina) Javier Mazzoni
Substitutes:
MF	16	(Argentina) Jorge Burruchaga	(substituted on) 63'
MF		(Paraguay) Roberto Acuña	(substituted on) 79'
Manager:
(Argentina) Miguel Ángel López

GK	1	(Brazil) Paulo César
RB	2	(Brazil) Fabiano
CB	1	(Brazil) Claudio
CB	4	(Brazil) Ronaldão
LB	6	(Brazil) Lira
DM	16	(Brazil) Márcio Costa
MF	8	(Brazil) Marquinhos (c)
MF	9	(Brazil) Djair
AM	19	(Brazil) Nélio	(substituted off) 77'
FW	10	(Brazil) Sávio	(substituted off) 77'
CF	11	(Brazil) Romário
Substitutes:
FW	15	(Brazil) Ueslei	(substituted on) 77'
DM		(Brazil) Pingo	(substituted on) 77'
Manager:
(Brazil) Vanderlei Luxemburgo

=== Second leg ===
December 6, 1995
Second leg

Flamengo (Brazil)	1–0	(Argentina) Independiente
Romário 62'

Maracanã Stadium, Rio de Janeiro
Attendance: 105,000
Referee: Epifanio González (Uruguay)

**Flamengo**	**Independiente**

GK	1	(Brazil) Paulo César
DF	3	(Brazil) Cláudio		(substituted off) 45'
DF	4	(Brazil) Ronaldão
DF	6	(Brazil) Lira
RM	19	(Brazil) Nélio	(red card) 63'
DM	16	(Brazil) Márcio Costa
MF	8	(Brazil) Marquinhos
MF	9	(Brazil) Djair	Yellow card
LM	17	(Brazil) Rodrigo Mendes	Yellow card	(substituted off) 76'
FW	10	(Brazil) Sávio
CF	11	(Brazil) Romário (c)
Substitutes:
FW	15	(Brazil) Uéslei		(substituted on) 76'
FW	18	(Brazil) Aloísio		(substituted on) 45'
Manager:
(Brazil) Vanderlei Luxemburgo

GK	1	(Colombia) Farid Mondragón	Yellow card
RB	17	(Argentina) Néstor Clausen (c)	Yellow card
CB	2	(Argentina) Pablo Rotchen
CB	15	(Argentina) Carlos Bustos
LB	24	(Argentina) Cristian Domizzi	(red card) 63'
DM	6	(Argentina) José Serrizuela	Yellow card
MF	22	(Argentina) Roberto Molina
MF	8	(Argentina) Diego Cagna
AM	7	(Argentina) Gustavo López	Yellow card	(substituted off) 81'
FW	20	(Uruguay) Gabriel Álvez		(substituted off) 65'
FW	9	(Argentina) Javier Mazzoni	Yellow card
Substitutes:
CB	23	(Argentina) Marcelo Kobistyj		(substituted on) 65'
MF	16	(Argentina) Jorge Burruchaga		(substituted on) 81'
Manager:
(Argentina) Miguel Ángel López
