= Dinei (footballer, born 1970) =

Brazilian footballer

Personal information
- Full name: Claudinei Alexandre Pires
- Date of birth: 10 September 1970 (age 56)
- Place of birth: São Paulo (SP)
- Height: 1.86 m (6 ft 1 in)
- Position: Striker

Senior career*
Years	Team	Apps	(Gls)
1990–1992	Corinthians		
1992	Guarani		
1992	Grasshoppers		
1993	Portuguesa		
1994	Internacional		
1995–1997	Cruzeiro		
1996	→ Coritiba (loan)		
1997	→ Inter de Limeira (loan)		
1997	→ Guarani (loan)		
1998–2001	Corinthians		
2002	Santo André		
2003–2004	Portuguesa Santista		

International career
1992	Brazil U23		
- * Club domestic league appearances and goals

Claudinei Alexandre Pires, or simply Dinei (born 10 September 1970 in São Paulo), is a former striker who played for several Brazilian football clubs.

Playing for Corinthians, he made club history as the only player to win three Brazilian championships in 1990, 1998, 1999.

== Honours ==
Corinthians

- Campeonato Brasileiro Série A: 1990, 1998, 1999
- FIFA Club World Championship: 2000
- Copa do Brasil: 2002
- Supercopa do Brasil: 1991
- Campeonato Paulista: 1999

Internacional

- Campeonato Gaúcho: 1994

Cruzeiro

- Copa de Oro: 1995
- Campeonato Mineiro: 1996

== Realitys Show ==
- A Fazenda 4
- A Fazenda 9
- Ilha Record 1
- Power Couple (Brazilian season 6)
