= Julio Rivera =

Julio Rivera may refer to:

- Julio Rivera (footballer), Peruvian footballer
- Julio Adalberto Rivera Carballo, president of El Salvador
- Murder of Julio Rivera, 1990 hate crime where a gay 29-year old man was murdered in the Jackson Heights neighborhood in New York City
