= 1996 Campeonato Nacional Primera División =

Campeonato Nacional Copa Banco del Estado
- Dates: 16 March – 24 November 1996
- Champions: Colo-Colo (20th title)
- Relegated: Regional Atacama; O'Higgins
- 1997 Copa Libertadores: Colo-Colo; Universidad Católica (Liguilla winners)
- 1996 Copa CONMEBOL: Cobreloa (Play-off winners)
- Matches: 240
- Goals: 769 (3.2 per match)
- Top goalscorer: Mario Véner (30)
- Biggest home win: Unión Española 7–0 Regional Atacama (27 August)
- Highest attendance: 58,051 Colo-Colo 1–1 Audax Italiano (11 November)
- Total attendance: 1,698,008
- Average attendance: 7,075

The 1996 Campeonato Nacional, known as Campeonato Nacional Copa Banco del Estado 1996 for sponsorship purposes, was the 64th season of top-flight football in Chile. Colo-Colo won their 20th title following a 1–1 home draw against Audax Italiano on 11 November. Universidad Católica also qualified for the next Copa Libertadores as Liguilla winners.

== Final table ==
Pos	Team	Pld	W	D	L	GF	GA	GD	Pts	Qualification or relegation
1	Colo-Colo	30	19	6	5	62	24	+38	63	Champions and qualified for the 1997 Copa Libertadores
2	Universidad Católica	30	17	8	5	70	40	+30	59	Qualified for the Liguilla Pre-Copa Libertadores
3	Cobreloa	30	15	6	9	58	44	+14	51	Qualified for the Liguilla Pre-Copa Libertadores
4	Audax Italiano	30	14	9	7	51	38	+13	51	Qualified for the Liguilla Pre-Copa Libertadores
5	Universidad de Chile	30	13	8	9	49	42	+7	47	Qualified for the Liguilla Pre-Copa Libertadores
6	Provincial Osorno	30	11	10	9	54	40	+14	43	
7	Deportes Antofagasta	30	12	7	11	47	46	+1	43	
8	Unión Española	30	11	7	12	43	47	−4	40	
9	Coquimbo Unido	30	12	4	14	46	53	−7	40	
10	Deportes Concepción	30	8	15	7	44	53	−9	39	
11	Santiago Wanderers	30	10	7	13	49	57	−8	37	
12	Huachipato	30	8	11	11	42	46	−4	35	
13	Palestino	30	8	9	13	40	53	−13	33	Promotion/relegation play-offs
14	Deportes Temuco	30	8	4	18	35	55	−20	28	Promotion/relegation play-offs
15	Regional Atacama	30	7	6	17	38	70	−32	27	Relegated to Segunda División
16	O'Higgins	30	5	7	18	41	61	−20	22	Relegated to Segunda División

Primera División de Chile
1996 champion
Colo-Colo
20th title

== Results ==
Home \ Away	DAN	RAT	AUD	CLO	COL	DCO	COQ	HUA	OHI	POS	PAL	DTE	UCA	UCH	UES	SWA
Antofagasta		1–0	0–2	0–0	4–2	3–0	2–3	0–0	1–0	1–2	1–1	2–1	1–0	2–2	2–0	6–0
Atacama	1–1		2–3	3–1	0–0	2–0	4–1	1–0	3–1	0–1	2–2	1–2	0–2	2–2	2–0	0–5
Audax	1–2	2–1		2–0	1–3	2–2	5–1	0–0	3–2	2–0	0–1	1–1	0–0	1–2	2–1	1–1
Cobreloa	1–2	5–1	3–0		3–0	4–3	1–0	6–2	3–1	1–1	5–1	3–0	4–4	0–0	5–0	2–1
Colo-Colo	2–1	4–1	1–1	0–1		7–1	3–0	1–0	1–0	1–0	4–2	0–0	3–1	0–1	2–0	3–0
Concepción	2–1	5–1	2–0	1–1	1–1		0–0	4–2	1–1	0–5	3–0	3–2	0–0	1–1	0–0	0–0
Coquimbo	3–1	2–2	1–3	3–0	0–1	2–1		1–1	3–0	2–1	2–1	0–1	4–3	2–5	2–1	2–1
Huachipato	1–1	5–0	1–1	1–2	1–0	2–2	1–0		2–1	1–1	3–2	0–1	3–3	2–3	0–1	2–2
O'Higgins	2–1	2–2	0–2	1–2	0–5	2–2	2–1	4–0		1–1	1–1	5–1	1–1	4–1	2–3	1–2
Osorno	1–1	3–2	2–2	4–0	0–2	1–1	1–2	1–1	4–1		2–2	2–2	1–1	2–0	3–0	6–1
Palestino	1–2	1–2	2–4	1–0	1–1	1–1	3–1	0–4	1–1	4–0		2–0	1–3	0–3	2–2	2–1
Temuco	3–0	2–1	0–2	1–2	0–1	1–2	2–2	0–1	4–2	0–2	0–1		0–1	1–2	1–1	3–1
U. Católica	5–1	2–0	3–2	3–0	3–3	6–0	2–1	4–2	2–0	4–3	1–0	5–2		0–3	3–1	1–1
U. Chile	1–2	4–1	0–0	1–1	0–2	2–3	1–0	1–3	4–2	1–0	1–0	0–1	2–5		1–1	1–2
U. Española	6–4	7–0	1–2	3–0	0–5	1–1	3–2	1–1	3–1	2–1	1–2	2–0	1–0	0–0		1–0
S. Wanderers	3–1	4–1	3–4	4–2	0–0	2–2	1–3	2–0	1–0	2–3	2–2	4–2	0–2	2–4	1–0	

Legend: Blue = home team win; Yellow = draw; Red = away team win.

== Top goalscorers ==
Pos	Name	Team	Goals
1	(Chile) Mario Véner	Santiago Wanderers	30
2	(Chile) Sebastian Rozental	Universidad Católica	24
3	(Chile) Ivo Basay	Colo-Colo	18
4	(Uruguay) Sergio Vásquez	Deportes Antofagasta	16
	(Chile) Pedro González V.	Cobreloa	16
6	(Chile) Jaime Riveros	Cobreloa	14
7	(Paraguay) Hugo Brizuela	Audax Italiano	13
	(Chile) Fernando Vergara	Colo-Colo	13
	(Chile) Marcelo Corrales	Provincial Osorno	13
10	(Chile) Juan Carreño	Deportes Concepción	12

== Liguilla Pre-Copa Libertadores ==
=== Semifinals ===
30 November 1996	Audax Italiano	3 – 1	Cobreloa	Estadio Municipal de La Florida
	Brizuela 2'; Illesca 51'; Delgado 82'		44' Cornejo	Attendance: 2,853; Referee: C. Robles

1 December 1996	Universidad de Chile	1 – 2	Universidad Católica	Estadio Nacional
	C. Castañeda 57'		68' A. González; 75' Rozental	Attendance: 24,765; Referee: G. Aros

4 December 1996	Cobreloa	3 – 1 (8–7 p)	Audax Italiano	Estadio Municipal de Calama
	Tapia 56'; Silva 60'; M. Rojas 68'		76' Brizuela	Attendance: 2,178; Referee: E. Gamboa

5 December 1996	Universidad Católica	5 – 2	Universidad de Chile	Estadio Nacional
	Rozental 24' (pen.); A. González 36', 43', 61', 87' (pen.)		17', 53' V. Castañeda	Attendance: 16,378; Referee: M. Sánchez

=== Finals ===
8 December 1996	Cobreloa	3 – 2	Universidad Católica	Estadio Municipal de Calama
	Guerrero 29'; Riveros 57', 87'		8', 73' Lunari	Attendance: 7,275; Referee: E. Gamboa

18 December 1996	Universidad Católica	3 – 2 (4 – 2 p)	Cobreloa	Estadio San Carlos de Apoquindo
	Lunari 21'; Rozental 66', 74',		80' P. González; 90' Cornejo	Attendance: 18,031; Referee: E. Marín
	Penalties
	Lepe (penalty scored); Rozental (penalty missed); Lunari (penalty scored); Catê (penalty scored); R. Gómez (penalty scored)		(penalty scored) Riveros; (penalty missed) Cornejo; (penalty missed) Silva; (penalty scored) P. González

Universidad Católica qualified for the 1997 Copa Libertadores

== Copa CONMEBOL 1996 play-off ==
Goal difference didn't count; in case of equal points, extra time was played.

24 August 1996	Cobresal	2 – 0	Cobreloa	Estadio El Cobre
	Troncoso 24' (pen.); Jorquera 56'			Attendance: 1,000; Referee: G. Aros

31 August 1996	Cobreloa	7 – 1 (a.e.t.)	Cobresal	Estadio Municipal de Calama
	P. González 11', 17', 27', 45'; Sandoval 20' (o.g.); Riveros 55' (pen.); Vásquez 119'		90' Garrido	Attendance: 1,435; Referee: M. Peña

Cobreloa qualified for the 1996 Copa CONMEBOL

== Promotion/relegation play-offs ==
1 December 1996	Cobresal	3 – 1	Deportes Temuco	Estadio El Cobre
	Rivera 57'; Salgado 20'; Garrido 73'		Alvarez 79'	Attendance: 4,110; Referee: Salvador Imperatore

1 December 1996	Deportes Iquique	1 – 0	Palestino	Estadio Tierra de Campeones
	Donoso 17'			Attendance: 7,152; Referee: Enrique Marín

8 December 1996	Deportes Temuco	2 – 0	Cobresal	Estadio Germán Becker
	Castillo 27'; Poirrier 30'			Attendance: 13,089; Referee: Mariano Peña

8 December 1996	Palestino	5 – 1	Deportes Iquique	Estadio Municipal de La Cisterna
	Castillo 8', 14'; Lizana 52'; Córdova 73', 90'		Donoso 88'	Attendance: 4,500; Referee: Iván Guerrero

== See also ==
- 1996 Copa Chile
