= Ronaldo Giovanelli =

Brazilian footballer

Personal information
- Full name: Ronaldo Soares Giovanelli
- Date of birth: 20 November 1967 (age 58)
- Place of birth: São Paulo, Brazil
- Height: 1.88 m (6 ft 2 in)
- Position: Goalkeeper

Youth career
- 1979–1986: Corinthians

Senior career*
Years	Team	Apps	(Gls)
1986–1998	Corinthians	602	(0)
1998	Fluminense	9	(0)
1999	Internacional-SP	0	(0)
1999–2000	Cruzeiro		
2000–2001	Portuguesa	2	(0)
2001	Gama	26	(0)
2002	Ponte Preta	0	(0)
2003	Portuguesa Santista		
2003	ABC		
2004	Metropolitano		
2004–2005	Portuguesa Santista		

International career
1993	Brazil	1	(0)
- * Club domestic league appearances and goals

Ronaldo Soares Giovanelli (born 20 November 1967) is a Brazilian football pundit and former goalkeeper. He was a long-standing player of Corinthians in the late 1980s and into the 1990s.

== Club career ==
Ronaldo began his career in 1979. Originally a forward, he was intimidated by the large pool of youths fighting for attacking positions that day and decided to try his luck as a goalkeeper, as he had already brought gloves with him. After impressing at junior levels, Ronaldo was eventually brought to the first team originally as a backup. He made his professional debut in a goalless friendly against São José EC in 1988. During that year's Campeonato Paulista, he saved a penalty kick from Darío Pereyra in the derby against São Paulo FC, cementing his place as the starting goalkeeper for the team.

As a player, Ronaldo was notorious for his physicality and for not being afraid of charging an incoming attacker.

A fundamental player in the 1990 Corinthians' Campeonato Brasileiro title win, and in 1994's defeat in the finals against SE Palmeiras, Ronaldo earned the Bola de Plata award from Placar magazine for best goalkeeper in both of these years. He left the club in 1998, by the order of then coach Vanderlei Luxemburgo, who sought to "renew" the club after the near relegation in 1997. Ronaldo played 602 times for Corinthians, being the team's third most capped player.

After being released by Corinthians, he played for many other clubs with nowhere near the success he enjoyed with Corinthians. He was a part of the Fluminense squad that was relegated from Série B to Série C in 1998. He retired from professional football in 2005.

== Music career ==
While still playing for Corinthians, Ronaldo was the lead singer of the band Ronaldo e os Impedidos ("Ronaldo and the Offsiders"). After releasing two records, the band broke up. They returned in 2010 for the Corinthians' 100th anniversary festivities, and have been active since, playing both original music and covering songs from bands such as Megadeth, and artists like Raul Seixas and Elvis Presley. Ronaldo is also a radio host for Kiss FM.

== Personal life ==
Ronaldo is married and a father of two sons.

He has alopecia areata, which caused him to lose most of his hair.

== Honours ==
=== Club ===
Corinthians

- Campeonato Paulista: 1988, 1995, 1997
- Campeonato Brasileiro: 1990
- Supercopa do Brasil: 1991
- Copa Bandeirantes: 1994
- Copa do Brasil: 1995

Brazil

- Copa America runner-up: 1991

=== Individual ===
- Bola de Prata: 1990, 1994
