= 1993 Supercopa Libertadores =

1993 Supercopa Libertadores João Havelange

Tournament details
- Dates: October 6 – November 24
- Teams: 16 (from 6 confederations)

Final positions
- Champions: (Brazil) São Paulo (1st title)
- Runners-up: (Brazil) Flamengo

Tournament statistics
- Matches played: 30
- Goals scored: 81 (2.7 per match)
- Top scorer(s): (Brazil) Ronaldo (8 goals)

The 1993 Supercopa Libertadores was the sixth season of the Supercopa Libertadores, a club football tournament for past Copa Libertadores winners. The tournament was won by São Paulo, who beat Flamengo 5–4 in a penalty shootout after a 4–4 aggregate draw in the final.

== First round ==
The matches were played from 6 October to 13 October.

Team 1	Agg.	Team 2	1st leg	2nd leg
Cruzeiro (Brazil)	9–4	(Chile) Colo-Colo	6–1	3–3
Nacional (Uruguay)	4–2	(Argentina) Racing	1–1	3–1
Olimpia (Paraguay)	2–4	(Brazil) Flamengo	1–0	1–3
River Plate (Argentina)	4–2	(Argentina) Argentinos Juniors	2–1	2–1
Estudiantes (Argentina)	5–1	(Argentina) Boca Juniors	2–0	3–1
Santos (Brazil)	0–1	(Colombia) Atlético Nacional	0–0	0–1
Peñarol (Uruguay)	1–2	(Brazil) Grêmio	1–0	0–2
São Paulo (Brazil)	3–1	(Argentina) Independiente	2–0	1–1

== Quarter finals ==
The matches were played from 20 October to 27 October.

Team 1	Agg.	Team 2	1st leg	2nd leg
Cruzeiro (Brazil)	4–4 (2–4 p)	(Uruguay) Nacional	1–2	3–2
River Plate (Argentina)	2–2 (5–6 p)	(Brazil) Flamengo	2–1	0–1
Atlético Nacional (Colombia)	2–0	(Argentina) Estudiantes	1–0	1–0
São Paulo (Brazil)	3–2	(Brazil) Grêmio	2–2	1–0

== Semi-finals ==
The matches were played from 3 November to 10 November.

Team 1	Agg.	Team 2	1st leg	2nd leg
Flamengo (Brazil)	5–1	(Uruguay) Nacional	2–1	3–0
São Paulo (Brazil)	2–2 (5–4 p)	(Colombia) Atlético Nacional	1–0	1–2

== Final ==
=== First leg ===
November 17, 1993

Flamengo (Brazil)	2–2	(Brazil) São Paulo
Marquinhos 35', 46'		Leonardo 15'; Juninho 86'

Rio de Janeiro, Maracanã
Referee: Márcio Rezende de Freitas (Brazil)

=== Second leg ===
November 24, 1993

São Paulo (Brazil)	2–2	(Brazil) Flamengo
Leonardo 61'; Juninho 79'		Renato Gaúcho 9'; Marquinhos 81'
Penalties
Dinho (penalty scored); Leonardo (penalty scored); Cafu (penalty scored); André Luiz (penalty scored); Muller (penalty scored)	5–3	(penalty scored) Rogério; (penalty missed) Marcelinho; (penalty scored) Marquinhos; (penalty scored) Gélson

São Paulo, Morumbi
Attendance: 65,355
Referee: Renato Marsiglia (Brazil)

== See also ==
- 1993 Copa Libertadores
