= Jura (Brazilian footballer) =

Brazilian footballer

Personal information
- Full name: Jurandir Fatori
- Date of birth: 12 June 1971 (age 55)
- Place of birth: São Paulo, Brazil
- Height: 1.76 m (5 ft 9 in)
- Position: Right back

Youth career
- –1989: Guarani

Senior career*
Years	Team	Apps	(Gls)
1989–1991	Guarani		
1991–1992	Remo		
1992–1993	São Paulo	20	(1)
1994	Guarani		
1994	Flamengo	7	(0)
1995	Bahia		
1995	Novorizontino		
1996–1997	Araçatuba		
1997	Matonense		
1997	XV de Piracicaba		
1998	Inter de Limeira		
1999	Paysandu		
2000	União São João		
2000	Avaí		
2001–2003	XV de Piracicaba		

Managerial career
- 2013: Guaçuano
- 2014: São José-SP
- 2014: Guaçuano
- 2015: Rio Claro
- * Club domestic league appearances and goals as of 28 September 2023

Jurandir Fatori (born 12 June 1971), better known as Jura, is a Brazilian former professional footballer and manager, who played as a right back.

== Career ==
Jura started his career at Guarani FC. His peak was playing for São Paulo FC. At the end of 1994, he still played in some games for Flamengo. On 13 February 1999, he was caught for doping, while playing for Inter de Limeira. After his test came back positive, he was dismissed from the club.

== Personal life ==
Years after retiring, he tried a career as a manager, but didn't succeed. In 2023, he declared personal bankruptcy due to debts.

== Honours ==
São Paulo

- Intercontinental Cup: 1993
- Supercopa Libertadores: 1993
