= Gaúcho (footballer, born 1964) =

Brazilian footballer, manager, and club president

Personal information
- Full name: Luís Carlos Tóffoli
- Date of birth: 7 March 1964
- Place of birth: Canoas, Brazil
- Date of death: 17 March 2016 (aged 52)
- Place of death: São Paulo, Brazil
- Position: Centre forward

Youth career
- 1982–1984: Flamengo

Senior career*
Years	Team	Apps	(Gls)
1984	Grêmio		
1985	Atlético Goianiense		
1986	XV de Piracicaba		
1987–1988	Santo André		
1988–1989	Palmeiras	40	(15)
1990–1993	Flamengo	44	(22)
1993	Lecce	5	(0)
1994	Boca Juniors	2	(0)
1994	Atlético Mineiro	10	(1)
1995	Ponte Preta		
1995	Fluminense	11	(1)

Managerial career
- 2001–2002: Cuiabá
- 2003–2004: Cuiabá (assistant)
- 2010: Mixto
- 2011: Luverdense
- * Club domestic league appearances and goals

Luís Carlos Tóffoli, usually nicknamed Gaúcho (7 March 1964 – 17 March 2016), was a Brazilian football player (centre forward), manager and club president.

== Career ==
Gaúcho was born in Canoas, Rio Grande do Sul. After spending his youth years at Rio de Janeiro club Flamengo, he began his professional career in 1984 at Grêmio. The following year he transferred to Atlético Goianiense. In 1986, he played for XV de Piracicaba, then a year later he moved to Santo André where he stayed until mid-1988.

From 1988 to 1989 he played for Palmeiras. On 17 November 1988, during a Campeonato Brasileiro Série A match against Flamengo, he was selected as replacement goalkeeper after Zetti suffered an injury. The match ended 1–1 after regular time; during the penalty shootout Gaúcho saved two Flamengo penalties, and Palmeiras won 5–4.

In 1990, he returned to his youth club, signing a three-year deal with Flamengo. There he won the 1990 Copa do Brasil, the 1991 Rio State Championship and the 1992 Série A. During this period he played 198 matches and scored 98 goals. At the end of his contract he joined Italian Serie A side Lecce, where he failed to make a breakthrough with only five games played. He left the club halfway through the season and signed with Boca Juniors, where once again he failed to repeat his good performances.

Back in Brazil, he joined Atlético Mineiro in 1994 where he played once again alongside his good friend Renato Gaúcho. In the following year, his last as a professional footballer, he played for Ponte Preta and Fluminense.

=== Cuiabá Esporte Clube ===
In 2001, he founded the football club Cuiabá Esporte Clube. He was the club's first president and manager in the amateur era.

== Death ==
Gaúcho died on 17 March 2016.

== Honors and achievements ==
- Brazil Cup - 1990
- Rio State Championship - 1991
- Rio State Championship top goalscorer (17 goals) - 1991
- Copa Libertadores top goalscorer (8 goals) - 1991
- Série A - 1992
