= Tico (footballer, born 1976) =

Brazilian footballer

Personal information
- Full name: Emerson Henrique Alves
- Date of birth: 12 December 1976 (age 49)
- Place of birth: Estrela do Sul, Brazil
- Position: Forward

Youth career
- Uberlândia

Senior career*
Years	Team	Apps	(Gls)
1991–1996	Uberlândia		
1995	→ Atlético Paranaense (loan)		
1996	→ Atlético Goianiense (loan)		
1996–1998	Cruzeiro	21	(2)
1999	Ypiranga-RS		
1999–2000	Desportiva-ES		
2000	Mamoré		
2000–2001	CRB		
2001–2002	Fortaleza		
2002–2003	Criciúma		
2005	Gama		
- * Club domestic league appearances and goals as of 26 October 2023

Emerson Henrique Alves (born 12 December 1976), better known as Tico, is a Brazilian former professional footballer who played as a forward.

== Career ==
Revealed at Uberlândia EC, Tico was part of the 1997 Copa Libertadores champion squad with Cruzeiro EC. He played for several clubs in Brazil.

In 2002, he was almost mistakenly hired by Coritiba FBC, which was targeting Tico Mineiro as a reinforcement.

== Honours ==
Athletico Paranaense

- Campeonato Brasileiro Série B: 1995

Cruzeiro

- Copa Libertadores: 1997
- Campeonato Mineiro: 1997

Desportiva

- Campeonato Capixaba: 2000

Mamoré

- Campeonato Mineiro Módulo II: 2000
