= José Serrizuela =

Argentine footballer

Personal information
- Full name: José Tiburcio Serrizuela
- Date of birth: 10 June 1962 (age 64)
- Place of birth: Palo, Argentina
- Height: 1.80 m (5 ft 11 in)
- Position: Defender

Senior career*
Years	Team	Apps	(Gls)
1980–1984	Los Andes	153	(23)
1985	Rosario Central	41	(7)
1986	Lanús	19	(4)
1986–1988	Racing de Córdoba	74	(6)
1988–1990	River Plate	45	(7)
1990	Cruz Azul	?	(?)
1991	Veracruz	?	(?)
1991–1992	Huracán	24	(2)
1993–1996	Independiente	69	(2)
1996–1997	Racing Club	15	(2)
1997–1998	Talleres de Córdoba	32	(3)
1998–2000	Los Andes		
Total		475	(56)

International career
1990	Argentina	8	(0)
- * Club domestic league appearances and goals as of June 2008

José Tiburcio Serrizuela (born 10 June 1962) is an Argentine former footballer who played as a defender. His nickname is El Tiburón (The Shark).

== Career ==
=== Early years ===
Born in Palo, Tucumán Province, Serrizuela started his career with Los Andes in the Argentine 2nd division in 1980. He played for the club until his transfer to Rosario Central in 1985, he then had a spell with Club Atlético Lanús in 1986.

=== 1986-1997 ===
Serrizuela joined Racing de Córdoba of the Primera División Argentina in 1986 and played for the club until he joined River Plate in 1988. He was part of the River squad that won the 1989-1990 championship, and on the back of this success he was selected to play for the Argentina national football team in the 1990 World Cup. Afterwards he moved to Mexico to play for Cruz Azul and Veracruz.

In 1992, Serrizuela returned to Argentina where he played one season for Club Atlético Huracán before joining Club Atlético Independiente where he was part of the squad that won the Clausura 1994 championship. In 1996, he joined Independiente's hated local rivals Racing Club de Avellaneda.

=== Later years ===
In 1997, Serrizuela dropped down a division to play for Talleres de Córdoba. He helped them to win the 1997–98 Primera B Nacional title and promotion to the Primera before returning to his boyhood club Los Andes where he played until his retirement in 2000.

== Honours ==
=== Club ===
Rosario Central

- Primera B: 1985

River Plate

- Primera División Argentina: 1989–90

Independiente

- Primera División Argentina: 1994 Clausura
- Recopa Sudamericana: 1995
- Supercopa Libertadores: 1995

Talleres

- Primera B Nacional: 1997–98

Argentina

- FIFA World Cup runner-up: 1990
