= Ricardo Cruz (Brazilian footballer) =

Brazilian footballer

Personal information
- Full name: Ricardo da Cruz Cerqueira
- Date of birth: May 19, 1962 (age 64)
- Place of birth: Rio de Janeiro (RJ); Brazil
- Position: Goalkeeper

Team information
- Current team: Nova Iguaçu (assistant)

Youth career
- 1985–1986: Olaria

Senior career*
Years	Team	Apps	(Gls)
1986–1987	Fluminense		
1988–1992	Botafogo		
1993	Ponte Preta		
1994	Fluminense		
1995	América		
1996	Olaria		

Managerial career
- 2015–2016: América
- 2017–: Nova Iguaçu (assistant)
- * Club domestic league appearances and goals

Ricardo da Cruz Cerqueira, usually known as Ricardo Cruz (born May 19, 1962 in Rio de Janeiro), is a Brazilian football manager and former goalkeeper.

== Coaching career ==
Cruz began his career as a goalkeeper at Olaria and came through the youth system of Fluminense, where he won several titles with the reserve team while still a teenager. He was then signed by Botafogo, winning the 1989 and 1990 titles and ending a title drought of about 20 years. He stayed at Botafogo until the end of the 1992 Campeonato Brasileiro Série A, in which the club faced Flamengo in the final. He later played for Ponte Preta, returned to Fluminense, and played for America before ending his career at Olaria around 1995.

Cruz then became a goalkeeping coach, again starting in Fluminense's youth categories, where he won many titles, from the mirim to the junior level. He reached the professional team, but stayed there for a short time.

Soon after it has forwarded to the foundations of the Brazilian selection, working together with the technician Nelson Rodriguez 2002 until 2007, Ali managed many titles since U-17 and U-20. In July 2007 received a proposal to work in the Arab world, as trainer of goalkeepers of Al Nasr U-18 in Dubai, United Arab Emirates and in the years of 2014 and 2015, worked in this same function in America, was invited to be coach after the resignation of unexpected Arturzinho and immediately at the beginning of the career of technical, rising the club after five years the First Division of the Campeonato Carioca and consequentemente the title in the Série B and after being consummated as coach.

== Honours ==
=== Player ===
Botafogo

- Campeonato Carioca: 1989, 1990

=== Manager ===
America

- Campeonato Carioca Série B: 2015
