= 1995 Copa de Oro =

1995 Copa de Oro Nicolás Leoz 1995 Copa de Ouro Nicolás Leoz

Tournament details
- Dates: October 25 - November 1
- Teams: 2 (from 1 confederation)

Final positions
- Champions: (Brazil) Cruzeiro (1st title)
- Runners-up: (Brazil) São Paulo

Tournament statistics
- Matches played: 2
- Goals scored: 2 (1 per match)
- Top scorer(s): (Brazil) Palhinha (Brazil) Dinei (1 goal)

The 1995 Copa de Oro was the second Copa de Oro, a football competition for the reigning champions of CONMEBOL's Copa Libertadores, the Supercopa Libertadores, the Copa CONMEBOL, and the Copa Master de Supercopa. It was played from October 25 to November 1.

The competition was contested between Cruzeiro, winners of the 1995 Copa Master de Supercopa, and São Paulo, winners of the 1994 Copa CONMEBOL, in a two-legged tie. Vélez Sársfield, winner of the 1994 Copa Libertadores, and Independiente, winner of the 1994 Supercopa Libertadores, declined to participate. In addition, the scheduling conflicts of the competition led the only match-up between Cruzeiro and São Paulo to count as a quarterfinal tie for the 1995 Supercopa Libertadores.

The first leg of the match-up was suspended at the forty-seventh minute after Cruzeiro was left with six players on the field. Four of their players had been sent off in the first half and one player—who was injured— could not be substituted because Cruzeiro had used up all of its substitutions; in accordance with the Laws of the Game, a minimum of seven players on either team are needed on the field in order to restart play. The match ended with a 1–0 victory for São Paulo. In the return leg, Cruzeiro evened the aggregate score with a 1–0 win. The final went to a penalty shootout. Cruzeiro claimed the trophy after winning the shootout 4-2 and additionally qualified to the semifinal stage of the 1995 Supercopa Libertadores.

== Eligible teams ==
Team	Honor	Response
(Argentina) Vélez Sársfield	Winners of the 1994 Copa Libertadores	Declined
(Argentina) Independiente	Winners of the 1994 Supercopa Libertadores	Declined
(Brazil) São Paulo	Winners of the 1994 Copa CONMEBOL	Accepted
(Brazil) Cruzeiro	Winners of the 1995 Copa Master de Supercopa	Accepted

== Match details ==
=== First leg ===
October 25, 1995

Cruzeiro (Brazil)	0 – 1	(Brazil) São Paulo
		Palhinha

Mineirão, Belo Horizonte

=== Second leg ===
November 1, 1995

São Paulo (Brazil)	0 – 1	(Brazil) Cruzeiro
		Dinei
Penalties
Bordon (penalty scored); André (penalty scored); Alemão (penalty missed)	2 – 4	(penalty scored) Bobô; (penalty scored) Paulinho; (penalty scored) Alberto; (penalty scored) Gélson

Estádio do Morumbi, São Paulo

== Top goalscorers ==
1 goal

- (Brazil) Palhinha
- (Brazil) Dinei
