= Bizu (footballer) =

Brazilian footballer (born 1960)

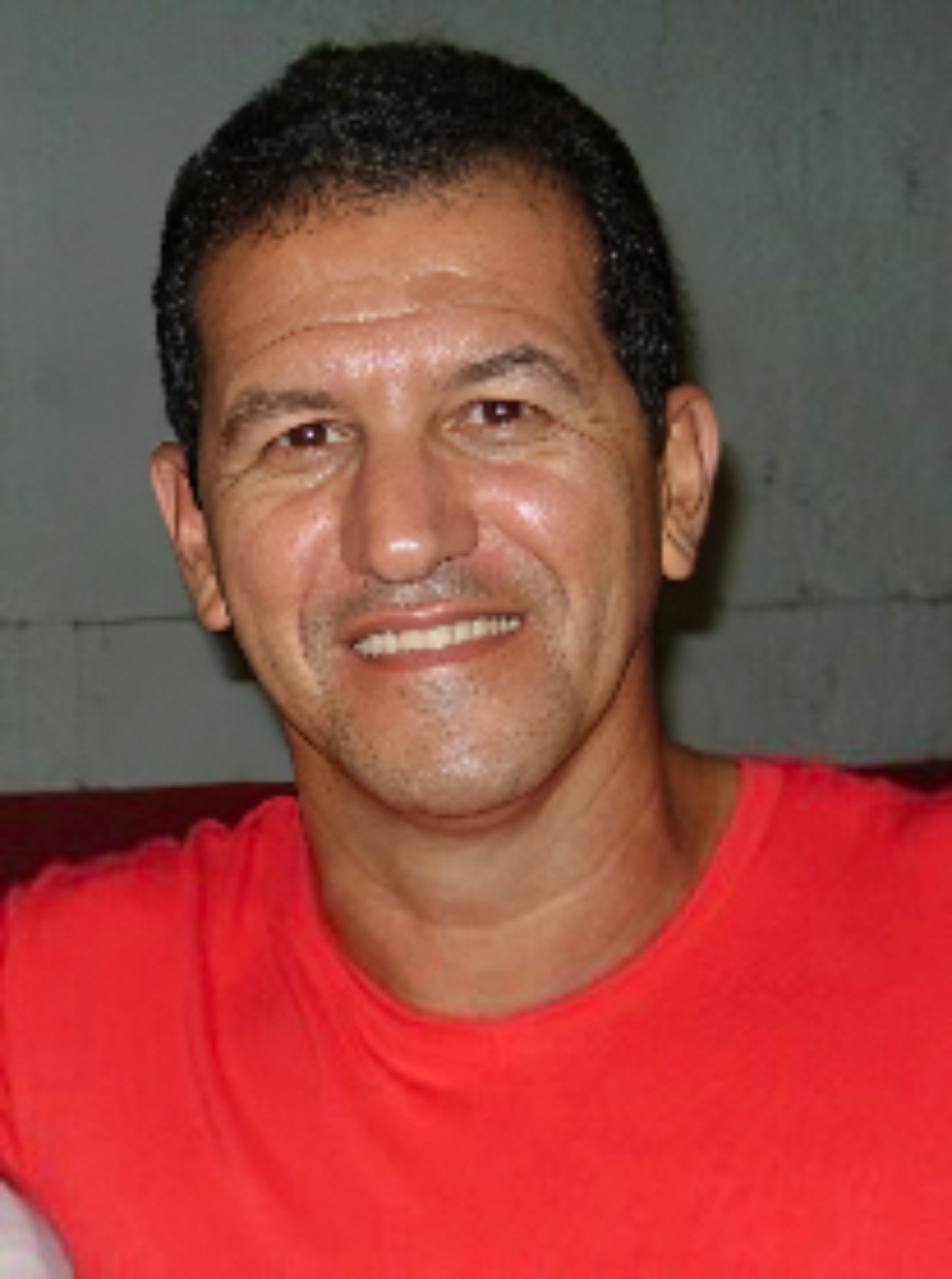
- Cláudio Tavares Gonçalves

Personal information
- Full name: Cláudio Tavares Gonçalves
- Date of birth: 18 June 1960 (age 66)
- Place of birth: São Vicente, Brazil
- Height: 1.80 m (5 ft 11 in)
- Position: Forward

Senior career*
| Years | Team | Apps | (Gls) |
| 1979–1981 | Caçadorense | | |
| 1981–1982 | Blumenau | | |
| 1982 | Bangu | | |
| 1983–1984 | Avaí | | |
| 1984 | Cascavel EC | | |
| 1985–1986 | Novo Hamburgo | | |
| 1987 | Caxias | | |
| 1987–1988 | Palmeiras | | |
| 1988–1991 | Náutico | | |
| 1991 | Grêmio | | |
| 1992 | CSA | | |
| 1992 | Náutico | | |
| 1993 | Sport Recife | | |
| 1994 | Ceará | | |
| 1994 | Náutico | | |
| 1994 | Confiança | | |

Managerial career
- 2012: Aimoré
- * Club domestic league appearances and goals as of 11 January 2024

Cláudio Tavares Gonçalves (born 18 June 1960), better known as Bizu, is a Brazilian former professional footballer who played as a forward.

== Career ==
Born in São Vicente, Bizu began his football career in Santa Catarina, playing for Caçadorense, Blumenau and Avaí. He played for other clubs in the southern region until being hired by Palmeiras, where he played 31 matches and scored 4 goals. He went to Náutico and became one of the most important players in the club's history, elected Silver Ball in 1989, state champion and top scorer in the Copa do Brasil in 1990. Bizu had 189 appearances and 114 goals for Náutico Capibaribe.

== Honours ==
Avaí

- Taça Governado do Estado: 1983

Náutico

- Campeonato Pernambucano: 1989
- Torneio Jaime Cisneiros: 1990

Individual

- 1989 Bola de Prata
- 1990 Copa do Brasil top scorer: 7 goals
- Campeonato Pernambucano top scorer: 1989, 1990
