= Charles Guerreiro =

Brazilian footballer (born 1963)

Personal information
- Full name: Charles Natali de Mendonça Ayres
- Date of birth: 21 December 1963 (age 62)
- Place of birth: Belém, Brazil
- Height: 1.88 m (6 ft 2 in)
- Position: Right back

Senior career*
Years	Team	Apps	(Gls)
1984–1987	Paysandu		
1987	Ponte Preta		
1988–1991	Guarani		
1991–1995	Flamengo		
1995	Vasco da Gama		
1996	Fluminense		
1997	Inter de Limeira		
1997	Bragantino		
1998	Cabofriense		
1998	Paysandu		
1999	Olaria		
2000	Paysandu		
2001–2002	Remo		

International career
1992–1995	Brazil	4	(0)

Managerial career
- 2006: Ananindeua
- 2007: Remo
- 2007: Remo
- 2008: Cardoso Moreira
- 2010: Paysandu
- 2011: São Raimundo-PA
- 2011: Independente-PA
- 2012: Tuna Luso
- 2012: São Raimundo-PA
- 2013: Paragominas
- 2013–2014: Remo
- 2015: Paragominas
- 2017: Paragominas (interim)
- 2017: Ypiranga-AP
- 2018: Paragominas
- 2019: Independente-PA
- 2019: Tuna Luso
- 2020: Iranduba
- 2020: Independente-PA
- 2020–2021: Imperatriz
- 2022: Itupiranga
- 2023: Paranoá (assistant)
- 2023: ITZ Sport
- * Club domestic league appearances and goals

Charles Natali Mendonça Ayres (born 22 December 1963), known as Charles Guerreiro, is a Brazilian football coach and former player who played as a right back.

== Honours ==
=== Player ===
Paysandu

- Campeonato Paraense: 1985, 1987, 2000

Flamengo

- Campeonato Carioca: 1991
- Copa Rio: 1991
- Campeonato Brasileiro Série A: 1992

=== Manager ===
Paysandu

- Campeonato Paraense: 2010

Paragominas

- Taça Estado do Pará: 2013
