= Luis Alberto Bonnet =

Argentine-Peruvian footballer (born 1971)

Personal information
- Full name: Luis Alberto Bonnet García
- Date of birth: April 27, 1971 (age 55)
- Place of birth: Buenos Aires, Argentina
- Height: 1.85 m (6 ft 1 in)
- Position: Striker

Senior career*
Years	Team	Apps	(Gls)
1991–1996	Atlanta	131	(31)
1996–1997	Sporting Cristal	33	(5)
1997–2000	Gimnasia y Tiro de Salta	15	(4)
2000	Cienciano	21	(19)
2001–2008	Sporting Cristal	211	(120)
- * Club domestic league appearances and goals

Luis Alberto Bonnet (born 27 April 1971) is an Argentine-Peruvian retired football striker.
