= Aílton Ferraz =

Brazilian footballer (born 1966)

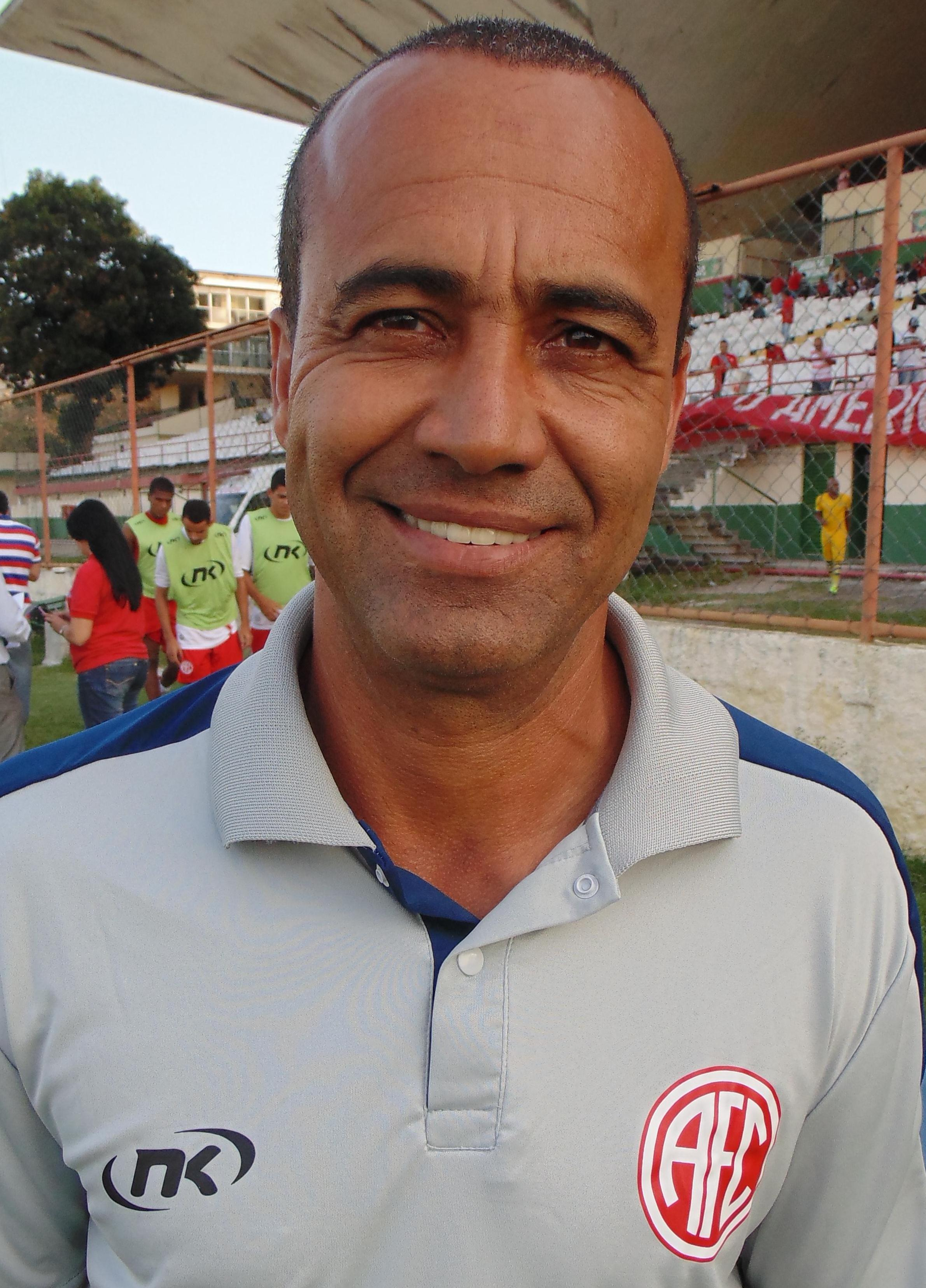

Personal information
- Full name: Aílton dos Santos Ferraz
- Date of birth: January 19, 1966 (age 60)
- Place of birth: Rio de Janeiro, Brazil
- Height: 1.70 m (5 ft 7 in)
- Position: Attacking midfielder

Team information
- Current team: Fluminense (assistant)

Senior career*
Years	Team	Apps	(Gls)
1985–1991	Flamengo		
1991–1992	Guarani		
1993–1994	Kashiwa Reysol		
1995–1996	Fluminense		
1996	Grêmio		
1997	Botafogo		
1998	Grêmio		
1998	Ponte Preta		
1999	Cabofriense		
2000	Madureira		
2000	Remo		
2001	União São João		
2001	Cabofriense		
2001	Paraná		
2002	Uberlândia		

Managerial career
- 2007: America
- 2008: Cabofriense
- 2009: Volta Redonda
- 2010: Resende
- 2010: Duque de Caxias
- 2010: Goiás (assistant)
- 2011: Figueirense (assistant)
- 2012: Kashima Antlers (assistant)
- 2013: Flamengo (assistant)
- 2014: Resende
- 2014: America
- 2015: Audax Rio
- 2015–2016: Resende
- 2017: Tupi
- 2018: Brasiliense
- 2018–2019: Tupi
- 2019: Portuguesa da Ilha
- 2019–: Fluminense (assistant)
- * Club domestic league appearances and goals

Aílton dos Santos Ferraz, sometimes known as just Aílton (born January 19, 1966), is a retired association footballer who played as an attacking midfielder for several Série A clubs.

== Career ==
Born in Rio de Janeiro, Aílton Ferraz started his professional career playing with Flamengo. With Flamengo he played 116 Série A games and scored five goals between 1985 and 1991. He won the Campeonato Carioca in 1985, 1986 and 1987, the Taça Guanabara in 1988 and in 1989, the Taça Rio in 1985 and in 1986 the Série A in 1987, and the Copa do Brasil in 1990 with the club.

He left Flamengo in 1991 to play with Guarani, joining Kashiwa Reysol of Japan in 1993 and returning to Brazil in 1995 to defend Fluminense. He helped the club win the Campeonato Carioca in 1995. He was part of the Grêmio squad that won the 1996 Série A. After playing for several different clubs, he retired in 2002 while defending Uberlândia.

He began his coaching career in 2007 as America's head coach. After commanding weaker teams, such as Cabofriense, Volta Redonda and Duque de Caxias, he was invited by Jorginho to be his assistant coach. Ferraz then worked with Jorginho at Goiás, Figueirense, and Flamengo, before becoming a head coach again at smaller clubs. Since 2019, he has been an assistant coach at Fluminense.

== Honors ==
=== Player ===
Flamengo

- Campeonato Brasileiro Série A: 1987
- Copa do Brasil: 1990
- Campeonato Carioca: 1986, 1991
- Copa Rio: 1991

Fluminense

- Campeonato Carioca: 1995

Grêmio

- Campeonato Brasileiro Série A: 1996
- Recopa Sudamericana: 1996
- Campeonato Gaúcho: 1996

Botafogo

- Campeonato Carioca: 1997

Remo

- Campeonato Paraense: 1999

=== Manager ===
Resende

- Copa Rio: 2015
