= Uidemar =

Brazilian footballer and manager

Personal information
- Full name: Uidemar Pessoa de Oliveira
- Date of birth: 8 January 1965 (age 61)
- Place of birth: Damolândia, Brazil
- Height: 1.70 m (5 ft 7 in)
- Position: Midfielder

Youth career
- União Inhumas
- Aparecidense
- Goiás

Senior career*
Years	Team	Apps	(Gls)
1986–1989	Goiás		
1990–1993	Flamengo		
1993–1995	León		
1995	Goiás		
1996	Botafogo		
1996	Fluminense		
1996	Araçatuba		
1998	Ponte Preta		
1999	São José-SP		
1999	Paysandu		

International career
1987–1989	Brazil	2	(0)

Managerial career
- 2011: Morrinhos
- 2011: Penarol
- 2012: Nacional-AM
- 2012: Vitória das Tabocas
- 2014: Interporto
- 2017: ASEEV
- 2020: Itumbiara
- 2022: Itumbiara (assistant)
- 2023: Interporto
- 2024: Cametá
- * Club domestic league appearances and goals

Uidemar Pessoa de Oliveira (born 8 January 1965), simply known as Uidemar, is a Brazilian football coach and former player who played as a midfielder.

Uidemar played for Campeonato Brasileiro Série A clubs Goiás, Flamengo and Fluminense, and for the Brazil national team.

== Career ==
Born in Damolândia, Goiás state, before becoming a professional footballer, Uidemar played for the youth clubs of União Inhumas, Aparecidense and Goiás. He started his professional career playing for Goiás, where he played 71 Campeonato Brasileiro Série A matches and scored 2 goals from 1986 to 1989. During that period he also won the Campeonato Goiano in 1986, 1987 and in 1989. In 1990, he moved to Flamengo, of Rio de Janeiro, where he played 145 matches and scored six goals from 1990 to 1993, winning during that time the Copa do Brasil in 1990, the Campeonato Carioca in 1991, and the Campeonato Brasileiro Série A in 1992. On December 2, 1989, he scored a goal during Zico's farewell match, when Flamengo beat Fluminense 5-0 for the Campeonato Brasileiro Série A. He played for the Mexican side Club León, from 1993 to 1995. In 1995, he returned to Goiás, where he played 14 more Campeonato Brasileiro Série A matches, moving to Botafogo in the following year, where he briefly played, winning Taça Cidade Maravilhosa, then moving in the same year to Fluminense, where he played 19 Campeonato Brasileiro Série A matches. After leaving Fluminense, he played for Araçatuba and Ponte Preta from São Paulo state, then moving to Paysandu in 1999, when he retired.

== National team ==
Uidemar played two matches for the Brazil national team, the first one on December 12, 1987, against West Germany, at Estádio Mané Garrincha, Brasília, in which Brazil and West Germany drew 1-1, and the other one on March 15, 1989, at Verdão, Cuiabá, when Brazil beat Ecuador 2-0.

== Retirement ==
After his retirement, Uidemar moved to Goiânia city, where he opened a sports and recreation center.

== Honors ==
Uidemar won the following honors during his career:

Club	Competition	Seasons
Botafogo	Taça Cidade Maravilhosa	1996
Flamengo	Campeonato Brasileiro Série A	1992
Flamengo	Campeonato Carioca	1991
Flamengo	Copa do Brasil	1990
Goiás	Campeonato Goiano	1986, 1987, 1989

=== Head coaching honors ===
Club	Competition	Seasons
Penarol	Campeonato Amazonense	2011
