= 1992 Campeonato Brasileiro Série A =

Football season

Campeonato Brasileiro Série A
- Season: 1992
- Champions: Flamengo (4th title)
- Relegated: Náutico; Paysandu
- Copa Libertadores: São Paulo (title holders); Flamengo; Internacional (via Copa do Brasil)
- Matches: 216
- Goals: 495 (2.29 per match)
- Top goalscorer: Bebeto (18)
- Biggest home win: Botafogo 6−0 Goiás (19 April 1992)
- Biggest away win: Atlético Mineiro 0−4 Vasco (23 February 1992); São Paulo 0-4 Palmeiras (8 March 1992); Náutico 0−4 Atlético Mineiro (5 April 1992)
- Highest scoring: Goiás 5−2 Sport (5 April 1992)
- Highest attendance: Botafogo v Flamengo (122,001)
- Average attendance: 16,814

The 1992 Campeonato Brasileiro Série A was the 36th edition of the Campeonato Brasileiro Série A. The competition was won by Flamengo.

== Format ==
First Stage: 20 clubs playing against each other once. The eight best placed teams qualified to the second stage.

Second Stage: 8 clubs divided in 2 groups of 4 teams each; playing against the other teams of their respective groups twice. The winner of each group qualify to the final.

Final: The finalists play against each other twice, the club with the best performance in the competition has the advantage of winning the competition if it draw both matches.

== Competition standings ==
=== First stage ===
Pos	Team	Pld	W	D	L	GF	GA	GD	Pts	Qualification
1	Vasco	19	10	6	3	31	14	+17	26	Qualified to Group 1
2	Botafogo	19	11	2	6	37	23	+14	24	Qualified to Group 2
3	Bragantino	19	9	6	4	16	13	+3	24	Qualified to Group 2
4	Flamengo	19	8	6	5	32	24	+8	22	Qualified to Group 1
5	Corinthians	19	8	6	5	24	22	+2	22	Qualified to Group 2
6	São Paulo	19	8	5	6	22	16	+6	21	Qualified to Group 1
7	Cruzeiro	19	7	7	5	10	14	−4	21	Qualified to Group 2
8	Santos	19	7	7	5	23	18	+5	21	Qualified to Group 1
9	Guarani	19	8	4	7	15	19	−4	20	
10	Internacional	19	7	6	6	19	20	−1	20	
11	Palmeiras	19	8	3	8	23	17	+6	19	
12	Sport	19	4	11	4	15	15	0	19	
13	Atlético Mineiro	19	6	6	7	15	18	−3	18	
14	Fluminense	19	5	8	6	21	19	+2	18	
15	Atlético-PR	19	5	6	8	19	32	−13	16	
16	Portuguesa	19	4	7	8	21	26	−5	15	
17	Goiás	19	4	7	8	23	34	−11	15	
18	Bahia	19	4	6	9	20	24	−4	14	
19	Náutico	19	3	7	9	17	29	−12	13	
20	Paysandu	19	5	2	12	19	35	−16	12	

=== Second stage ===
Group 1
Pos	Team	Pld	W	D	L	GF	GA	GD	Pts	Qualification
1	Flamengo	6	3	1	2	7	5	+2	7	Finalist
2	Vasco	6	1	4	1	10	9	+1	6	
3	São Paulo	6	2	2	2	6	7	−1	6	
4	Santos	6	1	3	2	7	9	−2	5	

Group 2
Pos	Team	Pld	W	D	L	GF	GA	GD	Pts	Qualification
1	Botafogo	6	4	1	1	7	4	+3	9	Finalist
2	Bragantino	6	3	2	1	6	4	+2	8	
3	Corinthians	6	2	1	3	8	7	+1	5	
4	Cruzeiro	6	1	0	5	5	11	−6	2	

=== Finals ===
July 12, 1992

Flamengo	3 – 0	Botafogo
Júnior 15'; Nélio 34'; Gaúcho 38'

Maracanã, Rio de Janeiro
Attendance: 102,547
Referee: José Roberto Wright

July 19, 1992

Botafogo	2 – 2 (2 – 5 agg.)	Flamengo
Pichetti 83'; Valdeir 88' (pen.)		Júnior 42'; Júlio César 55'

Maracanã, Rio de Janeiro
Attendance: 122,001
Referee: José Roberto Wright

Botafogo
Flamengo

GK	1	(Brazil) Ricardo Cruz
RB	2	(Brazil) Odemilson	Booked
CB	3	(Brazil) René Rivas	Sent off (straight red)
CB	4	(Brazil) Márcio Santos
LB	6	(Brazil) Válber	Booked
DM	11	(Brazil) Pingo	Booked
MF	5	(Brazil) Carlos Alberto Santos (c)
AM	8	(Brazil) Carlos Alberto Dias
FW	10	(Brazil) Valdeir	Booked
FW	7	(Brazil) Vivinho		(substituted off) 74'
CF	9	(Brazil) Chicão		(substituted off) 74'
Substitutes:
LB	15	(Brazil) Jefferson		(substituted on) 74'
CF	16	(Brazil) Pichetti		(substituted on) 74'
Manager:
(Brazil) Gil

GK	1	(Brazil) Gilmar
RB	2	(Brazil) Charles
CB	3	(Brazil) Gélson
CB	4	(Brazil) Wilson Gottardo	(red card) 89'
LB	6	(Brazil) Piá
DM	10	(Brazil) Fabinho		(substituted off) 75'
DM	8	(Brazil) Uidemar
MF	5	(Brazil) Júnior (c)
AM	11	(Brazil) Zinho
FW	7	(Brazil) Júlio César
CF	9	(Brazil) Gaúcho	Booked	(substituted off) 86'
Substitutes:
CB	13	(Brazil) Mauro		(substituted on) 75'
AM	15	(Brazil) Djalminha		(substituted on) 86'
Manager:
(Brazil) Carlinhos

- Before the match, an upper stand in the stadium collapsed, leading to the death of three spectators and injuring 82 others.

== Final standings ==
Pos	Team	Pld	W	D	L	GF	GA	GD	Pts	Result
1	Flamengo	27	12	8	7	44	31	+13	32	Played the final
2	Botafogo	27	15	4	8	46	32	+14	34	Played the final
3	Vasco	25	11	10	4	41	23	+18	32	Eliminated in the 2nd Stage
4	Bragantino	25	12	8	5	22	17	+5	32	Eliminated in the 2nd Stage
5	Corinthians	25	10	7	8	32	29	+3	27	Eliminated in the 2nd Stage
6	São Paulo	25	10	7	8	28	23	+5	27	Eliminated in the 2nd Stage
7	Santos	25	8	10	7	30	27	+3	26	Eliminated in the 2nd Stage
8	Cruzeiro	25	8	7	10	25	25	0	23	Eliminated in the 2nd Stage
9	Guarani	19	8	4	7	15	19	−4	20	Eliminated in the 1st Stage
10	Internacional	19	7	6	6	19	20	−1	20	Eliminated in the 1st Stage
11	Palmeiras	19	8	3	8	23	17	+6	19	Eliminated in the 1st Stage
12	Sport	19	4	11	4	15	15	0	19	Eliminated in the 1st Stage
13	Atlético Mineiro	19	6	6	7	15	18	−3	18	Eliminated in the 1st Stage
14	Fluminense	19	5	8	6	21	19	+2	18	Eliminated in the 1st Stage
15	Atlético-PR	19	5	6	8	19	32	−13	16	Eliminated in the 1st Stage
16	Portuguesa	19	4	7	8	21	26	−5	15	Eliminated in the 1st Stage
17	Goiás	19	4	7	8	23	34	−11	15	Eliminated in the 1st Stage
18	Bahia	19	4	6	9	20	24	−4	14	Eliminated in the 1st Stage
19	Náutico (Note: According to the competition rules, Náutico and Paysandu were supposed to be relegated to Série B 1993.)	19	3	7	9	17	29	−12	13	Eliminated in the 1st Stage
20	Paysandu	19	5	2	12	19	35	−16	12	Eliminated in the 1st Stage

Source: rsssf.com

== Top scorers ==
Pos.	Scorer	Club	Goals
1	(Brazil) Bebeto	Vasco da Gama	18
2	(Brazil) Chicão	Botafogo	12
2	(Brazil) Paulinho McLaren	Santos	12
4	(Brazil) Nílson	Portuguesa	10
4	(Brazil) Túlio Maravilha	Goiás	10
