= Mario Véner =

Argentine-Chilean footballer and coach

Personal information
- Date of birth: 27 May 1964 (age 62)
- Place of birth: Tandil, Argentina
- Height: 1.73 m (5 ft 8 in)
- Position: Forward

Youth career
- Ferrocarril Sud
- Gimnasia de Tandil

Senior career*
Years	Team	Apps	(Gls)
1987	Gimnasia de Tandil		
1987	Ferrocarril Sud		
1988	Loma Negra Barker		
1989	Fortín de Olavarría		
1989	Atlético Noci		
1990	Def. Cambaceres		
1990	Deportes Linares		
1991	Deportes Puerto Montt		
1992–1993	Deportes Antofagasta		
1993–1994	Cádiz		
1994	Deportes Temuco		
1995	Regional Atacama		
1996–1997	Santiago Wanderers		
1998	Deportes Iquique		
1999	Huachipato		
2000	Deportes Concepción		

Managerial career
- 2008: Deportes Antofagasta
- * Club domestic league appearances and goals as of 17 March 2024

Mario Fabián Véner Igaña (born 27 May 1964) is an Argentine naturalized Chilean former professional footballer who played as a forward for clubs in Chile, Italy and Spain,

After his retirement from football he moved into coaching, and is coach of the inferiors of Deportes Antofagasta of the Primera B in Chile.

== Honours ==
Santiago Wanderers

- Primera División de Chile Top-Scorer: 1996
