= 1990 Copa do Brasil =

Copa do Brasil 1990

Tournament details
- Country: Brazil
- Dates: June 19 - November 7
- Teams: 32

Final positions
- Champions: Flamengo
- Runners-up: Goiás

Tournament statistics
- Matches played: 62
- Goals scored: 119 (1.92 per match)
- Top goal scorer: (Brazil) Bizu (7)

The 1990 Copa do Brasil was the second edition of the Copa do Brasil.

The competition started on June 19, 1990, and ended on November 7, 1990, with the second leg of the final, held at the Estádio Serra Dourada in Goiânia, in which Flamengo lifted the trophy for the first time with a 0–0 draw with Goiás.

Bizu, of Náutico, with seven goals, was the competition's top scorer.

== Format ==
The competition featured 32 clubs in a knock-out format, where all rounds were played in two legs and the away goals rule applied.

== Participating teams ==
- América (RN)
- Atlético (MG)
- Bahia (BA)
- Botafogo (RJ)
- Capelense (AL)
- Ceará (CE)
- Coritiba (PR)
- Criciúma (SC)

- Cruzeiro (MG)
- Desportiva (ES)
- Flamengo (RJ)
- Goiás (GO)
- Grêmio (RS)
- Internacional (RS)
- Joinville (SC)
- Juventus (AC)

- Mixto (MT)
- Moto Club (MA)
- Náutico (PE)
- Operário (MS)
- Remo (PA)
- Rio Negro (AM)
- River (PI)
- Santa Cruz (PE)

- São José (SP)
- São Paulo (SP)
- Sergipe (SE)
- Taguatinga (DF)
- Treze (PB)
- União Bandeirante (PR)
- Vila Nova (GO)
- Vitória (BA)

== Competition stages ==
1st Round
1	Treze (PB)	0 1
32	Náutico (PE)	0 2
17	River (PI)	2 2
16	Ceará (CE)	1 0
9	Moto Club (MA)	1 1
24	Remo (PA)	1 1
25	Santa Cruz (PE)	3 1
8	América (RN)	1 0
5	Bahia (BA)	0 1
28	Sergipe (SE)	0 1
21	Desportiva (ES)	1 1
12	Botafogo (RJ)	1 2
13	Flamengo (RJ)	5 4
20	Capelense (AL)	1 0
29	Taguatinga (DF)	1 0
4	Vitória (BA)	0 1
3	Criciúma (SC)	0 2
30	Internacional (RS)	1 0
19	Coritiba (PR)	1 0
14	São José (SP)	2 0
11	União Bandeirante (PR)	0 0
22	São Paulo (SP)	1 2
27	Grêmio (RS)	1 3
6	Joinville (SC)	1 1
7	Atlético (MG)	0 5
26	Vila Nova (GO)	0 0
23	Rio Negro (AM)	0 1
10	Juventus (AC)	1 0
15	Operário (MS)	2 0
18	Mixto (MT)	0 1
31	Cruzeiro (MG)	0 0
2	Goiás (GO)'	0 4

2nd Round
Náutico (PE)	0 3
Ceará (CE)	0 0
Remo (PA)	0 1
Santa Cruz (PE)	0 0
Bahia (BA)	1 1
Botafogo (RJ)	0 1
Flamengo (RJ)	2 1
Taguatinga (DF)	0 1
Coritiba (PR)	0 0
Criciúma (SC)	1 0
Grêmio (RS)	1 0
São Paulo (SP)	1 0
Atlético (MG)	0 2
Rio Negro (AM)	1 0
Operário (MS)	0 0
Goiás (GO)	1 5

Quarterfinals
Remo (PA)	3 0
Náutico (PE)	1 4
Bahia (BA)	1 0
Flamengo (RJ)	1 1
Criciúma (SC)	2 0
São Paulo (SP)	0 1
Atlético (MG)	0 4
Goiás (GO)	0 3

Semifinals
Flamengo (RJ)	3 2
Náutico (PE)	0 2
Criciúma (SC)	1 0
Goiás (GO)	0 1

Finals
Flamengo (RJ)	1 0
Goiás (GO)	0 0

== Finals ==
November 1, 1990
19:30

Flamengo	1 – 0	Goiás
Fernando 61'

Estádio Mário Helênio, Juiz de Fora
Attendance: 2,437
Referee: Renato Marsiglia

November 7, 1990
21:00

Goiás	0 – 0 (0 – 1 agg.)	Flamengo

Estádio Serra Dourada, Goiânia
Attendance: 45,504
Referee: Renato Marsiglia

Goiás	Flamengo

GK	1	(Brazil) Eduardo Heuser
RB	2	(Brazil) Wilson Goiano		(substituted off) 73'
CB	3	(Brazil) Richard
CB	4	(Brazil) Jorge Batata	Booked
LB	6	(Brazil) Dalton
DM	5	(Brazil) Wallace
MF	8	(Brazil) Fagundes (c)
AM	11	(Brazil) Josué		(substituted off) 45'
AM	10	(Brazil) Luvanor
CF	9	(Brazil) Túlio
FW	7	(Brazil) Niltinho
Substitutes:
RB	14	(Brazil) Rubens Carlos		(substituted on) 73'
FW	16	(Brazil) Agnaldo		(substituted on) 45'
Manager:
(Brazil) Sebastião Lapola

GK	1	(Brazil) Zé Carlos
RB	2	(Brazil) Ailton	Booked
CB	3	(Brazil) Vitor Hugo
CB	6	(Brazil) Rogério
LB	4	(Brazil) Piá
DM	8	(Brazil) Uidemar
MF	5	(Brazil) Júnior
MF	10	(Brazil) Bobô		(substituted off) 80'
FW	7	(Brazil) Renato Gaúcho (c)	Booked
CF	9	(Brazil) Gaúcho	Booked	(substituted off) 73'
FW	11	(Brazil) Zinho	Booked
Substitutes:
MF	14	(Brazil) Marquinhos		(substituted on) 73'
AM	16	(Brazil) Nélio		(substituted on) 80'
Manager:
(Brazil) Jair Pereira

Copa do Brasil
1990 Winners
Flamengo
First Title
