= Fabinho (footballer, born 1970) =

Brazilian footballer

Personal information
- Full name: Fábio da Silva Azevedo
- Date of birth: 12 January 1970 (age 56)
- Place of birth: Rio de Janeiro, Brazil
- Height: 1.74 m (5 ft 9 in)
- Position: Midfielder

Youth career
- 1986–1990: Flamengo

Senior career*
Years	Team	Apps	(Gls)
1990–1995	Flamengo	254	(9)
1995–1997	Cruzeiro	144	(3)
1998–2000	Grêmio	106	(1)
2000–2002	Fluminense	120	(0)

International career
1988	Brazil U20		
- * Club domestic league appearances and goals as of 21 January 2024

Fábio da Silva Azevedo (born 12 January 1970), simply known as Fabinho, is a Brazilian former professional footballer who played as a midfielder.

== Career ==
A midfielder, Fabinho began his career in football by standing out at Flamengo's youth team. He was South American U20 champion in 1988, and the Copa São Paulo de Futebol Jr. in 1990. He won the most diverse titles for the club, making 254 total appearances. He transferred to Cruzeiro in 1995 and once again stood out, winning the Copa do Brasil and Copa Libertadores in 1997. He also played for Grêmio and Fluminense, achieving the feat of making more than 100 appearances for four major Brazilian football clubs.

== Honours ==
Flamengo

- Campeonato Brasileiro: 1992
- Campeonato Carioca: 1991
- Copa Rio: 1991
- Taça Rio: 1991
- Taça Guanabara: 1995
- Copa São Paulo de Futebol Jr.: 1990

Cruzeiro

- Copa Libertadores: 1997
- Copa do Brasil: 1996
- Campeonato Mineiro: 1996, 1997

Grêmio

- Copa Sul: 1999
- Campeonato Gaúcho: 1999

Fluminense

- Campeonato Carioca: 2002

Brazil U20

- South American U-20 Championship: 1988
