= Piá Carioca =

Brazilian footballer

Personal information
- Full name: Marcus Vinícius Pedro Nogueira
- Date of birth: 16 October 1969 (age 57)
- Place of birth: Campos dos Goytacazes, Brazil
- Position: Left back

Youth career
- Flamengo

Senior career*
Years	Team	Apps	(Gls)
1989–1993	Flamengo	221	(6)
1994–1997	União da Madeira	22	(1)
1994–1995	→ Santos (loan)		
1998	Araçatuba		
1999	Matonense		
1999	ABC		
1999–2000	Cabofriense		
2000	União Barbarense		
2001	Matonense		
2001	Gama		
2002	America-RJ		
2003	Corinthians-AL		
2004	Grêmio Jaciara		
2004	Cuiabá		
2005–2006	Serrano-RJ		
- * Club domestic league appearances and goals as of 18 March 2024

Marcus Vinícius Pedro Nogueira (born 16 October 1960), better known as Piá Carioca, is a Brazilian former professional footballer who played as a left back.

== Career ==
A left back formed at Flamengo, he made 221 appearances for the club, and contributed to the victories of the 1992 Brazilian championship, 1990 Copa do Brasil and the state championship in 1991. He later played for C.F. União and Santos. It became known as Piá Carioca so as not to be confused with the other Piá, from São Paulo's football.

== Honours ==
Flamengo

- Campeonato Brasileiro: 1992
- Copa do Brasil: 1990
- Campeonato Carioca: 1991
- Taça Guanabara: 1989
- Taça Rio: 1991
- Copa Rio: 1991
- Taça Brahma dos Campeões: 1992
- Marlboro Cup: 1990

União da Madeira

- Taça da Madeira: 1994–95

Gama

- Campeonato Brasiliense: 2001

Cuiabá

- Campeonato Mato-Grossense: 2004
