= Prince Amoako =

Ghanaian footballer

Personal information
- Full name: Prince Koranteng Amoako
- Date of birth: 19 November 1973 (age 52)
- Place of birth: Kumasi, Ghana
- Height: 1.73 m (5 ft 8 in)
- Position: Attacking midfielder

Senior career*
Years	Team	Apps	(Gls)
1991–1994	Dawu Youngstars		
1994–1997	Asante Kotoko	82	(37)
1997	Sporting Cristal	15	(3)
1998–1999	Deportivo Municipal	58	(22)
1999–2000	Granada	15	(5)
2000–2001	Nafpaktiakos Asteras	15	(13)
2001–2004	Saturn Ramenskoye	60	(5)
2005	Asante Kotoko		
2006–2007	Asante Kotoko		

International career
1995–2002	Ghana	25	(3)
- * Club domestic league appearances and goals

Prince Koranteng Amoako (born 19 November 1973) is a Ghanaian former professional footballer who played as an attacking midfielder.

== Club career ==
Amoako was born in Kumasi.

== International career ==
Amoako was a member of the team that reached the final of the most important South American Club Competition, Copa Libertadores playing with Sporting Cristal from Peru in 1997. They tied in Lima 0-0 and lost in Brazil to Cruzeiro 1–0. This was the first time a Peruvian team reached the final since the 1970s when Universitario de Deportes also tied and lost the final to club Independiente from Argentina.

Amoako was part of the Ghana national team at the 2002 African Nations Cup, which exited in the quarter-finals after losing to Nigeria, having finished second in Group B.
