= 1990 Campeonato Brasileiro Série A =

Football season

Campeonato Brasileiro Série A
- Season: 1990
- Champions: Corinthians (1st title)
- Relegated: São José; Internacional-SP
- Copa Libertadores: Corinthians; Flamengo (via Copa do Brasil)
- Matches: 204
- Goals: 386 (1.89 per match)

The 1990 Campeonato Brasileiro Série A was the 34th edition of the Campeonato Brasileiro Série A.

== Overview ==
It was contested by 20 teams, and Corinthians won the championship. Relegated: Sao Jose and Inter de Limeira.

== Format ==
The tournament will be played in a double round-robin system. For the determination of the quarterfinalists the 20 Teams is divided into 2 groups. The best team of each group considering only results within the group and the best team of each group considering only results with teams from the other group alongside the 4 best placed teams in the overall table advance to the quarterfinals. The bottom two teams will be relegated.

== First stage ==
Pos	Team	Pld	W	D	L	GF	GA	GD	Pts	Qualification or relegation
1	Grêmio	19	9	7	3	25	13	+12	25	Advances to the Quarterfinals
2	Atlético Mineiro	19	7	9	3	19	16	+3	23	Advances to the Quarterfinals
3	São Paulo	19	8	6	5	20	14	+6	22	Advances to the Quarterfinals
4	Corinthians	19	8	6	5	17	18	−1	22	Advances to the Quarterfinals
5	Bahia	19	7	8	4	20	12	+8	22	Advances to the Quarterfinals
6	Bragantino	19	7	8	4	19	16	+3	22	Advances to the Quarterfinals
7	Santos	19	7	8	4	19	13	+6	22	Advances to the Quarterfinals
8	Palmeiras	19	8	5	6	21	18	+3	21	Advances to the Quarterfinals
9	Cruzeiro	19	8	5	6	21	18	+3	21	
10	Goiás	19	7	7	5	22	19	+3	21	
11	Flamengo	19	7	6	6	24	18	+6	20	
12	Botafogo	19	7	4	8	17	18	−1	18	
13	Náutico	19	4	10	5	13	18	−5	18	
14	Vasco da Gama	19	3	12	4	15	15	0	18	
15	Fluminense	19	5	5	9	19	24	−5	15	
16	Internacional	19	4	7	8	19	23	−4	15	
17	Vitória	19	4	7	8	15	22	−7	15	
18	Portuguesa	19	3	9	7	18	22	−4	15	
19	São José	19	3	9	7	10	20	−10	15	Relegation to 1991 Campeonato Brasileiro Série B
20	Inter de Limeira	19	4	2	13	9	25	−16	10	Relegation to 1991 Campeonato Brasileiro Série B

== Quarterfinals ==
Team 1	Agg.	Team 2	1st leg	2nd leg
Corinthians	2-1	Atlético Mineiro	2-1	0-0
Santos	1-2	São Paulo	0-1	1-1
Palmeiras	1-2	Grêmio	1-0	0-2
Bragantino	3-4	Bahia	1-1	2-3

== Semifinals ==
Team 1	Agg.	Team 2	1st leg	2nd leg
São Paulo	2-1	Grêmio	2-0	0-1
Corinthians	2-1	Bahia	2-1	0-0

== Finals ==
Team 1	Agg.	Team 2	1st leg	2nd leg
Corinthians	2-0	São Paulo	1-0	1-0

== Final standings ==
Pos	Team	Pld	W	D	L	GF	GA	GD	Pts	Qualification or relegation
1	Corinthians	25	12	8	5	23	20	+3	32	Champion and 1991 Copa Libertadores
2	São Paulo	25	10	7	8	24	18	+6	27	Runners-up
3	Grêmio	23	11	7	5	28	16	+12	29	Semifinalist
4	Bahia	23	8	10	5	25	17	+8	26	Semifinalist
5	Atlético Mineiro	21	7	10	4	20	18	+2	24	Quarterfinalist
6	Palmeiras	21	9	5	7	22	20	+2	23	Quarterfinalist
7	Santos	21	7	9	5	20	15	+5	23	Quarterfinalist
8	Bragantino	21	7	9	5	22	20	+2	23	Quarterfinalist
9	Cruzeiro	19	8	5	6	21	18	+3	21	
10	Goiás	19	7	7	5	22	19	+3	21	
11	Flamengo	19	7	6	6	24	18	+6	20	1991 Copa Libertadores (via Copa do Brasil)
12	Botafogo	19	7	4	8	17	18	−1	18	
13	Náutico	19	4	10	5	13	18	−5	18	
14	Vasco da Gama	19	3	12	4	15	15	0	18	
15	Fluminense	19	5	5	9	19	24	−5	15	
16	Internacional	19	4	7	8	19	23	−4	15	
17	Vitória	19	4	7	8	15	22	−7	15	
18	Portuguesa	19	3	9	7	18	22	−4	15	
19	São José-SP	19	3	9	7	10	20	−10	15	Relegation to Série B
20	Inter de Limeira	19	4	2	13	9	25	−16	10	Relegation to Série B

Rules for classification: 1) points; 2) goal difference; 3) number of goals scored.
