= Guanabara Esporte Clube =

Brazilian football club

Guanabara
- Full name: Guanabara Esporte Clube
- Nickname(s): Auri-anil
- Founded: May 25, 2004
- Dissolved: 2011; 14 years ago
- Ground: Arena Guanabara
- Capacity: 10,000
Home colours	Away colours

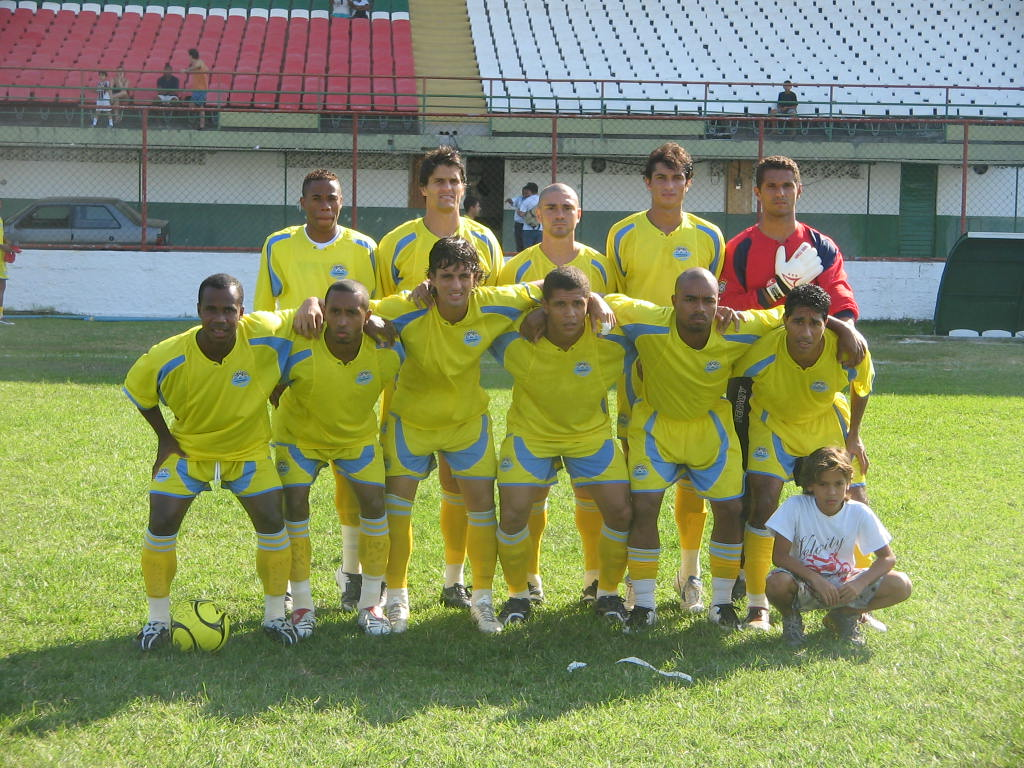
Team photo from the 2007 season

Guanabara Esporte Clube, usually known simply as Guanabara, was a Brazilian football team from the city of Araruama, Rio de Janeiro state. The club was founded on May 25, 2004.

== Stadium ==
Guanabara's home stadium is Estádio Mário Castanho, usually known as Arena Guanabara, inaugurated in 2006. Its maximum capacity is 10,000 people.

== Colors ==
The club's official colors are blue, yellow and white.
