= Rogério Lourenço =

Brazilian football manager and former player

Personal information
- Full name: Rogério Moraes Lourenço
- Date of birth: March 20, 1971 (age 55)
- Place of birth: Rio de Janeiro, Brazil
- Position: Centre back

Youth career
- 1985–1987: Flamengo

Senior career*
Years	Team	Apps	(Gls)
1988–1994	Flamengo	78	(8)
1995–1996	Cruzeiro	21	(0)
1996	→ Vasco da Gama (loan)	10	(1)
1997	Guarani	14	(0)
1998	Paraná Clube	11	(0)
1999	Fluminense	17	(2)
2000–2001	Flamengo	19	(0)
2002–2003	Vila Nova	28	(1)

International career
1987	Brazil U17	3	(0)
1988–1989	Brazil U20	6	(0)

Managerial career
- 2006–2009: Flamengo (youth team)
- 2009–2010: Brazil U-20
- 2010: Flamengo
- 2011: Bahia
- 2011: Saudi Arabia U-20
- 2011: Saudi Arabia (caretaker)
Medal record
Men's football
Representing Brazil (as manager)
FIFA U-20 World Cup
Runner-up	2009
- * Club domestic league appearances and goals

Rogério Moraes Lourenço (born March 20, 1971, in Rio de Janeiro), is a Brazilian football manager and former centre back.

He has managed Saudi Arabia Under-20 team since 28 March 2011.

== Honours ==
=== Player ===
Flamengo

- Taça Guanabara: 1988, 1989, 2001
- Copa do Brasil: 1990
- Taça Rio: 1991, 2000
- Campeonato Carioca: 1991, 2000, 2001
- Campeonato Brasileiro Série A: 1992

Cruzeiro

- Campeonato Mineiro: 1996, 1997
- Copa do Brasil: 1996
- Copa Libertadores: 1997

=== Manager ===
Brazil U-20

- South American Youth Championship: 2009
