= Julio Rivera (footballer) =

Peruvian footballer (born 1967)

Personal information
- Full name: Julio César Rivera González
- Date of birth: 12 April 1967 (age 59)
- Place of birth: Lima, Peru
- Height: 1.68 m (5 ft 6 in)
- Position: Winger

Youth career
- 1973-1983: Alianza Lima

Senior career*
Years	Team	Apps	(Gls)
1984–1988	ETE		
1989–1991	Juvenil Los Ángeles		
1992	Melgar		
1993–1997	Sporting Cristal		
1999–2000	Universitario		
2002	Melgar		
2003	Sport Boys		

International career
1992–1997	Peru	34	(0)
- * Club domestic league appearances and goals

Julio César "Coyote" Rivera González (born 12 April 1967) is a Peruvian former professional footballer who played mainly as a winger.

== Career ==
Julio Rivera developed as a footballer in the Alianza Lima youth system. He then started his senior career with Segunda División side Escuela Técnica del Ejército (ETE). Later he joined Juvenil Los Ángeles and played there with his brother Óscar Rivera. There Julio made his debut in the Torneo Descentralizado and played for the Moquegua club until the end of the 1991 season.

He would then have his chance to play for Arequipa giants FBC Melgar in the 1992 Torneo Descentralizado season.

After an impressive season with Melgar, Rivero joined Sporting Cristal in January 1993.

== Personal life ==
He is a half-brother of Paolo Guerrero, the national team's current captain.

His son, also named Julio Rivera, was murdered during a robbery in Lima. He died after being struck by a vehicle while fleeing from robbers who tried to steal his belongings.

== Honours ==
Sporting Cristal

- Apertura: 1994
- Torneo Descentralizado: 1994, 1995, 1996

Universitario de Deportes

- Torneo Descentralizado: 2000
