= Gélson Baresi =

Brazilian footballer (born 1974)

Personal information
- Full name: Gélson Tardivo Gonçalves Júnior
- Date of birth: 11 May 1974 (age 52)
- Place of birth: Brasília, Federal District, Brazil
- Height: 1.80 m (5 ft 11 in)
- Position: Centre-back

Youth career
- 1990–1993: Flamengo

Senior career*
Years	Team	Apps	(Gls)
1992–1995	Flamengo	117	(3)
1995–1997	Cruzeiro	92	(5)
1998	Coritiba	39	(2)
1999	Fluminense	19	(0)
1999	Atlético Mineiro	7	(0)
2000	Coritiba	3	(1)
2000–2001	Vitória de Setúbal	20	(0)
2002–2003	Coritiba	8	(0)
2004	Paraná	14	(0)
2005	Marília		
2005–2006	Ceará		
2006	CFZ-RJ		

International career
1992–1993	Brazil U20		
1995	Brazil	1	(0)
- * Club domestic league appearances and goals as of 24 January 2024

Gélson Tardivo Gonçalves Júnior (born 11 May 1974), better known as Gélson Baresi, is a Brazilian former professional footballer who played as a centre-back.

== Career ==
Formed in Flamengo's youth categories, in his first year as a professional he participated in winning the Brazilian title in 1992. For the Brazil under-20 team, he was South American and World champion in the category. He transferred to Cruzeiro in 1995 where he won most of the titles of his career, especially the 1996 Copa do Brasil and 1997 Copa Libertadores. Gélson adopted Baresi as a nickname in honor of defender Franco Baresi.

Gélson also played once time for the Brazil national main team, 29 March 1995, against Honduras.

== Honours ==
Flamengo

- Campeonato Brasileiro: 1992
- Taça Guanabara: 1995

Cruzeiro

- Copa Libertadores: 1997
- Copa de Oro: 1995
- Copa Master de Supercopa: 1995
- Copa do Brasil: 1996
- Campeonato Mineiro: 1996, 1997

Coritiba

- Campeonato Paranaense: 2003

Brazil U20

- FIFA U-20 World Cup: 1993
- South American U-20 Championship: 1992
