= Nélio (footballer, born 1971) =

Brazilian footballer

Personal information
- Full name: Nélio da Silva Melo
- Date of birth: 26 January 1971 (age 55)
- Place of birth: Rio de Janeiro, Brazil
- Height: 1.74 m (5 ft 9 in)
- Position: Midfielder

Senior career*
Years	Team	Apps	(Gls)
1990–1998	Flamengo		
1995	→ Guarani (loan)		
1997	→ Fluminense (loan)		
1998	→ Atlético Paranaense (loan)		
1999	Ituano		
1999	Paraná		
2000	Americano		
2000–2001	Haladás	9	(3)
2001	Botafogo-SP		
2002	Botafogo-PB		
2004	Haladás	2	(0)
2006	Guanabara		
2007	Pinheiros		
2008	Ypiranga de Macapá		
2010	Flamengo do Piauí		
- * Club domestic league appearances and goals

Nélio da Silva Melo (born 26 January 1971) better known as Nélio is a Brazilian footballer who played as a midfielder.

== Career ==
Nélio scored three times for Haladás during the 2000–01 Hungarian National Championship I. He then returned to Brazil to play for Botafogo (SP) in August 2001.

He signed for Botafogo (PB) in December 2001. He played in the 2002 Copa do Brasil and the 2002 Campeonato do Nordeste, scoring in the latter competition. He recovered from an injury in April.

Nélio played twice for Haladás during the 2003–04 Hungarian National Championship I.

== Personal life ==
Nélio's brothers Nildeson and Gilberto were also footballers, and represented El Salvador and Brazil respectively.

== Honours ==
Flamengo

- Copa São Paulo de Futebol Júnior: 1990
- Copa do Brasil: 1990
- Copa Rio: 1991
- Campeonato Carioca: 1991, 1996
- Campeonato Brasileiro Série A: 1992

Atlético Mineiro

- Campeonato Mineiro: 1999

Atlético Paranaense

- Campeonato Paranaense: 1998
- Copa Paraná: 1998
