= Marquinhos (footballer, born 1971) =

Brazilian footballer

Personal information
- Full name: Marcos Corrêa dos Santos
- Date of birth: 2 October 1971 (age 55)
- Place of birth: Rio de Janeiro, Brazil
- Height: 1.73 m (5 ft 8 in)
- Position: Midfielder

Senior career*
Years	Team	Apps	(Gls)
1991–1995	Flamengo	80	(2)
1996	Palmeiras		
1996	Juventude	9	(5)
1997	Palmeiras	23	(4)
1997	Bahia		
1998	Palmeiras		
1999	Colo-Colo	33	(11)
2000–2001	Portuguesa	22	(2)
2001–2002	Ponte Preta	23	(6)
2003	Guarani	46	(5)
2004	América (RJ)		
2004	América (RN)		
2005	Madureira		
2005	Macaé		
2006	Madureira		
2006	?		
2007	Ceilândia		
2007	Olaria		
2008	Cidade Azul		
2008	Guanabara		

International career
1991	Brazil U-20		
1993	Brazil	1	(0)
- * Club domestic league appearances and goals

Marcos Corrêa dos Santos (born 2 October 1971 in Rio de Janeiro), sportingly known as Marquinhos, is a former Brazilian footballer who played as a midfielder.

== Career ==
Besides Brazil, Marquinhos played in Chile for Colo-Colo in 1999.

His last club was Guanabara in 2008.

At international level, he was part of the Brazilian squad that took part at the 1993 Copa América.
