= 1997 Copa Libertadores =

38th season of Copa Libertadores

1997 Copa Libertadores de América
Libertadores 1997

Tournament details
- Dates: February 19 - August 13
- Teams: 21 (from 10 associations)

Final positions
- Champions: (Brazil) Cruzeiro (2nd title)
- Runners-up: (Peru) Sporting Cristal

Tournament statistics
- Matches played: 90
- Goals scored: 247 (2.74 per match)
- Top scorer: (Argentina) Alberto Acosta (11 goals)

The 1997 edition of Copa Libertadores was won by Cruzeiro of Brazil, after defeating Sporting Cristal of Peru in the final. This was Cruzeiro's second title, their first being the 1976 edition. Cruzeiro's 1997 championship is the only time any club has won the Libertadores after losing the first 3 matches in the competition.

== Teams ==
Association	Team (Berth)	Entry stage	Qualification method
(Argentina) Argentina; 2+1 berths	River Plate (Argentina 1)	Round of 16	1996 Copa Libertadores champions
(Argentina) Argentina; 2+1 berths	Vélez Sarsfield (Argentina 2)	Group stage	1995 Apertura, 1996 Clausura champions
(Argentina) Argentina; 2+1 berths	Racing (Argentina 3)	Group stage	1995 Apertura runners-up
(Bolivia) Bolivia; 2 berths	Bolívar (Bolivia 1)	Group stage	1996 Liga de Fútbol Profesional Boliviano champions
(Bolivia) Bolivia; 2 berths	Oriente Petrolero (Bolivia 2)	Group stage	1996 Liga de Fútbol Profesional Boliviano runners-up
(Brazil) Brazil; 2 berths	Grêmio (Brazil 1)	Group stage	1996 Brasileirão Série A champions
(Brazil) Brazil; 2 berths	Cruzeiro (Brazil 2)	Group stage	1996 Copa do Brasil champions
(Chile) Chile; 2 berths	Colo-Colo (Chile 1)	Group stage	1996 Primera División of Chile champions
(Chile) Chile; 2 berths	Universidad Católica (Chile 2)	Group stage	1996 Liguilla para Copa Libertadores winners
(Colombia) Colombia; 2 berths	Deportivo Cali (Colombia 1)	Group stage	1995–96 Categoría Primera A champions
(Colombia) Colombia; 2 berths	Millonarios (Colombia 2)	Group stage	1995–96 Categoría Primera A runners-up
(Ecuador) Ecuador; 2 berths	El Nacional (Ecuador 1)	Group stage	1996 Serie A de Ecuador champions
(Ecuador) Ecuador; 2 berths	Emelec (Ecuador 2)	Group stage	1996 Serie A de Ecuador runners-up
(Paraguay) Paraguay; 2 berths	Cerro Porteño (Paraguay 1)	Group stage	1996 Primera División champions
(Paraguay) Paraguay; 2 berths	Guaraní (Paraguay 2)	Group stage	1996 Primera División runners-up
(Peru) Peru; 2 berths	Sporting Cristal (Peru 1)	Group stage	1996 Torneo Descentralizado champions
(Peru) Peru; 2 berths	Alianza Lima (Peru 2)	Group stage	1996 Liguilla para Copa Libertadores winners
(Uruguay) Uruguay; 2 berths	Nacional (Uruguay 1)	Group stage	1996 Liguilla para Copa Libertadores winners
(Uruguay) Uruguay; 2 berths	Peñarol (Uruguay 2)	Group stage	1996 Liguilla para Copa Libertadores play-off winners
(Venezuela) Venezuela; 2 berths	Minervén (Venezuela 1)	Group stage	1995–96 Primera División champions
(Venezuela) Venezuela; 2 berths	Mineros de Guayana (Venezuela 2)	Group stage	1995–96 Primera División runners-up

== Group stage ==
River Plate bye to the second round as holders.

=== Group 1 ===
Pos	Team	Pld	W	D	L	GF	GA	GD	Pts
1	(Bolivia) Bolívar	6	3	1	2	15	10	+5	10
2	(Bolivia) Oriente Petrolero	6	2	2	2	9	10	−1	8
3	(Paraguay) Guaraní	6	2	2	2	8	11	−3	8
4	(Paraguay) Cerro Porteño	6	2	1	3	7	8	−1	7

=== Group 2 ===
Pos	Team	Pld	W	D	L	GF	GA	GD	Pts
1	(Argentina) Vélez Sársfield	6	4	1	1	10	5	+5	13
2	(Ecuador) El Nacional	6	3	0	3	5	7	−2	9
3	(Argentina) Racing	6	2	1	3	7	7	0	7
4	(Ecuador) Emelec	6	1	2	3	7	10	−3	5

=== Group 3 ===
Pos	Team	Pld	W	D	L	GF	GA	GD	Pts
1	(Chile) Colo-Colo	6	5	1	0	12	4	+8	16
2	(Chile) Universidad Católica	6	2	2	2	15	6	+9	8
3	(Venezuela) Minervén	6	2	1	3	3	9	−6	7
4	(Venezuela) Mineros de Guayana	6	0	2	4	2	13	−11	2

=== Group 4 ===
Pos	Team	Pld	W	D	L	GF	GA	GD	Pts
1	(Brazil) Grêmio	6	4	0	2	10	3	+7	12
2	(Brazil) Cruzeiro	6	3	0	3	6	5	+1	9
3	(Peru) Sporting Cristal	6	2	2	2	4	5	−1	8
4	(Peru) Alianza Lima	6	1	2	3	2	9	−7	5

=== Group 5 ===
Pos	Team	Pld	W	D	L	GF	GA	GD	Pts
1	(Uruguay) Peñarol	6	4	0	2	12	10	+2	12
2	(Colombia) Millonarios	6	3	1	2	10	8	+2	10
3	(Uruguay) Nacional	6	2	1	3	6	9	−3	7
4	(Colombia) Deportivo Cali	6	1	2	3	9	10	−1	5

== Bracket ==
Round of 16
(Argentina) River Plate	3	1	4 (3)
(Argentina) Racing	3	1	4 (5)
(Uruguay) Peñarol	0	3	3 (3)
(Colombia) Millonarios	2	1	3 (2)
(Argentina) Vélez Sarsfield	0	0	0
(Peru) Sporting Cristal	0	1	1
(Bolivia) Bolívar	1	7	8
(Venezuela) Minervén	1	0	1
(Brazil) Cruzeiro	0	2	2 (5)
(Ecuador) El Nacional	1	1	2 (3)
(Brazil) Grêmio	1	2	3 (2)
(Paraguay) Guaraní	2	1	3 (1)
(Chile) Colo-Colo	3	1	4
(Uruguay) Nacional	1	2	3
(Bolivia) Oriente Petrolero	0	1	1
(Chile) U. Católica	4	5	9

Quarterfinals
(Argentina) Racing	0	1	1 (3)
(Uruguay) Peñarol	1	0	1 (2)
(Peru) Sporting Cristal	1	3	4
(Bolivia) Bolívar	2	0	2
(Brazil) Cruzeiro	2	1	3
(Brazil) Grêmio	0	2	2
(Chile) Colo-Colo	1	3	4
(Chile) U. Católica	2	1	3

Semifinals
(Argentina) Racing	3	1	4
(Peru) Sporting Cristal	2	4	6
(Brazil) Cruzeiro	1	2	3 (4)
(Chile) Colo-Colo	0	3	3 (1)

Final
(Peru) Sporting Cristal	0	0	0
(Brazil) Cruzeiro	0	1	1

== Round of 16 ==
Team 1	Agg.	Team 2	1st leg	2nd leg
Racing (Argentina)	4-4 (5-3p)	(Argentina) River Plate	3-3	1-1
Sporting Cristal (Peru)	1-0	(Argentina) Vélez Sársfield	0-0	1-0
Guaraní (Paraguay)	3-3 (1-2p)	(Brazil) Grêmio	2-1	1-2
Minervén (Venezuela)	1-8	(Bolivia) Bolívar	1-1	0-7
Millonarios (Colombia)	3-3 (2-3p)	(Uruguay) Peñarol	2-0	1-3
Universidad Católica (Chile)	9-1	(Bolivia) Oriente Petrolero	4-0	5-1
Nacional (Uruguay)	3-4	(Chile) Colo-Colo	1-3	2-1
El Nacional (Ecuador)	2-2 (3-5p)	(Brazil) Cruzeiro	1-0	1-2

== Quarter-finals ==
Team 1	Agg.	Team 2	1st leg	2nd leg
Bolívar (Bolivia)	2-4	(Peru) Sporting Cristal	2-1	0-3
Universidad Católica (Chile)	3-4	(Chile) Colo-Colo	2-1	1-3
Cruzeiro (Brazil)	3-2	(Brazil) Grêmio	2-0	1-2
Peñarol (Uruguay)	1-1 (2-3p)	(Argentina) Racing	1-0	0-1

== Semi-finals ==
Team 1	Agg.	Team 2	1st leg	2nd leg
Cruzeiro (Brazil)	3-3 (4-1p)	(Chile) Colo-Colo	1-0	2-3
Racing (Argentina)	4-6	(Peru) Sporting Cristal	3-2	1-4

== Finals ==
Team 1	Agg.	Team 2	1st leg	2nd leg
Sporting Cristal (Peru)	0-1	(Brazil) Cruzeiro	0-0	0-1

== Champion ==
Copa Libertadores 1997

Second title

== Top goalscorers ==
11 goals

- Alberto Acosta

9 goals

- Antonio Vidal González

8 goals

- Ivo Basay

== Broadcasting rights ==
=== Americas ===
- (Organization of American States) Latin America: Sportsnet, TSN, TVC Sports, Cable Mágico Deportes and Best Cable Sports
- (Caribbean Community) Caribbean: Flow Sports
- Peru: Global Televisión
