= SE Palmeiras =

Brazilian professional football club

Palmeiras
- Full name: Sociedade Esportiva Palmeiras
- Nicknames: Alviverde (Green and White); Verdão (Big Green); Periquito (Plain parakeet); Porco (Pig, adopted in 1987); Palestra Itália
- Founded: 26 August 1914; 112 years ago, as Palestra Itália; 14 September 1942; 84 years ago, as Sociedade Esportiva Palmeiras
- Ground: Nubank Parque
- Capacity: 43,713
- President: Leila Pereira
- Head coach: Abel Ferreira
- League: Campeonato Brasileiro Série A Campeonato Paulista
- 2025 2025: Série A, 2nd of 20; Paulista, 2nd of 16
- Website: palmeiras.com.br
Home colors	Away colors	Third colors

The Sociedade Esportiva Palmeiras (Brazilian Portuguese: [sosjeˈdadʒi ispoʁˈtʃivɐ pawˈmejɾɐs]), commonly known as Palmeiras, is a Brazilian professional football club based in the city of São Paulo, in the district of Perdizes. Palmeiras is one of the most popular clubs in Brazil, with around 15 million fans. The football team plays in the Campeonato Paulista, the state of São Paulo's premier state league, as well as in the Brasileirão Série A, the top tier of the Brazilian football league system.

The Sociedade Esportiva Palmeiras was founded by Italian immigrants on 26 August 1914, as "Palestra Itália" (pronounced [paˌlɛstɾiˈtaljɐ]). However, the club changed its name on 14 September 1942, as a result of Brazil joining the Allies in the Second World War against Italy ("Itália" in Portuguese) and the Axis powers. Since then, Palmeiras has won 18 top-tier national competitions, including a record 12 Campeonato Brasileiro Série A, 4 Copas do Brasil, 1 Copa dos Campeões, and 1 Supercopa do Brasil, the 1999, 2020 and 2021 Copa Libertadores, the 2022 Recopa Sudamericana, and the 1998 Copa Mercosul. The club has also been successful at a regional level as they have won 5 Interstate titles (Torneio Rio – São Paulo), and 27 State Championship titles (Campeonato Paulista).

Palmeiras currently occupies the second position on CBF and the first position CONMEBOL rankings, and was the first Brazilian club to win the IFFHS Men's Club World Ranking in 2021.

The squads for all five FIFA World Cups and two Olympic gold medals won by Brazil have had at least one Palmeiras player in them, an honour shared with cross-city rivals São Paulo.

The name Palmeiras usually refers to the football club, yet its athletic department competes in more than a dozen different sports. These include basketball and roller hockey (rink hockey), American football, archery, and karate among others.

== History ==
First crest in 1915

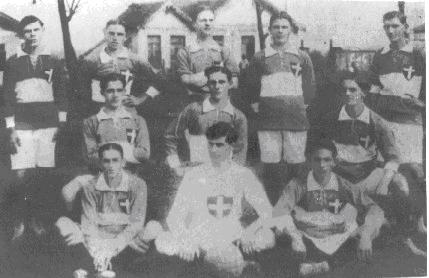
Photo of Palestra Italia in 1916

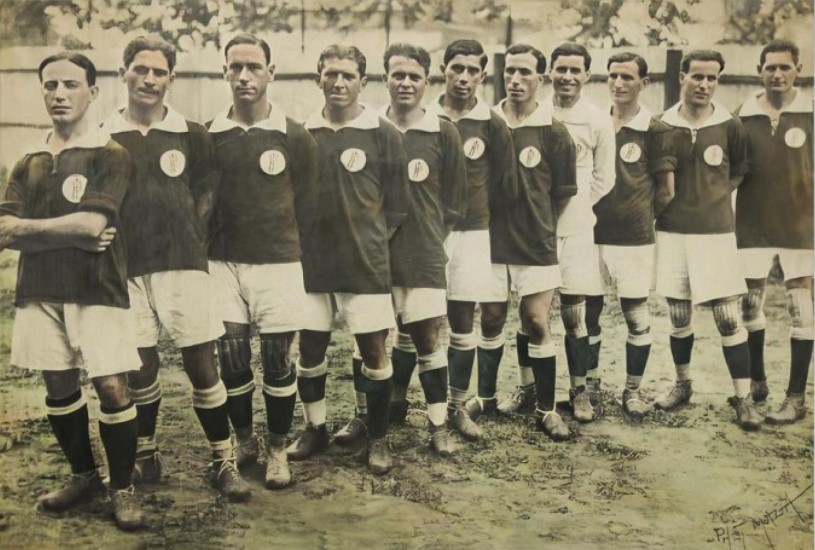
Photo of Palestra Italia State Champion in 1920

=== Foundation ===
At the beginning of the 20th century, several young Italians decided to start a club whose main goal was to form a football team that would be representative of the Italian community, and face the big names of São Paulo's football elite. Just over three decades earlier, Italy had been unified – a fact that was not known to some Italian-Brazilians and to some non-Italian Brazilians.

There were numerous Italian clubs, but each one represented an Italian province or was geared to activities other than football. At the time, the game was starting to take hold and drew many players and fans.

The founders of the club sought out the Fanfulla newspaper, which was the media outlet that defended the interests of Italians in Brazil, and entrusted young Vincenzo Ragognetti – another supporter of the idea – to draft an invitation to those interested in forming a sports club.

After several meetings, 46 interested individuals (led by Luigi Marzo and Luigi Cervo) gathered at the Alhambra Room on what is now Rua do Riachuelo, and founded a sports club for all Italian-Brazilians named "Palestra Italia" on 26 August 1914. Ezequiel Simone was named club president. The Italian Consulate in São Paulo became interested in the new club because it would help spread the word among Italians that their country now had one flag and one anthem.

After some initial difficulties, Palestra Italia played its first game in the town of Votorantim (São Paulo State) – beating Savoia 2–0 with goals from Bianco and Alegretti to win the Taça Savoia, the club's first title.

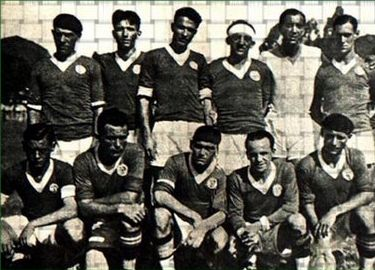
Photo of Palestra Italia in 1932

=== 1920–1945: First state title and new stadium ===
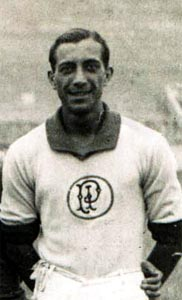
Oscar Francisco Nascimento in 1930

In 1916, the team joined the city's main sports league and played its first official championship match. The following year it would be runner-up in the São Paulo State Championship, facing Corinthians for the first time. Palestra won that initial game 3–0 with three goals from Caetano; it also won the rematch 3–1 of what would become the team's chief rivalry. In 1920, Palestra Italia captured the São Paulo State championship with a victory over the rugged Paulistano squad in the deciding match.

Palestra continued to grow as a sports club and also began acquiring more assets. Estádio Palestra Itália, purchased in 1920, was remodeled and expanded in 1933, when it became the first Brazilian stadium with concrete grandstands and barbed-wire fences. Starting in 1964, the playing field would be suspended, which gave fans a complete, broad view and also created space in the lower levels.

The club continued to grow and win more championships, and at the outset of the 1930s became the three-time São Paulo State football and basketball champion – a feat that prompted Palestra fans to chant in celebration: "With the feet or with the hands, Palestra is the best in the land."

=== A Leader Dies, A Champion is Born ===
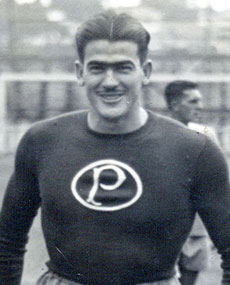
Oberdan Cattani

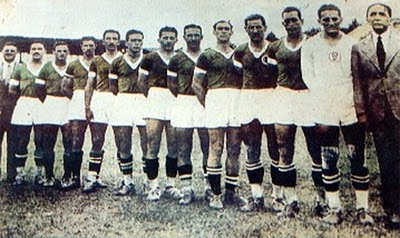
Photo of Palestra Italia State Champion in 1940

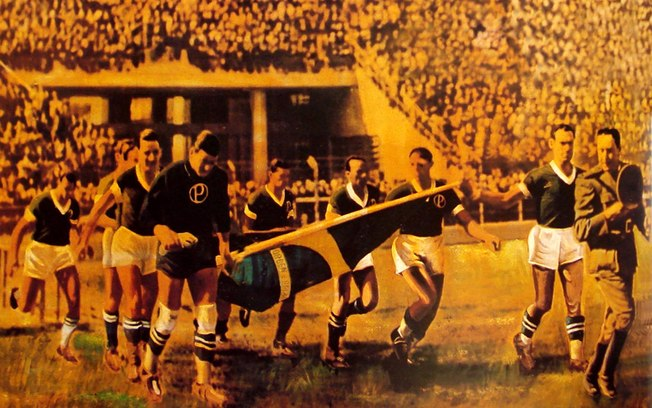
Palmeiras in 1942

In 1942 during World War II, the government of President Getúlio Vargas issued a decree banning any organization from using names related to the Axis Powers (Germany, Italy, and Japan). Palestra Italia was forced to change its name and became Palestra São Paulo ("palestra" is a Greek word, loosely translated as "gymnasium," which therefore did not violate this rule). However, the change still did not soothe political and sporting pressures to alter the name completely. At risk of forfeiting all its assets to other clubs and being ejected from the championship that it currently led, Palestra was forced to change its name a second time. The night before the last game of the state championship, scheduled for 20 September 1942, the Palestra board of directors held a heated meeting and changed the club's name. When the debate reached its peak, Dr. Mario Minervino took the floor and asked club secretary, Dr. Pascoal W. Byron Giuliano, to note in the minutes:

– "They don't want us to be Palestra, so then we shall be Palmeiras – born to be champions."

Tensions flared during the final league match, where Palmeiras's opponent was São Paulo Futebol Clube (SPFC), which was laying claim to the assets of the former Palestra Italia.

Palmeiras took the field carrying the Brazilian flag under the leadership of army Captain Adalberto Mendes. Palmeiras was leading the match by 3–1 when a penalty was given in its favor. At that moment, the SPFC ordered its players to consider the Palmeiras squad an enemy of the homeland and pulled its side off the field amid jeers from even the club's own fans. The celebrations began on the spot. The next day, newspapers contained a photograph of Palmeiras entering the field with the headline: "A Leader Dies, A Champion is Born."

=== Copa Rio: 1951 ===
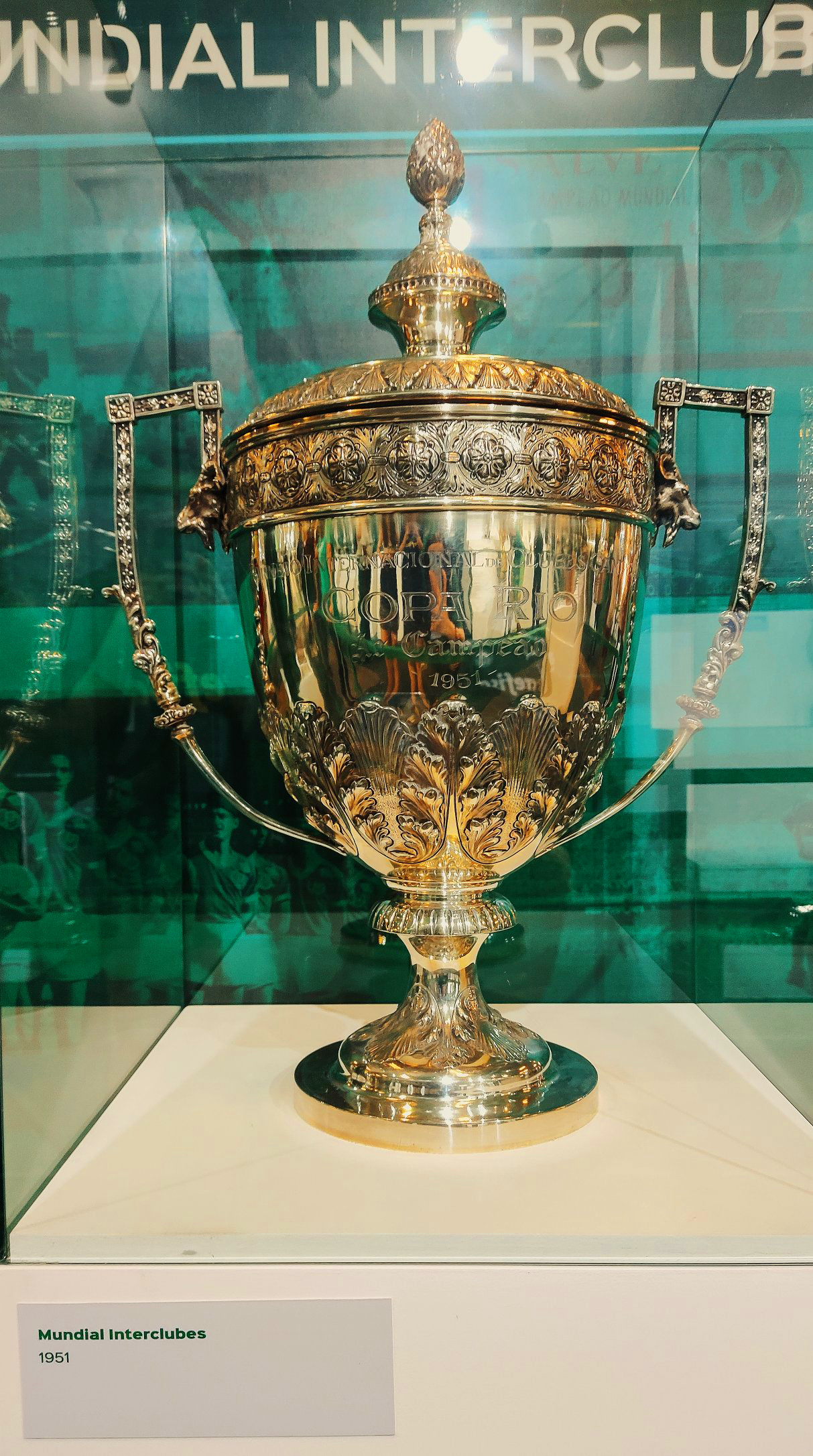
Copa Rio 1951 Trophy

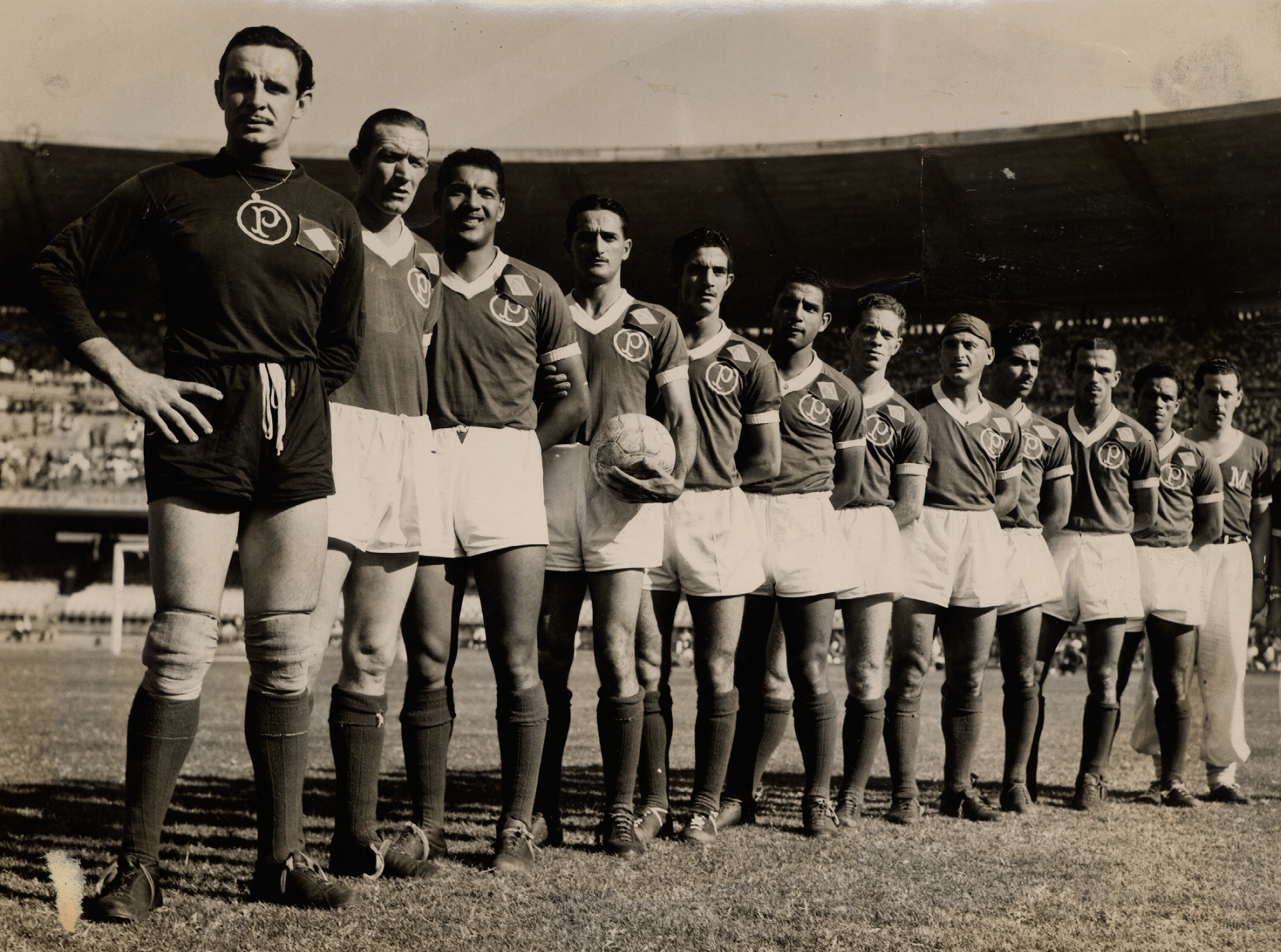
Palmeiras team profiled before the final against Juventus in 1951 at Maracanã Stadium

On 27 October 2017, the FIFA Council changed its position: while not promoting the statistical unification of the Intercontinental Cup and the Club World Cup, in respect to the history of the two tournaments (which merged in 2005), it made the Intercontinental Cup an official world title, recognizing all its winners as club world champions with the same title as FIFA Club World Cup winners: "FIFA Club World Champions." In April 2019, FIFA president Gianni Infantino, in an interview with Brazilian media, reiterated FIFA's perspective that only the winners of the Intercontinental Cup and the Club World Cup were officially world champions. Also in April 2019, former FIFA president Joseph Blatter (who held office until December 2015) again stated to the Brazilian press that Palmeiras had been recognized as world club champions by FIFA in 2014.

In February 2021, the FIFA website praised Palmeiras's victory in the Copa Rio thus:

"A world championship had been dreamed of and discussed for years by some of football's foremost shot-callers – Jules Rimet, Ottorino Barassi and Stanley Rous among them – and was finally scheduled for 1951 in Brazil, which had recently hosted the FIFA World Cup. The eight-team competition involved some of Europe's top teams, Uruguayan behemoths Nacional and Brazilian duo Vasco da Gama and Palmeiras, who qualified as Rio-Sao Paulo Tournament winners".

In any case, the Copa Rio was the first intercontinental football tournament to bring together the most prestigious clubs from the most important leagues around the world. The matches were played at the same locations in which the 1950 FIFA World Cup games had been played the year before. The tournament triggered discussions within continental football federations about exploring club football internationally, which eventually led to the launch of international championships such as the European Cup (now known as the UEFA Champions League) and the Copa Libertadores.

In the end, Palmeiras won the first intercontinental championship of the pre-international era of football, making the 'Copa Rio' one of the most important starting points of globalization for football. The 'Copa Rio' was important at the time but Palmeiras is still not recognized as an intercontinental champion by FIFA.

=== The "Academy" becomes a Brazilian giant ===
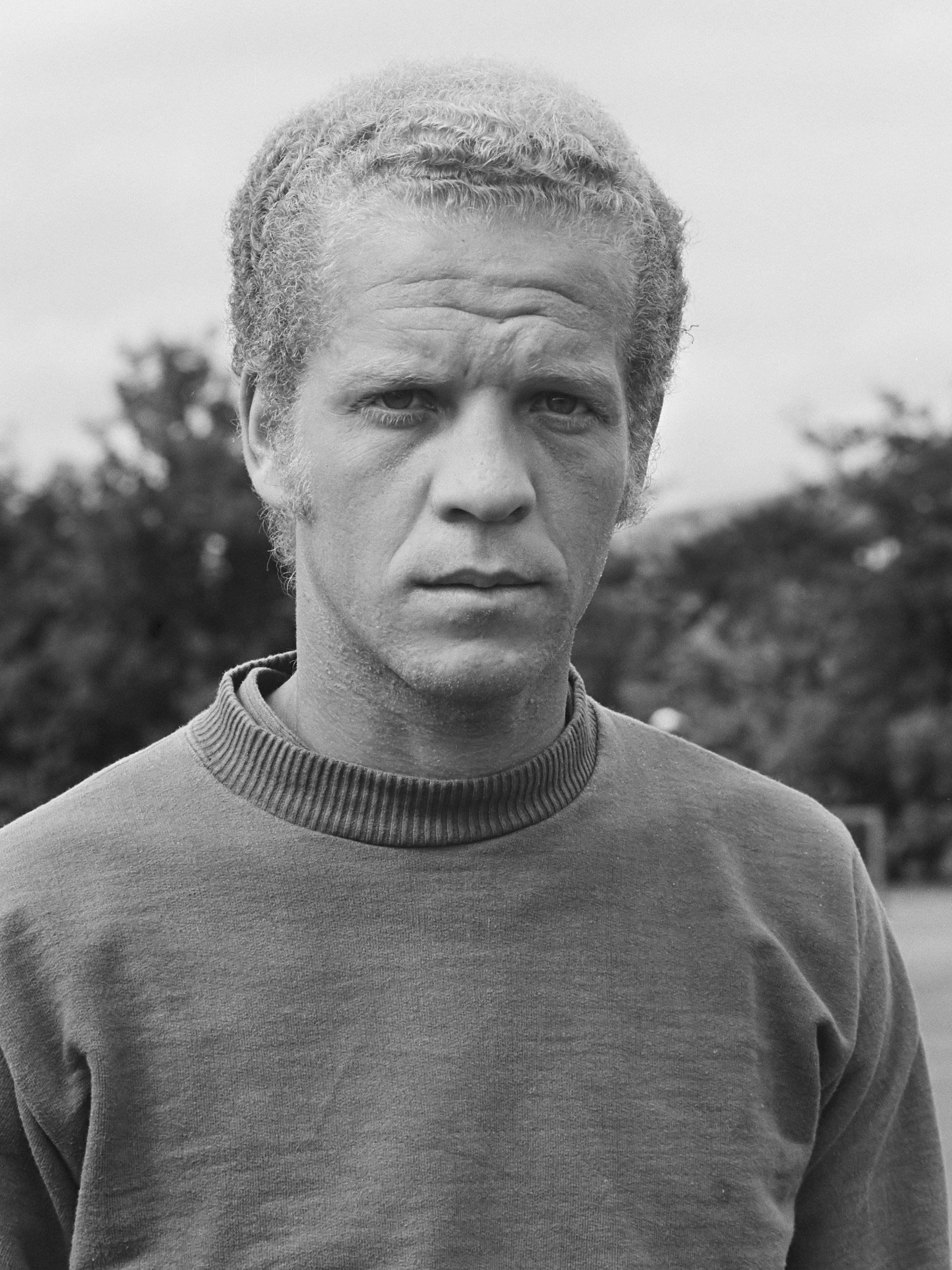
Ademir da Guia

In the 1960s, the standard of quality of Palmeiras played – led by the one who would come to symbolize this period of football excellence, Ademir da Guia – led the Palestra Italia team to be called the "Academy" of Brazilian football.

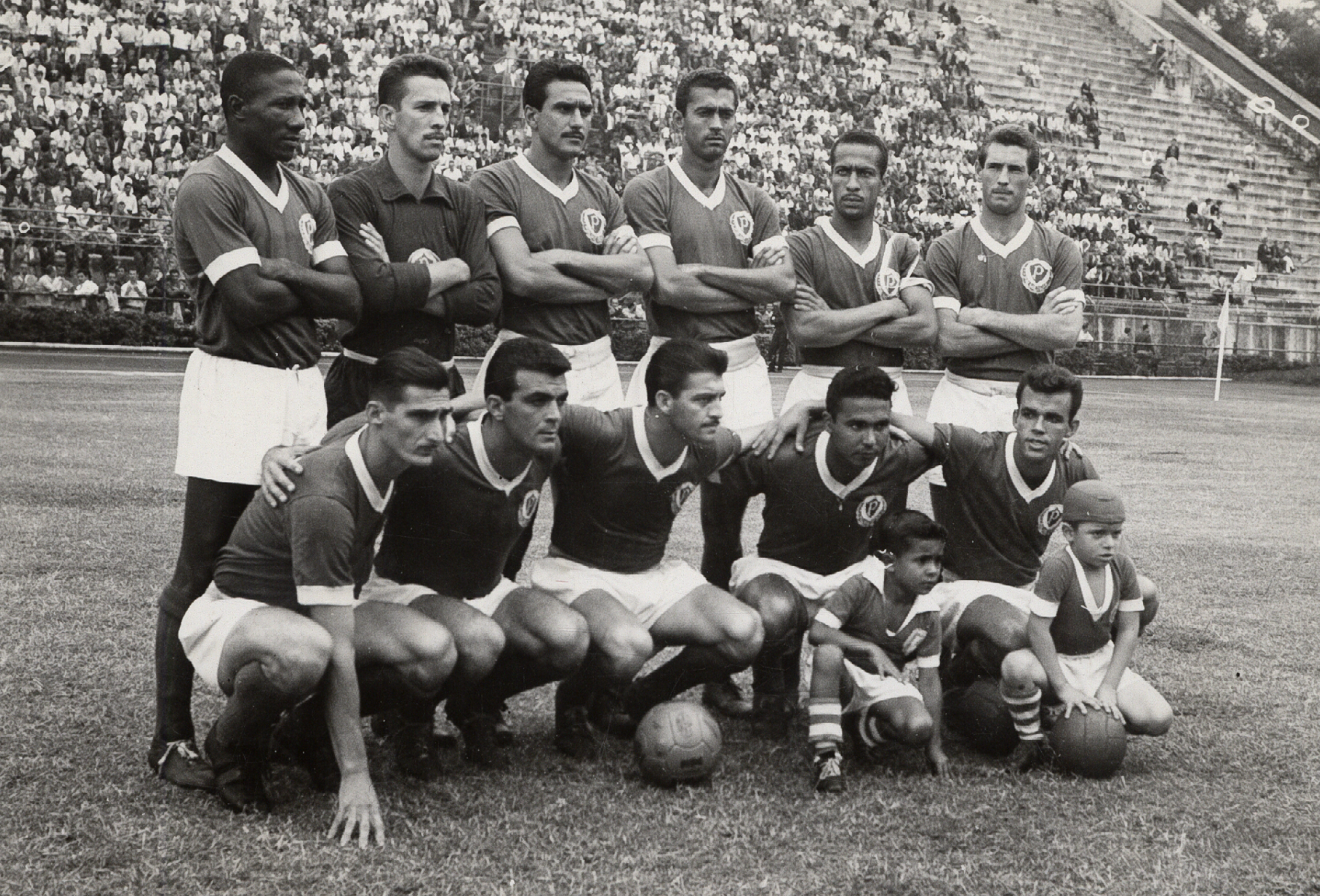
The First Academy in 1960

The first academy had Djalma Santos, Djalma Dias, Dudu, Ademir da Guia, Julinho Botelho, Vavá, Liminha and Chinesinho as some of the outstanding players.

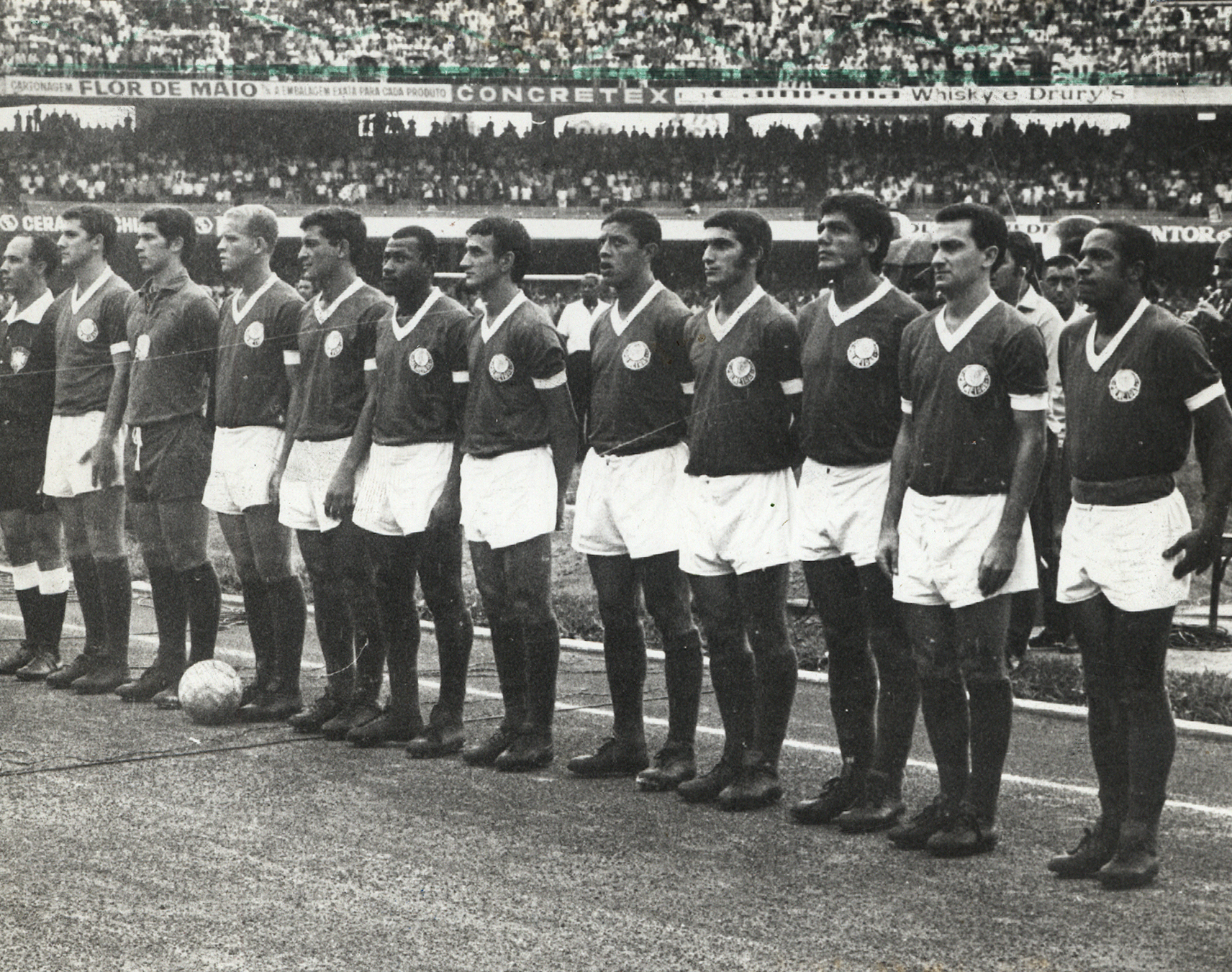
The Second Academy in 1969

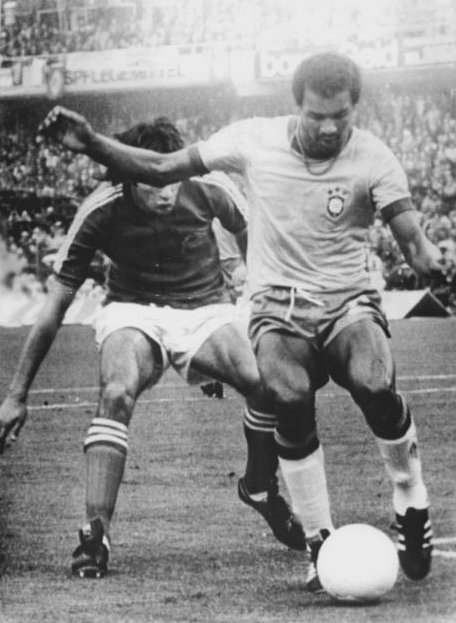
Luís Pereira (right) at the 1974 FIFA World Cup

Managed by Filpo Núñez, Palmeiras players won the most important national competition in 1965, the Rio – São Paulo championship, with stand-out performances. Blow-outs against top rivals included seven goals scored against Santos, five against Botafogo in their home stadium of the Maracanã, five against São Paulo, and another four scored against Vasco. The title came to Palmeiras in another lopsided victory against Botafogo at Pacaembú Stadium in São Paulo.

That same year, the Brazilian Sports Federation (CBD) used the entire Palmeiras roster to inaugurate the Mineirão Stadium and represent Brazil in an official national team match against Uruguay for the Inconfidência Cup. The day that it donned the green and white, Palmeiras as Brazil was victorious 3–0 over the Uruguayan blue.

In the previous year, Palmeiras had won the Rio de Janeiro Quadricentennial Cup (Torneio do IV Centenário do Rio de Janeiro de 1965) by beating the Paraguay national team 5–2 and besting Peñarol of Uruguay in the final.

By the end of the 1960s, Palmeiras won the Copa do Brasil and the Roberto Gomes Pedrosa tournament – the Brazilian Championship equivalent at the time.

These victories laid the groundwork for the second Palmeiras Academy, with players like Luís Pereira, Leivinha, Emerson Leão, Dudu, Ademir da Guia and César.

Led by Osvaldo Brandão, the team captured several titles in the 1970s. It was a three-time São Paulo state champion – emerging undefeated in one of those tournaments – a two-time Brazilian champion, a three-time winner of Spain's Ramón de Carranza Trophy, and the winner of Argentina's Mar del Plata Trophy – considered the South American Club Championship.

=== 1980s: The lost decade ===
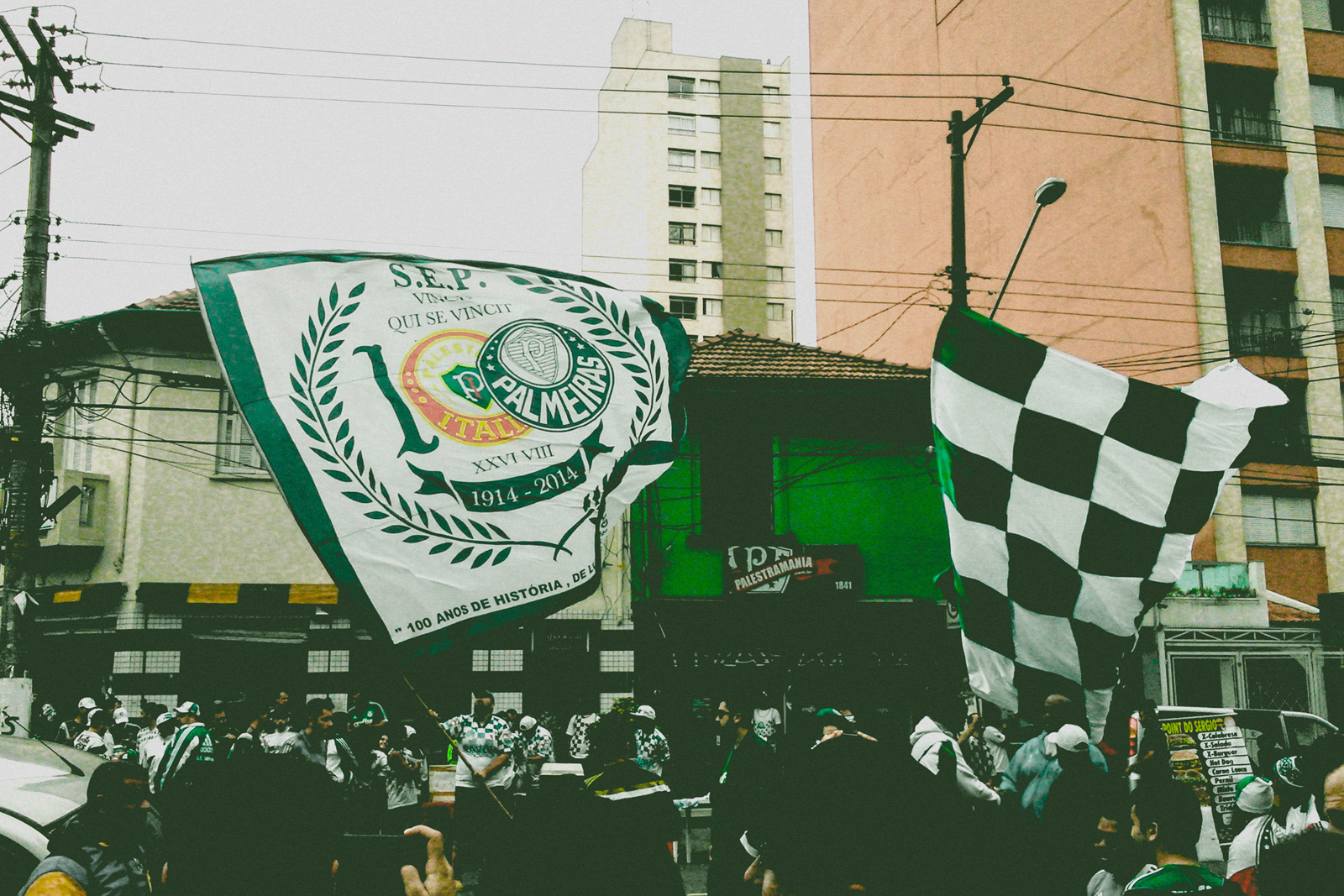
Palmeiras's supporters

Already used to victories at the "Academy" in the 1960s and 1970s, Palmeiras fans saw the 1980s come and go without championships or titles. In 1986, Palmeiras fielded a good team – routing Corinthians 5–1 and playing a historic game in the semifinals of the São Paulo State Championship against that same rival, prevailing 3–0. Ten years after winning its last state title, Palmeiras finally arrived at the final of the state championship, but lost to Inter de Limeira.

On 29 October 1986, Palmeiras fans adopted the pig as their mascot. At a game against Santos, the rival fans were chanting "pig"; the Palmeiras crowd responded with "Come On Pig!! Come On Pig!! Olé Olé Olé..." and "Go Piiiig...." A few days later, Placar sports magazine popularized the new nickname when it published an issue with Jorginho Putinatti – the symbol of that generation – holding a pig in his lap.

There were two noteworthy events during this decade. In the 1983 State Championship against Santos, referee José de Assis Aragão scored a goal for Palmeiras in the 47th minute of the second half. Striker Jorginho kicked the ball inside the penalty area, the ball was on its way out, but hit Aragão – who was on the goal line about a meter from the goal and went into the Santos net. The game ended in a 2–2 tie – much to the chagrin of Santos.

The second unexpected event occurred on 11 November 1988, when striker Gaúcho saved two penalties against Flamengo in a game for the Brazilian Championship at Maracanã. Gaúcho was put in goal after keeper Zetti broke his leg in the final minutes of the match. The game ended in a tie, and advanced to the penalty shootout phase. During the shootout, Gaúcho stopped two shots, from Aldair and Zinho. To cap off the evening, he scored a penalty himself while wearing the goalkeeper's jersey.

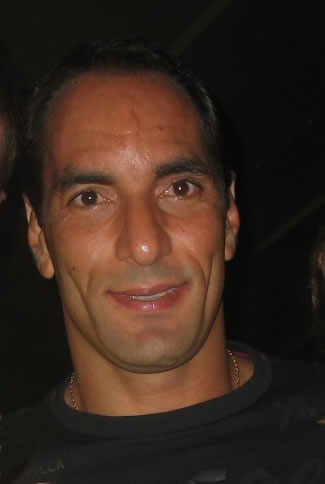
Edmundo

In 1989, Palmeiras had another chance to win a title. Undefeated until the penultimate match, the team was eliminated when it lost to Bragantino in the semifinals of the São Paulo State Championship. The 1980s ended without significant victories, but the 1990s would make up for that.

=== The end of the 20th century – The Greatest in Brazil ===
Palmeiras found itself in the midst of a sixteen-year drought, without any significant trophies, until 1992, when the club signed a sponsorship deal with Italian dairy giant Parmalat. The deal lasted for eight years and quickly turned Palmeiras into Brazil's richest club.

In the 1990s, Palmeiras enjoyed countless achievements, winning numerous important titles. In the first full year of the relationship with Parmalat, the team won the Campeonato Paulista in 1993, beating its biggest rival Corinthians in the final, under the command of coach Vanderlei Luxemburgo and with a squad featuring Evair, Zinho, Edmundo, César Sampaio, Mazinho, Antônio Carlos, Roberto Carlos and Edílson .

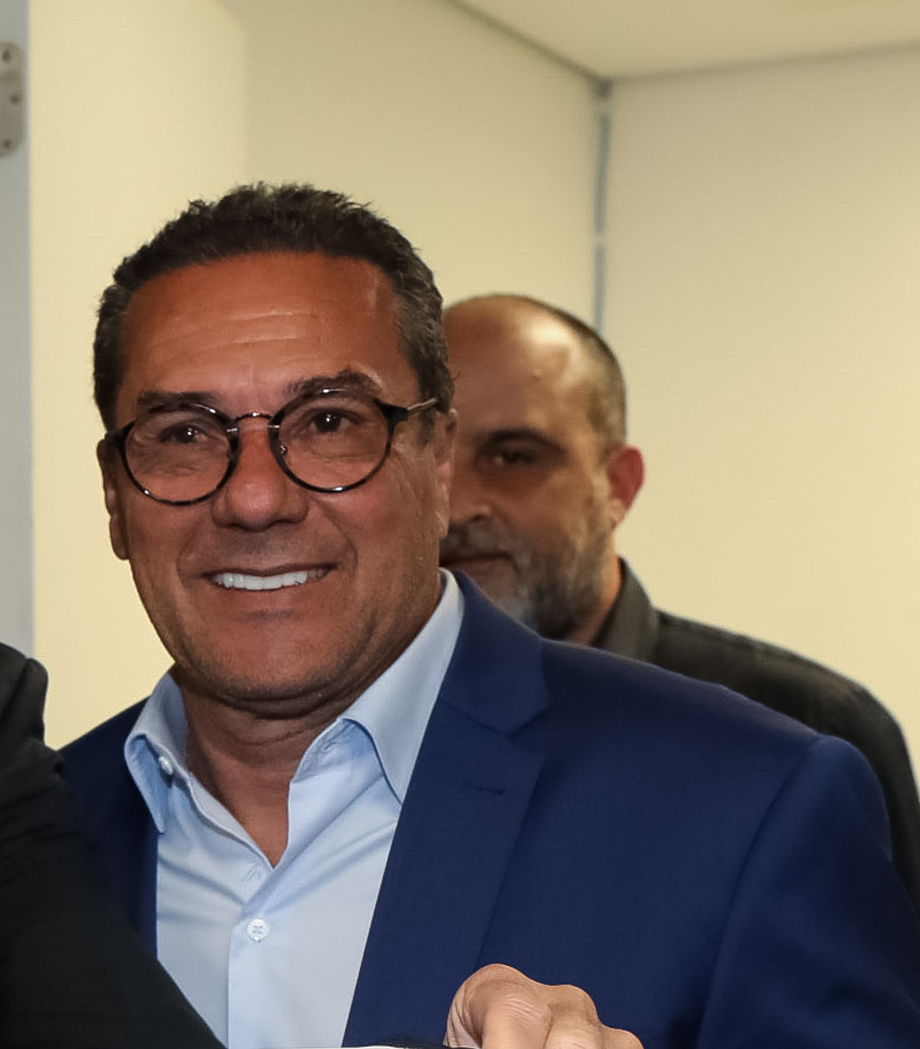
Vanderlei Luxemburgo

That same year, Palmeiras also captured the Rio-São Paulo Championship, once again against Corinthians, and the 1993 Campeonato Brasileiro Série A. In 1994, it achieved the unprecedented feat of winning consecutive state championships and Brazilian championships, the latter victory coming against Corinthians once again.

In 1996 Palmeiras won the friendly Euro-America Cup, defeating the Bundesliga champions and future 1996-97 UEFA Champions League and 1997 Intercontinental Cup champions Borussia Dortmund by a score of 6–1. Later, the team handily won the 1996 Campeonato Paulista, scoring more than 100 goals and accumulating historic victories, such as a 6–0 thrashing of Santos FC. Rivaldo, Muller, Djalminha and Luizão were the standouts of this historic team.

Palmeiras also had a remarkable sequence of games in the 1996 Copa do Brasil, beating Clube Atletico Mineiro 5-0 (7–1 on aggregate) and defeating the 1995 Copa Libertadores winners Gremio in the semifinals, but the team eventually suffered a surprise loss to Cruzeiro EC, who would eventually win the 1997 Copa Libertadores.

In 1998, Palmeiras won the 1998 Copa do Brasil and the 1998 Copa Mercosur, both against Cruzeiro EC. The latter was the first official international cup won by Palmeiras since 1951.

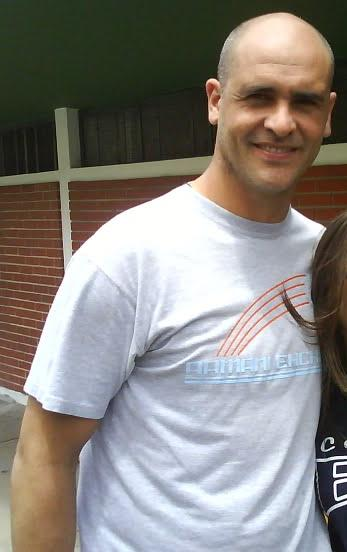
Marcos

=== 1999 – The first Copa Libertadores trophy ===
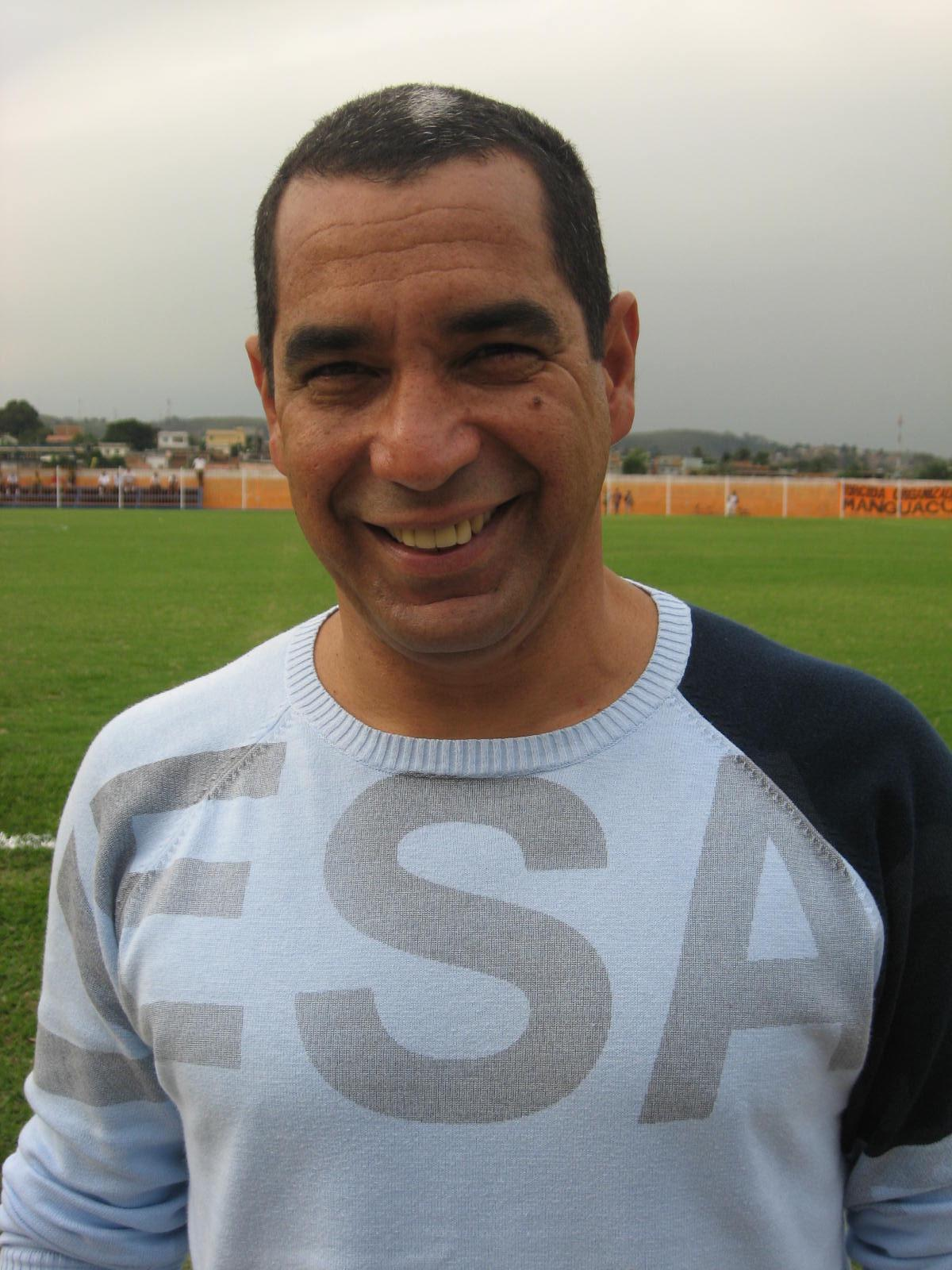
Zinho

Already famous for winning the 1991 Copa do Brasil, 1994 Copa do Brasil, 1995 Copa Libertadores, and 1996 Campeonato Brasileiro Série A, Luiz Felipe Scolari was hired as manager in 1997 and led the team to a number of important trophies, including their first Copa Libertadores.

Palmeiras faced a challenging road to the finals, defeating the defending champions Vasco da Gama in the round of 16 by 5–3 on aggregate (including coming back to secure a historic 4–2 away victory), rival Corinthians in the quarterfinals on penalties, and 1996 Copa Libertadores winners River Plate in the semifinals by 3–1 on aggregate.

The final matches were against Deportivo Cali from Colombia, the 1978 Copa Libertadores runners up. In the first leg in Cali, Deportivo beat Palmeiras 1–0. In the second leg, at Estádio Palestra Itália, Palmeiras beat Deportivo 2–1 and won the competition in a penalty shootout.

Important players from that team were World Cup winners Marcos, Zinho and Roque Júnior, as well as Alex, Evair, Paulo Nunes, and César Sampaio.

That same year, Palmeiras disputed the 1999 Intercontinental Cup in Tokyo, but were defeated by Manchester United of England. Despite enjoying the better of the game, Palmeiras had a goal from Alex ruled out, and conceded a goal after an uncharacteristic mistake by Marcos, one of the team's stars and future 2002 FIFA World Cup champion.

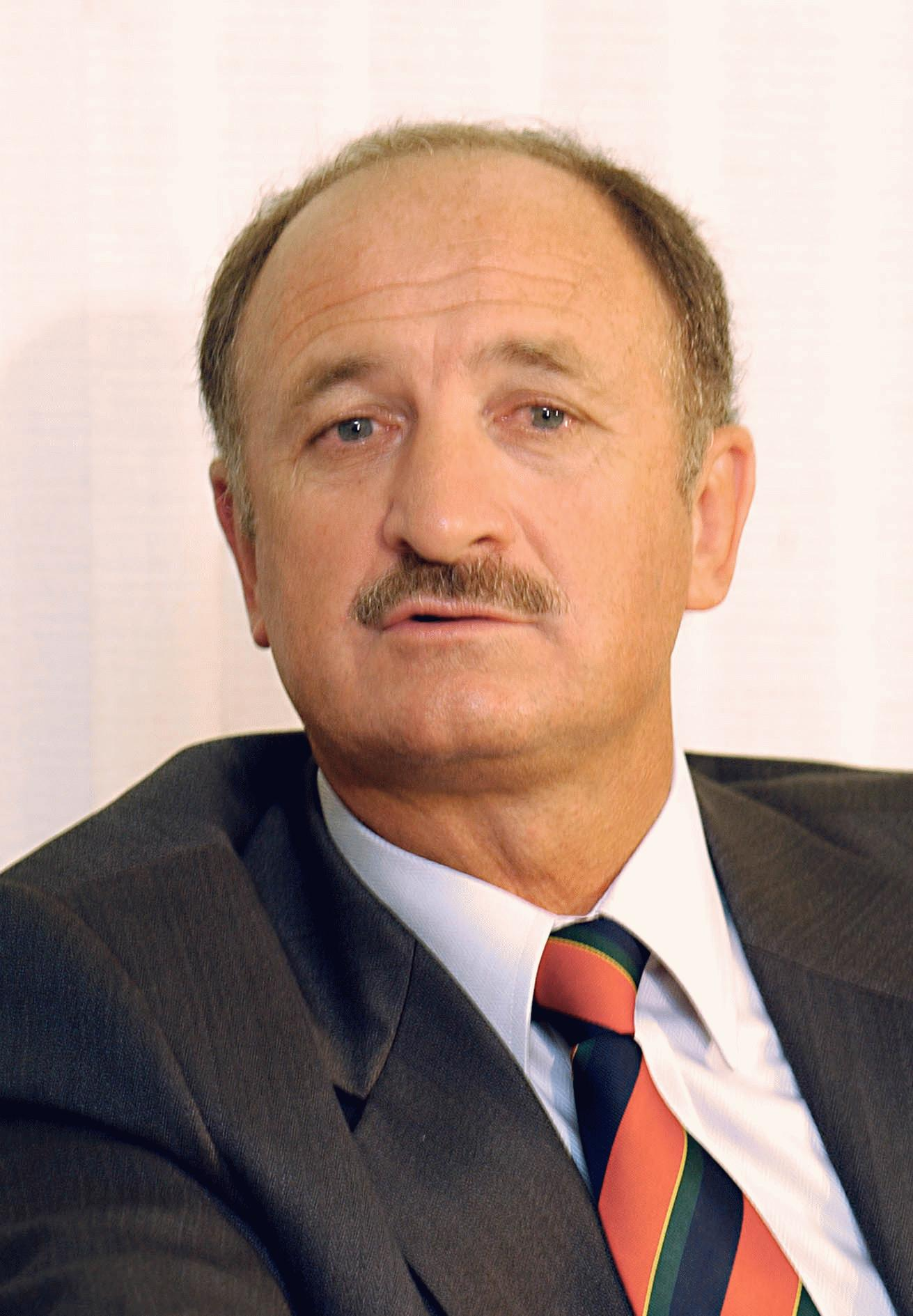
Luiz Felipe Scolari

=== 2000 – Four finals disputed ===
In 2000, Palmeiras disputed four finals. First, the team won the Rio-São Paulo Tournament after beating Vasco da Gama by 6–1 on aggregate in the final. In the first leg, in Rio de Janeiro, Palmeiras beat Vasco 2–1. In the second leg, at Morumbi Stadium, Palmeiras prevailed by a score of 4–0.

The club again reached the 2000 Copa Libertadores finals, this time against Boca Juniors from Argentina. In the first leg in Buenos Aires, the game ended 2–2. In the second leg, at the Morumbi in São Paulo, the game ended 0–0, with Boca winning the competition in a penalty shootout and preventing a consecutive championship for Palmeiras.

After the Copa Libertadores final, Luiz Felipe Scolari left Palmeiras, along with a number of players. Given the circumstances, Palmeiras invested in younger players and won the first ever Brazilian Champions' Cup after beating Sport Recife in the final. The result qualified the club to play in their 3rd consecutive Copa Libertadores in 2001.

At the end of the year, the club also reached the quarterfinals of the 2000 Campeonato Brasileiro playoffs and played their 3rd consecutive Copa Mercosur final, which was also their 5th consecutive CONMEBOL championship final since the second half of 1998 (1998 Copa Mercosur, 1999 Copa Libertadores, 1999 Copa Mercosur, 2000 Copa Libertadores, and the 2000 Copa Mercosur).

The young Palmeiras team eventually lost the 2000 Copa Mercosur final to a Vasco da Gama full of stars such as Romario, Juninho Paulista, and Euller. The team was called “bom e barato” (good and cheap) and their success triggered a new management philosophy in the club, which was eventually proven to not be as effective in subsequent years.

Having won key national and international competitions, Palmeiras was proclaimed Brazilian football's Best Team of the 20th Century of Brazil by the São Paulo State Football Federation (FPF), the Folha de São Paulo and Estado de São Paulo newspapers, and the Placar magazine.

=== 2000s – Difficult years ===
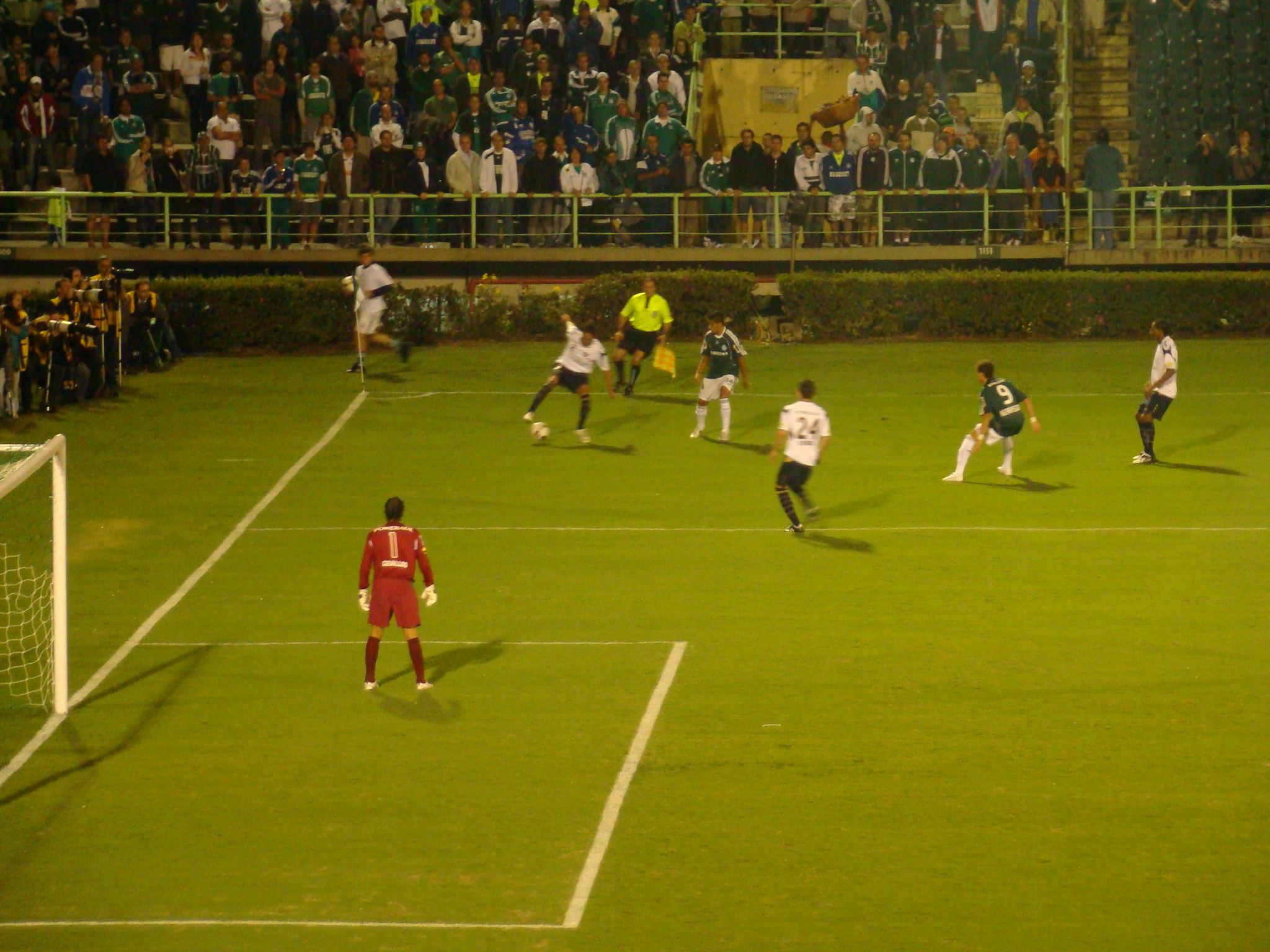
Palmeiras against Liga Deportiva Universitaria in 2009

Parmalat's sponsorship ended in 2000, leaving Palmeiras in dire straits. After reaching the 2001 Copa Libertadores semi-finals (where they lost to the Boca Juniors), the club had a bad 2002 season that ended in relegation to the Série B, but immediately returned in 2004.

The 2004 and 2005 seasons were rather successful, with the team finishing in 4th both years and qualifying for the Libertadores in 2005 and 2006. Palmeiras was eliminated by rivals São Paulo in the Round of 16 in both years.

In 2007, Edmundo played his last season for the club, just missing out on the top 4 in Série A in the final game of the season.

In 2008, Palmeiras arrived at a sponsorship agreement with Traffic, a sports marketing agency. The club made big investments on new players and Vanderlei Luxemburgo. This new strategy paid dividends as Palmeiras won their 22nd Paulista Championship, capped off with a 5–0 victory over Ponte Preta in the second leg of the final. Palmeiras finished 4th in the Campeonato Brasileiro, which qualified them for the 2009 edition of the Copa Libertadores.

=== Nubank Parque ===
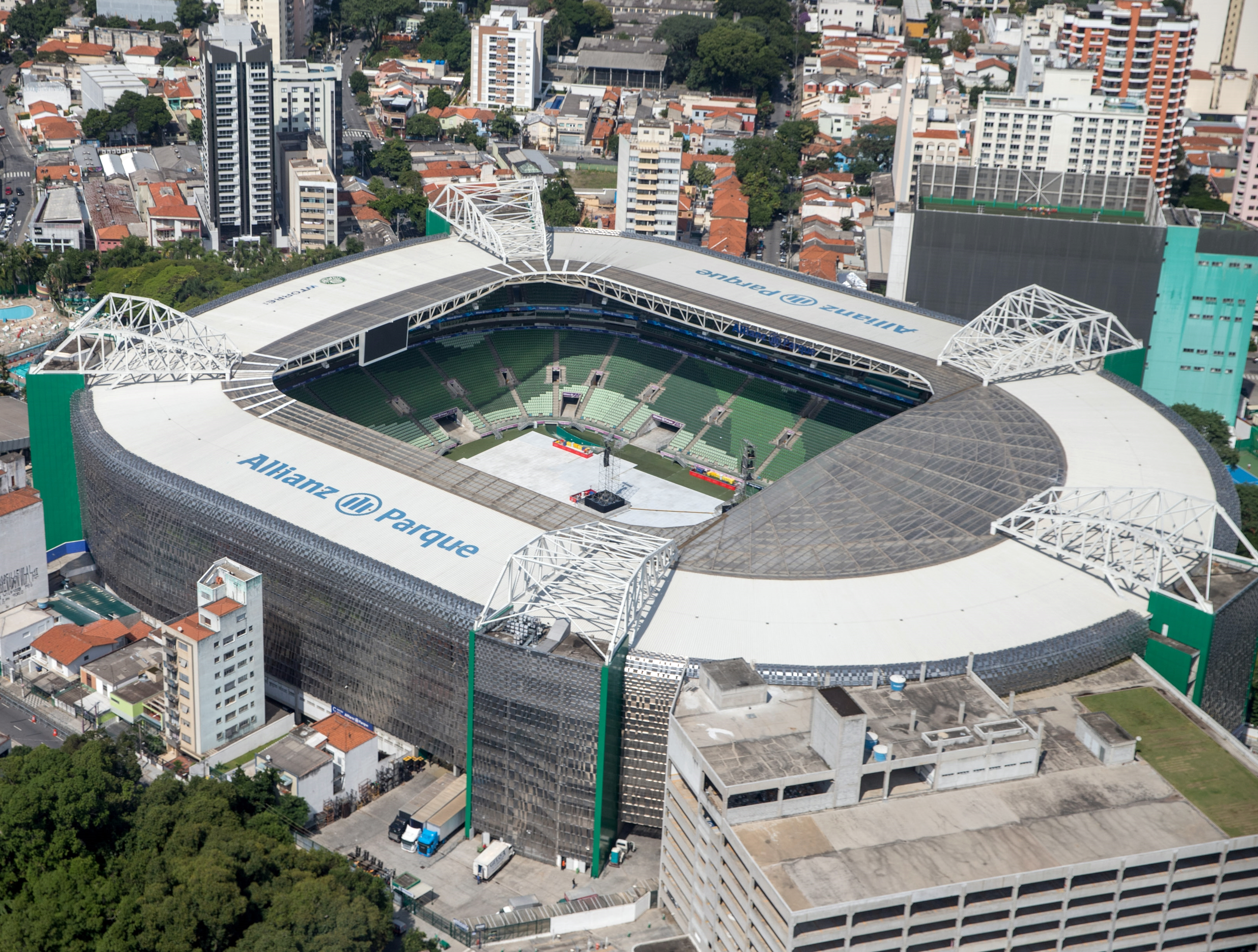
Nubank Parque

The year of 2008 also marked the beginning of the planning phase for a new stadium for the club, as well as remodeling the social club, to prepare Palmeiras for the club's centenary year in 2014. The planned arena is now known as Nubank Parque.

In 2009, the club reached the quarterfinals of Copa Libertadores, eventually losing to Uruguayan side Nacional on away goals. In the same season, Palmeiras came close to winning the Brazilian League, but political problems inside the club caused internal turmoil and affected on-field performances, and Palmeiras finished the season in fifth place.

From 2010 to 2014, Palmeiras played its home matches in the municipal Pacaembu, as the Estádio Palestra Itália was demolished.

=== 2012: Copa do Brasil and relegation ===
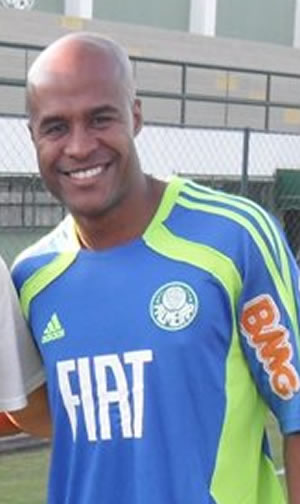
Marcos Assunção

In 2012, Palmeiras won the Copa do Brasil for the second time, beating Coritiba in the final. Led by manager Luiz Felipe Scolari and captained by midfielder Marcos Assunção, Palmeiras did not suffer a defeat in the entire tournament.

Less than three months after winning the Copa do Brasil, Scolari would leave the club due to poor performances in the league. He was replaced by Gilson Kleina, the manager of Ponte Preta, but the team failed to improve its performances and was relegated to the Campeonato Brasileiro Série B for the second time in its history after a draw against Flamengo on November 18, 2012.

=== 2013–2015: Beginning of a resurgence ===
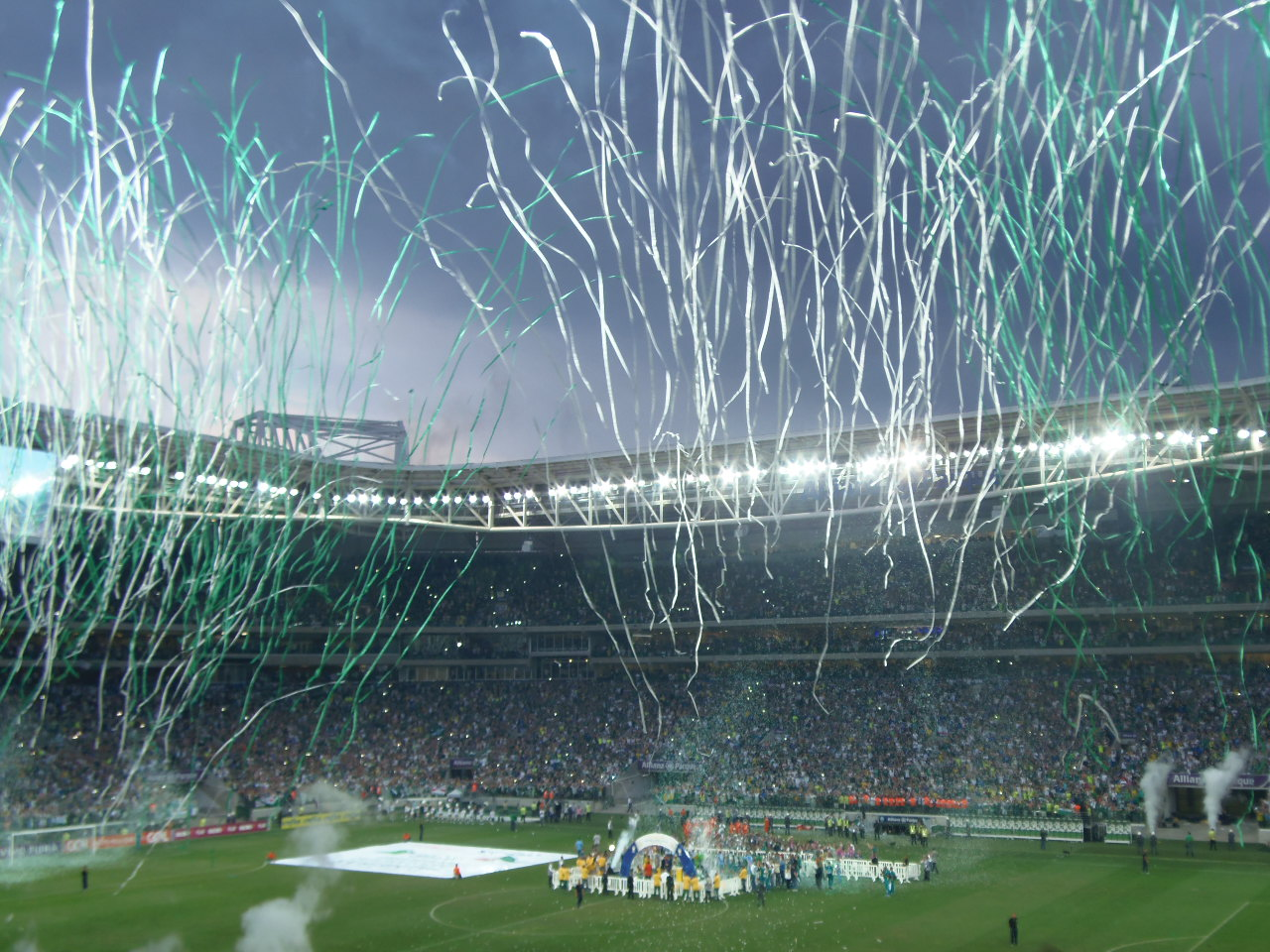
Palmeiras' supporters at Nubank Parque

In 2013, now under the administration of newly elected President Paulo Nobre, Palmeiras was easily promoted back to the first division with six games to spare, ensuring their participation in the 2014 Série A for the club's centennial season.

Palmeiras suffered a setback early on in its 2014 centennial season as head coach Kleina was sacked, swiftly followed by the departure of striker Alan Kardec and defender Henrique. Argentinian Ricardo Gareca was signed to coach the team after the break for the World Cup in Brazil, but failed to meet expectations and was sacked after a short spell. Dorival Júnior replaced Gareca until the end of the season, as the club was fighting against relegation. With first-choice goalkeeper Fernando Prass and midfielder Jorge Valdivia both returning from injury, the players led Palmeiras throughout the second half of the season as the club managed to avoid relegation and finished the season in 16th place.

==== Another Copa do Brasil ====
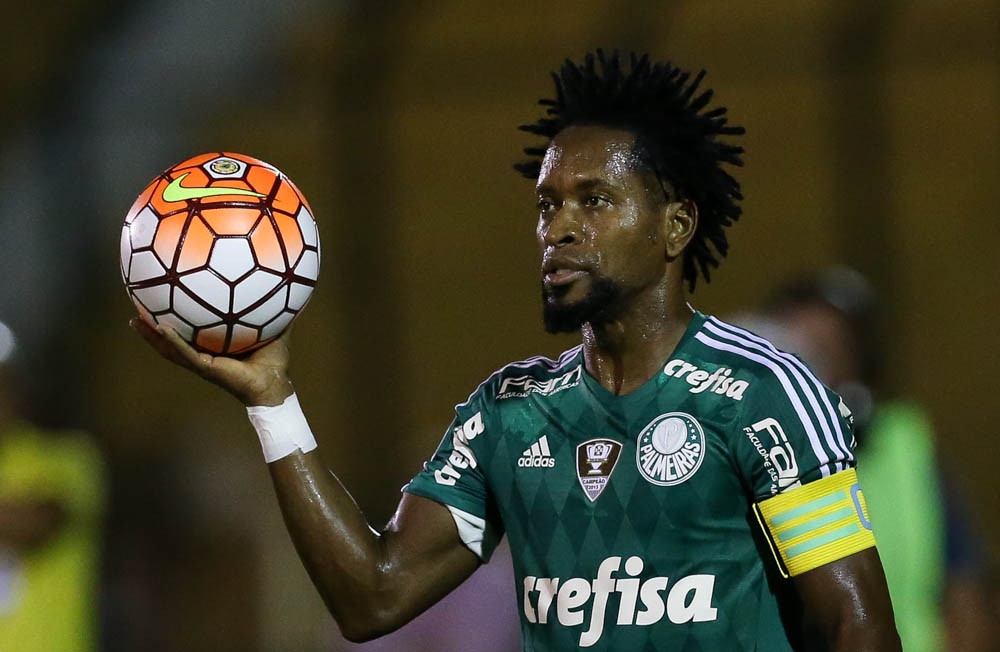
Zé Roberto

In 2015, Palmeiras underwent an extensive rebuilding project, hiring a new coach and new football director. The club signed 25 players over the year and promoted several new talents from the club's youth teams, while almost every player from the 2014 squad was moved on. Palmeiras also improved its official paid supporters program, Avanti, eventually reaching 114,000 paid supporters.

This was also Palmeiras' first season playing in their newly built stadium, the Nubank Parque, which seated 43,713 fans and included fully covered spectator seating; it was inaugurated on 19 November 2014.

Palmeiras reached the 2015 Campeonato Paulista finals, which they lost on penalties to rivals Santos FC.

On 9 June 2015, manager Oswaldo de Oliveira was sacked by Palmeiras due to a slow start to the Campeonato Brasileiro. On 10 June 2015, Palmeiras reached an agreement with Marcelo Oliveira, recently sacked by Cruzeiro despite having won the Brazilian league with them in 2013 and 2014.

Palmeiras won the 2015 Copa do Brasil on 2 December 2015. After a 1–0 loss to Santos in the first leg, the players were received at the stadium by more than 40,000 supporters both inside and outside Nubank Parque. Palmeiras won the second leg 2–1, with both goals scored by Dudu, before winning the trophy on penalties (with Fernando Prass saving a penalty and converting the winning penalty). Gabriel Jesus was the great revelation of that team, while the experience of midfielder Zé Roberto was also fundamental for Palmeiras to win the competition.

With this title, Palmeiras increased its supremacy as Brazil's greatest champion, with 12 national titles (8 league titles, 1 Brazilian Champions Cup and 3 Copa do Brasil titles). As champions of the 2015 Copa do Brasil, Palmeiras also secured a place in the 2016 Copa Libertadores group stage.

=== 2016–2018: Back on top of Brazilian football ===
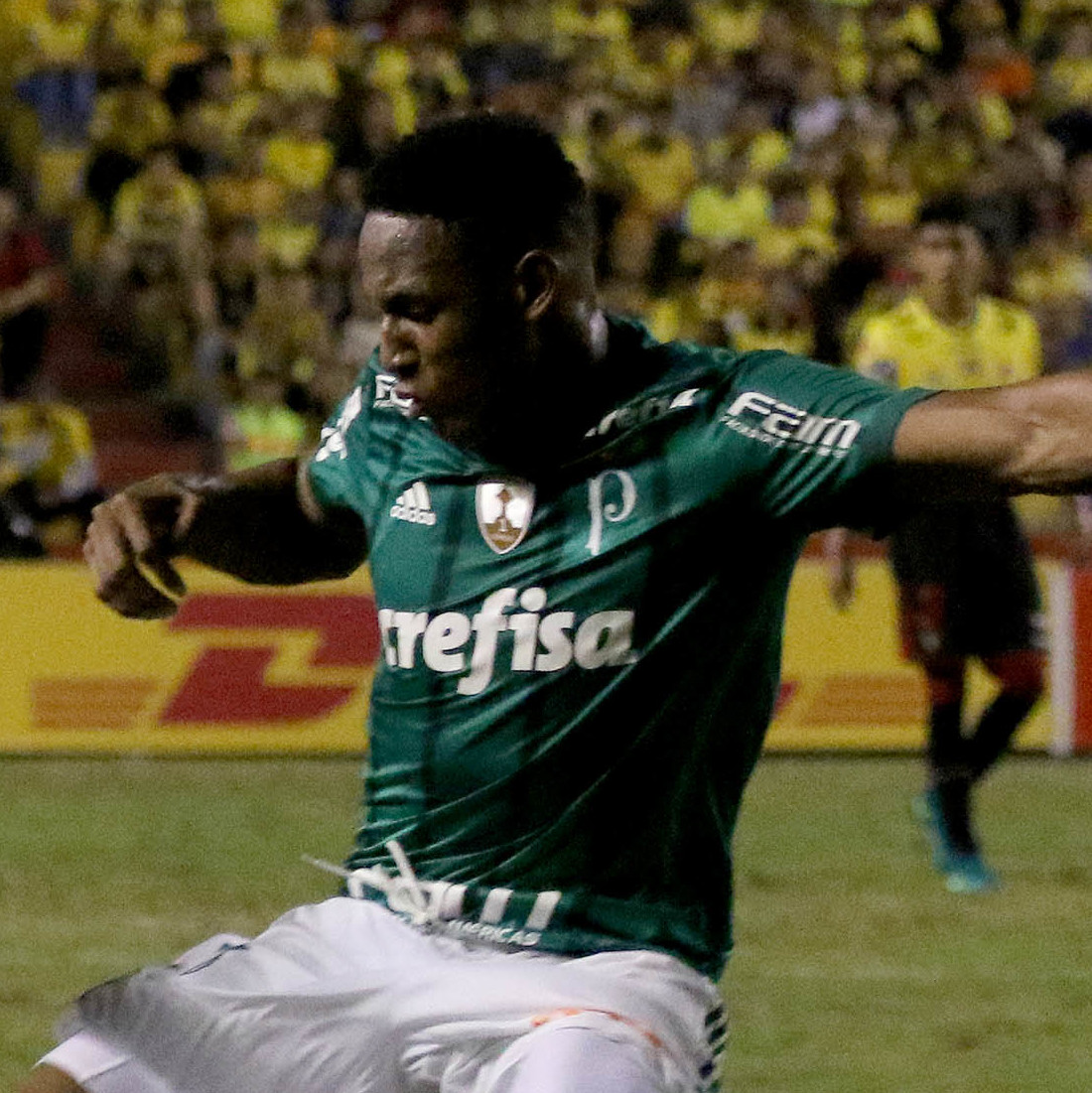
Yerry Mina

On 12 March 2016, Palmeiras reached a verbal agreement with Cuca to become its new manager. Palmeiras re-signed Zé Roberto, while also signing other key players for the 2016 season, including Dudu, Edu Dracena, Moisés, Róger Guedes, Jean, Yerry Mina, and Tchê Tchê.

==== 2016: 9th national title ====
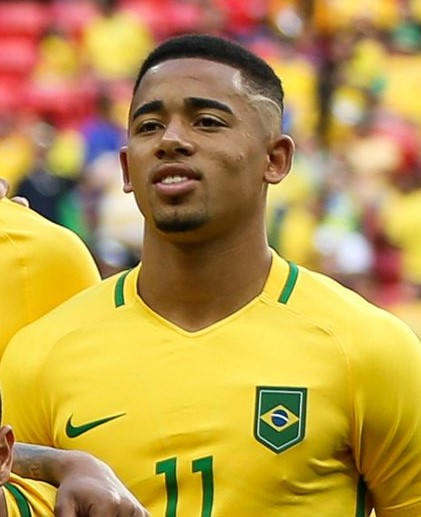
Gabriel Jesus

After a dominant year, leading the league for 29 weeks, Cuca led Palmeiras to their ninth league title, and first in 22 years, making it the club with the most league titles in Brazil. Gabriel Jesus was the team's leading scorer with 12 goals. On 27 November 2016, Palmeiras was guaranteed the title before the 38th week, beating Chapecoense at home 1–0 with a goal from Fabiano in the 26th minute. With an attendance of 40,986 supporters, this broke the old record attendance of 40,035 from 12 July 2016 against Santos.

==== 2018: 10th national title ====
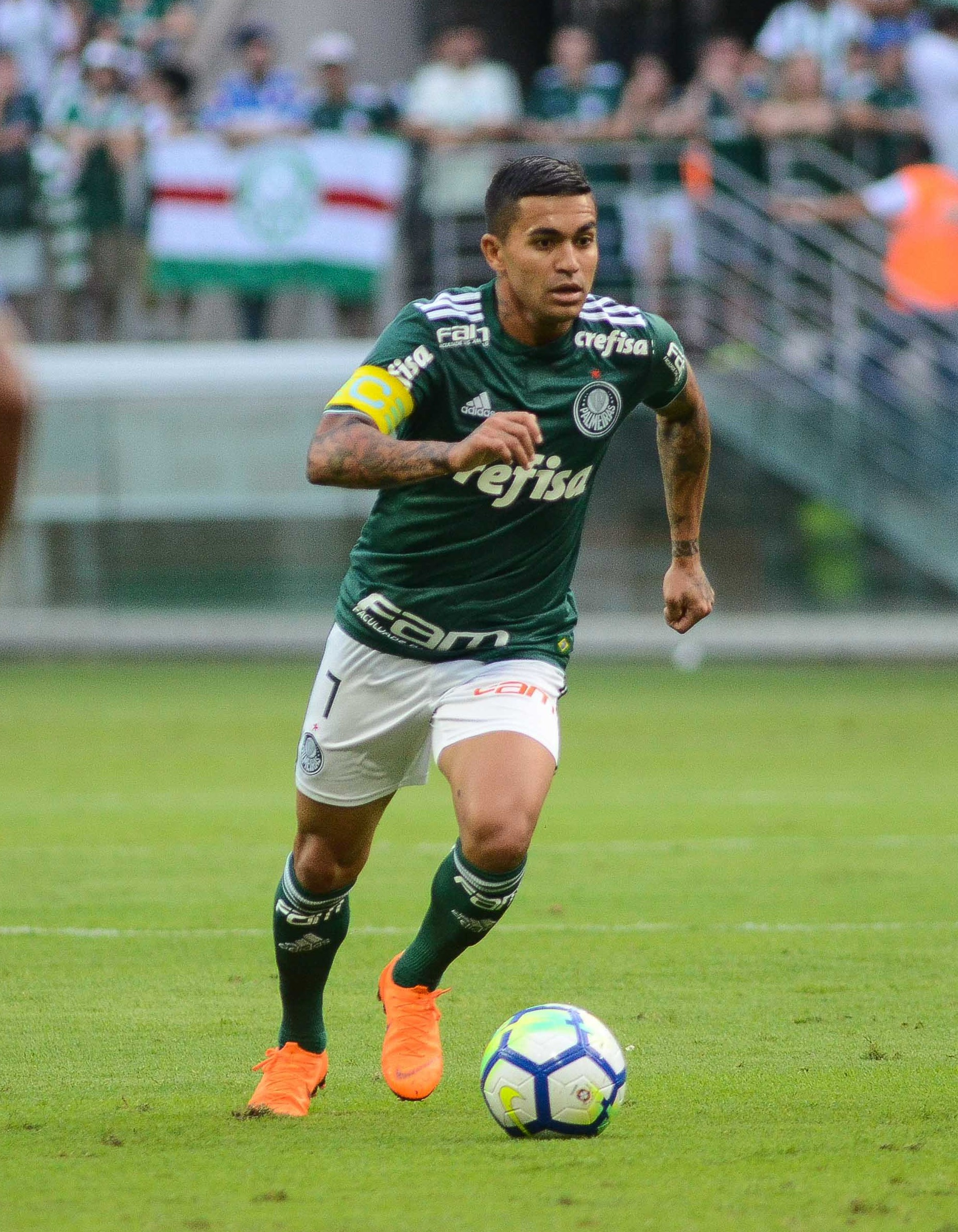
Dudu in 2018

On 25 November 2018, Palmeiras clinched its 10th Campeonato Brasileiro title after defeating Vasco 1–0 in Rio de Janeiro. On 2 December 2018, Palmeiras played their last game of the season in front of a record-breaking crowd of 41,216. With a 3–2 win over Vitória, Palmeiras set a new Campeonato Brasileiro record for the longest undefeated streak (23 matches).

=== 2020: Treble ===
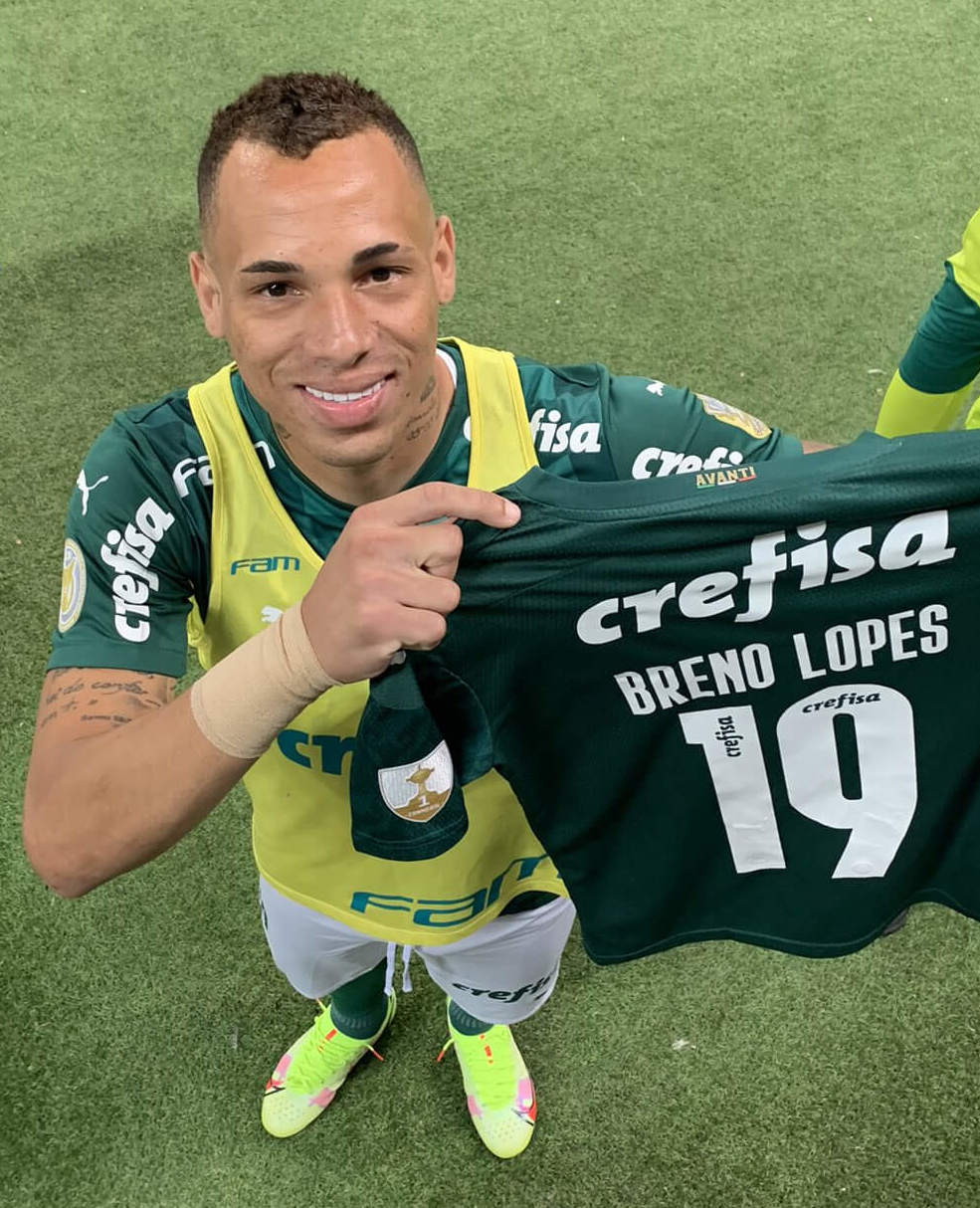
Breno Lopes

In 2020, during the COVID-19 pandemic, Palmeiras beat archrival Corinthians in a historic final of the Campeonato Paulista. In the first final in the history of the competition without any spectators, Palmeiras won after beating Corinthians in a penalty shootout.

On 30 January 2021, Palmeiras, led by Portuguese coach Abel Ferreira, won the 2020 Copa Libertadores against Santos by a score of 1–0 at the Maracanã, in Rio de Janeiro. It was Palmeiras' second title in the competition. Breno Lopes scored the only goal of the match nine minutes into second-half stoppage time.

As champions, Palmeiras qualified for the 2020 FIFA Club World Cup in Qatar and earned the right to play against the winners of the 2020 Copa Sudamericana in the 2021 Recopa Sudamericana.

In March 2021, Palmeiras won the 2020 Copa do Brasil, defeating Grêmio with an overall score of 3–0. It was the 4th Copa do Brasil title for Palmeiras.

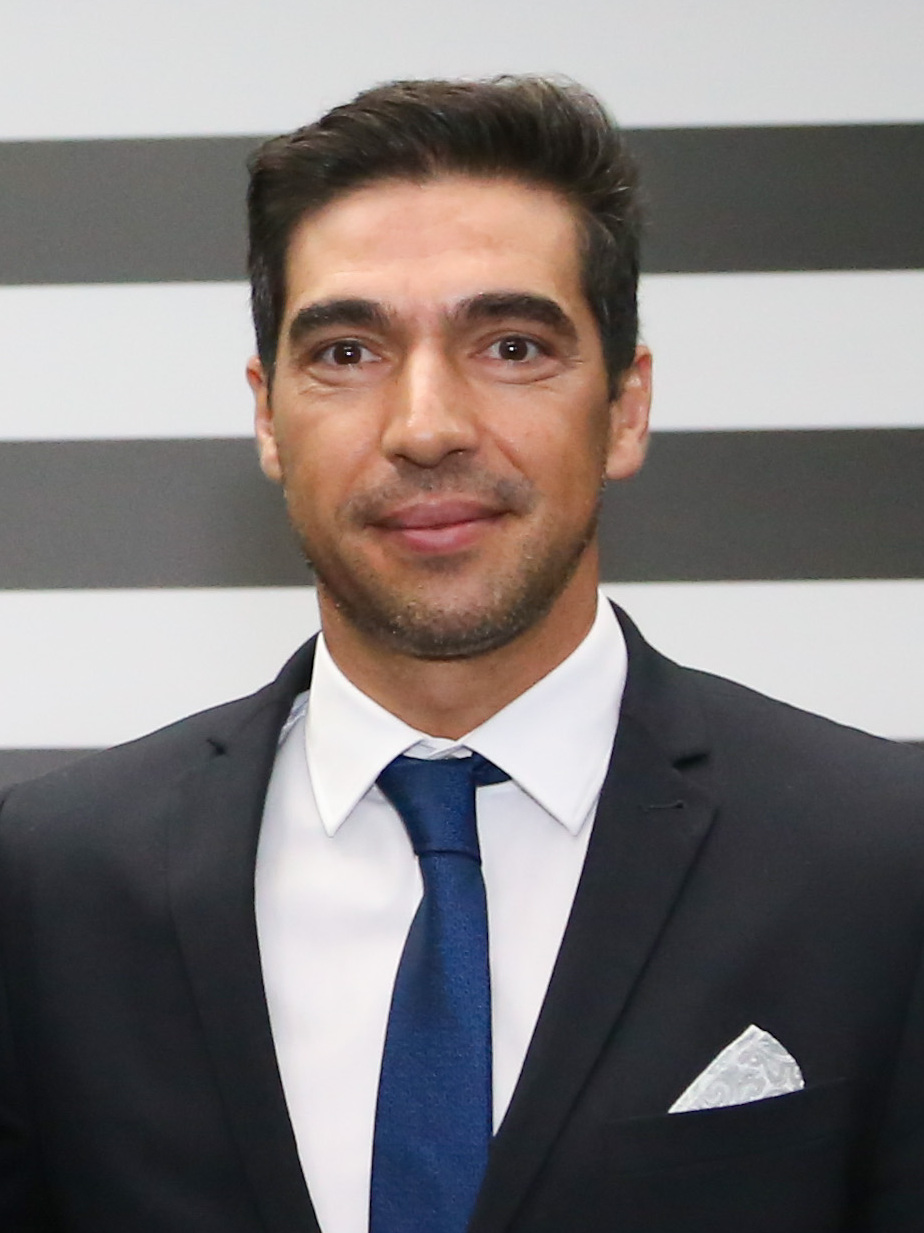
Abel Ferreira

=== 2021: Defending the Libertadores ===
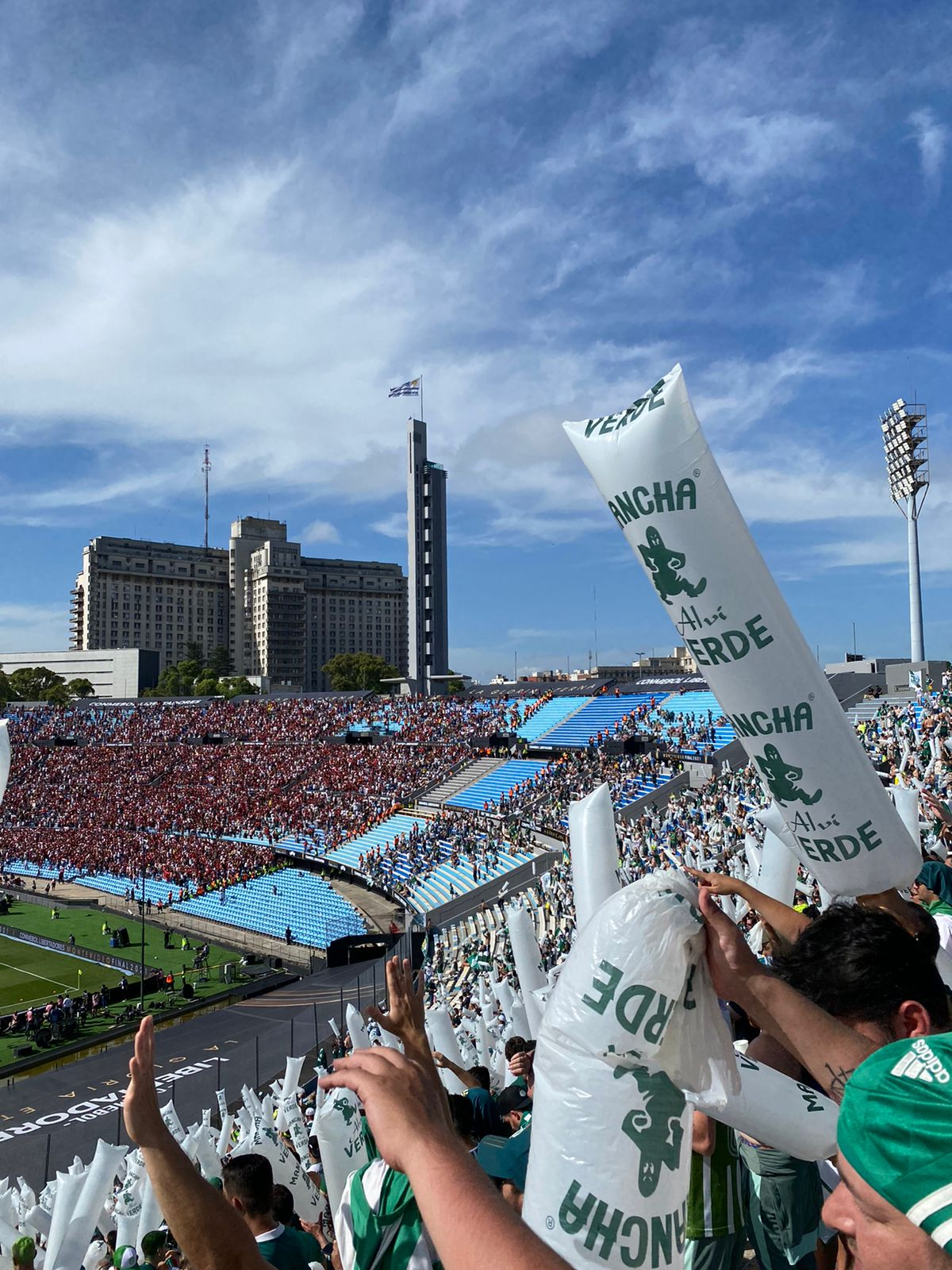
Palmeiras' supporters at Estadio Centenario

On 27 November 2021, Palmeiras won the 2021 Copa Libertadores against Flamengo, with a score of 2–1, in a single match in a decisive confrontation held at Estadio Centenario, in Montevideo, Uruguay. Once again led by the Portuguese coach Abel Ferreira, Palmeiras managed to win the second consecutive title in less than a year – the first time they ever achieved such feat in their history.

Raphael Veiga and Deyverson scored for the Verdão five minutes into the first half and into extra time respectively. Gabriel Barbosa scored the only goal for Flamengo at 72 minutes.

As champions, Palmeiras qualified for the 2021 FIFA Club World Cup in the United Arab Emirates, and earned the right to play against the winners of the 2021 Copa Sudamericana in the 2022 Recopa Sudamericana.

On 20 January 2022 the International Federation of Football History & Statistics announced Palmeiras as the winner of the Men's World Best Club Ranking of 2021. It was the first time a Brazilian club finished a year on top of this ranking.

=== 2022: Setting new records ===
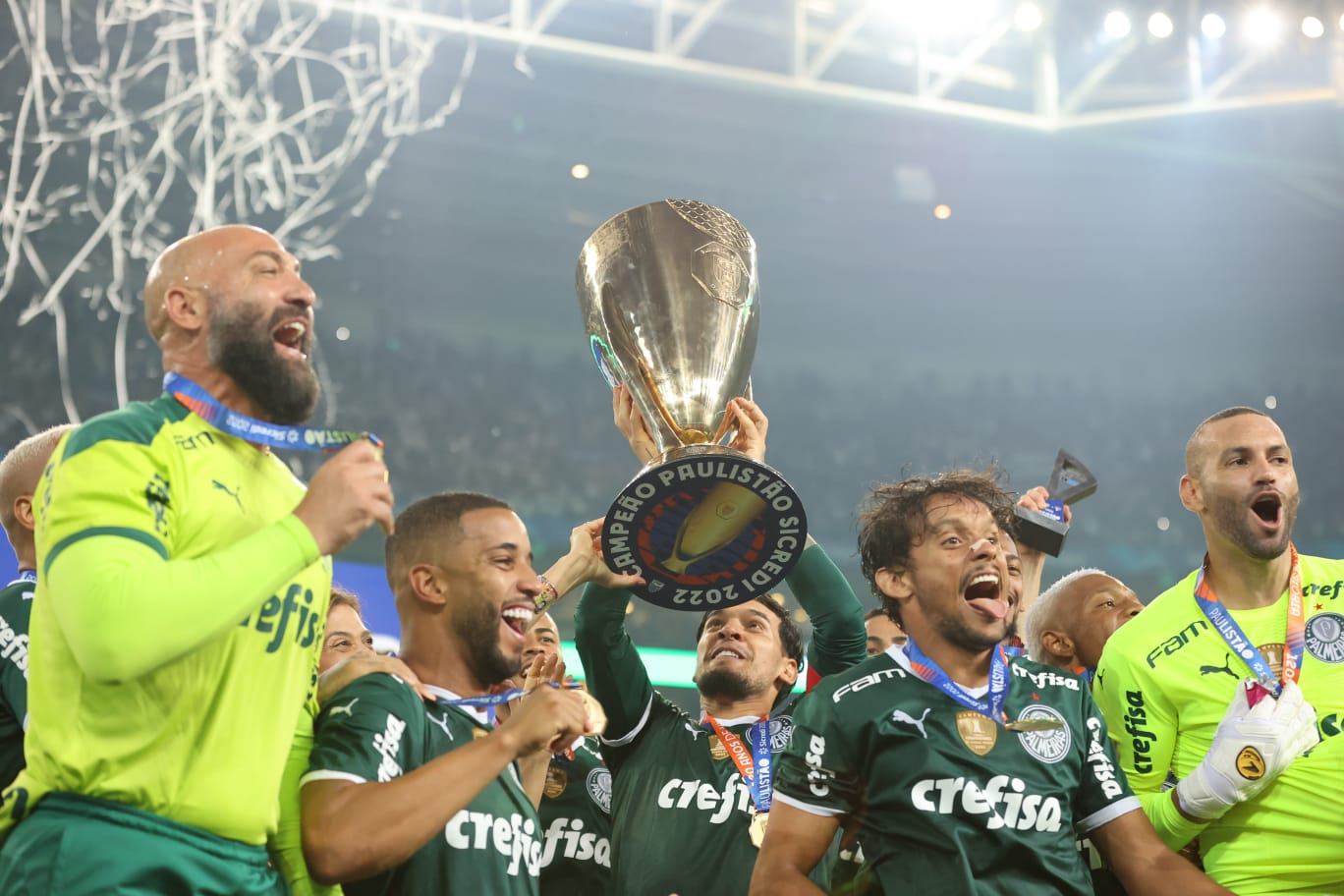
The Palmeiras squad with the Campeonato Paulista trophy

In January 2022, Palmeiras' under-20s won the Copa São Paulo de Futebol Júnior for the first time, defeating rival Santos FC 4–0 in the final. This victory brought home the only major youth trophy that had yet to be won by Palmeiras, and served as the culmination of a sustained period of investment in the youth teams, beginning in 2013.

In February 2022, Palmeiras played the 2021 FIFA Club World Cup and finished in the second place after beating Al-Ahly in the semifinals, and losing the final match 2–1 in extra time against Chelsea after a penalty confirmed by the video assistance referee.

In March 2022, Palmeiras defeated Athletico Paranaense by 4–2 on aggregate and won the 2022 Recopa Sudamericana.

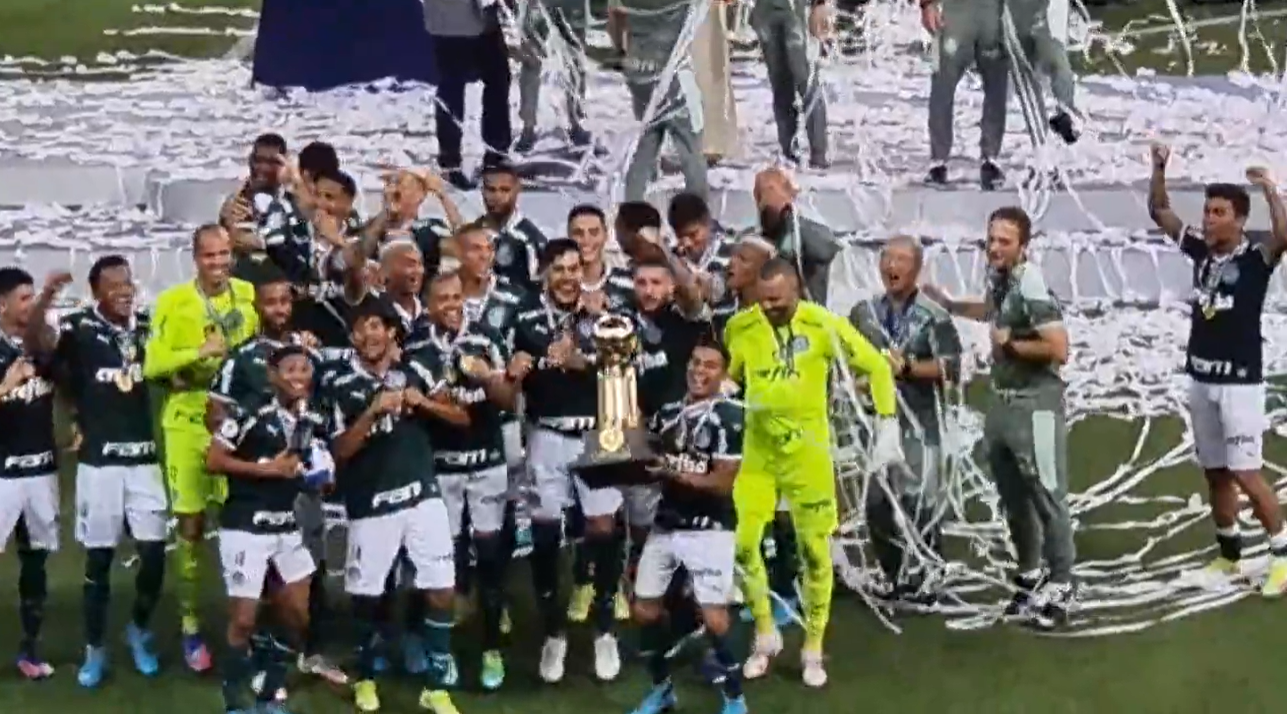
The Palmeiras squad with the Recopa trophy

In April 2022, Palmeiras won their 24th Campeonato Paulista after beating Sao Paulo FC in the Finals by 5–3 on aggregate, coming back from a 3–1 loss in the first leg.

In November 2022, Palmeiras won their 11th Campeonato Brasileiro after a solid season, having lost only three games. The trophy was the remaining possible trophy to be won by Abel Ferreira in South America.

=== 2023: Another victorious season ===
In January 2023, Palmeiras won the Copa São Paulo de Futebol Júnior for the second time in a row, defeating América Mineiro 2–1 in the final. The Verdão then added the 2023 Supercopa do Brasil to their trophy cabinet on 28 January 2023 after scoring 4–3 against Clube de Regatas Flamengo. The match was played at Mane Garrincha Stadium in Brasília.

As they did the season before they reached the Campeonato Paulista finals without a single loss, however, Palmeiras lost the first leg of the final by a 2–1 scoreline against Esporte Clube Água Santa, but proceeded to win the second leg 4–0 as they had done the year before to win their 25th, and second consecutive Campeonato Paulista title.

In the Copa Libertadores, Palmeiras entered directly into the group stage and was drawn into Group C alongside Barcelona from Guayaquil, Ecuador, Bolívar from Bolivia, and Cerro Porteño from Paraguay, having the best campaign in the group stage. In the round of 16, eliminated Atlético-MG after winning the first leg away at Mineirão 1-0 and drawing 0–0 at home at Nubank Parque. In the quarterfinals, they faced Deportivo Pereira from Colombia. Palmeiras won the first leg at Estádio Hernán Ramírez Villegas with a 4–0 victory and drew 0–0 in the second leg at home. In the semifinals, they were defeated by Argentine side Boca Juniors after drawing both matches and losing in the penalty shootout.

In the Copa do Brasil, Palmeiras entered in the third round, where they faced Tombense by draw and won 5–3 on aggregate. They defeated Fortaleza 3–1 on aggregate in the round of 16 but were eliminated in the quarterfinals by their rival São Paulo with a 1-3 aggregate score.

In the Campeonato Brasileiro, with young Endrick standing out as the main highlight Palmeiras debuted at home against Cuiabá. They frequently held the second place in the tournament standings but reached the top of the table in the 34th round and maintained their position until the end of the competition. They clinched their 12th Brazilian title by drawing with Cruzeiro in the final round, further solidifying their status as the most successful national champion and repeating their achievement from 1994 when they last secured consecutive championships.

=== Current season (2024) ===
Palmeiras' season started on 4 February 2024, with the Supercopa do Brasil, where they faced their local rivals São Paulo. The match ended in a 0–0 draw, and São Paulo won 4–2 on penalties to claim their first title in the tournament.

In the Campeonato Paulista, Palmeiras was placed in Group B. Palmeiras remained unbeaten until the first leg of the finals, where they lost 1–0 to Santos. In the second leg at their home stadium, Nubank Parque, Palmeiras defeated Santos 2–0, securing their 26th title.

Palmeiras got knocked out of the Copa Libertadores in the Round Of 16 competition phase. They faced Botafogo as their opponents, they lost 2–1 in the first leg at the Estadio Olimpico Nilton Santos. In the second leg, they conceded two more goals but scored 3, the last one being a last-minute goal that was disallowed because of the video assistant referee. The score ended 4–3 on aggregate.

== Stadium ==
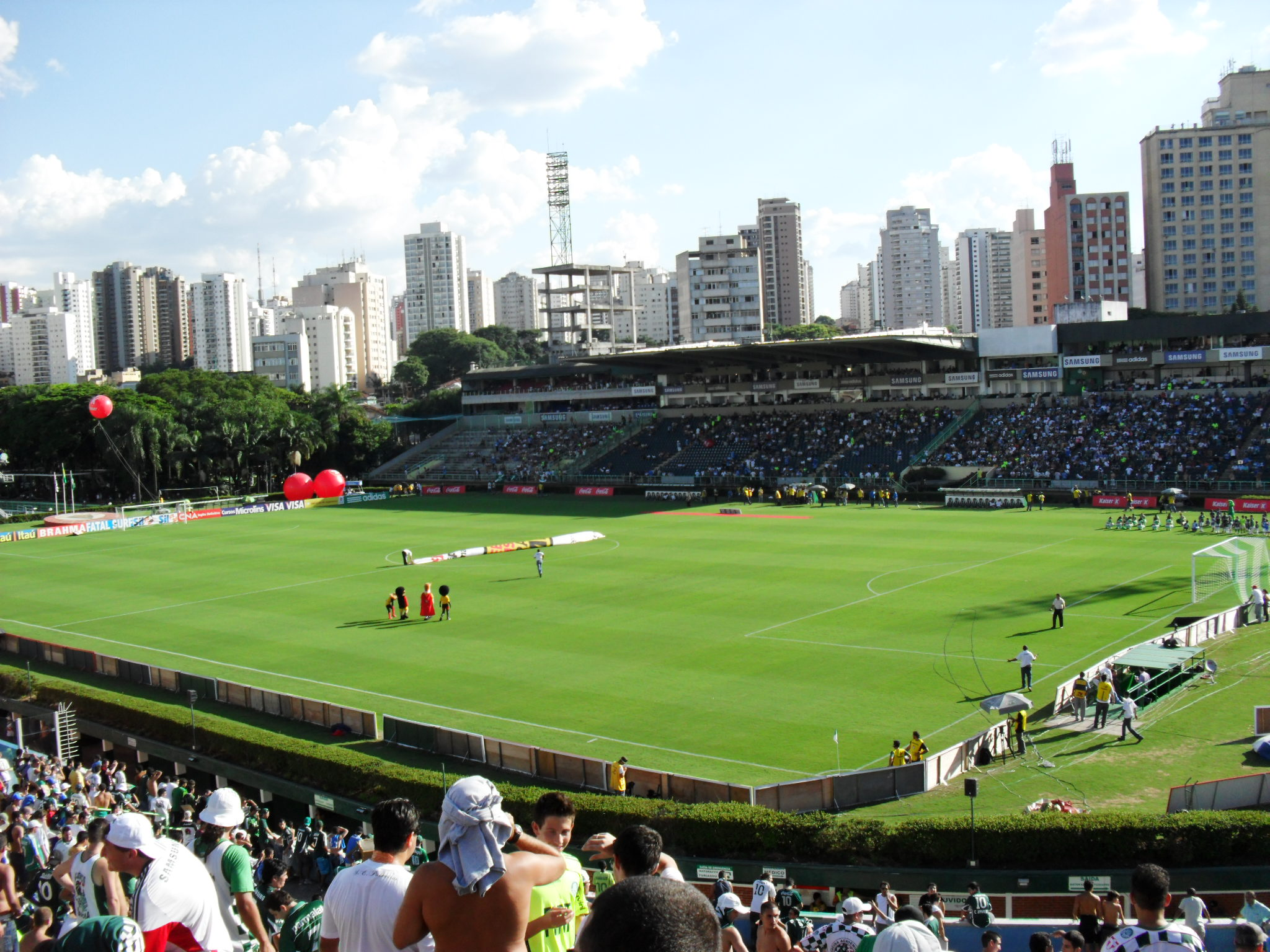
The old Estádio Palestra Itália

=== Estádio Palestra Itália (1917–2010) ===
The Estádio Palestra Itália was home of Palmeiras from 1917 to 2010. The venue was also known as Parque Antártica because the area was a park built by the Antarctica Paulista Brewing Company in the beginning of the last century, before being acquired by Palmeiras in 1920. In the past its capacity was listed as 35,000 spectators. However, even though its grandstands were extended in the late 1990s, it held only seats 27,640 people due to regulations which enforce safety and comfort.

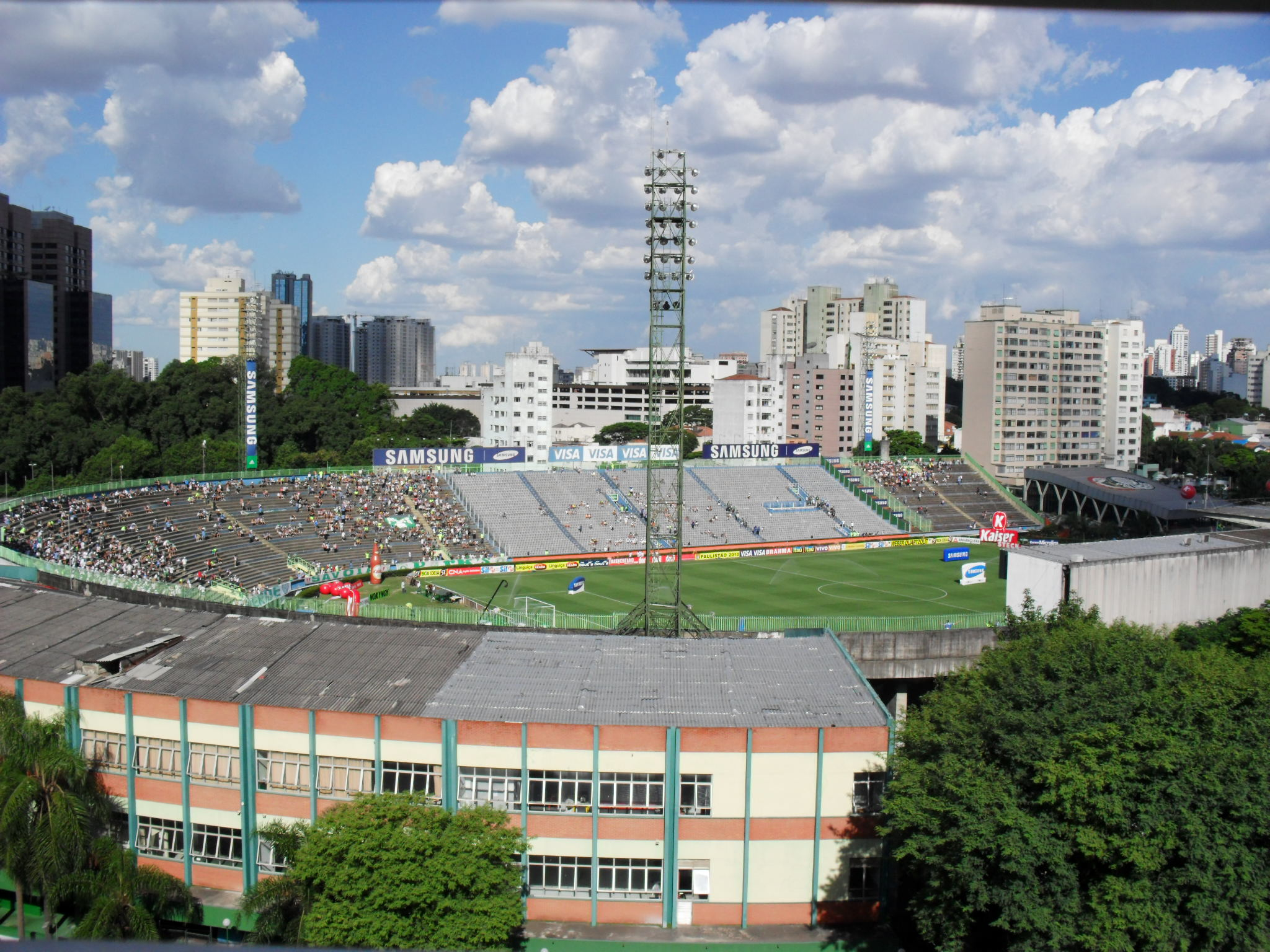
Estádio Palestra Itália in 2010

It was one of the most important Brazilian grounds, considering the amount of decisive and important matches played there. Examples of matches played in Palestra Itália include 1999 Copa Libertadores final, the Copa Mercosur finals of 1998, 1999 and 2000, 1996 Copa do Brasil final and several Campeonato Paulista finals.

The last official match played in the stadium was against Grêmio for the Série A on 22 May 2010, and the last match played was a friendly against Boca Juniors on 9 July 2010.

=== Allianz Parque (2014–present) ===
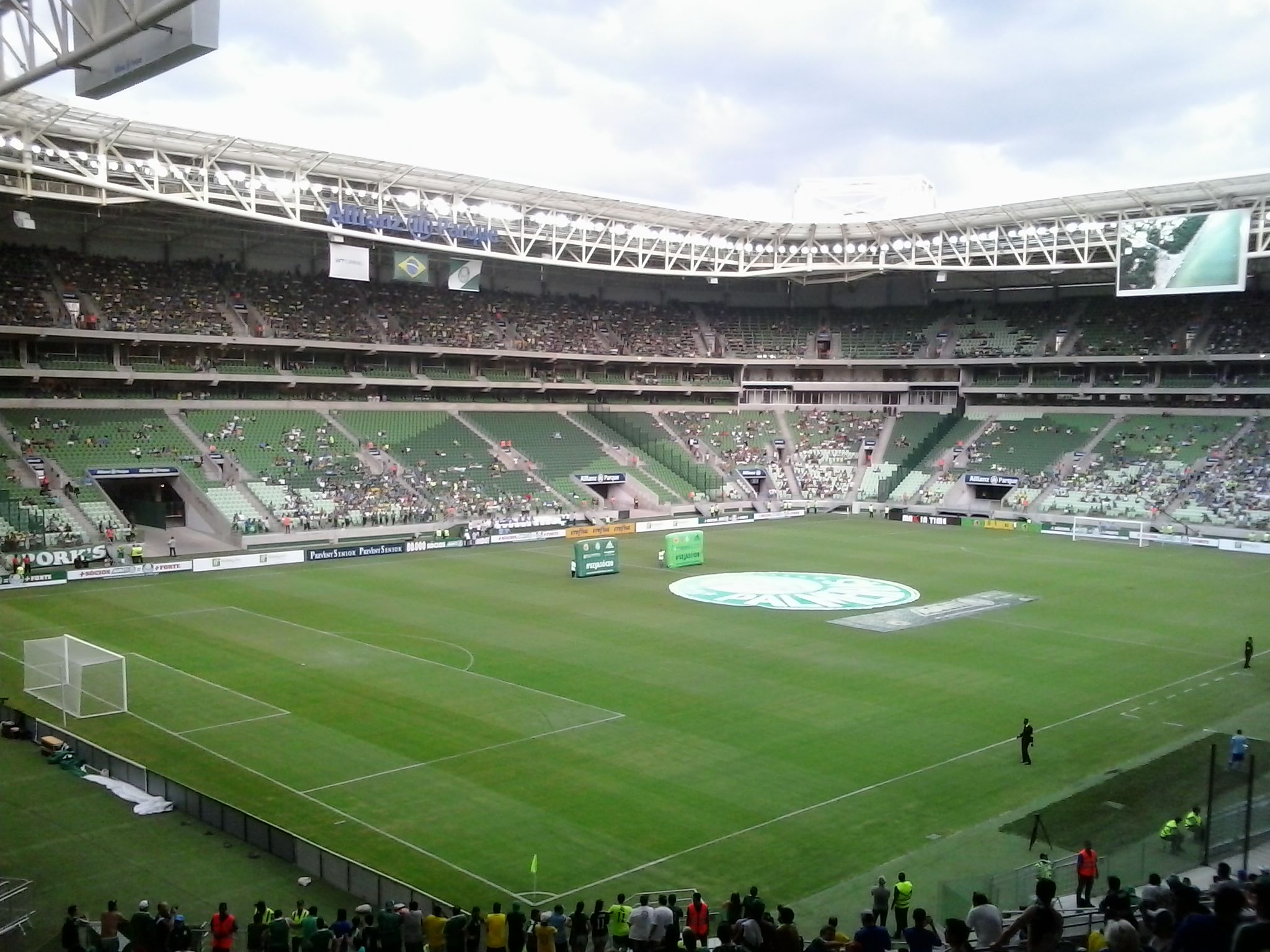
The new Allianz Parque

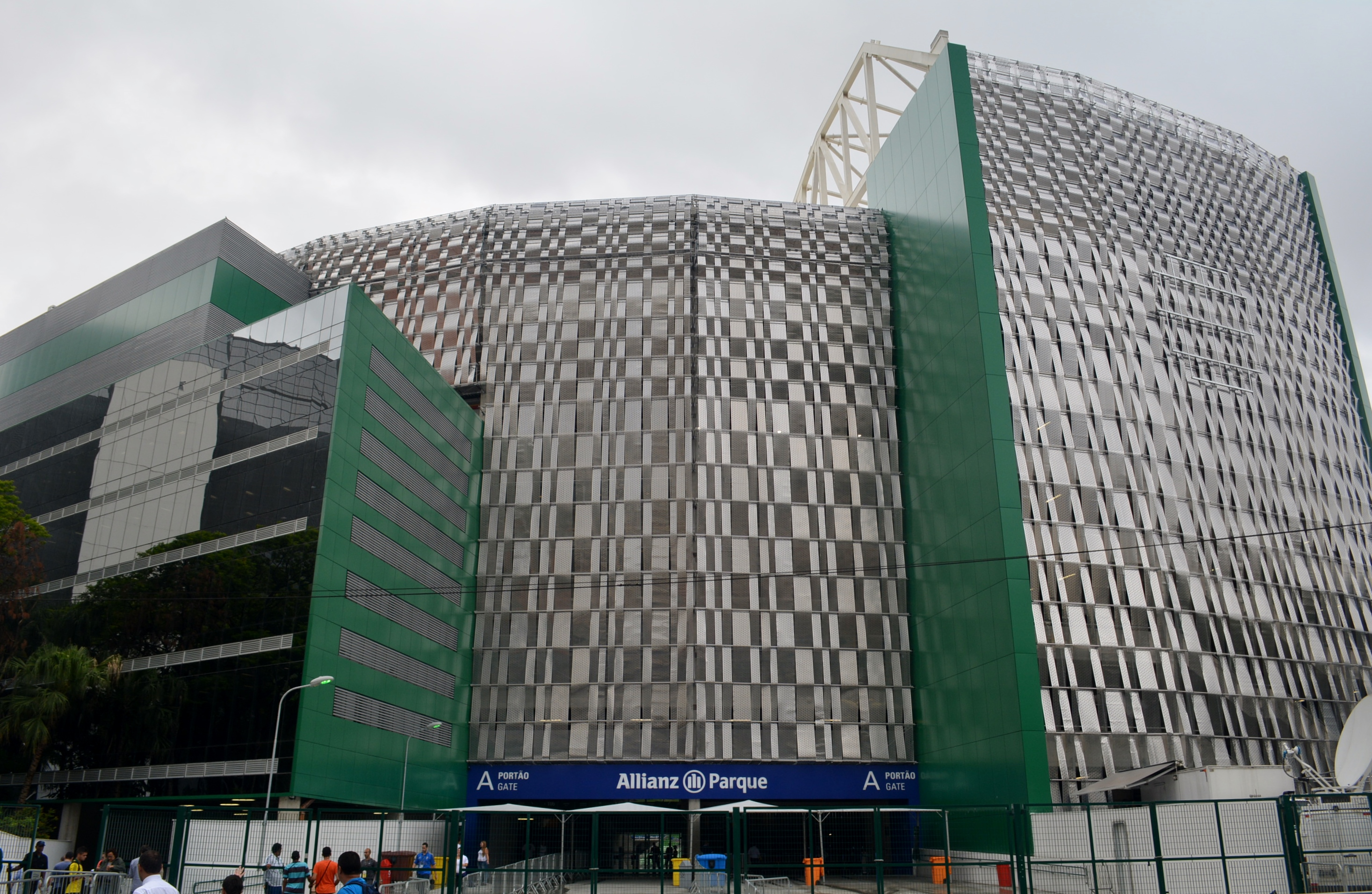
External view

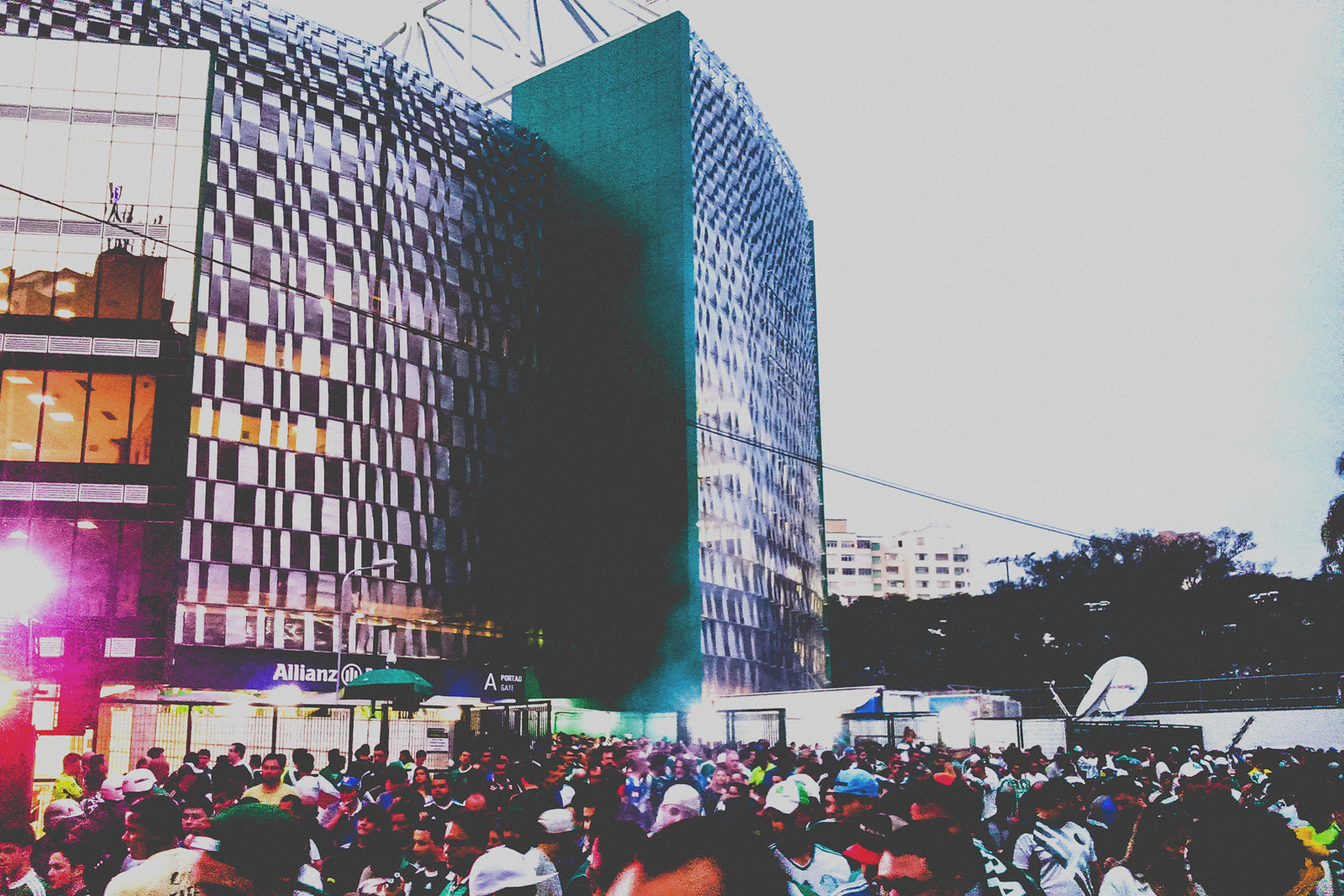
External view

Opened in November 2014, the Allianz Parque has 43,713 covered seats, being 25,395 lower seats, 14,888 upper seats and 3,430 in the cabins. The stadium was built for multipurpose events. Many other facilities are in place, including an enhanced parking area, a VIP area, a media center for up to 1,000 media members, 3 restaurants and bars and a heliport. The first official game at Allianz Parque was held on 19 November 2014, between Palmeiras and Sport in the Brazilian Série A, when hosts Palmeiras lost to Sport Recife 0–2. The first official goal of the stadium was scored by Ananias.

On 14 June 2015, Palmeiras won their first Brasileirão match in Allianz Parque with a 2–1 win over Fluminense.

== Kit ==
Palmeiras' first kit consisted of green jerseys, white shorts and green socks. Palmeiras' first jersey was blue jersey tribute to Italian National team. After that, a green with a horizontal white band, and a white with a red Savoy cross as the crest. Palmeiras have played in blue shirts many times as a tribute to the Italian National Team. Their supporters are also well known for creating the mancha verde (green stain) of fog and smoke when Palmeiras is entering the pitch.

From 2007 to 2009, Palmeiras used a third jersey: a light yellow shirt with dark green shorts and socks, produced by Adidas.

In 2010 Palmeiras the light yellow jersey became the second jersey, and started using a blue and white shirt, with white shorts, for their third jersey.

In 2016, Palmeiras announced the extension of the sponsorship agreement with Crefisa and FAM (Faculdade das Américas), which have exclusivity in the uniform of Palmeiras. The two companies, which are part of the same group controlled by the couple José Roberto Lamacchia and Leila Pereira, paid Palmeiras around R$78 million ($20 million) a year, the highest amount ever deposited by a partner in the history of Palmeiras. Palmeiras' uniform is among the most valuable uniforms in South America since 2016.

=== Manufacturer and sponsors ===
Crefisa, a Brazilian bank, announced it would sponsor Palmeiras for the 2015 season. After their success in the 2016 Campeonato Brasileiro, Crefisa announced it would increase fundings to R$90 million.

Period	Kit manufacturer	Shirt partner
1977–1986	Adidas	None
1987–1988	Adidas	Agip
1989–1992	Adidas	Coca-Cola
1993–1995	Rhumell	Parmalat
1996–1999	Reebok	Parmalat
1999–2000	Rhumell	Parmalat
2001–2002	Rhumell	Pirelli
2002–2005	Diadora	Pirelli
2006–2007	Adidas	Pirelli
2008	Adidas	FIAT
2009–2010	Adidas	Samsung
2010–2012	Adidas	FIAT
2012–2013	Adidas	KIA
2013–2014	Adidas	None
2015–2018	Adidas	Crefisa
2019–2024	Puma	Crefisa
2025-2026	Puma	Sportingbet
2026-present	Puma	None

=== Kit deals ===
Kit Supplier	Period	Contract announcement	Contract duration	Value
Adidas	January 2006–December 2018	2005-09-13	2006–2008 (first period) 2009–2011 (second period) 2012–2014 (third period) 2015–2016 (fourth period) 2017–2018 (fifth period)	$1.5 million per year (2006–2008) $4.0 million per year (2009–2011) $5.6 million per year (2012–2014) $5.7 million per year (2015–2016) $6.2 million per year (2017–2018)
Puma	2019–present	2018-03-23	1 January 2019 – 31 December 2021 (3 years) 1 January 2022 – 31 December 2024 (3 years)	$7.5 million per year

== Supporters ==
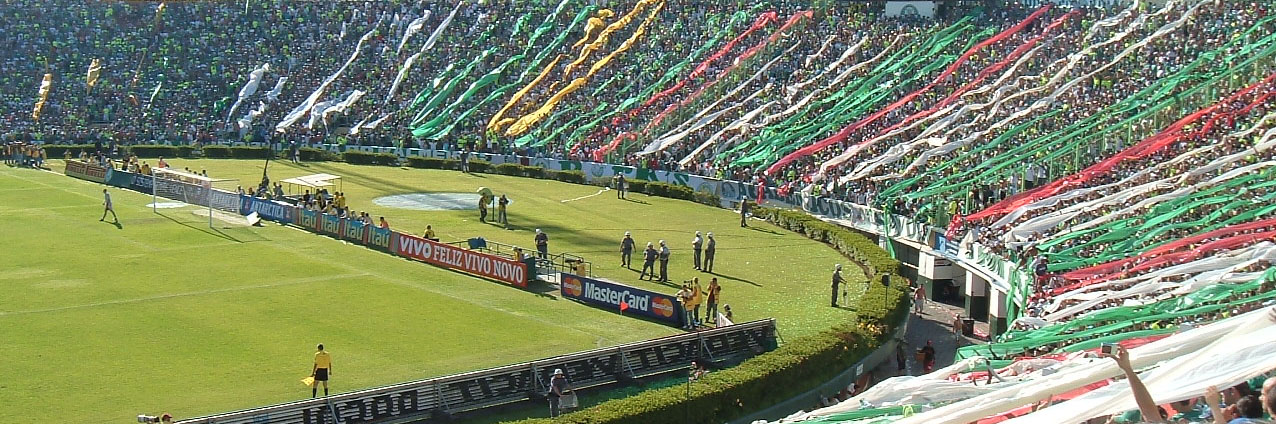
Palmeiras' supporters in the Estádio Palestra Itália

Originally, Palmeiras was a club heavily supported by Brazilians of Italian descent in São Paulo State. Over time, that distinction has reduced, and today the fan base is very diverse.

Palmeiras' largest supporters group are the Mancha Alvi-Verde (White and Green Stain, a green version of Phantom Blot), TUP (the oldest group), Acadêmicos da Savóia (the newest group), among others. There are big concentrations of Palmeiras fans across Brazil and in some places across the world known as “consulados” (consulates).

According to the famous Brazilian journalist and Palmeiras fan Joelmir Beting, who was a huge fan of the club, “it is unnecessary to explain the emotion of supporting Palmeiras to its fans, and impossible to do it to the non-fans”. This became one of the club's mottos and reflected in the walls of Allianz Parque's home dressing room.

== Rivalries ==
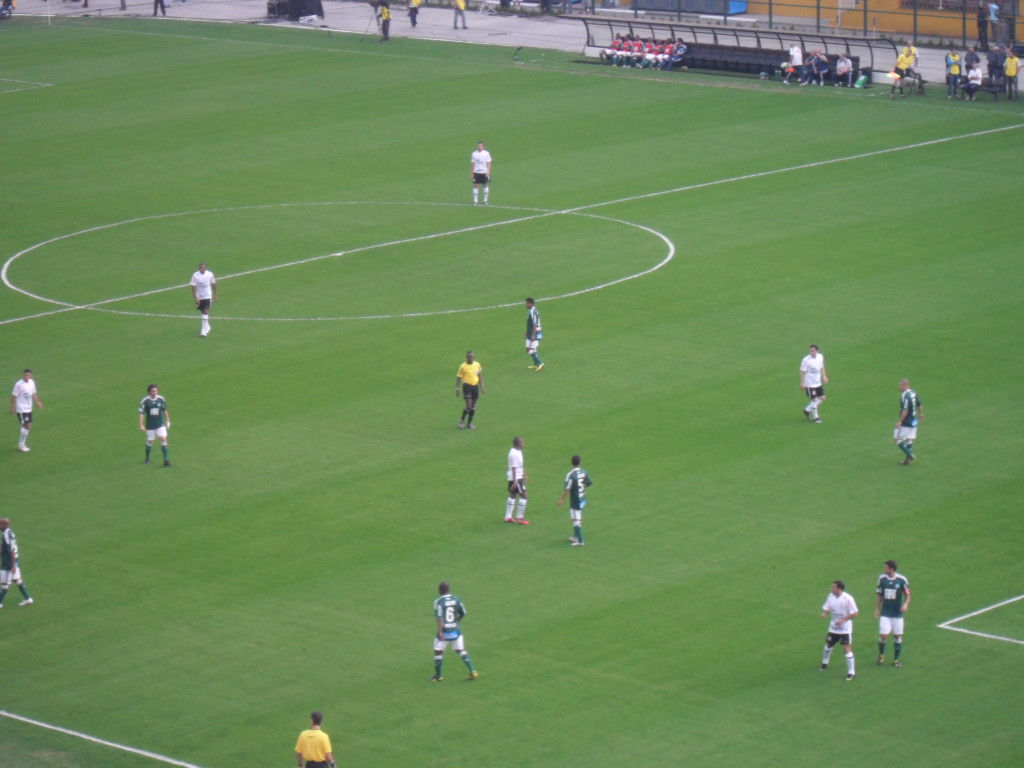
Palmeiras against Corinthians in 2010

=== Corinthians ===
Palmeiras' biggest rival is Corinthians. The rivalry between the two clubs is considered Brazil's greatest, and the most intense in country, entering the conversation of being one of the biggest rivalries in the world, and considerably one of the oldest as well. Their matches are known as the Paulista Derby.

The most important matches between the two clubs were the 1999 Copa Libertadores quarterfinals and 2000 Copa Libertadores semifinals, both won by Palmeiras on penalties.

Palmeiras and Corinthians played the 1994 Campeonato Brasileiro Série A final, also won by Palmeiras 4–2 on aggregate.

Other relevant Palmeiras and Corinthians matches:

- Palmeiras 4-0 Corinthians, 1993 Campeonato Paulista Final Match – Palmeiras ended a series of 16 years without winning a championship.
- Palmeiras 1-0 Corinthians, 1974 Campeonato Paulista Final Match – Palmeiras won the Campeonato Paulista and increased Corinthians's negative series without winning any championships to 21 years.
- Palmeiras 1-1 Corinthians, 1954 Campeonato Paulista Final Match – Corinthians won the Campeonato Paulista dedicated to São Paulo City's quadricentennial.
- Palmeiras 8-0 Corinthians, 1933 Campeonato Paulista Season Match – Largest score of the Derby.

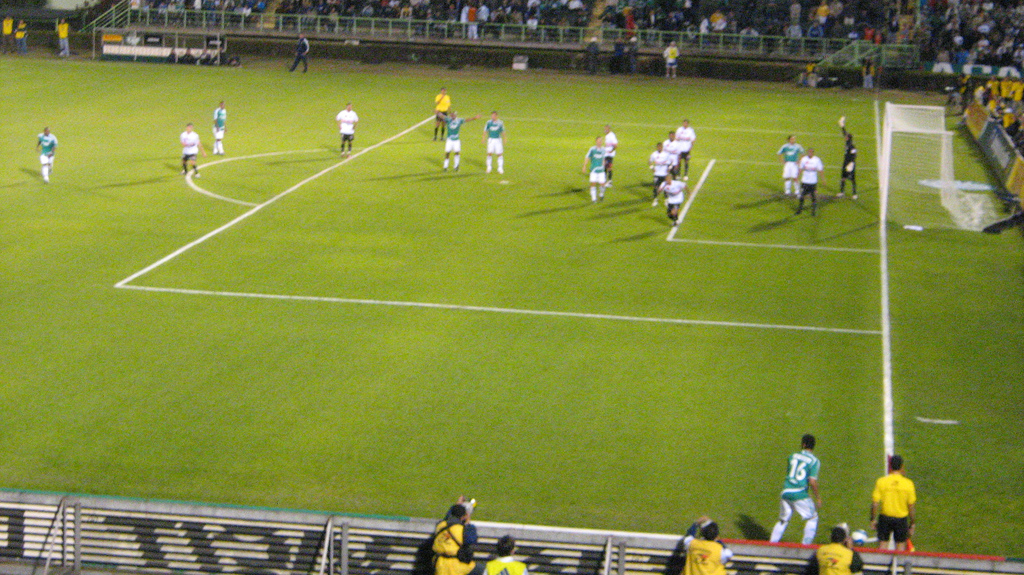
Palmeiras against São Paulo in 2007

The Derby is often featured in Brazilian popular culture. The game is the central plot of Mazzaropi's film O Corintiano (1967), about a barber who is also a Corinthians fan that does not charge services from other Corinthians fans and does not like to provide services to Palmeiras fans.

In O Casamento de Romeu e Julieta, the rivalry between Palmeiras and Corinthians played a major role in the plot.

=== Santos ===
Santos FC is another major rival; the games between the two clubs are called the Clássico da Saudade (The Good Times Classic). Located in the city of the same name, only 76 km (47,5 mi) from São Paulo, Santos is also one of the 4 big clubs of the state.

The most important matches between the two clubs were the 2020 Copa Libertadores Final and 2015 Copa do Brasil Final, both won by Palmeiras.

=== São Paulo ===
São Paulo FC is another local rival; the games between the two clubs are called the Choque-Rei (Clash of Kings).

The most important matches between the two clubs were played in Copa Libertadores. Palmeiras won the Copa Libertadores 2021 quarterfinals by 4–1 on aggregate. Sao Paulo FC won the second round matches of Copa Libertadores 1994, Copa Libertadores 2005 and Copa Libertadores 2006.

The most recent final match featuring both teams was the 2022 Campeonato Paulista won by Palmeiras. The first leg was held on 30 March 2022, and São Paulo FC defeated Palmeiras 3–1. The second leg was held on 3 April 2022 and Palmeiras made a comeback to defeat their rivals 4–0.

== Club culture ==
=== Official mascot ===
The club's official mascots are a green parakeet, named Periquito, and a pig, named Gobatto.

In 1986, at the Campeonato Paulista playoffs, supporters adopted the pig as their mascot. Although the parakeet is the official mascot, fans will refer to and yell: "PORCO!" (Pig) enthusiastically during matches, as the pig became their preferred mascot.

On 6 November 2016, Palmeiras incorporated the pig as one of the official mascots of the club.

=== Media ===
Palmeiras official YouTube channel, TV Palmeiras, has more than 1.8 million subscribers. The channel often exhibits highlights of the training sessions, pre-game preparations, post-game interviews, history facts, etc.

Palmeiras official Instagram account, Palmeiras, has more than 4.4 million subscribers.

Some other channels are dedicated to Palmeiras, for example the PodPorco, which is a podcast managed by Palmeiras fans with the purpose of interviewing people identified with the club, including players, former managers, journalists, famous supporters, etc.

=== Anthem ===
Palmeiras' anthem was composed in 1949 by conductor Antonio Sergi. Sergi also wrote the lyrics for the anthem, but did that under the pseudonym Gennaro Rodrigues.

== Players ==
=== First-team squad ===
As of 1 September 2026

Note: Flags indicate national team as defined under FIFA eligibility rules; some limited exceptions apply. Players may hold more than one non-FIFA nationality.

No.	Pos.	Nation	Player
1	GK	BRA	Carlos Miguel
2	DF	ARG	Alexander Barboza
3	DF	BRA	Bruno Fuchs
4	DF	ARG	Agustín Giay
6	DF	BRA	Jefté
7	MF	BRA	Felipe Anderson
8	MF	BRA	Andreas Pereira
9	FW	BRA	Vitor Roque
10	FW	BRA	Paulinho
11	FW	COL	Jhon Arias
12	DF	BRA	Khellven
14	GK	BRA	Marcelo Lomba
15	DF	PAR	Gustavo Gómez (captain)

No.	Pos.	Nation	Player
17	MF	BRA	Marlon Freitas
18	MF	PAR	Maurício
19	FW	PAR	Ramón Sosa
21	GK	BRA	Bruno Bertinato
22	DF	URU	Joaquín Piquerez
26	DF	BRA	Murilo
30	MF	BRA	Lucas Evangelista
32	MF	URU	Emiliano Martínez
42	FW	ARG	José Manuel López
43	DF	BRA	Luiz Benedetti
48	MF	BRA	Larson
56	DF	BRA	Arthur Gabriel

=== Reserve team ===
Note: Flags indicate national team as defined under FIFA eligibility rules; some limited exceptions apply. Players may hold more than one non-FIFA nationality.

No.	Pos.	Nation	Player
29	FW	CMR	Miguel Bilong
39	FW	BRA	Heittor
41	FW	BRA	Eduardo
44	DF	CIV	Koné Zie
45	MF	BRA	Erick Belé

No.	Pos.	Nation	Player
47	FW	BRA	Victor Gabriel
50	MF	BRA	Luis Pacheco
55	MF	BRA	Rafael Coutinho
66	DF	BRA	André Lucas
72	GK	BRA	Kauan Lima

=== Out on loan ===
Note: Flags indicate national team as defined under FIFA eligibility rules; some limited exceptions apply. Players may hold more than one non-FIFA nationality.

No.	Pos.	Nation	Player
—	GK	BRA	Aranha (at Moreirense until 30 June 2027)
—	DF	BRA	Caio Paulista (at Grêmio until 31 December 2026)
—	DF	BRA	Gilberto (at Athletico Paranaense until 31 December 2026)
—	DF	BRA	Micael (at Inter Miami until 31 December 2026)
—	MF	BRA	Raphael Veiga (at América until 31 December 2026)

No.	Pos.	Nation	Player
—	MF	BRA	Rômulo (at Novorizontino until 31 December 2026)
—	FW	BRA	Bruno Rodrigues (at Cruzeiro until 31 December 2026)
—	FW	BRA	Luighi (at New York City FC until 31 December 2026)}
—	FW	BRA	Sorriso (at Avaí until 31 December 2026)

== Management ==
=== Current staff ===
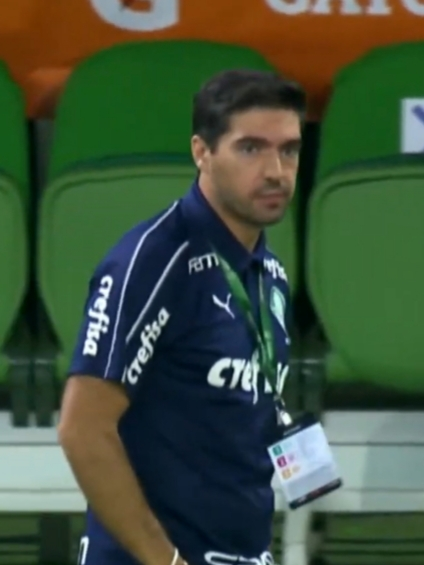
Abel Ferreira

Position	Staff
Head coach	Abel Ferreira
Assistant manager	João Martins; Vítor Castanheira; Carlos Martinho; Andrey Lopes
Goalkeeping coach	Rogério Godoy; Thales Damasceno
Performance analysts	Rafael Costa; Roberto Torrecilhas; Rogério Abreu; Guilherme Camargo
Health and performance center	Dr. Gustavo Magliocca
Medical coordinator	Dr. Pedro Pontin
Scientific coordinator	Dr. Daniel Gonçalves
Physiotherapy coordinator	Fred Manhães
Physiology coordinator	Thiago Santi
Doctors	Dr. Gilberto Cunha; Dr. Victor Soraggi
Medical radiologist	Dr. André Yamada
Physiotherapists	Marcelo Gondo; Rodrigo Alencar; Gustavo Kaschel; Bruno Presotto
Psychologist	Gisele Silva
Fitness coaches	Marco Aurélio Schiavo; Thiago Maldonado
Physiologists	Vinicius Ponzio
Neuroscientist	Luciane Moscaleski
Nutritionists	Mirtes Stancanelli
Nutrition technician	Elaine Francelino de Souza
Dentist	Vitor Ugo Salvoni
Osteopath	José Eduardo
Masseur	Sérgio Luís De Oliveira; Paulo Oliveira Santos; Alan Wagner Gabriel Filho
Nurse	Weber Guimarães
Nursing technician	Daniel Lima
Podiatrist	Rosãngela Rêgo
Market analyst	Guilherme Dias; Guilherme Ximenez; Tássio Dias
Data analyst	Emerson Oki; Matheus Amorim; Tiago Piva
Football director	Anderson Barros
Legal and business manager	Leonardo Holanda
Operational manager	Leonardo Piffer
Process manager	Luís Gustavo Andrade
Supervisor	Artur Albuquerque
Attorney	Ulisses Bresciani; Marcus Salinas
Legal assistance	Bruna Herculano
Logistics	Marcelo Alejandro
Operational	Gabriel Rodrigues; Adilson Andrade; Leandro Silveira
Kit man	Benildo Medrado; Geovan Lima; Flavio da Silva
Security	Edvaldo 'TKS' Querino; Oliver Leonis; Paulo Dorfman; Cachoeira

Last updated: 7 May 2025
Source: Palmeiras

=== Presidents ===
The club associates congregate in a general assembly every four years to elect the seventy-six members of the Conselho Deliberativo (Deliberating Council) who in their turn chose amongst them a president for a two-year mandate. As of 2006 the president can only be re-elected once.

These are all Palmeiras presidents since the club's foundation:

Name	Years
Ezequiel Simone	1914
Leonardo Pareto	1915
Augo Vaccaro	1915
Ludovico Bacchiani	1916
Guido Farti	1917
Dulio Frugoli	1918
Valentino Sola	1918
Menotti Falchi	1919–1920
David Pichetti	1921–1922
Francisco De Vivo	1923–1924
Giuseppe Perrone	1925–1927
Eduardo Matarazzo	1928–1931
Dante Delmanto	1932–1934
Raphael Parisi	1934–1938

Name	Years
Ítalo Adami	1939–1940
Enrico de Martino	1939–1940
João Minervino	1939–1940
Ítalo Adami	1941–1944
Francisco Patti	1945–1946
Higino Pellegrini	1947–1948
Ferrúcio Sandoli	1949–1950
Mário Frugiuelle	1951–1952
Pascoal Walter Byron Giuliano	1953–1954
Mário Beni	1955–1958
Delfino Facchina	1959–1970
Paschoal Walter Byron Giuliano	1971–1976
Jordão Bruno Sacomani	1977–1978
Brício Pompeu Toledo	1977–1978

Name	Years
Delfino Facchina	1979–1980
Brício Pompeu Toledo	1981–1982
Paschoal Walter Byron Giuliano	1983–1984
Nélson Tadini Duque	1985–1988
Carlos Bernardo Facchina Nunes	1989–1992
Mustafá Contursi Goffar Majzoub	1993–2005
Afonso Della Monica Netto	2005–2009
Luiz Gonzaga Belluzzo	2009–2011
Arnaldo Tirone	2011–2012
Paulo Nobre	2013–2016
Mauricio Galiotte	2016–2021
Leila Pereira	2021–

== Records ==
=== Top scorers ===
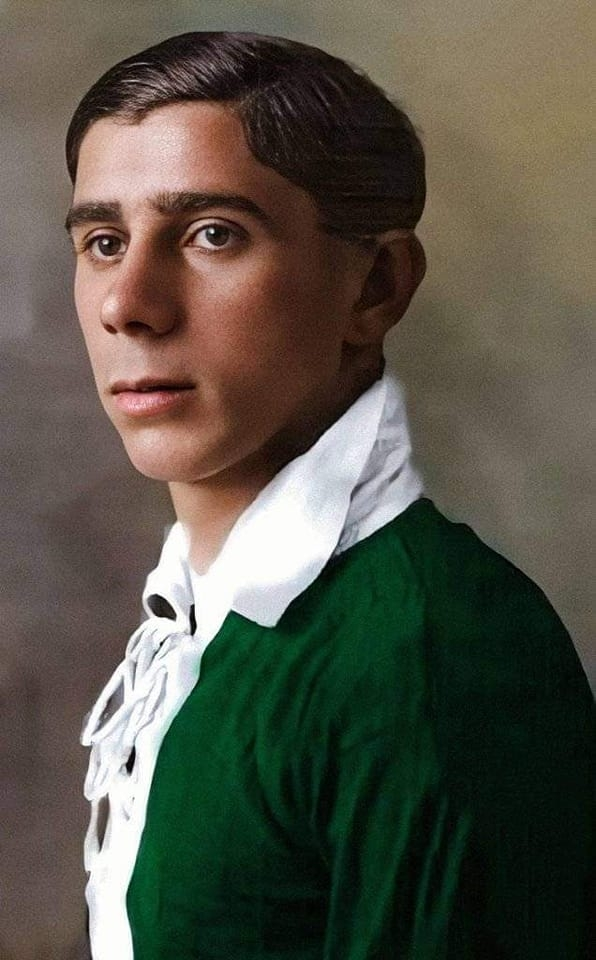
Heitor

These are Palmeiras's top scorers since its foundation (data as of 10 December 2023):

#	Name	Goals	Games	Years
1	(Brazil) Heitor	323	357	1916–31
2	(Brazil) César Maluco	182	327	1967–74
3	(Brazil) Ademir da Guia	155	902	1961–77
4	(Brazil) Lima	149	467	1938–54
5	(Brazil) Servílio	139	292	1963–68
6	(Brazil) Rodrigues	131	240	1950–55,1957
7	(Brazil) Humberto	127	138	1953–58, 1960–61
8	(Brazil) Evair	126	245	1991–94, 1999
9	(Brazil) Luizinho	122	164	1935–41
10	(Brazil) Tupãzinho	122	234	1963–68

=== Most appearances ===
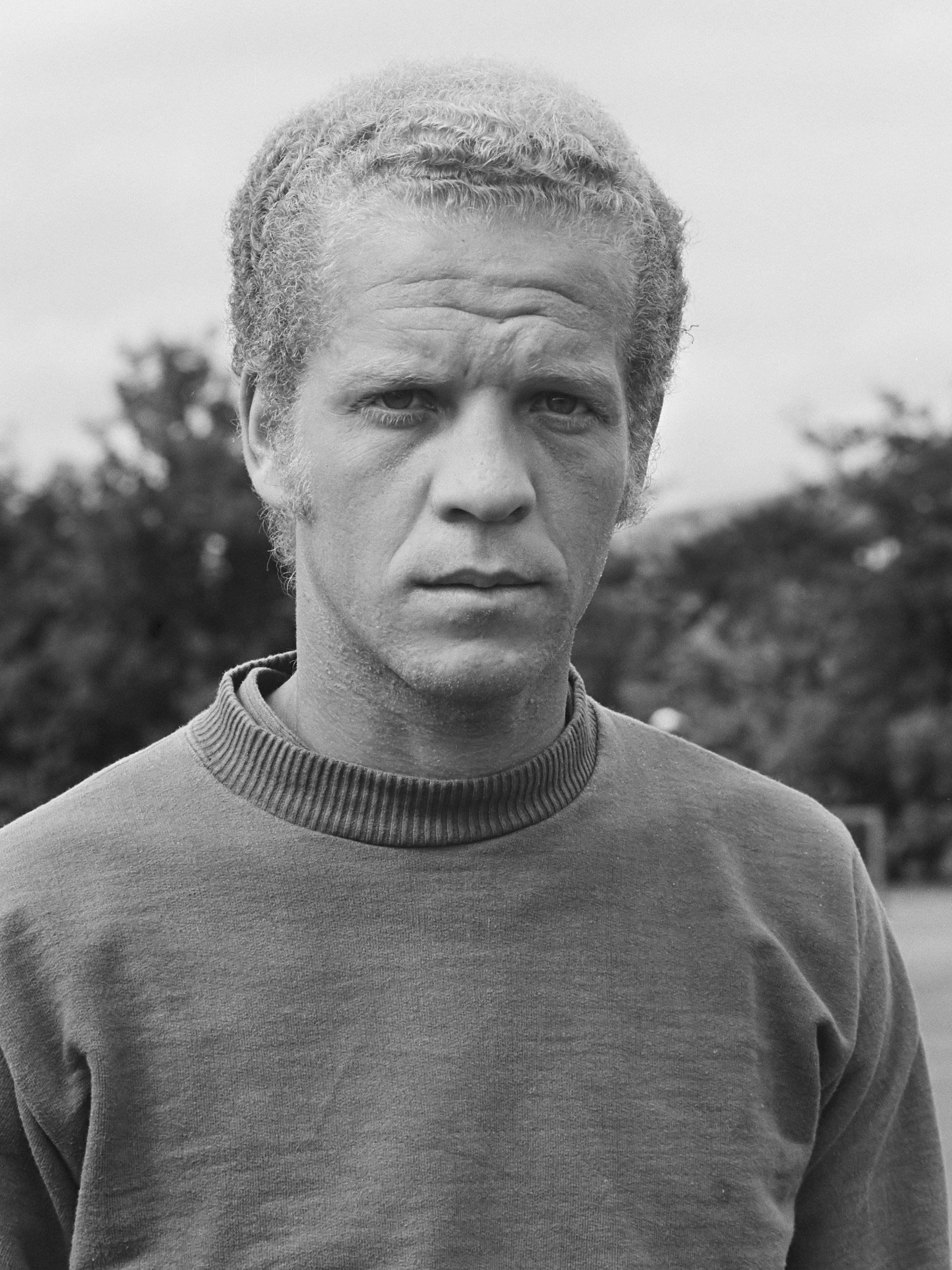
Ademir da Guia

These are Palmeiras's Most Appearances since its foundation (data as of 10 December 2023):

#	Name	Games	Goals	Years
1	(Brazil) Ademir da Guia	902	155	1961–77
2	(Brazil) Émerson Leão	621	0	1969–1978, 1984–1986
3	(Brazil) Waldemar Fiúme	620	27	1941–1958
4	(Brazil) Dudu	615	29	1964–1976
5	(Brazil) Valdemar Carabina	595	9	1954–1966
6	(Brazil) Luís Pereira	576	36	1968–1975, 1981–1984
7	(Brazil) Marcos	533	0	1992–2011
8	(Brazil) Djalma Santos	502	10	1959–1968
9	(Brazil) Nei	490	70	1972–1980
10	(Brazil) Edu Bala	482	75	1969–1977

== Honours ==
The following information is a list of all the honours of Palmeiras since the club was founded.

=== Official tournaments ===
Continental
Competitions	Titles	Seasons
Copa Libertadores	3	1999, 2020, 2021
Copa Mercosur	1^{s}	1998
Recopa Sudamericana	1	2022
International
Competitions	Titles	Seasons
Copa Rio	1^{s}	1951
National
Competitions	Titles	Seasons
Campeonato Brasileiro Série A	12	1960, 1967 (RGP), 1967 (TB), 1969, 1972, 1973, 1993, 1994, 2016, 2018, 2022, 2023
Copa do Brasil	4	1998, 2012, 2015, 2020
Supercopa do Brasil	1	2023
Copa dos Campeões	1^{s}	2000
Campeonato Brasileiro Série B	2	2003, 2013
Inter-state
Competitions	Titles	Seasons
Torneio Rio-São Paulo	5^{s}	1933, 1951, 1965, 1993, 2000
State
Competitions	Titles	Seasons
Campeonato Paulista	27	1920, 1926, 1927, 1932, 1933, 1934, 1936, 1940, 1942, 1944, 1947, 1950, 1959, (Note: Palmeiras defeated Pelé's Santos in a playoff after being level on points through 38 matches.) 1963, 1966, 1972, 1974, 1976, 1993, 1994, 1996, 2008, 2020, 2022, 2023, 2024, 2026,
Campeonato Paulista Extra	2	1926 (APEA), (Note: The APEA organized a second shorter tournament in September to fill the long period of inactivity before the following season.) 1938 (LFESP) (Note: The LFESP organized a second shorter edition of the 1938 Paulistão to fill the nearly six month interruption of the tournament due to the World Cup.)

- record
- ^{s} shared record

=== Others tournaments ===
==== International ====
- Estevão Ronai Trophy (1): 1929
- Fanfulla Cup (1): 1929
- C. Giusti Cup (1): 1931
- Missions Tournament (1): 1947
- Peñarol Cup (1): 1951
- Mexico City Trophy (1): 1952
- Mexico Tournament (2): 1959, 1963
- Manizales City Tournament (1): 1962
- Lima Quadrangular Tournament (1): 1962
- Florence Tournament (1): 1963
- Torneio Internacional do Rio de Janeiro (1): 1965
- Brazil-Uruguay Independence Cup (1): 1965
- João Havelange International Tournament (1): 1966
- Brazil-Japan Cup (1): 1967
- Ramón de Carranza Trophy (3): 1969, 1974, 1975
- Barcelona City Trophy (1): 1969
- Greece Cup (1): 1970
- Mar Del Plata Tournament (1): 1972
- Italian Immigration Centennial Cup (1): 1975
- Kirin Cup (1): 1978*
- Ademir da Guia Trophy (1): 1982
- Trofeo Ciudad de Oviedo (1): 1989
- Copa Euro-América (2): 1991, 1996
- Brazil-Italy Cup (1): 1994
- Lev Yashin Tournament (1): 1994
- China Cup (1): 1996
- Orange Trophy (1): 1997
- Copa EuroAmericana (1): 2014
- Florida Cup (1): 2020

* 1978 Kirin Cup Shared with Borussia Mönchengladbach.

==== National and Inter-state ====
- Troféu Falchi (1): 1918
- Troféu Rio de Janeiro (1): 1920
- Taça Dr. Machado Lima (1): 1921
- Taça Colônia Gaúcha (1): 1926
- Taça ANEA (1): 1926
- Taça dos Campeões Estaduais Rio–São Paulo (4): 1926, 1934, 1942, 1947
- Taça A.A. das Palmeiras (1): 1930
- Taça Porto Alegre (1): 1936
- Torneio do Paraná (1): 1938
- Torneio de Fortaleza (1): 1938
- Torneio dos Campeões (1): 1940
- Troféu Rio Grande do Sul (1): 1946
- Torneio Quadrangular São Paulo-Rio (1): 1952
- Torneio Quadrangular do Recife (1): 1955
- Torneio do Café (1): 1984
- Torneio Maria Quitéria (1): 1997
- Taça Governador de Goiás (1): 1997
- Troféu João Saldanha (3): 2016, 2018, 2025
- Troféu Osmar Santos (3): 2016, 2022, 2026

==== State ====
- Taça Competência (4): 1920, 1926, 1927, 1932
- Taça Cidade de São Paulo (4): 1945, 1946, 1950, 1951
- Troféu Roberto Ugolini (2): 1959, 1960
- Taça Piratininga (3): 1963, 1965, 1966
- Torneio Laudo Natel (1): 1972
- Torneio Início (7): 1927 (APEA), 1930, 1935 (LPF), 1939, 1942, 1946, 1969

=== Runners-up ===
- FIFA Club World Cup (1): 2021
- Intercontinental Cup (1): 1999
- Copa Libertadores (4): 1961, 1968, 2000, 2025
- Recopa Sudamericana (1): 2021
- Copa Mercosur (2): 1999, 2000
- Campeonato Brasileiro Série A (7): 1970, 1978, 1997, 2017, 2024, 2025, 2026
- Copa do Brasil (1): 1996
- Supercopa do Brasil (2): 2021, 2024
- Torneio Rio–São Paulo (1): 1955
- Campeonato Paulista (28): 1917, 1919, 1921, 1922, 1923, 1931, 1935, 1937, 1939, 1949, 1951, 1953, 1954, 1961, 1964, 1965, 1969, 1970, 1971, 1973, 1986, 1992, 1995, 1999, 2015, 2018, 2021, 2025

=== Youth team ===
- Campeonato Brasileiro Sub-20 (4): 2018, 2022, 2024, 2025
- Copa do Brasil Sub-20 (2): 2019, 2022
- Campeonato Brasileiro Sub-17 (2): 2022, 2023
- Copa do Brasil Sub-17 (4): 2017, 2019, 2022, 2023
- Supercopa do Brasil Sub-17 (1): 2019
- Copa São Paulo de Futebol Júnior (2): 2022, 2023
- Supercopa São Paulo de Futebol Júnior (1): 1995
- Taça Belo Horizonte de Juniores (2): 1998, 2002
- Copa Rio Grande do Sul de Futebol Sub-20 (1): 2018
- Copa Santiago de Futebol Juvenil (3): 2018, 2020, 2025
- Copa Votorantim Sub-15 (1): 2018

=== Awards ===
- IFFHS The World's Club Team of the Year: 2021

== Palmeiras B Team ==
For many years, Palmeiras had a "second" team that played in the lower divisions of the Paulista Championship. The team was dissolved at the end of the Paulista 2013.

== Other sports ==
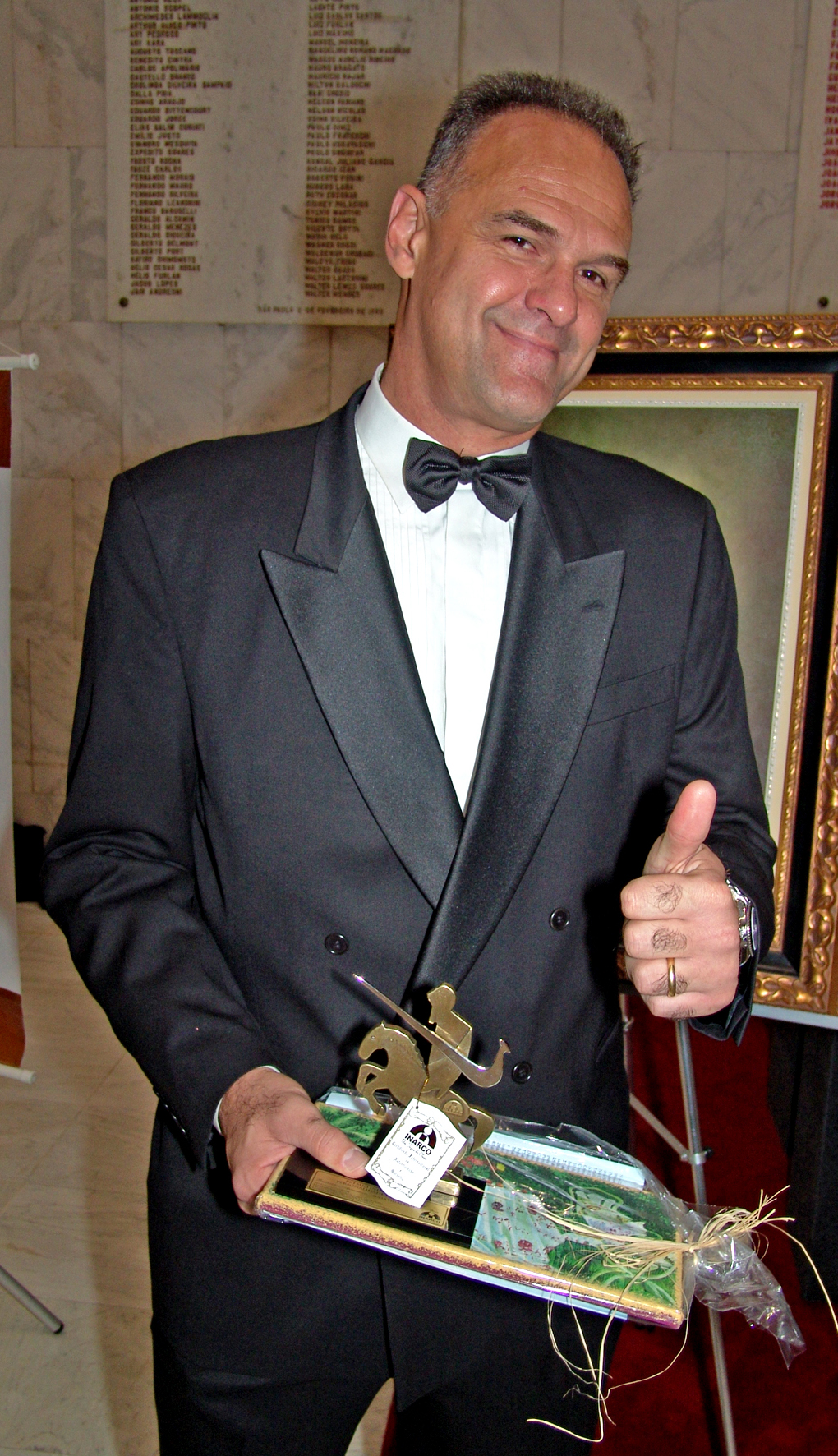
Oscar Schmidt

Palmeiras has athletic departments in many sports, such as aikido, athletics, archery, boxing, american football, futsal, judo, karate, taekwondo, tennis, volleyball and weightlifting. The club has also a victorious tradition in rink hockey and basketball. Palmeiras has in it history 2 Brazilian Roller Hockey National Championships, being one of the main teams from São Paulo.

=== Basketball team ===
Leandro Barbosa and Oscar Schmidt, two of the best Brazilian basketball players of all time, started their careers at Palmeiras.

== See also ==
- Sociedade Esportiva Palmeiras (women)
- Sociedade Esportiva Palmeiras (youth)
- Sociedade Esportiva Palmeiras B
- Sociedade Esportiva Palmeiras (basketball)
