= 2013 Campeonato Piauiense =

Campeonato Piauiense de Futebol
- Season: 2013
- Champions: Parnahyba
- Copa do Brasil: Parnahyba
- Série D: Parnahyba
- Matches: 62
- Goals: 181 (2.92 per match)
- Top goalscorer: Raphael Freitas (Picos) - 10 goals

The 2013 Campeonato Piauiense de Futebol was the 73rd edition of the Piauí's top professional football league. The competition began on January 26, and ended on May 19. Parnahyba won the championship by the 5th time.

== Format ==
On the first stage, all teams play against each other in a double round-robin. The best four teams advances to the semifinals. The semifinals and the finals are played in two-legged ties.

=== Qualifications ===
The champion qualifies to the Série D and Copa do Brasil.

== Participating teams ==
Club	Home city	2012 result
4 de Julho	Piripiri	4th
Barras	Barras	Did not participate
Cori-Sabbá	Floriano	Did not participate
Flamengo-PI	Teresina	2nd
Parnahyba	Parnaíba	1st
Piauí	Teresina	6th
Picos	Picos	7th
Ríver	Teresina	5th

== First stage ==
=== Standings ===
Pos	Team	Pld	W	D	L	GF	GA	GD	Pts	Qualification
1	Ríver	14	8	3	3	20	15	+5	27	Advanced to the Final stage
2	Parnahyba	14	6	4	4	22	19	+3	22	Advanced to the Final stage
3	Flamengo-PI	14	5	7	2	19	13	+6	22	Advanced to the Final stage
4	Piauí	14	4	6	4	19	25	−6	18	Advanced to the Final stage
5	4 de Julho	14	5	2	7	22	20	+2	17	
6	Cori-Sabbá	14	4	4	6	20	21	−1	16	
7	Barras	14	4	4	6	18	26	−8	16	
8	Picos	14	3	4	7	23	24	−1	13	

=== Results ===
Home \ Away	4JU	BAR	COS	FLP	PAR	PIA	PIC	RIV
4 de Julho		1–1	1–2	1–3	2–0	0–0	4–2	1–3
Barras	1–4		1–0	0–0	1–1	3–1	2–0	1–2
Cori-Sabbá	2–1	2–3		1–1	1–2	2–2	3–3	1–1
Flamengo-PI	0–3	1–1	0–2		4–2	5–1	2–1	0–0
Parnahyba	3–1	3–2	2–0	0–0		1–1	3–2	4–1
Piauí	0–3	4–2	1–4	0–0	1–0		3–3	2–1
Picos	2–0	5–0	2–0	1–1	0–0	0–2		0–1
Ríver	1–0	2–0	1–0	0–2	3–1	1–1	3–2	

Legend: Blue = home team win; Yellow = draw; Red = away team win.

== Final stage ==
Semifinals
1	Ríver	2	1	3
4	Piauí	1	2	3
2	Parnahyba	0	4	4
3	Flamengo	2	1	3

Finals
1	Ríver	0	2	2
2	Parnahyba	1	2	3

=== Semifinals ===
==== First leg ====
April 28, 2013
17:00 UTC−03:00

Flamengo	2–0	Parnahyba
Neílson 11'; Niel 24'

Estádio Lindolfo Monteiro, Teresina

April 29, 2013
20:00 UTC−03:00

Piauí	1–2	Ríver
Fabiano 86'		Kamar 27'; Maranhão 59'

Estádio Lindolfo Monteiro, Teresina

==== Second leg ====
May 05, 2013
17:00 UTC−03:00

Parnahyba	4–1	Flamengo
Capela 3', 102'; Ramón 40'; Zé Rodrigues 87'		Alessandro 84'

Estádio Mão Santa, Parnaíba

May 05, 2013
17:00 UTC−03:00

Ríver	1–2	Piauí
Kamar 57'		Fabiano 85', 90+2'

Estádio Lindolfo Monteiro, Teresina

=== Finals ===
May 12, 2013
16:00 UTC−03:00

Parnahyba	1–0	Ríver
Luciano 35'

Estádio Mão Santa, Parnaíba
Referee: Francisco Pereira de Lima Júnior

May 19, 2013
17:00 UTC−03:00

Ríver	2–2	Parnahyba
Kamar 9'; Jeferson 39'		Gilmar Bahia 53'; Jô 86' (o.g.)

Estádio Lindolfo Monteiro, Teresina
Attendance: 5,128
Referee: Antônio Dib Moraes

Parnahyba Sport Club is the champion of the 2013 Campeonato Piauiense.
