= Brinquedo (footballer) =

Brazilian footballer (born 1971)

Personal information
- Full name: José Gonçalves Lopes de Sousa Filho
- Date of birth: 6 July 1971 (age 55)
- Place of birth: Campo Maior, Brazil
- Height: 1.60 m (5 ft 3 in)
- Position: Forward

Senior career*
Years	Team	Apps	(Gls)
1992–1996	Caiçara		
1996	Moto Club		
1997–1999	Picos		
1998	→ Sport Recife (loan)		
2000	Ríver		
2000	Guarani de Juazeiro		
2001	Inhumense		
2001	Ríver		
2002–2003	Coríntians de Caicó		
2003	Baraúnas		
2003	São Gonçalo-RN		
2004	AA Rioverdense		
2004	Caiçara		
2005	São Benedito-CE		
2005	Manchete-PE		
2006–2010	Comercial-PI		
- * Club domestic league appearances and goals as of 17 April 2024

José Gonçalves Lopes de Sousa Filho (born 6 July 1971), better known by the nickname Brinquedo (English: Toy), is a Brazilian former professional footballer who played as a forward.

== Career ==
One of the main players in the history of Piauí football, Brinquedo stood out in the late 90s due to the great performances in the Copa do Brasil, in 1998 against Vasco da Gama and in 2000 against Flamengo. He was loaned to Sport Recife, but stated that he did not receive opportunities due to his unusual nickname. He ended his career after winning the title with Comercial de Campo Maior, a team from his hometown, and where he still works today in training young players.

== Honours ==
Picos

- Campeonato Piauiense: 1997, 1998

Ríver

- Campeonato Piauiense: 2000

Comercial

- Campeonato Piauiense: 2010

Individual

- Campeonato Piauiense top scorer: 1995, 1996, 1997
