= Jaílson (footballer, born 1987) =

Brazilian footballer

Personal information
- Full name: Jaílson Cardoso de Araújo
- Date of birth: 19 July 1987 (age 39)
- Place of birth: Piripiri, Brazil
- Height: 1.83 m (6 ft 0 in)
- Position: Goalkeeper

Youth career
- 4 de Julho

Senior career*
Years	Team	Apps	(Gls)
2005–2008	4 de Julho		
2007	→ Piauí (loan)		
2008–2010	Santa Cruz		
2008	→ Nacional de Patos (loan)		
2009	→ Vitória-PE (loan)		
2011	Vitória-PE		
2012	Petrolina		
2012	4 de Julho		
2012	Botafogo-PB		
2013	Ypiranga-PE		
2013	Olinda		
2014	Cianorte		
2014	Tianguá		
2015	São Benedito		
2015	4 de Julho		
2016	Cianorte		
2016	Altos		
2016	Tianguá		
2017	4 de Julho		
2018	Altos		
2018–2019	Pinheiro		
2019	Timon-PI		
2020	Oeirense		
2020–2022	4 de Julho		
2022	Ferroviário-PI		
2023	4 de Julho		
2023	Pacajus		
2023	Flamengo-PI		
2024	Parnahyba		
2024	Juazeirense		
2024	Comercial-PI		
2025	Juazeirense		
2025	Comercial-PI		
- * Club domestic league appearances and goals as of 18 October 2025

Jaílson Cardoso de Araújo (born 19 July 1987), simply known as Jaílson, is a Brazilian professional footballer who plays as a goalkeeper.

== Career ==
Born in Piripiri, Jaílson was revealed by 4 de Julho, the club for which he played most and became an idol, being state champion in 2020. He was part of the historic matches against São Paulo FC in the 2021 Copa do Brasil. In 2018, with Altos, he was also champion of Piauí, in addition to having defended Santa Cruz, Cianorte, among other teams.

More recently he defended Ferroviário de Parnaíba in the second state division, and Pacajus in the 2023 Campeonato Brasileiro Série D. In 2024 he signed with Parnahyba, but ended up being released 9 days later, being hired by SD Juazeirense. He played for Comercial de Campo Maior in the state second division in 2024, returning to Juazeirense in 2025. He was registered again by Comercial, but terminated his contract before his debut.

== Honours ==
Altos

- Campeonato Piauiense: 2018

4 de Julho

- Campeonato Piauiense: 2020
