= Rafael Araújo (footballer, born 1984) =

Brazilian footballer

Personal information
- Full name: Rafael Silva de Araújo
- Date of birth: 16 November 1984 (age 41)
- Place of birth: Vitória de Santo Antão, Brazil
- Height: 1.81 m (5 ft 11 in)
- Position: Centre-back

Team information
- Current team: Picos

Senior career*
Years	Team	Apps	(Gls)
2007	Itapajé		
2008	Potyguar		
2008	Caiçara		
2009	Santa Cruz–RN		
2009	Alecrim		
2010	Nacional de Patos		
2010–2011	Comercial–PI	10	(0)
2011	→ Coruripe (loan)		
2012	CSA	3	(0)
2013	Flamengo–PI	0	(0)
2013–2014	Grêmio Barueri	7	(2)
2014–2016	River-PI	30	(1)
2017	Itumbiara	0	(0)
2017	Treze	0	(0)
2017	Salgueiro	3	(0)
2018	Campinense	0	(0)
2019	Vitória das Tabocas	0	(0)
2019	Central-PE	8	(0)
2019	Cori-Sabbá	0	(0)
2020	Treze	3	(0)
2020	Vitória das Tabocas	2	(0)
2020–2021	Altos	37	(0)
2021	Oeirense	13	(0)
2022	Comercial-PI	7	(1)
2022	Central	5	(0)
2023	Comercial-PI	10	(1)
2023	Piauí	6	(0)
2024–	Picos	5	(1)
- * Club domestic league appearances and goals as of 19:51, 18 February 2024 (UTC)

Rafael Silva de Araújo (born November 16, 1984, in Vitória de Santo Antão), known as Rafael Araújo, is a Brazilian footballer who plays for Picos as defender.

== Career statistics ==
As of 22 October 2019

Club	Season	League			State League		Cup		Conmebol		Other		Total	
Club	Season	Division	Apps	Goals	Apps	Goals	Apps	Goals	Apps	Goals	Apps	Goals	Apps	Goals
Comercial–PI	2011	Série D	7	0	—		2	1	—		—		9	1
CSA	2012	Série D	3	0	—		—		—		—		3	0
Flamengo–PI	2013	Piauiense	—		—		2	0	—		—		2	0
Grêmio Barueri	2013	Série C	7	2	—		—		—		—		7	2
Grêmio Barueri	2014	Série D	—		8	0	—		—		—		8	0
Grêmio Barueri	Subtotal		7	2	8	0	—		—		—		15	2
Ríver	2014	Série D	6	1	—		—		—		—		6	1
Ríver	2015	Série D	15	0	12	0	2	0	—		2 (Note: Appearances in 2015 Copa do Nordeste.)	0	31	0
Ríver	2016	Série C	9	0	13	1	3	0	—		5 (Note: Appearances in 2016 Copa do Nordeste.)	1	30	2
Ríver	Subtotal		30	1	25	1	5	0	—		7	1	67	3
Itumbiara	2017	Goiano	—		7	0	—		—		—		3	0
Treze	2017	Campeonato Paraibano	—		8	0	—		—		—		8	0
Salgueiro	2017	Série C	3	0	—		—		—		—		3	0
Campinense	2018	Campeonato Paraibano	—		11	1	—		—		—		11	1
Vitória das Tabocas	2019	Campeonato Pernambucano	—		8	0	—		—		—		8	0
Central-PE	2019	Série D	8	0	—		—		—		—		8	0
Corri-Sabbá	2019	Piauiense Division 2	—		5	0	—		—		—		5	0
Treze	2020	Série D	0	0	0	0	—		—		—		0	0
Career total			58	3	72	2	9	1	0	0	7	1	146	7
