= Flávio Araújo =

Brazilian football manager (born 1963)

Personal information
- Full name: Flávio José Araújo
- Date of birth: 30 January 1963 (age 63)
- Place of birth: Fortaleza, Brazil

Team information
- Current team: Sergipe (head coach)

Managerial career
- Years: Team
- 1999–2000: Fortaleza
- 2001: Tiradentes-CE
- 2001: Ceará
- 2002: Ferroviário
- 2002: Guarany de Sobral
- 2003: Maranguape
- 2003: Ríver
- 2003: Icasa
- 2003: 4 de Julho
- 2004: Uniclinic
- 2004: Parnahyba
- 2005: Icasa
- 2005: Parnahyba
- 2006: Central de Caruaru
- 2006: Potiguar de Mossoró
- 2006: Icasa
- 2007: Ríver
- 2007: Barras
- 2008: Maracanã
- 2008: Flamengo do Piauí
- 2009: Sampaio Corrêa
- 2009: Maracanã
- 2009–2010: Barras
- 2010: Icasa
- 2011–2012: Fortaleza
- 2012: América de Natal
- 2012: Sampaio Corrêa
- 2013: Remo
- 2013–2014: Sampaio Corrêa
- 2015: Ríver
- 2016: Fortaleza
- 2016: Mogi Mirim
- 2016: Cuiabá
- 2016: Sampaio Corrêa
- 2017: América de Natal
- 2017–2018: CSA
- 2018: Treze
- 2019: Sampaio Corrêa
- 2019: Ríver
- 2019: Treze
- 2019: Icasa
- 2020: Ríver
- 2021: 4 de Julho
- 2021: Oeirense
- 2021: Icasa
- 2022: Bahia de Feira
- 2022–2023: Campinense
- 2023: Nacional de Patos
- 2023: Icasa
- 2024: Altos
- 2024: Iguatu
- 2024: Piauí
- 2025: Maranhão
- 2025: Teresina
- 2026: Fluminense-PI
- 2026–: Sergipe

Flávio José Araújo (born 30 January 1963) is a Brazilian football coach, currently the head coach of Sergipe.

== Honours ==
Fortaleza

- Campeonato Cearense: 2000
- Copa dos Campeões Cearenses: 2016

Icasa

- Campeonato Cearense Série B: 2003, 2010

4 de Julho

- Campeonato Piauiense Série B: 2003

Parnahyba

- Campeonato Piauiense: 2004, 2005

Barras

- Campeonato Piauiense: 2008

Flamengo-PI

- Copa Piauí: 2008

Sampaio Corrêa

- Campeonato Maranhense: 2012, 2014
- Campeonato Brasileiro Série D: 2012

River

- Campeonato Piauiense: 2015, 2019

CSA

- Campeonato Brasileiro Série C: 2017
