= Crislan =

Brazilian footballer (born 1992)

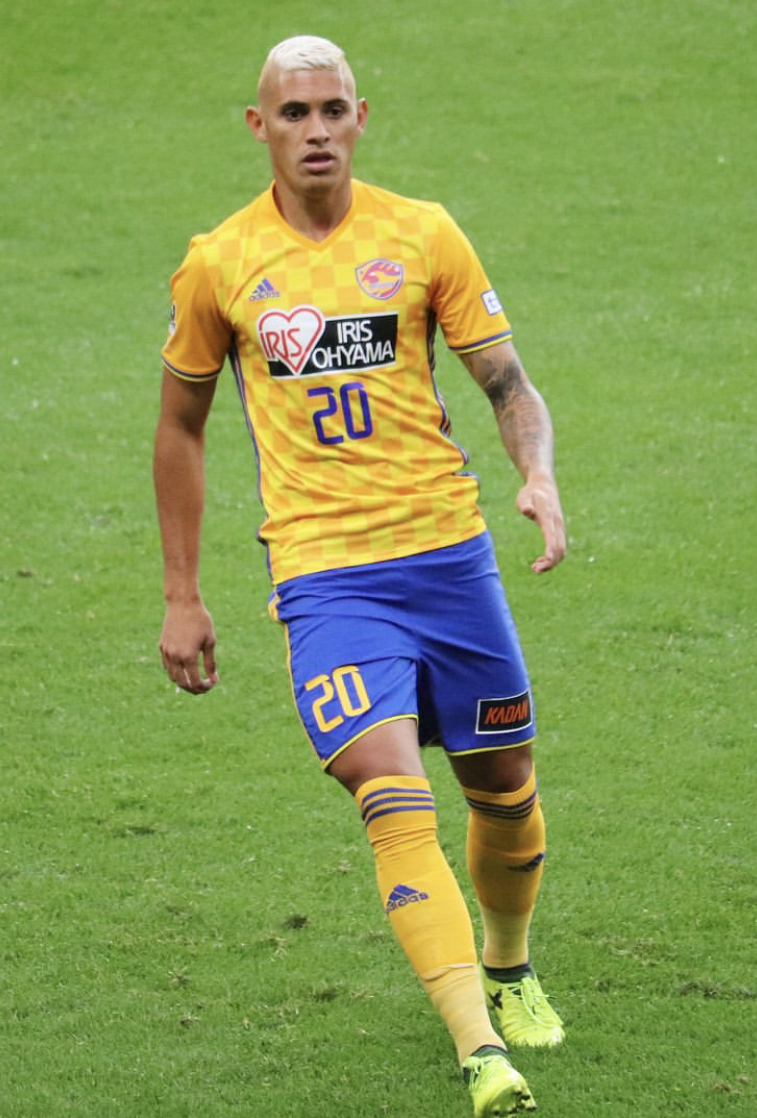

Personal information
- Full name: Crislan Henrique da Silva de Sousa
- Date of birth: 13 March 1992 (age 34)
- Place of birth: Teresina, Brazil
- Height: 1.87 m (6 ft 2 in)
- Position: Forward

Team information
- Current team: Gokulam Kerala

Youth career
- 2010–2011: Caiçara
- 2011: Fluminense-PI
- 2011: Comercial

Senior career*
Years	Team	Apps	(Gls)
2011–2012	Comercial	1	(0)
2012	River	13	(6)
2012	→ Belo Jardim (loan)	8	(0)
2012–2015	Andraus	0	(0)
2013	→ Athletico Paranaense (loan)	12	(3)
2013	→ Boa Esporte (loan)	4	(0)
2014	→ Athletico Paranaense (loan)	13	(4)
2014	→ Náutico (loan)	18	(4)
2015	→ Penapolense (loan)	13	(9)
2015–2020	Braga	22	(3)
2016	→ Tondela (loan)	12	(1)
2017	→ Vegalta Sendai (loan)	37	(13)
2018	→ Shimizu S-Pulse (loan)	26	(5)
2019	→ Shonan Bellmare (loan)	8	(0)
2021	Bucheon	20	(5)
2022–2023	Brusque	23	(1)
2023	Nakhon Ratchasima	14	(6)
2023	Bhayangkara	13	(3)
2024	River	12	(2)
2024	Nakhon Si United	12	(3)
2025–2026	Trat	17	(4)
2026–	Gokulam Kerala	4	(6)
- * Club domestic league appearances and goals as of October 2026

Crislan Henrique da Silva de Sousa (born 13 March 1992), simply known as Crislan, is a Brazilian professional footballer who plays as a forward for Indian Football League club Gokulam Kerala.

== Playing career ==
Born in Teresina, Piauí, Crislan made his senior debuts with Comercial before joining Belo Jardim in 2012, on loan from River. He subsequently returned to the latter in April, appearing regularly and being the club's top scorer with six goals in Campeonato Piauiense.

On 27 December 2012 Crislan joined Série A club Atlético Paranaense, initially assigned to the under-23 team. Despite being a starter in 2013 Campeonato Paranaense, he was loaned to Boa Esporte on 26 September 2013, until December.

Crislan only appeared rarely and subsequently returned to Furacão in January 2014. After being again with the under-23s, he joined Náutico on 10 July, on loan until the end of the season.

On 29 November 2014 Crislan announced his departure from Timbu, and also signed for Penapolense. After scoring nine goals in 2015 Campeonato Paulista, he was linked to Santos and a number of clubs from Rio de Janeiro.

On 1 July 2015 Crislan signed a five-year deal with Braga. He made his Primeira Liga debut on 16 August, starting in a 2–1 home win against Nacional, and scored his first goal late in the month, netting the third in a 4–0 home routing of Boavista

On 27 July 2016, he joined Tondela of Primeira Liga on a one-year loan.

In 2021, Crislan joined Bucheon of K League 2.

In 2022, he moved to Brusque of Campeonato Brasileiro Série B.

== Career statistics ==
Updated to 21 October 2023.

Club	Season	League			State League		Cup		League Cup		Continental		Other		Total	
Club	Season	Division	Apps	Goals	Apps	Goals	Apps	Goals	Apps	Goals	Apps	Goals	Apps	Goals	Apps	Goals
Comercial-PI	2011	—			—		1	0	—		—		—		1	0
River	2012	—			13	6	—		—		—		—		13	6
Belo Jardim (loan)	2012	—			8	0	—		—		—		—		8	0
Atlético Paranaense (loan)	2013	Série A	—		12	3	0	0	—		—		—		12	3
Boa Esporte (loan)	2013	Série B	4	0	—		—		—		—		—		4	0
Atlético Paranaense (loan)	2014	Série A	—		11	4	0	0	—		2	0	—		13	4
Náutico (loan)	2014	Série B	18	4	—		—		—		—		—		18	4
Penapolense (loan)	2015	—			13	9	—		—		—		—		13	9
Braga	2015-16	Primeira Liga	13	2	—		2	0	0	0	5	1	—		20	3
Braga	2016-17	Primeira Liga	1	0	—		—		1	0	—		—		2	0
Braga	Total		14	2	0	0	2	0	1	0	5	1	0	0	22	3
Tondela (loan)	2016-17	Primeira Liga	11	0	—		0	0	1	0	—		—		12	0
Vegalta Sendai (loan)	2017	J1 League	29	8	—		1	0	7	5	—		—		37	13
Shimizu S-Pulse (loan)	2018	J1 League	24	5	—		1	0	1	0	—		—		26	5
Shonan Bellmare (loan)	2019	J1 League	6	0	—		—		—		—		2	0	8	0
Bucheon	2021	K League 2	20	5	—		2	1	—		—		—		22	6
Brusque	2022	Série B	21	1	2	0	—		—		—		—		23	1
Nakhon Ratchasima	2022–23	Thai League 1	14	6	—		2	2	—		—		—		16	8
Bhayangkara	2023–24	Liga 1	13	3	—		—		—		—		—		13	3
Career total			174	34	59	22	9	3	10	5	7	1	2	0	261	65

== Honours ==
Braga

- Taça de Portugal: 2015–16

Vegalta Sendai

- J1.League Monthly Best Goal: 2017
- J.League Cup Top Scorer: 2017
