= Jairo (footballer, born 1988) =

Brazilian footballer

Personal information
- Full name: Francisco Jairo Silva Santos
- Date of birth: 31 January 1988 (age 38)
- Place of birth: Picos, Piauí, Brazil
- Height: 1.84 m (6 ft 0 in)
- Position: Midfielder

Youth career
- –2006: Santa Cruz

Senior career*
Years	Team	Apps	(Gls)
2006–2007	Santa Cruz		
2007–2012	Villa Rio	4	(1)
2007–2008	→ Palmeiras B (loan)	3	(0)
2008–2010	→ Figueirense (loan)	10	(1)
2010	→ Mirassol (loan)	0	(0)
2010–2011	→ Al Naser (loan)	13	(1)
2011	→ Guarani (loan)	6	(0)
2012	→ América-RN (loan)	0	(0)
2012–2013	CRB	5	(0)
2013–2014	Al-Sulaibikhat		
2014–2016	Campinense	1	(0)
2016	Vitória da Conquista	0	(0)
2017	Santa Cruz RN	8	(0)
2018	Santa Rita	13	(1)
2018	Almirante Barroso	3	(0)
2019	Nacional-PB	10	(0)
2020–2021	Campinense	5	(2)
2020	→ Ríver (loan)	16	(1)
2021	Picos	1	(1)
2022	Oeirense		
2022	Picos		
2023	Comercial-PI		
2023	Real-PR		
2024	Comercial-PI		
2025	Guarani de Juazeiro		
- * Club domestic league appearances and goals as of 18:50, 12 October 2025 (UTC)

Francisco Jairo Silva Santos (born 31 January 1988 in Picos, Piauí), commonly called as Jairo, is a Brazilian footballer who plays as a midfielder.

Jairo played for Santa Cruz and Figueirense in the Campeonato Brasileiro.
