= List of Copa do Brasil winners =

The Copa do Brasil is an annual football competitions for clubs in Brazil established in 1989. The competition is open to the top teams from Brazil's state leagues, as well as the top ten clubs in the country. Sixty-four teams qualify and compete in a two-legged single elimination tournament that culminates in the finals. The finals is contested over two legs, an away game and a home game but from 2026 onwards, a final only played with a single match format.

Thirteen teams have won the competition. Cruzeiro is the most successful team in the history of the competition, having won it six times. Teams from São Paulo state have won the tournament ten times, more than any other state. Only Cruzeiro won the title consecutively in the years 2017 and 2018. In fact, from 2001 to 2012, such a feat was impossible, as teams who won the tournament were not allowed to defend their title on the following year due to scheduling conflicts with the Copa Libertadores. Starting in 2013, the Copa do Brasil was rescheduled so that it could be run alongside international competitions. Thus, it is now possible for teams to defend their titles.

== Key ==
#	Finals decided on goal difference
‡	Finals decided on away goals
*	Finals decided by a penalty shootout
**Bold**	Indicates the winner in two-legged finals
Year	Each link is the relevant Copa do Brasil article for that year

== List of winners ==
Two-legged format (1989-2025)
Year	State	Home team	Score	Away team	State	Venue	Location	Refs
1989	(Pernambuco) PE	Sport Recife	0–0	**Grêmio**	(Rio Grande do Sul) RS	Ilha do Retiro	Recife, Pernambuco	
1989	(Rio Grande do Sul) RS	**Grêmio**	2–1	Sport Recife	(Pernambuco) PE	Estádio Olímpico Monumental	Porto Alegre, Rio Grande do Sul	
1989	Grêmio won 3–1 on points.							
1990	(Rio de Janeiro (state)) RJ	**Flamengo**	1–0	Goiás	(Goiás) GO	Estádio Mário Helênio	Juiz de Fora, Minas Gerais	
1990	(Goiás) GO	Goiás	0–0	**Flamengo**	(Rio de Janeiro (state)) RJ	Estádio Serra Dourada	Goiânia, Goiás	
1990	Flamengo won 3–1 on points.							
1991	(Rio Grande do Sul) RS	Grêmio	1–1	**Criciúma**	(Santa Catarina (state)) SC	Estádio Olímpico Monumental	Porto Alegre, Rio Grande do Sul	
1991	(Santa Catarina (state)) SC	**Criciúma**	0–0	Grêmio	(Rio Grande do Sul) RS	Estádio Heriberto Hülse	Criciúma, Santa Catarina	
1991	Tied 2–2 on points, Criciúma won on away goals. ‡							
1992	(Rio de Janeiro (state)) RJ	Fluminense	2–1	**Internacional**	(Rio Grande do Sul) RS	Estádio das Laranjeiras	Rio de Janeiro, Rio de Janeiro	
1992	(Rio Grande do Sul) RS	**Internacional**	1–0	Fluminense	(Rio de Janeiro (state)) RJ	Estádio Beira-Rio	Porto Alegre, Rio Grande do Sul	
1992	Tied 2–2 on points, Internacional won on away goals. ‡							
1993	(Rio Grande do Sul) RS	Grêmio	0–0	**Cruzeiro**	(Minas Gerais) MG	Estádio Olímpico Monumental	Porto Alegre, Rio Grande do Sul	
1993	(Minas Gerais) MG	**Cruzeiro**	2–1	Grêmio	(Rio Grande do Sul) RS	Mineirão	Belo Horizonte, Minas Gerais	
1993	Cruzeiro won 3–1 on points.							
1994	(Ceará) CE	Ceará	0–0	**Grêmio**	(Rio Grande do Sul) RS	Castelão	Fortaleza, Ceará	
1994	(Rio Grande do Sul) RS	**Grêmio**	1–0	Ceará	(Ceará) CE	Estádio Olímpico Monumental	Porto Alegre, Rio Grande do Sul	
1994	Grêmio won 3–1 on points.							
1995	(São Paulo (state)) SP	**Corinthians**	2–1	Grêmio	(Rio Grande do Sul) RS	Pacaembu	São Paulo, São Paulo	
1995	(Rio Grande do Sul) RS	Grêmio	0–1	**Corinthians**	(São Paulo (state)) SP	Estádio Olímpico Monumental	Porto Alegre, Rio Grande do Sul	
1995	Corinthians won 4–0 on points.							
1996	(Minas Gerais) MG	**Cruzeiro**	1–1	Palmeiras	(São Paulo (state)) SP	Mineirão	Belo Horizonte, Minas Gerais	
1996	(São Paulo (state)) SP	Palmeiras	1–2	**Cruzeiro**	(Minas Gerais) MG	Estádio Palestra Itália	São Paulo, São Paulo	
1996	Cruzeiro won 4–1 on points.							
1997	(Rio Grande do Sul) RS	**Grêmio**	0–0	Flamengo	(Rio de Janeiro (state)) RJ	Estádio Olímpico Monumental	Porto Alegre, Rio Grande do Sul	
1997	(Rio de Janeiro (state)) RJ	Flamengo	2–2	**Grêmio**	(Rio Grande do Sul) RS	Maracanã	Rio de Janeiro, Rio de Janeiro	
1997	Tied 2–2 on points, Grêmio won on away goals. ‡							
1998	(Minas Gerais) MG	Cruzeiro	1–0	**Palmeiras**	(São Paulo (state)) SP	Mineirão	Belo Horizonte, Minas Gerais	
1998	(São Paulo (state)) SP	**Palmeiras**	2–0	Cruzeiro	(Minas Gerais) MG	Morumbi	São Paulo, São Paulo	
1998	Tied 3–3 on points, Palmeiras won on better goal difference. #							
1999	(Rio Grande do Sul) RS	**Juventude**	2–1	Botafogo	(Rio de Janeiro (state)) RJ	Estádio Alfredo Jaconi	Caxias do Sul, Rio Grande do Sul	
1999	(Rio de Janeiro (state)) RJ	Botafogo	0–0	**Juventude**	(Rio Grande do Sul) RS	Maracanã	Rio de Janeiro, Rio de Janeiro	
1999	Juventude won 4–1 on points.							
2000	(São Paulo (state)) SP	São Paulo	0–0	**Cruzeiro**	(Minas Gerais) MG	Morumbi	São Paulo, São Paulo	
2000	(Minas Gerais) MG	**Cruzeiro**	2–1	São Paulo	(São Paulo (state)) SP	Mineirão	Belo Horizonte, Minas Gerais	
2000	Cruzeiro won 4–1 on points.							
2001	(Rio Grande do Sul) RS	**Grêmio**	2–2	Corinthians	(São Paulo (state)) SP	Estádio Olímpico Monumental	Porto Alegre, Rio Grande do Sul	
2001	(São Paulo (state)) SP	Corinthians	1–3	**Grêmio**	(Rio Grande do Sul) RS	Morumbi	São Paulo, São Paulo	
2001	Grêmio won 4–1 on points.							
2002	(São Paulo (state)) SP	**Corinthians**	2–1	Brasiliense	(Federal District (Brazil)) DF	Morumbi	São Paulo, São Paulo	
2002	(Federal District (Brazil)) DF	Brasiliense	1–1	**Corinthians**	(São Paulo (state)) SP	Serejão	Taguatinga, Federal District	
2002	Corinthians won 4–1 on points.							
2003	(Rio de Janeiro (state)) RJ	Flamengo	1–1	**Cruzeiro**	(Minas Gerais) MG	Maracanã	Rio de Janeiro, Rio de Janeiro	
2003	(Minas Gerais) MG	**Cruzeiro**	3–1	Flamengo	(Rio de Janeiro (state)) RJ	Mineirão	Belo Horizonte, Minas Gerais	
2003	Cruzeiro won 4–1 on points.							
2004	(São Paulo (state)) SP	**Santo André**	2–2	Flamengo	(Rio de Janeiro (state)) RJ	Estádio Palestra Itália	São Paulo, São Paulo	
2004	(Rio de Janeiro (state)) RJ	Flamengo	0–2	**Santo André**	(São Paulo (state)) SP	Maracanã	Rio de Janeiro, Rio de Janeiro	
2004	Santo André won 4–1 on points.							
2005	(São Paulo (state)) SP	**Paulista**	2–0	Fluminense	(Rio de Janeiro (state)) RJ	Estádio Jayme Cintra	Jundiaí, São Paulo	
2005	(Rio de Janeiro (state)) RJ	Fluminense	0–0	**Paulista**	(São Paulo (state)) SP	Estádio São Januário	Rio de Janeiro, Rio de Janeiro	
2005	Paulista won 4–1 on points.							
2006	(Rio de Janeiro (state)) RJ	**Flamengo**	2–0	Vasco da Gama	(Rio de Janeiro (state)) RJ	Maracanã	Rio de Janeiro, Rio de Janeiro	
2006	(Rio de Janeiro (state)) RJ	Vasco da Gama	0–1	**Flamengo**	(Rio de Janeiro (state)) RJ	Maracanã	Rio de Janeiro, Rio de Janeiro	
2006	Flamengo won 6–0 on points.							
2007	(Rio de Janeiro (state)) RJ	**Fluminense**	1–1	Figueirense	(Santa Catarina (state)) SC	Maracanã	Rio de Janeiro, Rio de Janeiro	
2007	(Santa Catarina (state)) SC	Figueirense	0–1	**Fluminense**	(Rio de Janeiro (state)) RJ	Estádio Orlando Scarpelli	Florianópolis, Santa Catarina	
2007	Fluminense won 4–1 on points.							
2008	(São Paulo (state)) SP	Corinthians	3–1	**Sport Recife**	(Pernambuco) PE	Morumbi	São Paulo, São Paulo	
2008	(Pernambuco) PE	**Sport Recife**	2–0	Corinthians	(São Paulo (state)) SP	Ilha do Retiro	Recife, Pernambuco	
2008	Tied 3–3 on points and equal on goal difference, Sport won on away goals. ‡							
2009	(São Paulo (state)) SP	**Corinthians**	2–0	Internacional	(Rio Grande do Sul) RS	Pacaembu	São Paulo, São Paulo	
2009	(Rio Grande do Sul) RS	Internacional	2–2	**Corinthians**	(São Paulo (state)) SP	Estádio Beira-Rio	Porto Alegre, Rio Grande do Sul	
2009	Corinthians won 4–1 on points.							
2010	(São Paulo (state)) SP	**Santos**	2–0	Vitória	(Bahia) BA	Vila Belmiro	Santos, São Paulo	
2010	(Bahia) BA	Vitória	2–1	**Santos**	(São Paulo (state)) SP	Barradão	Salvador, Bahia	
2010	Tied 3–3 on points, Santos won better goal difference. #							
2011	(Rio de Janeiro (state)) RJ	**Vasco da Gama**	1–0	Coritiba	(Paraná (state)) PR	Estádio São Januário	Rio de Janeiro, Rio de Janeiro	
2011	(Paraná (state)) PR	Coritiba	3–2	**Vasco da Gama**	(Rio de Janeiro (state)) RJ	Couto Pereira	Curitiba, Paraná	
2011	Tied 3–3 on points and equal on goal difference, Vasco da Gama won on away goals. ‡							
2012	(São Paulo (state)) SP	**Palmeiras**	2–0	Coritiba	(Paraná (state)) PR	Arena Barueri	Barueri, São Paulo	
2012	(Paraná (state)) PR	Coritiba	1–1	**Palmeiras**	(São Paulo (state)) SP	Couto Pereira	Curitiba, Paraná	
2012	Palmeiras won 4–1 on points.							
2013	(Paraná (state)) PR	Atlético Paranaense	1–1	**Flamengo**	(Rio de Janeiro (state)) RJ	Vila Capanema	Curitiba, Paraná	
2013	(Rio de Janeiro (state)) RJ	**Flamengo**	2–0	Atlético Paranaense	(Paraná (state)) PR	Maracanã	Rio de Janeiro, Rio de Janeiro	
2013	Flamengo won 4–1 on points.							
2014	(Minas Gerais) MG	**Atlético Mineiro**	2–0	Cruzeiro	(Minas Gerais) MG	Estádio Independência	Belo Horizonte, Minas Gerais	
2014	(Minas Gerais) MG	Cruzeiro	0–1	**Atlético Mineiro**	(Minas Gerais) MG	Mineirão	Belo Horizonte, Minas Gerais	
2014	Atlético Mineiro won 6–0 on points.							
2015	(São Paulo (state)) SP	Santos	1–0	**Palmeiras**	(São Paulo (state)) SP	Vila Belmiro	Santos, São Paulo	
2015	(São Paulo (state)) SP	**Palmeiras**	2–1	Santos	(São Paulo (state)) SP	Allianz Parque	São Paulo, São Paulo	
2015	Tied 3–3 on points and equal on goal difference, Palmeiras won 4–3 on penalties. *							
2016	(Minas Gerais) MG	Atlético Mineiro	1–3	**Grêmio**	(Rio Grande do Sul) RS	Mineirão	Belo Horizonte, Minas Gerais	
2016	(Rio Grande do Sul) RS	**Grêmio**	1–1	Atlético Mineiro	(Minas Gerais) MG	Arena do Grêmio	Porto Alegre, Rio Grande do Sul	
2016	Grêmio won 4–1 on points.							
2017	(Rio de Janeiro (state)) RJ	Flamengo	1–1	**Cruzeiro**	(Minas Gerais) MG	Maracanã	Rio de Janeiro, Rio de Janeiro	
2017	(Minas Gerais) MG	**Cruzeiro**	0–0	Flamengo	(Rio de Janeiro (state)) RJ	Mineirão	Belo Horizonte, Minas Gerais	
2017	Tied 2–2 on points and equal on goal difference, Cruzeiro won 5–3 on penalties. *							
2018	(Minas Gerais) MG	**Cruzeiro**	1–0	Corinthians	(São Paulo (state)) SP	Mineirão	Belo Horizonte, Minas Gerais	
2018	(São Paulo (state)) SP	Corinthians	1–2	**Cruzeiro**	(Minas Gerais) MG	Arena Corinthians	São Paulo, São Paulo	
2018	Cruzeiro won 6–0 on points.							
2019	(Paraná (state)) PR	**Athletico Paranaense**	1–0	Internacional	(Rio Grande do Sul) RS	Arena da Baixada	Curitiba, Paraná	
2019	(Rio Grande do Sul) RS	Internacional	1–2	**Athletico Paranaense**	(Paraná (state)) PR	Estádio Beira-Rio	Porto Alegre, Rio Grande do Sul	
2019	Athletico Paranaense won 6–0 on points.							
2020	(Rio Grande do Sul) RS	Grêmio	0–1	**Palmeiras**	(São Paulo (state)) SP	Arena do Grêmio	Porto Alegre, Rio Grande do Sul	
2020	(São Paulo (state)) SP	**Palmeiras**	2–0	Grêmio	(Rio Grande do Sul) RS	Allianz Parque	São Paulo, São Paulo	
2020	Palmeiras won 6–0 on points.							
2021	(Minas Gerais) MG	**Atlético Mineiro**	4–0	Athletico Paranaense	(Paraná (state)) PR	Mineirão	Belo Horizonte, Minas Gerais	
2021	(Paraná (state)) PR	Athletico Paranaense	1–2	**Atlético Mineiro**	(Minas Gerais) MG	Arena da Baixada	Curitiba, Paraná	
2021	Atlético Mineiro won 6–0 on points.							
2022	(São Paulo (state)) SP	Corinthians	0–0	**Flamengo**	(Rio de Janeiro (state)) RJ	Neo Química Arena	São Paulo, São Paulo	
2022	(Rio de Janeiro (state)) RJ	**Flamengo**	1–1	Corinthians	(São Paulo (state)) SP	Maracanã	Rio de Janeiro, Rio de Janeiro	
2022	Tied 2–2 on points and equal on goal difference, Flamengo won 6–5 on penalties. *							
2023	(Rio de Janeiro (state)) RJ	Flamengo	0–1	**São Paulo**	(São Paulo (state)) SP	Maracanã	Rio de Janeiro, Rio de Janeiro	
2023	(São Paulo (state)) SP	**São Paulo**	1–1	Flamengo	(Rio de Janeiro (state)) RJ	Morumbi	São Paulo, São Paulo	
2023	São Paulo won 4–1 on points.							
2024	(Rio de Janeiro (state)) RJ	**Flamengo**	3–1	Atlético Mineiro	(Minas Gerais) MG	Maracanã	Rio de Janeiro, Rio de Janeiro	
2024	(Minas Gerais) MG	Atlético Mineiro	0–1	**Flamengo**	(Rio de Janeiro (state)) RJ	Arena MRV	Belo Horizonte, Minas Gerais	
2024	Flamengo won 6–0 on points.							
2025	(São Paulo (state)) SP	**Corinthians**	0–0	Vasco da Gama	(Rio de Janeiro (state)) RJ	Neo Química Arena	São Paulo, São Paulo	
2025	(Rio de Janeiro (state)) RJ	Vasco da Gama	1–2	**Corinthians**	(São Paulo (state)) SP	Maracanã	Rio de Janeiro, Rio de Janeiro	
2025	Corinthians won 4–1 on points.							
Single match format (2026-present)
Year	State	Winners	Score	Runners-up	State	Venue	Location	Refs
2026	(Rio Grande do Sul) RS	Grêmio		Palmeiras	(São Paulo (state)) SP	Mané Garrincha	Brasília, District Federal	

== Performance by club ==
Team	Winner	Runner-up	Years won	Years runner-up
(Minas Gerais) Cruzeiro	6	2	1993, 1996, 2000, 2003, 2017, 2018	1998, 2014
(Rio de Janeiro (state)) Flamengo	5	5	1990, 2006, 2013, 2022, 2024	1997, 2003, 2004, 2017, 2023
(Rio Grande do Sul) Grêmio	5	4	1989, 1994, 1997, 2001, 2016	1991, 1993, 1995, 2020
(São Paulo (state)) Corinthians	4	4	1995, 2002, 2009, 2025	2001, 2008, 2018, 2022
(São Paulo (state)) Palmeiras	4	1	1998, 2012, 2015, 2020	1996
(Minas Gerais) Atlético Mineiro	2	2	2014, 2021	2016, 2024
(Rio Grande do Sul) Internacional	1	2	1992	2009, 2019
(Rio de Janeiro (state)) Fluminense	1	2	2007	1992, 2005
(Rio de Janeiro (state)) Vasco da Gama	1	2	2011	2006, 2025
(Paraná (state)) Athletico Paranaense	1	2	2019	2013, 2021
(Pernambuco) Sport	1	1	2008	1989
(São Paulo (state)) Santos	1	1	2010	2015
(São Paulo (state)) São Paulo	1	1	2023	2000
(Santa Catarina (state)) Criciúma	1	0	1991	—
(Rio Grande do Sul) Juventude	1	0	1999	—
(São Paulo (state)) Santo André	1	0	2004	—
(São Paulo (state)) Paulista	1	0	2005	—
(Paraná (state)) Coritiba	0	2	—	2011, 2012
Goiás	0	1	—	1990
Ceará	0	1	—	1994
(Rio de Janeiro (state)) Botafogo	0	1	—	1999
(Federal District (Brazil)) Brasiliense	0	1	—	2002
(Santa Catarina (state)) Figueirense	0	1	—	2007
(Bahia) Vitória	0	1	—	2010

== Performance by state ==
State	Winners	Runners-up	Winning clubs	Runners-up
São Paulo	12	7	Corinthians (4), Palmeiras (4), Paulista (1), Santo André (1), Santos (1), São Paulo (1)	Corinthians (4), Palmeiras (1), Santos (1), São Paulo (1)
Minas Gerais	8	4	Cruzeiro (6), Atlético Mineiro (2)	Cruzeiro (2), Atlético Mineiro (2)
Rio de Janeiro	7	10	Flamengo (5), Fluminense (1), Vasco da Gama (1)	Flamengo (5), Fluminense (2), Vasco da Gama (2), Botafogo (1)
Rio Grande do Sul	7	6	Grêmio (5), Internacional (1), Juventude (1)	Grêmio (4), Internacional (2)
Paraná	1	4	Athletico Paranaense (1)	Coritiba (2), Athletico Paranaense (2)
Pernambuco	1	1	Sport (1)	Sport (1)
Santa Catarina	1	1	Criciúma (1)	Figueirense (1)
Bahia	0	1	—	Vitória (1)
Ceará	0	1	—	Ceará (1)
Distrito Federal	0	1	—	Brasiliense (1)
Goiás	0	1	—	Goiás (1)
