= Auto Esporte Clube (PI) =

Auto Esporte Clube do Piauí
- Full name: Auto Esporte Clube do Piauí
- Nickname(s): Calhambeque; Alviverde da Rua Clodoaldo Freitas
- Founded: May 1, 1951 (73 years ago)
- Ground: Albertão
- Capacity: 60,000
Home colors	Away colors

Auto Esporte Clube do Piauí, commonly known as Auto Esporte, are a Brazilian football team from Teresina. They won the Campeonato Piauiense once and competed in the Série A once.

== History ==
They were founded on May 1, 1951, by self-employed car drivers. The club won the Campeonato Piauiense in 1983. Auto Esporte competed in the Série A in 1984, when they were eliminated in the Repescagem stage by Joinville, of Santa Catarina.

== Stadium ==
They play their home games at the Lindolfinho stadium. The stadium has a maximum capacity of 8,000 people.

== Anthem ==
Auto Esporte, Auto Esporte

Luta com muito amor

Eu vou com o alviverde

Para onde ele for

É com amor e alegria

Que a gente vai torcer

Eu levo minha bandeira verde e branco

Para todo mundo ver

Eu sou alviverde

E alviverde hei de ser

Eu sou Auto Esporte

Auto Esporte até morrer

A cidade toda vibra

Gritando “campeão, campeão”

Viva o calhambeque

Que explode o nosso coração

Nós vamos dizer todos irão

Do Piauí o Auto Esporte é campeão

== Honours ==
- Campeonato Piauiense
  - Winners (1): 1983
- Campeonato Piauiense Second Division
  - Winners (2): 1966, 1978
- Torneio Início do Piauí
  - Winners (3): 1954, 1963, 1990
