= Carlinhos (footballer, born November 1986) =

Brazilian footballer

Personal information
- Full name: Carlos Emiliano Pereira
- Date of birth: 29 November 1986 (age 39)
- Place of birth: Piripiri, Piauí, Brazil
- Height: 1.67 m (5 ft 5 1/2 in)
- Position: Left back

Youth career
- 2003–2004: 4 de Julho

Senior career*
Years	Team	Apps	(Gls)
2004–2008	4 de Julho		
2007	→ Picos (loan)		
2008–2009	Barras	13	(0)
2009–2013	Icasa	108	(7)
2011	→ Guarani (loan)	22	(1)
2013	→ Atlético Sorocaba (loan)	15	(2)
2013–2017	Coritiba	121	(4)
2017	Goiás	32	(1)
2018	América Mineiro	35	(2)
2019–2021	Fortaleza	74	(2)
2021	→ Botafogo (loan)	16	(1)
2022	Botafogo	3	(1)
- * Club domestic league appearances and goals as of 3 February 2022

Carlos Emiliano Pereira (born 29 November 1986), commonly known as Carlinhos, is a Brazilian footballer who plays as a left back.

== Honours ==
Botafogo

- Campeonato Brasileiro Série B: 2021

Icasa

- Campeonato Cearense Série B: 2010

Coritiba

- Campeonato Paranaense: 2017

Fortaleza

- Campeonato Cearense: 2019, 2020, 2021
- Copa do Nordeste: 2019
