= Fluminense Esporte Clube =

Brazilian football club

Fluminense
- Full name: Fluminense Esporte Clube
- Nickname: Tricolor do Piauí (Tricolor of Piaui)
- Founded: 31 January 1938; 88 years ago
- Ground: Estádio Lindolfo Monteiro
- Capacity: 5,144
- President: Rossini de Sousa Lima
- Head coach: Marcelo Vilar
- League: Campeonato Brasileiro Série D Campeonato Piauiense
- 2025: Piauiense, 2nd of 8
- Website: http://www.fluminenseesporteclube.com.br/
Home colours	Away colours

Fluminense Esporte Clube, commonly known as Fluminense-PI or just Fluminense, is a Brazilian football club based in Teresina, Piauí. Founded in 1938, the club plays in the Campeonato Brasileiro Série D, as well as the Campeonato Piauiense.

== History ==
Founded on 31 January 1938 as Automóvel Esporte Clube, the club was renamed Fluminense Esporte Clube in 1948 as the state already had a Flamengo and a Botafogo. The club won the second division in 1967, and played senior football until 1977.

Fluminense returned to senior competitions in 2003, playing one second division before being again exclusive to the youth categories. The club attempted a return to the second level in 2019, but gave up from playing shortly after, only returning in 2020 and winning the second division.

In the 2021 Campeonato Piauiense, Fluminense reached the finals but lost the title to Altos. In 2022, the club won their first ever Piauiense title, after defeating Parnahyba in the finals.

== Honours ==
- Campeonato Piauiense
  - Winners (1): 2022
  - Runners-up (3): 2021, 2023, 2025
- Campeonato Piauiense Second Division
  - Winners (2): 1967, 2020
