= Fernando Roberto =

Brazilian footballer

Personal information
- Full name: Fernando Roberto
- Date of birth: 27 June 1956 (age 70)
- Place of birth: Belo Horizonte, Brazil
- Position: Forward

Senior career*
Years	Team	Apps	(Gls)
1977–1979	América Mineiro		
1979–1982	Atlético Mineiro		
1982	América-SP		
1982	Internacional		
1983	Sport Recife		
1983	Taquaritinga		
1983–1984	América-SP		
1984–1985	Uberlândia		
1986	Operário-MS		
1987	Vitória		
1987	Bandeirante		
1988	Fortaleza		
1989	Ríver-PI		
1990	Jorge Wilstermann		
- * Club domestic league appearances and goals as of 19 March 2024

Fernando Roberto (born 27 June 1956), is a Brazilian former professional footballer who played as a forward.

== Career ==
Center forward, Fernando Roberto received the nickname "Mastiguinha" due to his habit of always chewing gum on the field. He had great spells at América and Atlético Mineiro, where he became state champion three times, and at Ríver where he won the state championship in 1989. He ended his career at Jorge Wilstermann in Cochabamba.

== Honours ==
Atlético Mineiro

- Campeonato Mineiro: 1980, 1981, 1982

Ríver

- Campeonato Piauiense: 1989

Individual

- 1979 Campeonato Mineiro top scorer: 16 goals
