= Campeonato Piauiense Second Division =

Football league in Piauí, Brazil

- Organising body: FFP
- Founded: 1957; 69 years ago
- Country: Brazil
- State: Piauí
- Level on pyramid: 2
- Promotion to: Campeonato Piauiense
- Current champions: Ríver (1st title) (2026)
- Most championships: Seven teams (2 titles)
- Website: FFP Official website

The Campeonato Piauiense Second Division is the second tier of the professional state football league in the Brazilian state of Piauí. It is run by the Piauí Football Federation (FFP).

== List of champions ==
Season	Champions	Runners-up
1957	Piauí (1)	
1958–1960	Not held	
1961	Rio Negro (1)	
1962	Not held	
1963	Caiçara (1)	
1964	Ferroviário (F) (1)	
1965	Botafogo (1)	
1966	Auto Esporte (1)	
1967	Fluminense (1)	
1968–1977	Not held	
1978	Auto Esporte (2)	
1979–2002	Not held	
2003	4 de Julho (1)	Oeiras
2004	Comercial (1)	Oeiras
2005	Barras (1)	Flamengo
2006	Not held	
2007	Picos (1)	Caiçara
2008–2014	Not held	
2015	Altos (1)	Picos
2016	4 de Julho (2)	Comercial
2017–2018	Not held	
2019	Picos (2)	Timon
2020	Fluminense (2)	Tiradentes
2021	Oeirense (1)	Cori-Sabbá
2022	Comercial (2)	Ferroviário (P)
2023	Oeirense (2)	Picos
2024	Piauí (2)	Atlético Piauiense
2025	Cori-Sabbá (1)	Teresina
2026	Ríver (1)	Flamengo

== Titles by team ==
Teams in bold stills active.

Rank	Club	Winners	Winning years
1	**4 de Julho**	2	2003, 2016
1	Auto Esporte	2	1966, 1978
1	**Comercial**	2	2004, 2022
1	**Fluminense**	2	1967, 2020
1	**Oeirense**	2	2021, 2023
1	**Piauí**	2	1957, 2024
1	**Picos**	2	2007, 2019
8	**Altos**	1	2015
8	Barras	1	2005
8	Botafogo	1	1965
8	**Caiçara**	1	1963
8	**Cori-Sabbá**	1	2025
8	Ferroviário	1	1964
8	Rio Negro	1	1961
8	**Ríver**	1	2026

=== By city ===
City	Championships	Clubs
Teresina	9	Auto Esporte (2), Fluminense (2), Piauí (2), Botafogo (1), Rio Negro (1), Ríver (1)
Campo Maior	3	Comercial (2), Caiçara (1)
Floriano	2	Cori-Sabbá (1), Ferroviário (1)
Oeiras	2	Oeirense (2)
Picos	2	Picos (2)
Piripiri	2	4 de Julho (2)
Altos	1	Altos (1)
Barras	1	Barras (1)
