= Rafael Araújo =

Rafael de Araújo or Rafael Araújo may refer to:

- Rafael Araújo (basketball) (born 1980), Brazilian basketball player
- Rafael Araújo (footballer, born 1984), Brazilian football defender
- Rafael Araújo (volleyball) (born 1991), Brazilian volleyball player
- Rafael Araujo-Lopes (born 1996), American football wide receiver
