= Associação Atlética Rioverdense =

Rioverdense
- Full name: Associação Atlética Rioverdense
- Nickname(s): Tricolor do Cerrado
- Founded: April 12, 1985
- Ground: Estádio Mozart Veloso do Carmo, Rio Verde, Goiás state, Brazil
- Capacity: 8,000
Home colors	Away colors

Associação Atlética Rioverdense, commonly known as Rioverdense, is a Brazilian football club based in Rio Verde, Goiás state. They competed in the Série C once.

== History ==
The club was founded on April 12, 1985. The club finished as Campeonato Goiano runners-up in 1998 and in 2005. They competed in the Série C in 1998, when they were eliminated in the First Stage of the competition.

== Stadium ==
Associação Atlética Rioverdense play their home games at Estádio Mozart Veloso do Carmo. The stadium has a maximum capacity of 8,000 people.
