= Botafogo Esporte Clube =

Botafogo
- Full name: Botafogo Esporte Clube
- Founded: 1932
- Ground: Lindolfinho, Teresina, Piauí state, Brazil
- Capacity: 8,000
Home colours	Away colours

Botafogo Esporte Clube, commonly known as Botafogo, was a Brazilian football team based in Teresina, Piauí state. They won the Campeonato Piauiense eleven times.

== History ==
The club was founded in 1930. They won the Campeonato Piauiense eleven times, and the Campeonato Piauiense Second Level in 1965.

== Honours ==
- Campeonato Piauiense
  - Winners (11): 1934, 1935, 1936, 1937, 1938, 1940, 1941, 1945, 1946, 1949, 1957
  - Runners-up (10): 1942, 1944, 1948, 1951, 1953, 1954, 1955, 1956, 1958, 1959
- Campeonato Piauiense Second Division
  - Winners (1): 1965
- Torneio Início do Piauí
  - Winners (3): 1956, 1957, 1958

== Stadium ==
Botafogo Esporte Clube played their home games at Estádio Lindolfo Monteiro, nicknamed Lindolfinho. The stadium has a maximum capacity of 8,000 people.
