= 1998 Copa do Brasil =

Copa do Brasil 1998

Tournament details
- Country: Brazil
- Dates: January 20 - May 30
- Teams: 42

Final positions
- Champions: Palmeiras (SP)
- Runners-up: Cruzeiro (MG)

Tournament statistics
- Matches played: 75
- Goals scored: 233 (3.11 per match)
- Top goal scorer: Romário (7)

The Copa do Brasil 1998 was the 10th staging of the Copa do Brasil.

The competition started on January 20, 1998, and concluded on May 30, 1998, with the second leg of the final, held at the Estádio do Morumbi in São Paulo, in which Palmeiras lifted the trophy for the first time with a 2–0 victory over Cruzeiro.

Romário, of Flamengo, with 7 goals, was the competition's topscorer.

== Format ==
The preliminary round was disputed by 20 clubs, while the first stage was disputed by 32 clubs, including the ones qualified from the preliminary stage. The competition was disputed in a knock-out format. In the preliminary stage and in the first round if the away team won the first leg with an advantage of at least two goals, the second leg was not played and the club automatically qualified to the next round. The following rounds were played over two legs and the away goals rule was used.

== Competition stages ==
=== Preliminary round ===
Team 1	Agg.	Team 2	1st leg	2nd leg
ABC (RN)	1-4	Fluminense (RJ)	1-4	-
Ji-Paraná (RO)	2-5	América (MG)	2-3	0-2
Villa Nova (MG)	5-6	Santos (SP)	3-4	2-2
Operário (MS)	0-4	Flamengo (RJ)	0-0	0-4
Remo (PA)	2-5	Portuguesa (SP)	2-0	0-5
Amapá (AP)	3-3	Baré (RR)	1-1	2-2
CSA (AL)	0-4	Palmeiras (SP)	0-1	0-3
Vila Nova (GO)	2-1	Coritiba (PR)	2-1	0-0
Linhares (ES)	1-1	América (RN)	0-0	1-1
Avaí (SC)	2-6	Atlético (MG)	1-1	1-5

=== Knockout stages ===
1st Round
1	Alvorada (TO)	1 0
32	Atlético (MG)	2 7
17	Fluminense (RJ)	0
16	Paraná (PR)	2
9	Goiás (GO)	2
24	Santos (SP)	5
25	Botafogo (PB)	2 2
8	Bahia (BA)	3 1
5	São Raimundo (AM)	0 0
28	Botafogo (RJ)	1 4
21	Ceará (CE)	1 0
12	Palmeiras (SP)	1 6
13	Portuguesa (SP)	2 2
20	Sport (PE)	1 4
29	América (MG)	1 0 (pen: 4)
4	Internacional (RS)	0 1 (pen: 2)
3	Gama (DF)	2
30	Flamengo (RJ)	4
19	Operário (MT)	2 1
14	Vitória (BA)	2 3
11	Amapá (AP)	1
22	Cruzeiro (MG)	7
27	Itabaiana (SE)	0
6	Corinthians (SP)	3
7	Rio Branco (AC)	0
26	Vila Nova (GO)	2
23	Picos (PI)	1 0
10	Vasco (RJ)	1 8
15	Sampaio Corrêa (MA)	0 0
18	São Paulo (SP)	0 4
31	Linhares (ES)	0 0
2	Grêmio (RS)	0 2

2nd Round
Atlético (MG)	1 0
Paraná (PR)	1 1
Santos (SP)	3 5
Bahia (BA)	3 2
Botafogo (RJ)	2 0
Palmeiras (SP)	1 1
Sport (PE)	3 2
América (MG)	3 1
Flamengo (RJ)	2 0
Vitória (BA)	5 5
Cruzeiro (MG)	3 1
Corinthians (SP)	1 1
Vila Nova (GO)	0 0
Vasco (RJ)	0 2
São Paulo (SP)	2 2
Grêmio (RS)	0 0

Quarterfinals
Paraná (PR)	0 0
Santos (SP)	1 1
Palmeiras (SP)	2 1
Sport (PE)	0 1
Vitória (BA)	0 1
Cruzeiro (MG)	2 0
Vasco (RJ)	1 4
São Paulo (SP)	1 3

Semifinals
Santos (SP)	1 2
Palmeiras (SP)	1 2
Cruzeiro (MG)	2 0
Vasco (RJ)	0 0

Finals
Palmeiras (SP)	1 2
Cruzeiro (MG)	1 1

Copa do Brasil
1998 Winners
Palmeiras
First Title
