= 1998 Campeonato Brasileiro Série C =

Campeonato Brasileiro Série C
- Season: 1998
- Champions: Avaí
- Promoted: Avaí; São Caetano
- Matches: 388
- Goals: 1,034 (2.66 per match)
- Biggest home win: Confiança 7-0 Treze (August 9, 1998); Anapolina 7-0 Alvorada (August 16, 1998); Ferroviário 7-0 Cori-Sabbá (September 28, 1998)
- Biggest away win: Alvorada 0-5 Anapolna (September 27, 1998)
- Highest scoring: Ferroviário 4-7 Fortaleza (September 6, 1998)

The football (soccer) Campeonato Brasileiro Série C 1998, the third level of Brazilian National League, was played from August 8 to December 6, 1998. The competition had 66 clubs (Note: Itumbiara was originally placed in Group 5. After playing three matches, Itumbiara was excluded from the competition for not paying referee fees.) and two of them were promoted to Série B.

== Stages of the competition ==
=== First phase ===
==== Group 1 ====
Pos	Team	Pld	W	D	L	GF	GA	GD	Pts	Qualification
1	(Amazonas (Brazilian state)) São Raimundo	10	6	2	2	14	10	+4	20	Qualified for the second phase
2	(Pará) Vênus	10	6	1	3	17	13	+4	19	Qualified for the second phase
3	(Pará) São Francisco-PA	10	6	1	3	16	12	+4	19	Qualified for the second phase
4	(Amazonas (Brazilian state)) Nacional-AM	10	5	1	4	18	14	+4	16	
5	(Roraima) Baré	10	2	4	4	10	12	−2	10	
6	(Amapá) Santos-AP	10	0	1	9	2	16	−14	1	

Source: rsssf.com

==== Group 2 ====
Pos	Team	Pld	W	D	L	GF	GA	GD	Pts	Qualification
1	(Maranhão) Moto Club	10	5	3	2	14	9	+5	18	Qualified for the second phase
2	(Maranhão) Viana	10	5	2	3	16	9	+7	17	Qualified for the second phase
3	(Piauí) Picos	10	3	6	1	12	10	+2	15	Qualified for the second phase
4	(Ceará) Ferroviário-CE	10	3	4	3	20	17	+3	13	
5	(Ceará) Fortaleza	10	3	4	3	18	15	+3	13	
6	(Piauí) Cori-Sabbá	10	0	3	7	7	27	−20	3	

Source: rsssf.com

==== Group 3 ====
Pos	Team	Pld	W	D	L	GF	GA	GD	Pts	Qualification
1	(Ceará) Limoeiro	10	5	1	4	17	18	−1	16	Qualified for the second phase
2	(Rio Grande do Norte) Potiguar	10	4	4	2	15	9	+6	16	Qualified for the second phase
3	(Bahia) Juazeiro	10	4	3	3	14	12	+2	15	Qualified for the second phase
4	(Ceará) Icasa	10	4	3	3	11	9	+2	15	
5	(Paraíba) Campinense	10	2	4	4	16	17	−1	10	
6	(Rio Grande do Norte) Baraúnas	10	1	5	4	10	18	−8	8	

Source: rsssf.com

==== Group 4 ====
Pos	Team	Pld	W	D	L	GF	GA	GD	Pts	Qualification
1	(Sergipe) Itabaiana	10	6	1	3	14	10	+4	19	Qualified for the second phase
2	(Paraíba) Botafogo-PB	10	5	1	4	18	13	+5	16	Qualified for the second phase
3	(Sergipe) Confiança	10	5	0	5	18	15	+3	15	Qualified for the second phase
4	(Bahia) Catuense	10	4	2	4	13	14	−1	14	
5	(Alagoas) CSA	10	4	0	6	11	13	−2	12	
6	(Paraíba) Treze	10	3	2	5	11	20	−9	11	

Source: rsssf.com

==== Group 5 ====
Pos	Team	Pld	W	D	L	GF	GA	GD	Pts	Qualification
1	(Goiás) Anapolina	8	6	1	1	22	4	+18	19	Qualified for the second phase
2	(Goiás) Anápolis	8	4	1	3	9	7	+2	13	Qualified for the second phase
3	(Goiás) Goiânia	8	3	2	3	11	9	+2	11	
4	(Tocantins) Alvorada	8	2	2	4	6	21	−15	8	
5	(Tocantins) Palmas	8	0	4	4	8	15	−7	4	

Source: rsssf.com

==== Group 6 ====
Pos	Team	Pld	W	D	L	GF	GA	GD	Pts	Qualification
1	(São Paulo (state)) América-SP	10	8	1	1	27	9	+18	25	Qualified for the second phase
2	(São Paulo (state)) Noroeste	10	5	2	3	13	10	+3	17	Qualified for the second phase
3	(Mato Grosso do Sul) Comercial-MS	10	5	0	5	18	18	0	15	Qualified for the second phase
4	(Goiás) Rioverdense	10	3	3	4	11	12	−1	12	
5	(Paraná (state)) Paranavaí	10	3	3	4	9	14	−5	12	
6	(Mato Grosso do Sul) Ubiratan	10	0	3	7	2	17	−15	3	

Source: rsssf.com

==== Group 7 ====
Pos	Team	Pld	W	D	L	GF	GA	GD	Pts	Qualification
1	(Minas Gerais) Tupi	10	5	3	2	14	9	+5	18	Qualified for the second phase
2	(Minas Gerais) Villa Nova	10	4	3	3	13	9	+4	15	Qualified for the second phase
3	(Rio de Janeiro (state)) América-RJ	10	4	2	4	12	14	−2	14	Qualified for the second phase
4	(Rio de Janeiro (state)) Friburguense	10	3	4	3	12	13	−1	13	
5	(Espírito Santo) Rio Branco-ES	10	2	4	4	9	10	−1	10	
6	(Rio de Janeiro (state)) Campo Grande	10	2	4	4	12	17	−5	10	

Source: rsssf.com

==== Group 8 ====
Pos	Team	Pld	W	D	L	GF	GA	GD	Pts	Qualification
1	(São Paulo (state)) Mogi Mirim	10	6	2	2	14	8	+6	20	Qualified for the second phase
2	(Minas Gerais) Rio Branco-MG	10	5	4	1	10	6	+4	19	Qualified for the second phase
3	(São Paulo (state)) Atlético Sorocaba	10	5	1	4	13	9	+4	16	Qualified for the second phase
4	(São Paulo (state)) Nacional-SP	10	4	4	2	9	6	+3	16	
5	(Rio de Janeiro (state)) Madureira	10	0	6	4	7	15	−8	6	
6	(Rio de Janeiro (state)) CFZ-RJ	10	1	1	8	4	13	−9	4	

Source: rsssf.com

==== Group 9 ====
Pos	Team	Pld	W	D	L	GF	GA	GD	Pts	Qualification
1	(São Paulo (state)) São Caetano	10	8	2	0	15	3	+12	26	Qualified for the second phase
2	(São Paulo (state)) Santo André	10	5	2	3	14	10	+4	17	Qualified for the second phase
3	(São Paulo (state)) Rio Branco-SP	10	4	5	1	18	11	+7	17	Qualified for the second phase
4	(São Paulo (state)) Matonense	10	3	2	5	11	14	−3	11	
5	(São Paulo (state)) Etti Jundiaí	10	2	2	6	11	16	−5	8	
6	(São Paulo (state)) Francana	10	1	1	8	7	22	−15	4	

Source: rsssf.com

==== Group 10 ====
Pos	Team	Pld	W	D	L	GF	GA	GD	Pts	Qualification
1	(Rio Grande do Sul) Caxias	10	4	5	1	19	9	+10	17	Qualified for the second phase
2	(Santa Catarina (state)) Figueirense	10	4	3	3	15	17	−2	15	Qualified for the second phase
3	(Rio Grande do Sul) São José-RS	10	3	6	1	12	10	+2	15	Qualified for the second phase
4	(Paraná (state)) União Bandeirante	10	3	4	3	15	13	+2	13	
5	(Paraná (state)) Rio Branco-PR	10	3	3	4	15	16	−1	12	
6	(Santa Catarina (state)) Blumenau	10	1	3	6	11	22	−11	6	

Source: rsssf.com

==== Group 11 ====
Pos	Team	Pld	W	D	L	GF	GA	GD	Pts	Qualification
1	(Santa Catarina (state)) Avaí	10	6	1	3	22	13	+9	19	Qualified for the second phase
2	(Rio Grande do Sul) Brasil de Pelotas	10	6	1	3	16	7	+9	19	Qualified for the second phase
3	(Rio Grande do Sul) 15 de Novembro	10	6	0	4	19	17	+2	18	Qualified for the second phase
4	(Rio Grande do Sul) Pelotas	10	5	1	4	16	13	+3	16	
5	(Santa Catarina (state)) Tubarão	10	2	2	6	13	21	−8	8	
6	(Santa Catarina (state)) Chapecoense	10	1	3	6	11	26	−15	6	

Source: rsssf.com

=== Second phase ===
Team 1	Agg.	Team 2	1st leg	2nd leg
São Raimundo	1–1(p)	São Francisco	1–1	0–0
Vênus	0–4	Moto Club	0–0	0–4
Limoeiro	5–2	Picos	3–1	2–1
Confiança	3–2	Botafogo-PB	3–1	0–1
Juazeiro	1–3	Itabaiana	1–1	0–2
Viana	2–2(p)	Potiguar	1–1	1–1
Rio Branco-SP	5–1	Villa Nova	3–0	2–1
Comercial-MS	3–6	Anapolina	3–3	0–3
Tupi	0–1	Santo André	0–0	0–1
Anápolis	2–0	América-SP	2–0	0–0
Rio Branco-MG	3–4	Noroeste	1–2	2–2
Atlético Sorocaba	2–3	América-RJ	2–0	0–3
Mogi Mirim	3–4	15 de Novembro	2–2	1–2
São José	1–4	São Caetano	0–2	1–2
Caxias	3–4	Avaí	3–2	0–2
Figueirense	1–3	Brasil de Pelotas	0–1	1–2

=== Round of 16 ===
Team 1	Agg.	Team 2	1st leg	2nd leg
Limoeiro	4–3	Confiança	3–1	1–2
São Caetano	4–1	Anápolis	1–0	3–1
Anapolina	4–1	América-RJ	2–0	2–1
Avaí	5–1	Santo André	4–0	1–1
Brasil de Pelotas	4–3	Noroeste	1–0	3–3
Rio Branco-SP	4–4(p)	15 de Novembro	2–2	2–2
São Raimundo	4–2	Moto Club	3–0	1–2
Itabaiana	3–2	Potiguar	2–0	1–2

=== Quarterfinals ===
Team 1	Agg.	Team 2	1st leg	2nd leg
São Caetano	3–1	Rio Branco-SP	2–0	1–1
Brasil de Pelotas	4–4(p)	Avaí	2–2	2–2
Anapolina	6–1	Limoeiro	5–0	1–1
Itabaiana	3–3(p)	São Raimundo	2–1	1–1

=== Final stage ===
Pos	Team	Pld	W	D	L	GF	GA	GD	Pts	AVA	SCA	ANA	ITB
1	Avaí (P)	6	2	3	1	8	7	+1	9		2–1	0–0	1–1
2	São Caetano (P)	6	2	2	2	4	5	−1	8	1–0		0–0	0–0
3	Anapolina	6	1	4	1	8	5	+3	7	3–3	1–2		5–0
4	Itabaiana	6	1	3	2	5	8	−3	6	1–2	3–0	0–0	

Source: rsssf.com
(P) Promoted to Série B 1999

== Sources ==
- "Brazil Third Level 1998". rsssfbrasil.com. Archived from the original on 2020-01-04.
