= 1991 Copa do Brasil =

Copa do Brasil 1991

Tournament details
- Country: Brazil
- Dates: February 9 - June 2
- Teams: 32

Final positions
- Champions: Criciúma (SC)
- Runners-up: Grêmio (RS)

Tournament statistics
- Matches played: 62
- Goals scored: 132 (2.13 per match)
- Top goal scorer: Gérson da Silva (6)

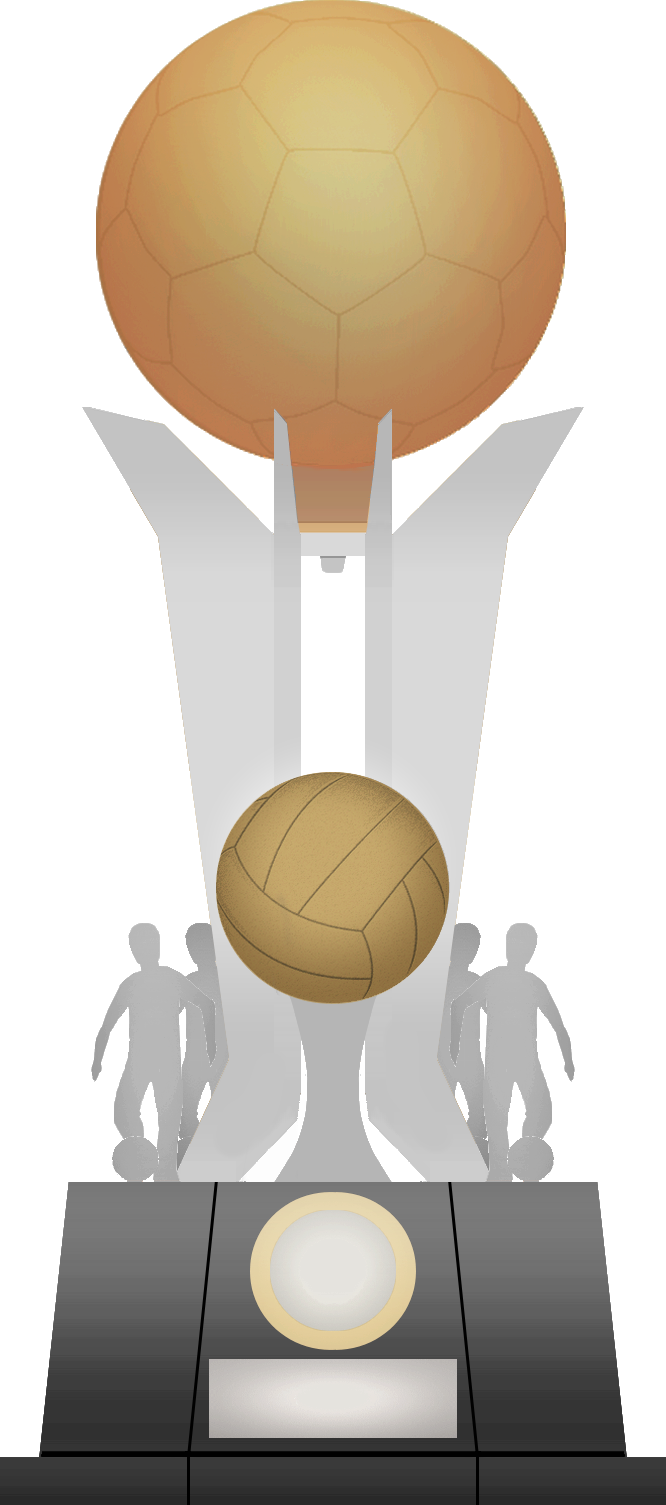
1991 Brazil Cup Trophy

The Copa do Brasil 1991 was the 3rd staging of the Copa do Brasil.

The competition started on February 9, 1991, and concluded on June 2, 1991, with the second leg of the final, held at the Estádio Heriberto Hülse in Criciúma. Criciúma lifted the trophy for the first time after a 0–0 draw with Grêmio.

Only one first-division team, Grêmio, was in the semi-finals, and they were relegated after the 1991 season, while none of the other semi-finalists achieved promotion to Série A. This creates a unique situation where all four semi-finalists of the cup played in the second division the following year.

Gérson, of Atlético Mineiro, with six goals, was the competition's top scorer.

== Format ==
The competition was contested by 32 clubs in a knock-out format where all rounds were played in two legs, and the away goals rule was used.

== Competition stages ==
1st Round
1	Sampaio Corrêa (MA)	1 1
32	Botafogo (RJ)	2 3
17	Colatina (ES)	1 0
16	Santa Cruz (PE)	3 1
9	CSA (AL)	1 0 (pen: 1)
24	Coritiba (PR)	0 1 (pen: 3)
25	Paysandu (PA)	1 0
8	Ceará (CE)	0 0
5	Confiança (SE)	0 0
28	Corinthians (SP)	0 1
21	ABC (RN)	1 0
12	Cruzeiro (MG)	1 4
13	Auto Esporte (PB)	0 0
20	Grêmio (RS)	1 2
29	Goiânia (GO)	1 0
4	Fluminense (BA)	1 1
3	Caiçara (PI)	0 0
30	Atlético (MG)	1 11
19	Ubiratan (MS)	1 1
14	Criciúma (SC)	1 4
11	Caxias (RS)	2 1
22	XV de Piracicaba (SP)	1 1
27	União (MT)	0 0
6	Goiás (GO)	1 3
7	Atlético (PR)	1 1
26	Vitória (BA)	1 2
23	Gama (DF)	0 0
10	Sport (PE)	1 3
15	Rio Negro (AM)	1 0
18	Vasco (RJ)	1 5
31	Rio Branco (AC)	1 0
2	Remo (PA)	1 4

2nd Round
Botafogo (RJ)	1 3
Santa Cruz (PE)	0 0
Coritiba (PR)	3 0
Paysandu (PA)	0 0
Corinthians (SP)	3 1
Cruzeiro (MG)	1 0
Grêmio (RS)	1 2
Fluminense (BA)	0 0
Atlético (MG)	0 0
Criciúma (SC)	1 1
Caxias (RS)	1 0
Goiás (GO)	1 2
Vitória (BA)	2 0
Sport (PE)	1 0
Vasco (RJ)	0 1
Remo (PA)	0 1

Quarterfinals
Botafogo (RJ)	0 1
Coritiba (PR)	3 1
Corinthians (SP)	1 1
Grêmio (RS)	1 2
Criciúma (SC)	0 3
Goiás (GO)	0 0
Vitória (BA)	0 0
Remo (PA)	2 0

Semifinals
Coritiba (PR)	1 0
Grêmio (RS)	1 1
Criciúma (SC)	1 2
Remo (PA)	0 0

Finals
Grêmio (RS)	1 0
Criciúma (SC)	1 0

Copa do Brasil
1991 Winners
Criciúma
First Title
