= 1996 Copa do Brasil =

Copa do Brasil 1996

Tournament details
- Country: Brazil
- Dates: February 6 – June 16
- Teams: 40

Final positions
- Champions: Cruzeiro (MG)
- Runners-up: Palmeiras (SP)

Tournament statistics
- Matches played: 70
- Goals scored: 187 (2.67 per match)
- Top goal scorer: Luizao (8)

The Copa do Brasil 1996 was the 8th staging of the Copa do Brasil.

The competition started on February 6, 1996, and concluded on June 16, 1996, with the second leg of the final, held at the Estádio Parque Antártica in São Paulo, in which Cruzeiro lifted the trophy for the second time after a 2-1 victory over Palmeiras.

Luizão, of Palmeiras, with 8 goals, was the competition's topscorer.

== Format ==
The preliminary round was disputed by 16 clubs, while the first stage was disputed by 32 clubs, including the ones qualified from the preliminary stage. The competition was disputed in a knock-out format. In the preliminary stage and in the first round if the away team won the first leg with an advantage of at least two goals, the second leg was not played and the club automatically qualified to the next round. The following rounds were played over two legs and the away goals rule was used.

== Competition stages ==
=== Preliminary round ===
Team 1	Agg.	Team 2	1st leg	2nd leg
Ferroviário (CE)	0–3	Goiás (GO)	0–1	0–2
União Araguainense (TO)	2–2	Vila Nova (GO)	2–1	0–1
Cristal (AP)	1–4	Santa Cruz (PE)	0–1	1–3
Maranhão (MA)	1–2	Vitória (BA)	0–0	1–3
Ji–Paraná (RO)	1–4	Atlético (PR)	1–1	0–3
Roraima (RR)	1–3	Juventus (AC)	1–3	–
Nacional (AM)	1–3	América (MG)	1–3	–
Gama (DF)	1–3	Bahia (BA)	0–1	1–2

=== Knockout stages ===
1st Round
1	América (MG)	1 1
32	São Paulo (SP)	2 4
17	Operário (MT)	0
16	Internacional (RS)	2
9	Linhares (ES)	0 1
24	Flamengo (RJ)	1 4
25	Bahia (BA)	0 1
8	Coritiba (PR)	0 3
5	Santa Cruz (PB)	0
28	Vasco (RJ)	2
21	Juventus (AC)	1 0
12	Cruzeiro (MG)	1 4
13	ABC (RN)	0
20	Corinthians (SP)	4
29	Remo (PA)	1 1
4	Santa Cruz (PE)	1 0
3	Cori-Sabbá (PI)	1 0
30	Botafogo (RJ)	0 3
19	Vitória (BA)	0 0
14	Paraná (PR)	0 1
11	Sergipe (SE)	0
22	Palmeiras (SP)	8
27	Vila Nova (GO)	0 1
6	Atlético (MG)	1 4
7	Atlético (PR)	3 1
26	Santos (SP)	0 1
23	Operário (MS)	0 1
10	Grêmio (RS)	1 3
15	Goiás (GO)	2 0
18	Criciúma (SC)	1 3
31	CRB (AL)	1
2	Fluminense (RJ)	4

2nd Round
São Paulo (SP)	1
Internacional (RS)	1
Flamengo (RJ)	2 0
Coritiba (PR)	1 0
Vasco (RJ)	2 1
Cruzeiro (MG)	6 1
Corinthians (SP)	0 1
Remo (PA)	0 1
Botafogo (RJ)	0 0 (pen: 2)
Paraná (PR)	0 0 (pen: 4)
Palmeiras (SP)	2 5
Atlético (MG)	1 0
Atlético (PR)	1 0
Grêmio (RS)	1 3
Criciúma (SC)	1 3
Fluminense (RJ)	2 1

Quarterfinals
Internacional (RS)	3 1
Flamengo (RJ)	2 3
Cruzeiro (MG)	4 2
Corinthians (SP)	0 3
Paraná (PR)	0 1
Palmeiras (SP)	2 3
Grêmio (RS)	1 2
Criciúma (SC)	1 0

Semifinals
Flamengo (RJ)	1 0
Cruzeiro (MG)	1 0
Palmeiras (SP)	3 1
Grêmio (RS)	1 2

Finals
Cruzeiro (MG)	1 2
Palmeiras (SP)	1 1

Copa do Brasil
1996 Winners
Cruzeiro
Second Title
