= Albertão =

Multi-purpose stadium in Teresina, Brazil

Coordinates: 5.116°S 42.793°W

Estádio Governador Alberto Tavares Silva
- Albertão
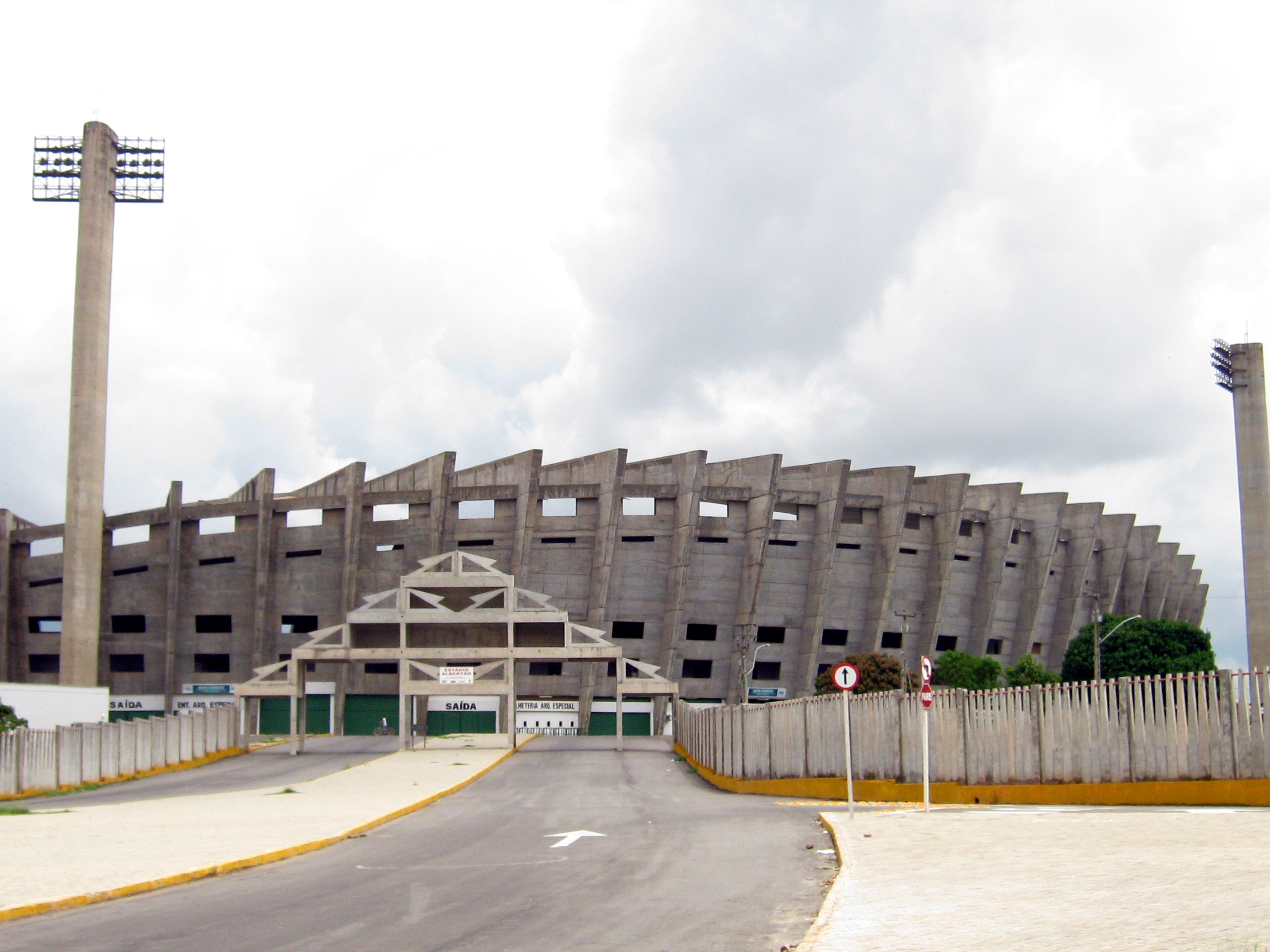
- Sisbrace
- Interactive map of Estádio Governador Alberto Tavares Silva
- Location: Teresina, Piauí, Brazil
- Owner: Piauí State Government
- Capacity: 44,200
- Surface: Grass

Construction
- Built: 1973
- Opened: 26 August 1973

Tenant
- River Atlético Clube

Estádio Governador Alberto Tavares Silva, also known as Albertão, is a multi-purpose stadium in Teresina, Brazil. It is currently used mostly for football matches and it is the home operated by River Atlético Clube and Esporte Clube Flamengo. The stadium is owned by the government of Piauí state and is named after Alberto Tavares Silva, who was governor of Piauí between 1971 and 1975.

The stadium holds 44,200 people. Due to safety concerns, maximum capacity for events at the stadium is further limited by the fire department. The limit has been increased from 13,500 to 25,000 before the 2022 season.

== History ==
It was built in 1973, and inaugurated on August 26 of that year. Eight people died during mass panic when the stadium's inauguration, which broke out when a spectator shouted that the stadium was collapsing. In reality the vibrations felt were reportedly caused by a low-flying aircraft. Although the death toll in different official reports varies, it is generally accepted that this remains the worst disaster in the history of Brazilian football.

The inaugural match was played on August 26, 1973, when Tiradentes and Fluminense drew 0-0.

The first goal of the stadium was scored on August 29, 1973, by Cruzeiro's Dirceu Lopes, when Tiradentes and Cruzeiro drew 1-1.

The stadium's attendance record currently stands at 60,271, set on March 13, 1983, when Flamengo beat Tiradentes 3–1.
