= Associação Atlética Cori-Sabbá =

Brazilian football club

Cori-Sabbá
- Full name: Associação Atlética Cori-Sabbá
- Nicknames: Águia; Cori
- Founded: May 24, 1973 (52 years ago)
- Ground: Tiberão, Floriano, Piauí state, Brazil
- Capacity: 4,500
Home colors	Away colors

Associação Atlética Cori-Sabbá, commonly known as Cori-Sabbá, is a Brazilian football club based in Floriano, Piauí state. They competed in the Série C three times.

== History ==
The club was founded on May 24, 1973, after Corinthians-PI and Auto Posto Sabbá fused. Cori-Sabbá won the Campeonato Piauiense in 1995. They were eliminated in the First Stage in the 1995, in the 1996 and in the 1998 editions of the Série C. In the 1996 Copa do Brasil, Cori-Sabbá beat Botafogo, which was the 1995 Série A champion, 1–0 in the first leg of the First Round, but it was defeated 3–0 in the second leg, thus being eliminated in that stage.

== Honours ==
- Campeonato Piauiense
  - Winners (1): 1995
  - Runners-up (2): 1996, 1998
- Campeonato Piauiense Second Division
  - Winners (1): 2025
  - Runners-up (1): 2021

== Stadium ==
Associação Atlética Cori-Sabbá play their home games at Estádio Tibério Barbosa Nunes, nicknamed Tiberão. The stadium has a maximum capacity of 4,500 people.
