= Caiçara Esporte Clube =

Caiçara
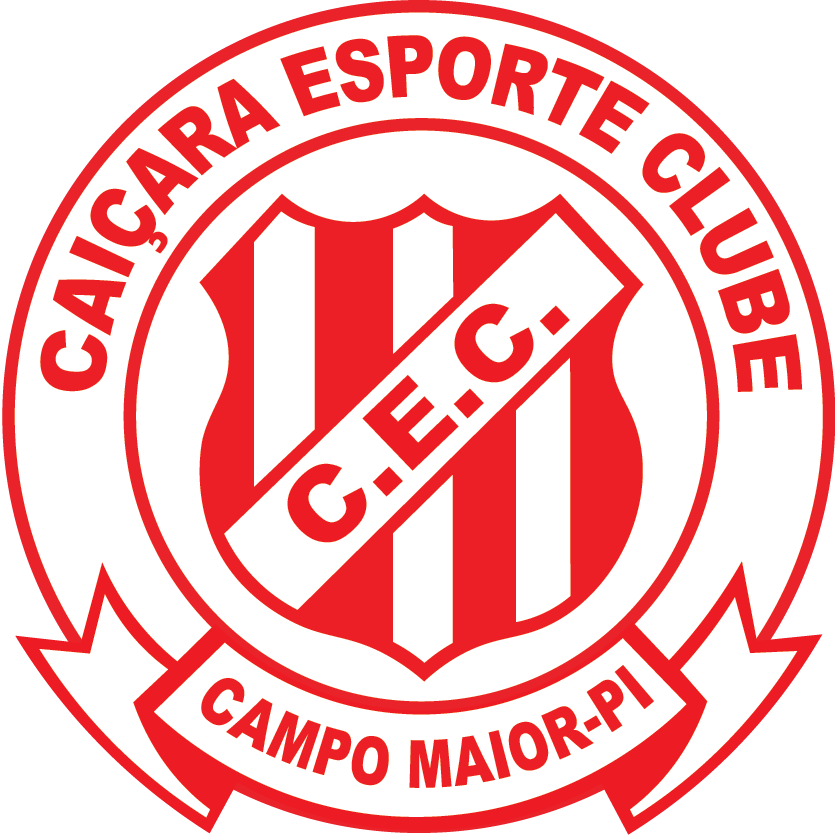
- Full name: Caiçara Esporte Clube
- Nickname: Leão da Terra dos Carnaubais
- Founded: February 27, 1954
- Ground: Estádio Deusdeth de Melo, Campo Maior
- Capacity: 4,000
Home colours	Away colours

Caiçara Esporte Clube, commonly known as Caiçara, is a Brazilian football club based in Campo Maior, Piauí state. They competed once in the Copa do Brasil.

== History ==
The club was founded on February 27, 1954 by employees of Casa Morais company and former supporters of another club of the city. Caiçara won the Campeonato Piauiense Second Level in 1963. The team finished as Campeonato Piauiense runners-up in 1963 and in 1990, and competed in the Copa do Brasil in 1991, when they were eliminated in the First Round by Atlético Mineiro. It became the first club from Piauí state to compete in a Brazilian national tournament.

== Honours ==
- Campeonato Piauiense
  - Runners-up (3): 1963, 1990, 1995
- Campeonato Piauiense Second Division
  - Winners (1): 1963

== Stadium ==
Caiçara Esporte Clube play their home games at Estádio Deusdeth de Melo. The stadium has a maximum capacity of 4,000 people.
