= Barras Futebol Club =

Barras
- Full name: Barras Futebol Club
- Nickname(s): Bafo; Leão da Maratona
- Founded: November 15, 2004
- Ground: Estádio Juca Fortes, Parnaíba, Piauí state, Brazil
- Capacity: 4,870
- President: Paulo Afonso Silva
- Website: http://www.barrasfc.com.br/
Home colours	Away colours

Barras Futebol Club, commonly known as Barras, is a Brazilian football club based in Barras, Piauí state. They competed in the Série C twice and competed in the Copa do Brasil once.

== History ==
The club was founded on November 15, 2004. Barras won the Campeonato Piauiense in 2008. They competed in the Série C in 2007, when they reached the Final Stage, finishing in the 7th position, but failing to gain promotion to the following year's Série B, and in 2008, when they were eliminated in the First Stage of the competition. Barras will play against ABC in the First Round of the 2011 Copa do Brasil.

== Honours ==
- Campeonato Piauiense
  - Winners (1): 2008
  - Runners-up (3): 2006, 2007, 2010
- Copa Piauí
  - Winners (1): 2007
- Campeonato Piauiense Second Division
  - Winners (1): 2005
- Torneio Início do Piauí
  - Winners (1): 2011

== Stadium ==
Barras Futebol Club play their home games at Estádio Juca Fortes. The stadium has a maximum capacity of 4,870 people.
