= Associação Atlética de Altos =

Brazilian association football club based in Altos, Piauí, Brazil

Altos
- Full name: Associação Atlética de Altos
- Nicknames: Jacaré (Alligator); Manga Mecânica (Mechanical Mango)
- Founded: 19 July 2013; 13 years ago
- Ground: Lindolfo Monteiro
- Capacity: 15,269
- President: Warton Lacerda
- Head coach: Jerson Testoni
- League: Campeonato Brasileiro Série D Campeonato Piauiense
- 2025 2025: Série D, 10th of 64; Piauiense, 3rd of 8
- Website: https://altosoficial.com.br/
Home colors	Away colors

Associação Atlética de Altos, commonly referred to as Altos, is a Brazilian professional club based in Altos, Piauí founded on 19 July 2013. It competes in the Campeonato Brasileiro Série D, the fourth tier of Brazilian football, as well as in the Campeonato Piauiense, the top flight of the Piauí state football league.

Altos is the top ranked team from Piauí in CBF's national club ranking, at 66th overall.

== Stadium ==
They play their home games at Estádio Felipão, with a capacity of 4,000 people.

== Honours ==
- Campeonato Piauiense
  - Winners (4): 2017, 2018, 2021, 2024
  - Runners-up (2): 2016, 2019
- Campeonato Piauiense Second Division
  - Winners (1): 2015
