= Campeonato Piauiense =

Football league of the state of Piauí, Brazil

- Organising body: FFP
- Founded: 1916; 110 years ago (as different amateur leagues); 1963; 63 years ago (as the profissional Campeonato Piauiense)
- Country: Brazil
- State: Piauí
- Level on pyramid: 1
- Relegation to: 2nd Division
- Domestic cup(s): Copa do Nordeste; Copa do Brasil
- Current champions: Piauí (7th title) (2026)
- Most championships: Ríver (32 titles)
- Website: FFP Official website

The Campeonato Piauiense is the top-flight professional state football league in the Brazilian state of Piauí. It is run by the Piauí Football Federation (FFP).

Amateurism in Piauí football came to an end in 1963 with the introduction of professionalism.

== List of champions ==
=== Liga Sportiva Parnahybana (amateur era) ===
Season	Champions
1916	Parnahyba (1)
1917	Parnahyba (2)
1918	Artístico AC (1)
1919	Parnahyba (3)
1920	Unknown
1921	International (1)
1922	Piauhy (1)
1923	Unknown
1924	Parnahyba (4)
1925	Parnahyba (5)
1926	International (2)
1927	Parnahyba (6)
1928	International (3)
1929	Parnahyba (7)
1930	Parnahyba (8)
1931	SC Fluminense (1)
1932	Unknown
1933	Unknown
1934	Unknown
1935	SC Fluminense (2)
1936	Unknown
1937	Flamengo SC (1)
1938	Flamengo SC (2)
1939	Flamengo SC (3)
1940	Parnahyba (9)

=== Liga Theresinense de Esportes Terrestres (amateur era) ===
Season	Champions
1918	Palmeiras (1)
1919	Theresinense (1)
1920	Artístico FC (1)
1921	Militar (1)
1922	Theresinense (2)
1923	Artístico FC (2)
1924	Tiradentes AC (1)
1925	Tiradentes AC (2)
1926	Tiradentes AC (3)
1927	Tiradentes AC (4)
1928	Tiradentes AC (5)
1929	Artístico FC (3)
1930	Artístico FC (4)
1931	Militar (2)
1932	Militar (3)
1933	Artístico FC (5)
1934	Botafogo (1)
1935	Botafogo (2)
1936	Botafogo (3)
1937	Botafogo (4)
1938	Botafogo (5)
1939	Flamengo (1)
1940	Botafogo (6)

=== Federação de Futebol do Piauí (amateur era) ===
Season	Champions	Runners-up
1941	Botafogo (7)	Flamengo
1942	Flamengo (2)	Botafogo
1943	Flamengo (3)	
1944	Flamengo (4)	Botafogo
1945	Botafogo (8)	
1946	Botafogo (9)	Flamengo
1947	Flamengo (5)	
1948	Ríver (1)	Botafogo
1949	Botafogo (10)	Ríver
1950	Ríver (2)	Teresinense
1951	Ríver (3)	Botafogo
1952	Ríver (4)	Sírio-Brasileiro
1953	Ríver (5)	Botafogo
1954	Ríver (6)	Botafogo
1955	Ríver (7)	Botafogo
1956	Ríver (8)	Botafogo
1957	Botafogo (11)	Ríver
1958	Ríver (9)	Botafogo
1959	Ríver (10)	Botafogo
1960	Ríver (11)	Piauí
1961	Ríver (12)	Piauí
1962	Ríver (13)	Flamengo

=== Federação de Futebol do Piauí (professional era) ===
Season	Champions	Runners-up
1963	Ríver (14)	Caiçara
1964	Flamengo (6)	Ríver
1965	Flamengo (7)	Ríver
1966	Piauí (1)	Flamengo
1967	Piauí (2)	Ríver
1968	Piauí (3)	Ríver
1968	Piauí (3)	Flamengo
1968	Piauí (3)	Comercial
1969	Piauí (4)	Ríver
1970	Flamengo (8)	Piauí
1971	Flamengo (9)	Ríver
1972	Tiradentes (1)	Ríver
1973	Ríver (15)	Tiradentes
1974	Tiradentes (2)	Ríver
1975	Ríver (16)	Flamengo
1975	Tiradentes (3)	Flamengo
1976	Flamengo (10)	Parnahyba
1977	Ríver (17)	Flamengo
1978	Ríver (18)	Piauí
1979	Flamengo (11)	Piauí
1980	Ríver (19)	Tiradentes
1981	Ríver (20)	Piauí
1982	Tiradentes (4)	Ríver
1983	Auto Esporte (1)	Tiradentes
1984	Flamengo (12)	Tiradentes
1985	Piauí (5)	Flamengo
1986	Flamengo (13)	Ríver
1987	Flamengo (14)	Piauí
1988	Flamengo (15)	4 de Julho
1989	Ríver (21)	4 de Julho
1990	Tiradentes (5)	Caiçara
1991	Picos (1)	Ríver
1992	4 de Julho (1)	Paysandu
1993	4 de Julho (2)	Flamengo
1994	Picos (2)	Flamengo
1995	Cori-Sabbá (1)	Caiçara
1996	Ríver (22)	Cori-Sabbá
1997	Picos (3)	4 de Julho
1998	Picos (4)	Cori-Sabbá
1999	Ríver (23)	4 de Julho
2000	Ríver (24)	4 de Julho
2001	Ríver (25)	Oeiras
2002	Ríver (26)	Flamengo
2003	Flamengo (16)	Parnahyba
2004	Parnahyba (10)	Ríver
2005	Parnahyba (11)	Piauí
2006	Parnahyba (12)	Barras
2007	Ríver (27)	Barras
2008	Barras (1)	Picos
2009	Flamengo (17)	Picos
2010	Comercial (1)	Barras
2011	4 de Julho (3)	Comercial
2012	Parnahyba (13)	Flamengo
2013	Parnahyba (14)	Ríver
2014	Ríver (28)	Piauí
2015	Ríver (29)	Flamengo
2016	Ríver (30)	Altos
2017	Altos (1)	Parnahyba
2018	Altos (2)	Ríver
2019	Ríver (31)	Altos
2020	4 de Julho (4)	Picos
2021	Altos (3)	Fluminense
2022	Fluminense (1)	Parnahyba
2023	Ríver (32)	Fluminense
2024	Altos (4)	Parnahyba
2025	Piauí (6)	Fluminense
2026	Piauí (7)	Atlético Piauiense

Note

1. Parnahyba played under the name of Belga SC.

== Titles by team ==
Teams in bold stills active.

Rank	Club	Winners	Winning years
1	**Ríver**	32	1948, 1950, 1951, 1952, 1953, 1954, 1955, 1956, 1958, 1959, 1960, 1961, 1962, 1963, 1973, 1975 (shared), 1977, 1978, 1980, 1981, 1989, 1996, 1999, 2000, 2001, 2002, 2007, 2014, 2015, 2016, 2019, 2023
2	**Flamengo**	17	1939 (T), 1942, 1943, 1944, 1947, 1964, 1965, 1970, 1971, 1976, 1979, 1984, 1986, 1987, 1988, 2003, 2009
3	**Parnahyba**	14	1916 (P), 1917 (P), 1919 (P), 1924 (P), 1925 (P), 1927 (P), 1929 (P), 1930 (P), 1940 (P), 2004, 2005, 2006, 2012, 2013
4	Botafogo	11	1934 (T), 1935 (T), 1936 (T), 1937 (T), 1938 (T), 1940 (T), 1941, 1945, 1946, 1949, 1957
5	**Piauí**	7	1966, 1967, 1968, 1969, 1985, 2025, 2026
6	Artístico FC	5	1920 (T), 1923 (T), 1929 (T), 1930 (T), 1933 (T)
6	**Tiradentes**	5	1972, 1974, 1975 (shared), 1982, 1990
6	Tiradentes AC	5	1924 (T), 1925 (T), 1926 (T), 1927 (T), 1928 (T)
9	**4 de Julho**	4	1992, 1993, 2011, 2020
9	**Altos**	4	2017, 2018, 2021, 2024
9	**Picos**	4	1991, 1994, 1997, 1998
12	Flamengo SC	3	1937 (P), 1938 (P), 1939 (P)
12	International	3	1921 (P), 1926 (P), 1928 (P)
12	Militar	3	1921 (T), 1931 (T), 1932 (T)
15	SC Fluminense	2	1931 (P), 1935 (P)
15	Theresinense	2	1919 (T), 1922 (T)
17	Artístico AC	1	1918 (P)
17	Auto Esporte	1	1983
17	Barras	1	2008
17	**Comercial**	1	2010
17	**Cori-Sabbá**	1	1995
17	**Fluminense**	1	2022
17	Palmeiras	1	1918 (T)
17	Piauhy	1	1922 (P)

=== By city ===
City	Championships	Clubs
Teresina	90	Ríver (32), Flamengo (17), Botafogo (11), Piauí (7), Artístico FC (5), Tiradentes (5), Tiradentes AC (5), Militar (3), Theresinense (2), Auto Esporte (1), Fluminense (1), Palmeiras (1)
Parnaíba	24	Parnahyba (14), Flamengo SC (3), International (3), SC Fluminense (2), Artístico AC (1), Piauhy (1)
Altos	4	Altos (4)
Picos	4	Picos (4)
Piripiri	4	4 de Julho (4)
Barras	1	Barras (1)
Campo Maior	1	Comercial (1)
Floriano	1	Cori-Sabbá (1)
