= Piauí Esporte Clube =

Brazilian football team

Piauí
- Full name: Piauí Esporte Clube
- Nickname: Enxuga-Rato (Rat-Dryer)
- Founded: 15 August 1948; 78 years ago
- Ground: Lindolfinho
- Capacity: 8,000
- League: Campeonato Brasileiro Série D Campeonato Piauiense
- 2025: Piauiense, 1st of 8 (champions)
Home colours	Away colours	Third colours

Piauí Esporte Clube, commonly known as Piauí, are a Brazilian football team from Teresina. They won the Campeonato Piauiense five times and competed in the Série A twice.

== History ==
They were founded on August 15, 1948. The club won the Campeonato Piauiense for the first time in 1966, winning again the competition in the three subsequent years. Piauí competed in the Série A in 1979 and in 1986.

== Stadium ==
They play their home games at the Lindolfinho stadium. The stadium has a maximum capacity of 8,000 people.

== Honours ==
- Campeonato Piauiense
  - Winners (7): 1966, 1967, 1968, 1969, 1985, 2025, 2026
  - Runners-up (9): 1960, 1961, 1970, 1978, 1979, 1981, 1987, 2005, 2014
- Campeonato Piauiense Second Division
  - Winners (2): 1957, 2024
- Torneio Início do Piauí
  - Winners (5): 1966, 1969, 1972, 1980, 1987
