= Piripiri, Piauí =

Coordinates: 4.27333°S 41.7769°W

- Municipality
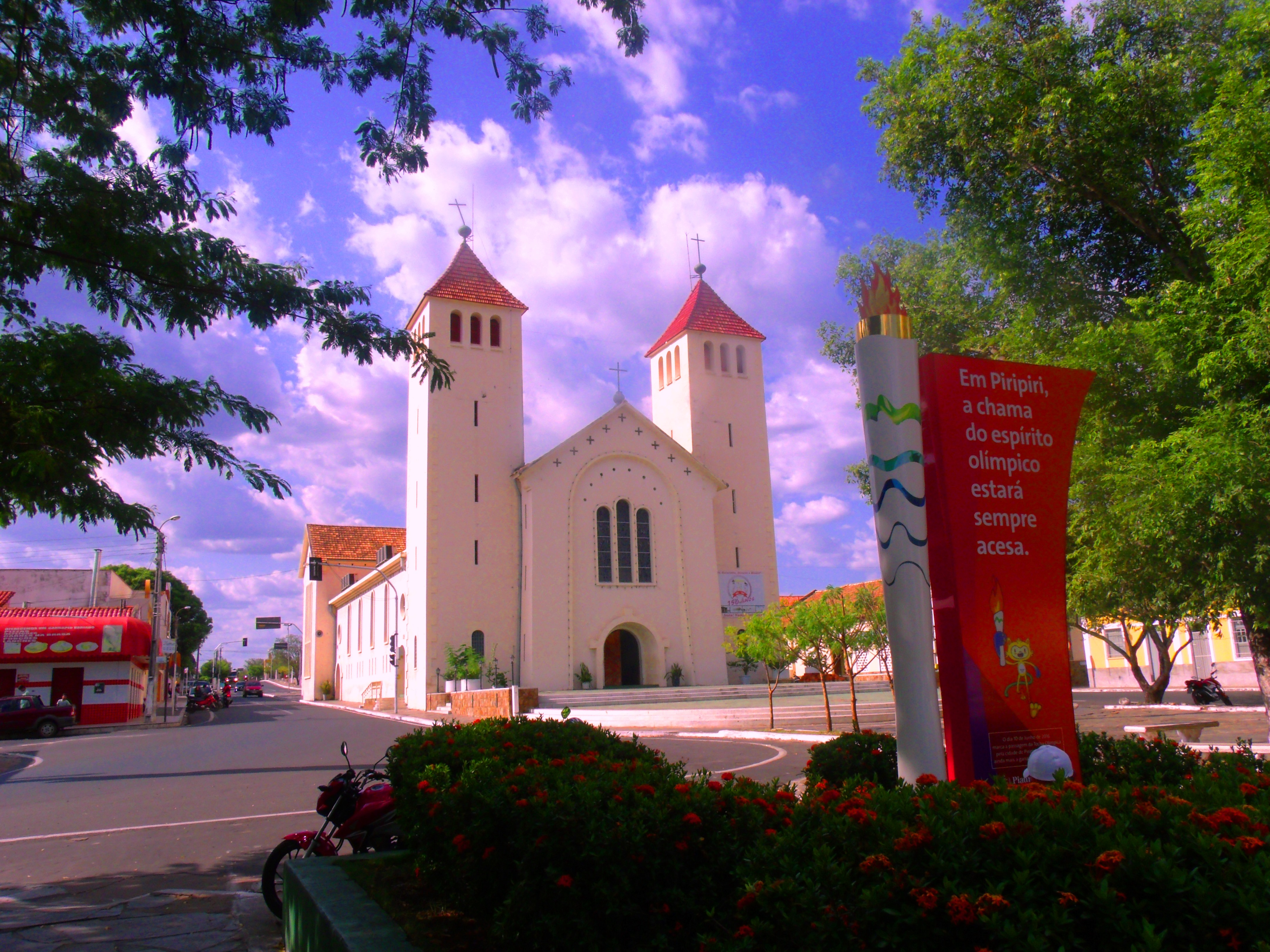

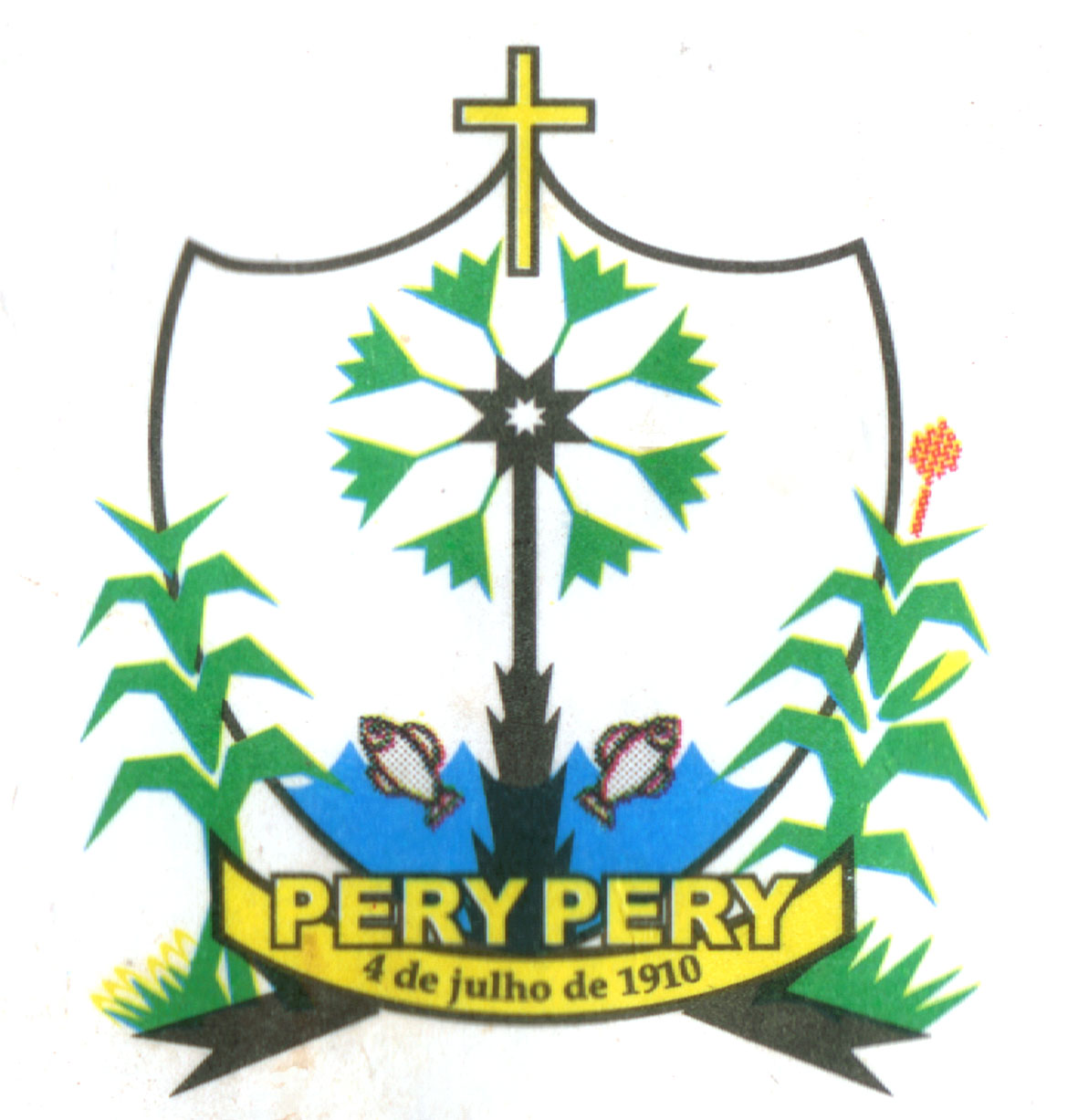
- Flag Coat of arms
- Motto: Piripiri é para o povo (Piripiri is for the people)
- Country: Brazil
- Region: Nordeste
- State: Piauí
- Mesoregion: Norte Piauiense

Government
  - Type: Mayor–council
  - Mayor: Luiz Menezes (PMDB)

Population (2020)
  - Total: 63,787
  - Density: 113.7/sq mi (43.89/km^{2})
- Time zone: UTC−3 (BRT)
- Website: www.piripiri.pi.gov.br

Piripiri, Piauí is a municipality in the state of Piauí in the Northeast region of Brazil. The city's population numbered approximately 63,787 people as of 2020.

The municipality contains part of the 1,592,550 hectares (3,935,300 acres) Serra da Ibiapaba Environmental Protection Area, created in 1996.

== Name ==
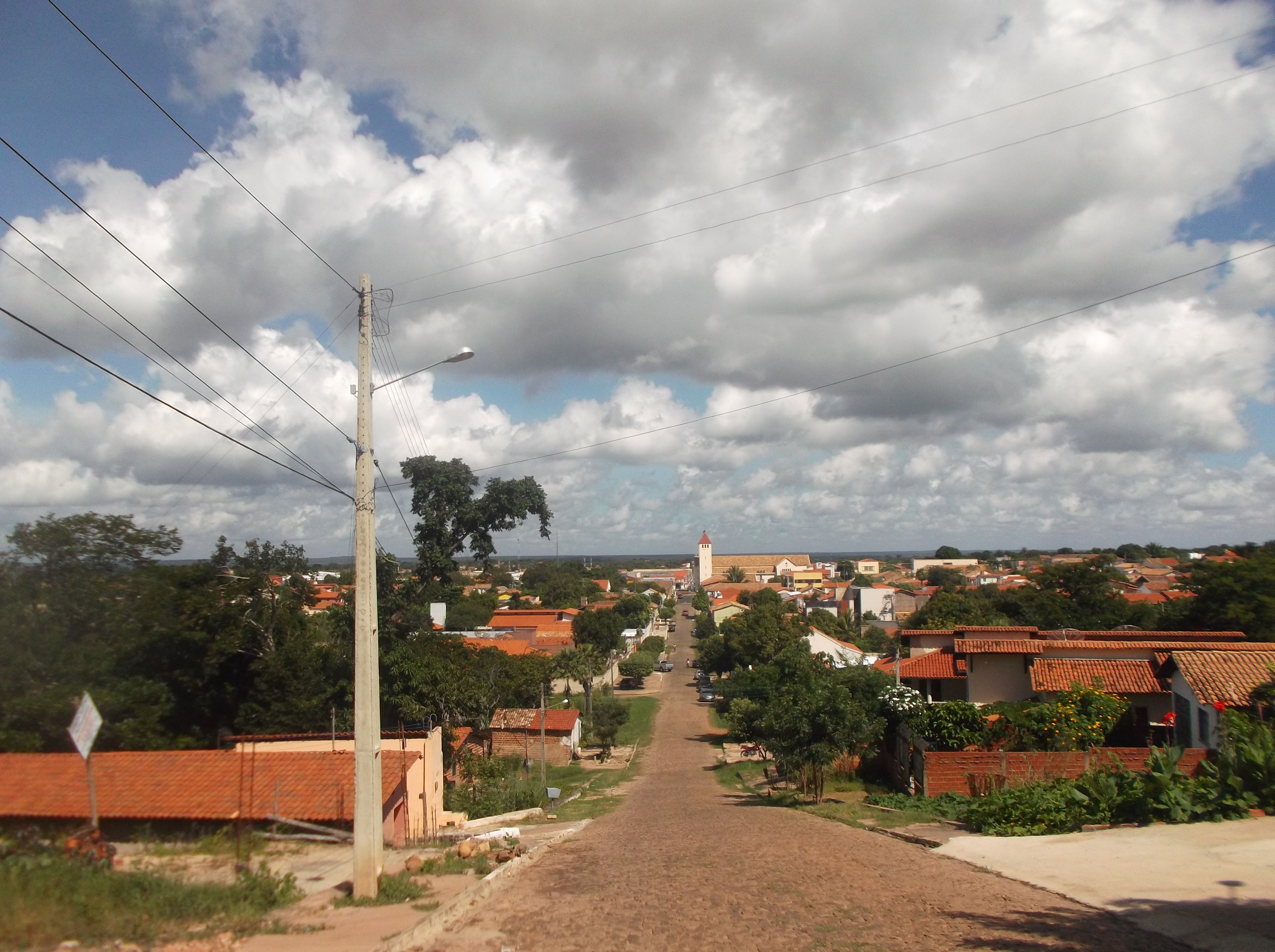
Piripiri Landscape

The name "Piripiri" comes from "Peripery", which means, for some, grass or grasses, and for others, bulrush, bush found near ponds. The city was so named for having much of this grass on founder's farm, Father Domingos de Freitas e Silva.

On November 21, 1944, a IBGE resolution renamed the city Piripiri.

== History ==
The city origin comes from ingrown land in a place called "Botica" issued to Antonio Fernandes Macedo on January 20, 1777. Its foundation goes back to an unknown date of the year 1844, when its owner, Father Domingos de Freitas e Silva, came seeking refuge, after fighting for independence of Piauí, built a house in a place called Anajás, and then, next, a chapel dedicated to Our Lady of Remedies, which is the current patron of the city. Then the priest went to live there with his family from agriculture and livestock.

These two buildings were the only buildings of Piripiri until 1855, when Father Domingos de Freitas e Silva decided to divide the lands of their property in small batches, offering them to those who wanted to live there. Shortly afterwards many families began to arrive in Piripiri. In 1857, Piripiri started to have the appearance of a village, and Father Domingos opened a small school. In this school he gave classes of first letters and Latin for a long time. In 1860, he donated the chapel dedicated to Our Lady of Remedies.

On August 16, 1870, the Piripiri district is elevated to parish with its borders established and attached to the municipality of Piracuruca. On June 16, 1874, Piripiri was elevated to village, still attached to Piracuruca. In 1908, Father Antonio Bezerra de Menezes founded the Instituto Arcoverde (Institute Arcoverde), a primary school that provided important services to the city. In 1910, it was opened the Palacete do Conselho da Vila (Palace of the Village Council), building which was built in 1909. On 4 July 1910, Piripiri village was finally elevated to a city.

== Climate ==
Piripiri has a tropical savanna climate (Köppen: Aw) with consistently hot temperatures. The wet season spans from January to May, while the dry season lasts the rest of the year.

Climate data for Piripiri (1991–2020)
Month	Jan	Feb	Mar	Apr	May	Jun	Jul	Aug	Sep	Oct	Nov	Dec	Year
Mean daily maximum °C (°F)	33.7 (92.7)	32.6 (90.7)	32.0 (89.6)	31.6 (88.9)	32.1 (89.8)	32.7 (90.9)	33.9 (93.0)	35.7 (96.3)	37.1 (98.8)	37.6 (99.7)	37.0 (98.6)	36.0 (96.8)	34.3 (93.7)
Daily mean °C (°F)	27.1 (80.8)	26.4 (79.5)	26.1 (79.0)	26.1 (79.0)	26.5 (79.7)	26.6 (79.9)	27.1 (80.8)	27.9 (82.2)	28.8 (83.8)	29.2 (84.6)	29.2 (84.6)	28.8 (83.8)	27.5 (81.5)
Mean daily minimum °C (°F)	22.8 (73.0)	22.8 (73.0)	22.8 (73.0)	22.9 (73.2)	22.8 (73.0)	21.9 (71.4)	21.5 (70.7)	21.2 (70.2)	21.7 (71.1)	22.5 (72.5)	22.9 (73.2)	23.2 (73.8)	22.4 (72.3)
Average precipitation mm (inches)	196.5 (7.74)	244.5 (9.63)	328.2 (12.92)	311.2 (12.25)	146.9 (5.78)	43.3 (1.70)	15.1 (0.59)	10.8 (0.43)	5.2 (0.20)	21.8 (0.86)	28.5 (1.12)	57.1 (2.25)	1,409.1 (55.48)
Average precipitation days (≥ 1.0 mm 0)	12	15	20	20	12	5	2	2	1	2	3	5	99
Average relative humidity (%)	72.3	78.0	83.4	84.0	79.2	70.1	63.3	55.3	53.0	53.1	56.2	61.0	67.4
Average dew point °C (°F)	22.1 (71.8)	22.8 (73.0)	23.3 (73.9)	23.6 (74.5)	23.2 (73.8)	21.8 (71.2)	20.5 (68.9)	19.4 (66.9)	19.3 (66.7)	19.5 (67.1)	20.1 (68.2)	20.9 (69.6)	21.4 (70.5)
Mean monthly sunshine hours	197.5	182.7	197.4	189.5	232.5	248.2	270.1	296.1	298.8	301.7	273.4	250.0	2,937.9
Source 1: NOAA
Source 2: Instituto Nacional de Meteorologia (precipitation days and humidity 1981–2010)

== Famous residents ==
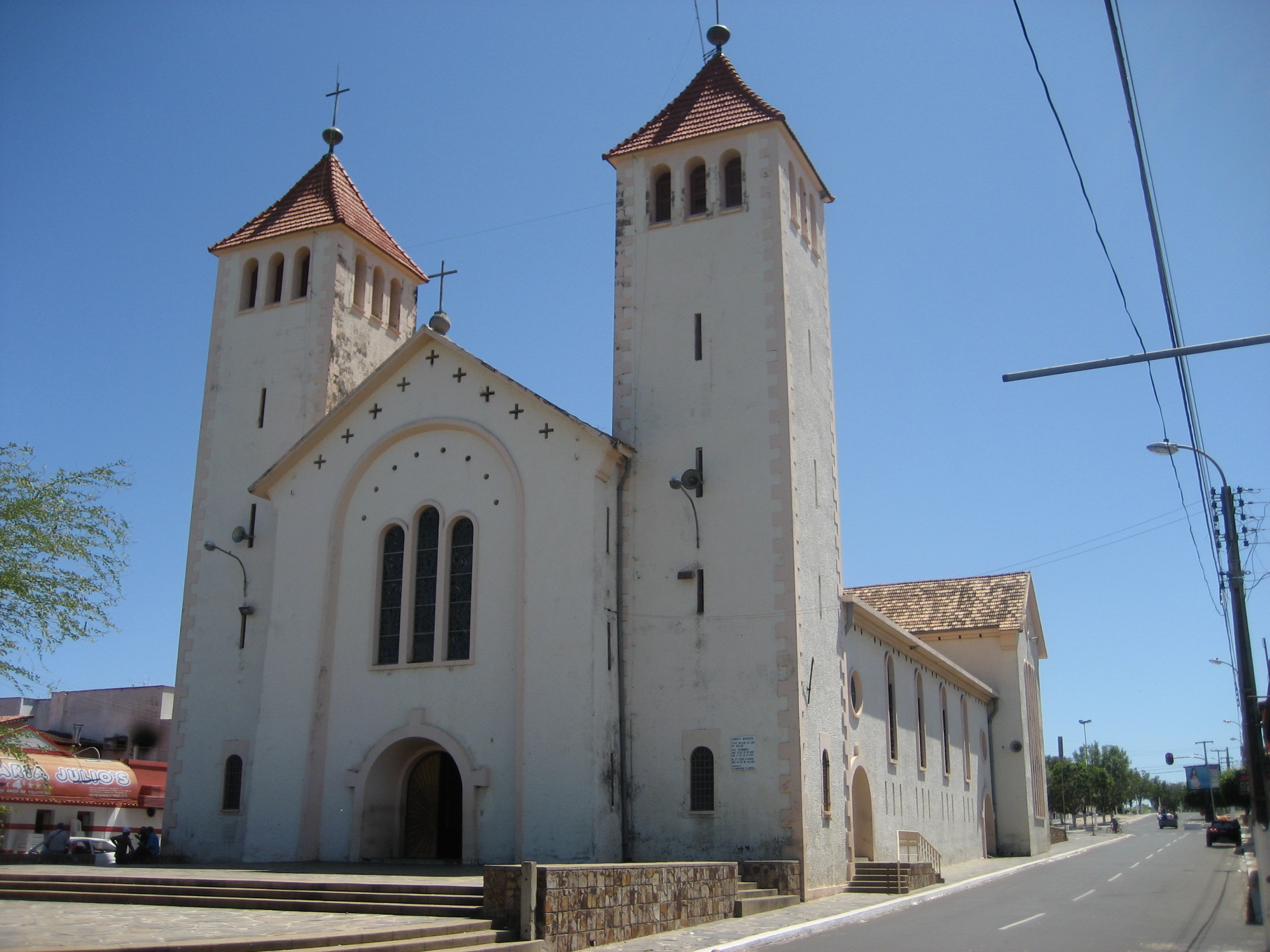
Igreja Matriz Nossa Senhora Dos Remédios

Carlos Emiliano Pereira professional footballer.

== See also ==
- List of municipalities in Piauí
