= Comercial Atlético Clube =

Brazilian football club

Comercial
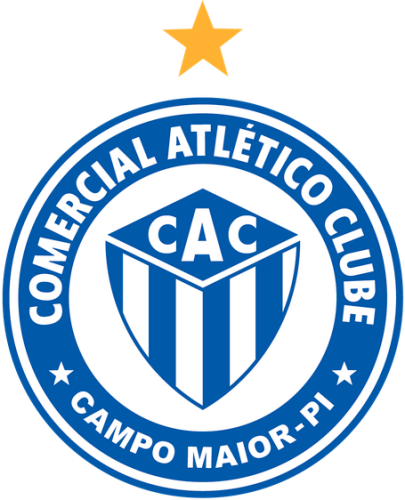
- Full name: Comercial Atlético Clube
- Nickname: O Bode da Terra dos Carnaubais
- Founded: April 21, 1945
- Ground: Estádio Deusdeth de Melo, Campo Maior
- Capacity: 4,000
- President: Luís Carlos
- Head coach: Cícero Monteiro
- League: Campeonato Piauiense Second Level
- 2022: 1st of 5 (champions)
Home colours	Away colours

Comercial Atlético Clube, commonly known as Comercial, is a Brazilian football club based in Campo Maior, Piauí state. They will compete in the 2011 Copa do Brasil.

== History ==
The club was founded on April 21, 1945. Comercial won the Campeonato Piauiense Second Level in 2004 and 2022, the Campeonato Piauiense in 2010, and they competed in the Copa do Brasil in 2011.

== Honours ==
- Campeonato Piauiense
  - Winners (1): 2010
  - Runners-up (2): 1968, 2011
- Campeonato Piauiense Second Division
  - Winners (2): 2004, 2022

== Stadium ==
Comercial Atlético Clube play their home games at Estádio Deusdeth de Melo. The stadium has a maximum capacity of 4,000 people.
