= Sociedade Esportiva Picos =

Picos
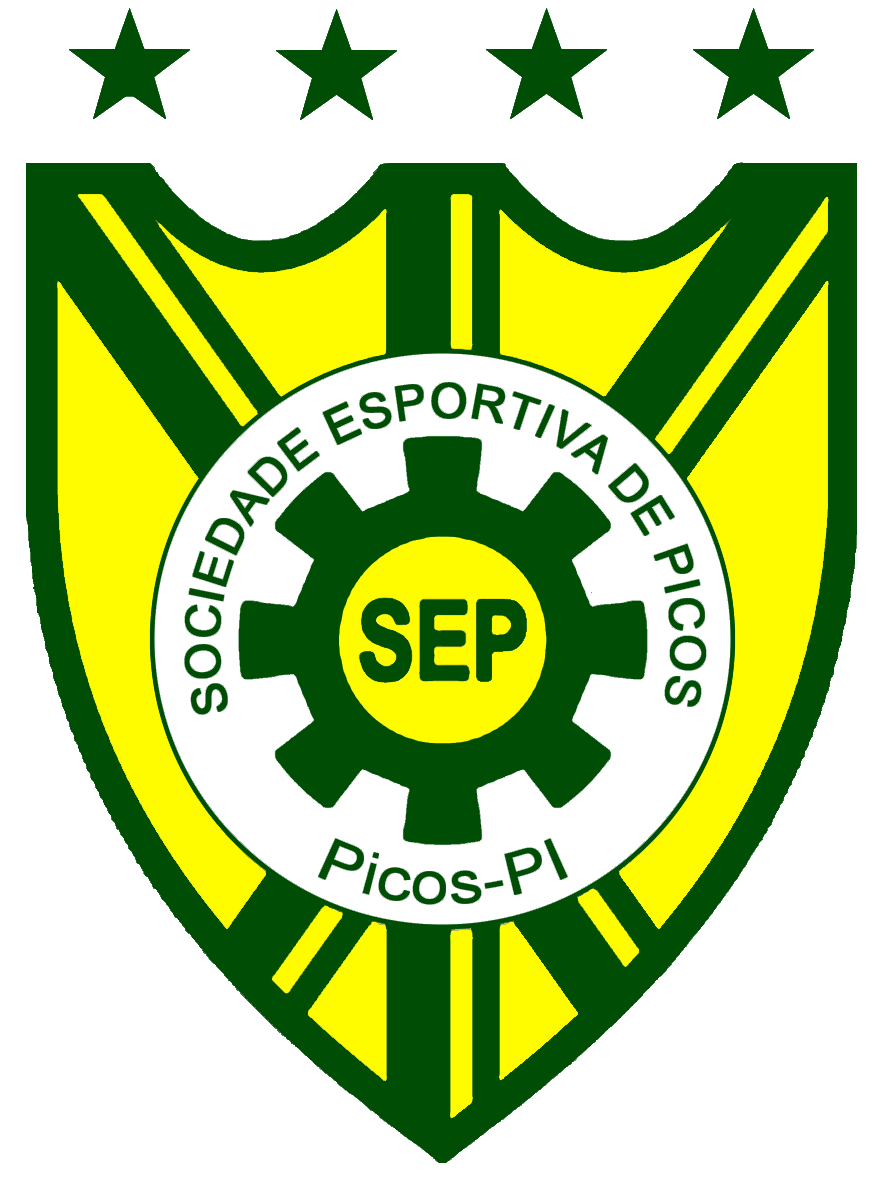
- Full name: Sociedade Esportiva Picos
- Nickname: O Zangão do Piauí (The Drone of Piauí)
- Founded: February 8, 1976; 49 years ago
- Ground: Estádio Helvídio Nunes, Picos, Piauí state, Brazil
- Capacity: 5,400
- President: Antônio Evêncio
- Head Coach: Maurício Simões
- League: Campeonato Piauiense Segunda Divisão
- 2025: Piauiense Segunda Divisão, 5th of 6
Home colours	Away colours

Sociedade Esportiva Picos, commonly known as Picos, is a Brazilian football club based in Picos, Piauí state. They competed in the Série B once, and in the Série C four times.

Picos is currently ranked fourth among Piauí teams in CBF's national club ranking, at 145th place overall.

== History ==
The club was founded on February 8, 1976. Picos won the Campeonato Piauiense in 1991, 1994, 1997, and in 1998. They competed in the Série B in 1992, and competed in the Série C in 1995, when they were eliminated in the Second Stage, in 1997, when they were eliminated in the First Stage, in 1998, when they were eliminated in the Second Stage by Esporte Clube Limoeiro, and in 2008, when they were eliminated in the Second Stage.

== Honours ==
=== State ===
- Campeonato Piauiense
  - Winners (4): 1991, 1994, 1997, 1998
  - Runners-up (2): 2008, 2020
- Campeonato Piauiense Second Division
  - Winners (2): 2007, 2019

=== Women's Football ===
- Campeonato Piauiense de Futebol Feminino
  - Winners (1): 2013

== Stadium ==
Sociedade Esportiva Picos play their home games at Estádio Helvídio Nunes. The stadium has a maximum capacity of 5,400 people.
