= Picos =

- Municipality
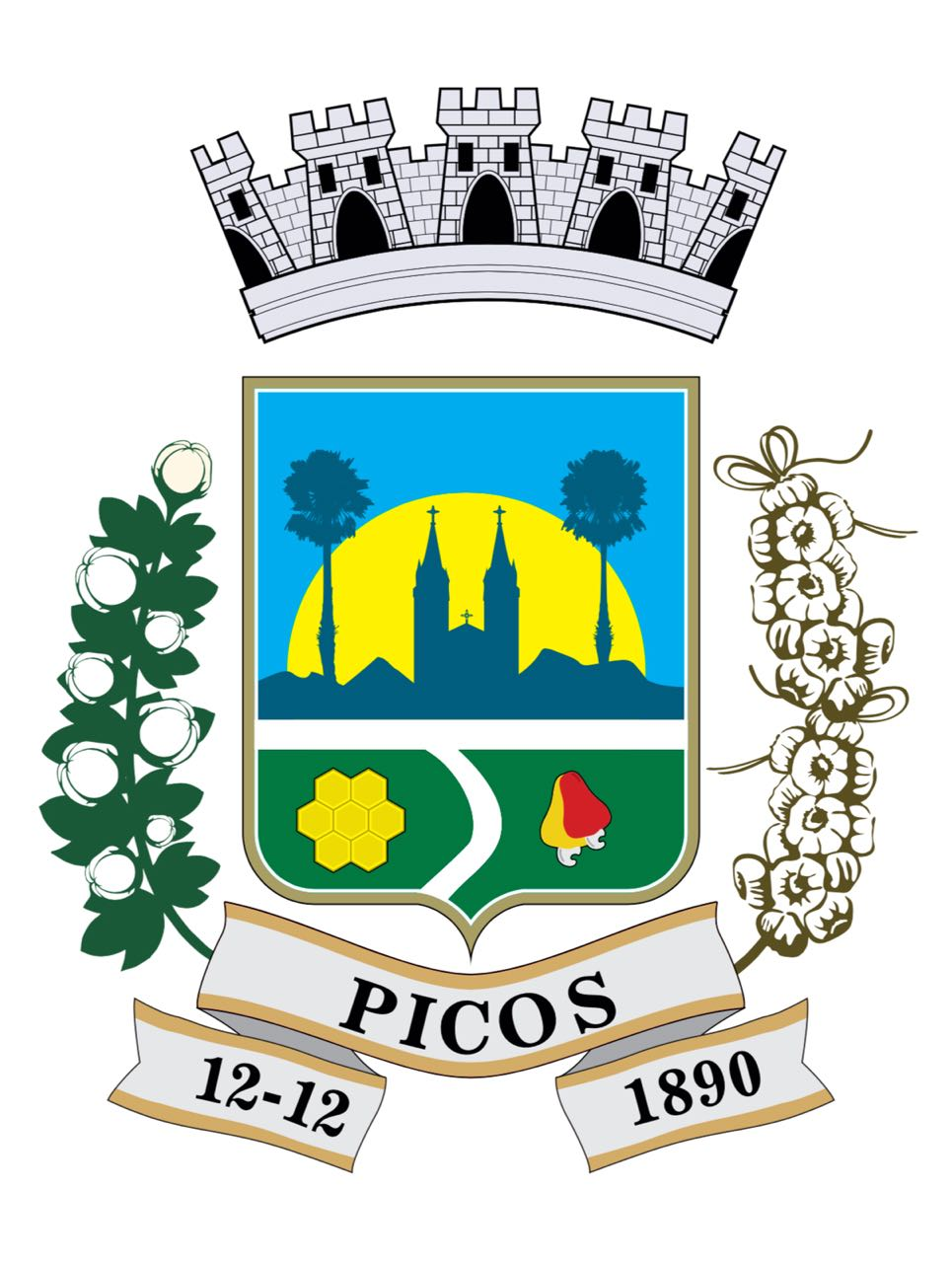
- Flag Coat of arms
- Nicknames: Capital do Mel (Capital of Honey), Capital do Sul Piauiense (Capital of the Piauiense south)
- Motto: "To be from Picos is to be strong!"

- Location in Brazil
- Coordinates: 07°04′37″S 41°28′01″W
- Country: Brazil
- Region: Nordeste
- State: Piauí
- Mesoregion: Sudeste Piauiense
- Founded: December 12, 1890

Government
  - Mayor: Pablo Dantas de Moura Santos (PMDB)

Area
  - Total: 577,304 km^{2} (222,898 sq mi)
- Elevation: 206 m (676 ft)

Population (2020)
  - Total: 78,431
  - Density: 137.3/km^{2} (356/sq mi)
- Time zone: UTC−3 (BRT)
- Demonym: Picosense

Picos is a municipality in the state of Piauí in the Northeast region of Brazil. Picos is the state's third-largest city, located in the south-central region of Piauí and is the most economically developed city in the region. The city's financial prosperity, combined with its geographical location, gives Picos a "commercial hub" status, especially for fuel and honey (Picos is known as the "capital of honey"). As of 2020, the population was approximately 78,431.

== Climate ==
According to data from INMET - National Institute of Meteorology, the city of Picos Piauí has average annual temperature of 29.4 °C (84.9 °F).

Climate data for Picos (1981–2010)
Month	Jan	Feb	Mar	Apr	May	Jun	Jul	Aug	Sep	Oct	Nov	Dec	Year
Mean daily maximum °C (°F)	33.3 (91.9)	32.6 (90.7)	32.2 (90.0)	32.3 (90.1)	33.0 (91.4)	33.4 (92.1)	33.7 (92.7)	35.0 (95.0)	36.6 (97.9)	37.4 (99.3)	36.8 (98.2)	35.3 (95.5)	34.3 (93.7)
Daily mean °C (°F)	27.4 (81.3)	26.7 (80.1)	26.4 (79.5)	26.5 (79.7)	26.7 (80.1)	26.5 (79.7)	26.7 (80.1)	28.0 (82.4)	29.7 (85.5)	30.7 (87.3)	30.4 (86.7)	29.0 (84.2)	27.9 (82.2)
Mean daily minimum °C (°F)	22.9 (73.2)	22.5 (72.5)	22.5 (72.5)	22.2 (72.0)	21.3 (70.3)	20.0 (68.0)	19.6 (67.3)	20.9 (69.6)	22.9 (73.2)	24.6 (76.3)	24.7 (76.5)	23.8 (74.8)	22.3 (72.1)
Average precipitation mm (inches)	146.1 (5.75)	144.3 (5.68)	176.2 (6.94)	137.8 (5.43)	38.1 (1.50)	6.3 (0.25)	2.2 (0.09)	0.2 (0.01)	3.4 (0.13)	19.2 (0.76)	33.8 (1.33)	87.8 (3.46)	795.4 (31.31)
Average precipitation days (≥ 1.0 mm)	11	11	13	10	4	1	1	0	1	2	4	7	65
Average relative humidity (%)	63.6	69.4	73.4	70.4	61.4	52.5	48.8	43.3	38.9	38.0	43.9	52.9	54.7
Mean monthly sunshine hours	200.9	171.4	197.9	212.4	249.4	258.9	284.3	307.7	304.0	293.0	261.2	232.5	2,973.6
Source: Instituto Nacional de Meteorologia

== Demographics ==
The population of the city of Picos is currently 78,431 inhabitants (IBGE 2020), and 58,307 in urban areas and 15,107 in rural areas, thus characterizing the third largest city from Piauí. It has a population density of 137.23 inhabitants / km ².

== Neighborhoods and villages ==
=== Villages ===
Villages include Coroatá, Fátima do Piauí, Gameleira dos Rodrigues, Lagoa Grande, Mirolândia, Morrinhos, Samambaia, Saquinho, Sipaúba, Tapera, Torrões, Val Paraíso and Lagoa Comprida.

=== Neighborhoods ===
Named neighborhoods include Aerolândia, Altamira, Aroeiras do Matadouro, Bairro de Fátima, Belo Sul, Boa Sorte, Boa Vista, Bomba, Canto da Várzea, Catavento, Centro, Condurú, CJ Deputado Sá Urtiga, DNER, Emaús, Ingazeira, Ipueiras, Jardim Natal, Jardim das Oliveiras, Junco, Lousinho Monteiro, Malva, Morada Nova, Morada do Sol, Morro da AABB, Pantanal, Paraibinha, Paroquial (a.k.a. Chão dos Padres), Parque de Exposição, Passagem das Pedras, Pedrinhas, São José, São Sebastião (Malvinas), Trisidela, Umari, Unha de Gato (3º BECnst) e Vila Serrana.

== Transportation ==
The city is served by Sen. Helvídio Nunes Airport.

== Education ==
=== Schools ===
Public schools include E. Téc. Est. Petrônio Portela (PREMEM), Esc. Normal Official De Picos, U.E. Antonio Marques, U.E. Araújo Luz, U.E. Cel, Fco. Santos, U.E. Coelho Rodrigues, U.E. Dirceu Mendes Arcoverde, U.E. Jorge Leopoldo, U.E. José De Deus Barros, U.E. Julieta Neiva Nunes, U.E. Landri Sales, E. Pol. Marcos Parente, U.E. Mario Martins, U.E Miguel Lidiano, U.E. Ozildo Albano, U.E. Petrônio Portela, U.E. Poliv. Des. José Vidal Freitas, U.E. Teresinha Nunes, U.E. Urbano Eulálio Filho and Ceja José De Sousa Bispo.

Private schools include former Colégio São Lucas, Colégio Decisão, Colégio Machado de Assis, former Colégio Antares, now Colégio São Judas tadeu, Instituto Monsenhor Hipólito (Colégio das Irmãs), Colégio Santa Rita, and Instituto Nivardo Moura.

=== Colleges and Universities ===
- UESPI - State University of Piauí
- UFPI - Federal University of Piauí
- IESRSA - Institute of Higher Education R. Sá
- IFPI - Federal Institute for Education, Science and Technology
- ISEAF - Institute of Education Antonino Freire
- UNOPAR - Universidade Norte do Paraná

=== Federal Institutes of Education and Learning ===
- SENAI/FIEP (National Service of Industrial Learning)
- Senac (National Service of Commercial Learning)
- SESI (Industrial Social Service)
- SEST/Senate (Social Service Transportation / National Service Learning Transportation)

== See also ==
- List of municipalities in Piauí
