= Estádio Lindolfo Monteiro =

Stadium in Teresina, Brazil

Coordinates: 5°05′05″S 43°49′16″W

- Lindolfinho
- Interactive map of Estádio Lindolfo Monteiro
- Full name: Estádio Lindolfo Monteiro
- Location: Teresina, Piauí, Brazil
- Capacity: 12,760
- Surface: Grass

Construction
- Opened: 1944

Tenant
- Ríver Atlético Clube

Estádio Lindolfo Monteiro is a stadium in Teresina, Brazil. It has a capacity of 15,269 spectators.
