= Campo Maior, Piauí =

Coordinates: 4°50′00″S 42°10′25″W

Campo Maior
- Municipality
- Municipality of Campo Maior
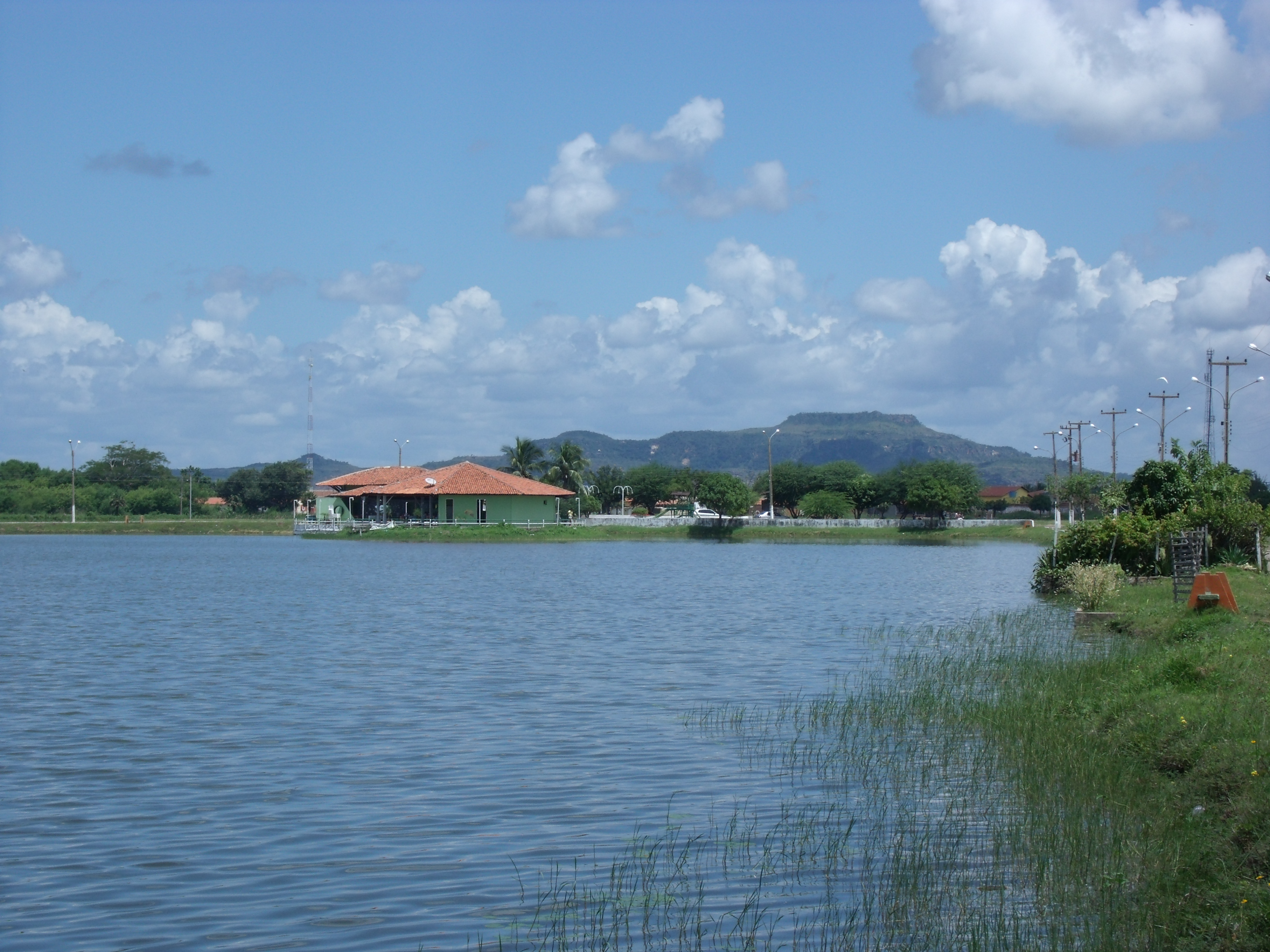

- Flag Coat of arms

- Country: Brazil
- Region: Northeast
- State: Piauí
- Mesoregion: Centro-Norte Piauiense

Population (2020)
  - Total: 46,893
- Time zone: UTC−3 (BRT)

Campo Maior, Piauí is a municipality in the state of Piauí in the Northeast region of Brazil.

Its Catedral Santo Antônio, dedicated to Saint Anthony, is the cathedral episcopal see of the Roman Catholic Diocese of Campo Maior.

== See also ==
- List of municipalities in Piauí
