= River Atlético Clube =

Brazilian association football club based in Teresina, Piauí, Brazil

River
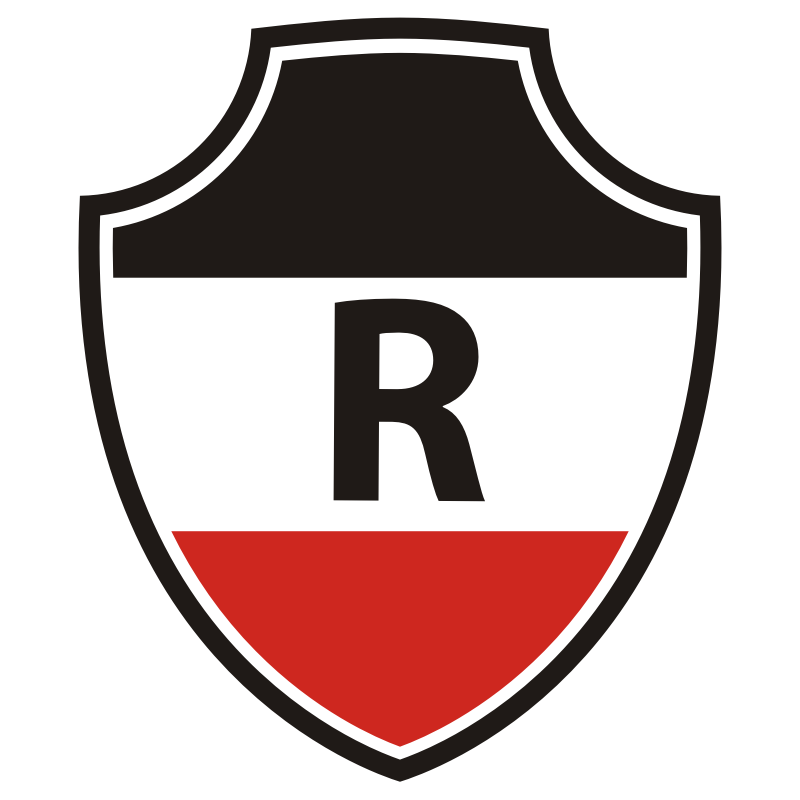
- Full name: River Atlético Clube
- Nicknames: River; O Eterno Campeão (The Eternal Champion); O Maior do Piauí (The Biggest of Piauí); Tricolor Mafrense (Mafrense's Tricolour); Tricolaço (Steel Tricolour); Galo Carijó (Carijó's Rooster); Galo Maluco (Crazy Rooster); Galo de Aço (Steel Rooster)
- Founded: 1 March 1946; 80 years ago
- Ground: Albertão
- Capacity: 52,216
- President: Ítalo Rodrigues
- Head coach: Gerson Gusmão
- League: Campeonato Piauiense Segunda Divisão
- 2025: Piauiense, 8th of 8 (relegated)
- Website: http://www.riveratleticoclube.com.br/
Home colors	Away colors

River Atlético Clube, commonly referred to as River, is a Brazilian professional club based in Teresina, Piauí founded on 1 March 1946. It competes in the Campeonato Piauiense Segunda Divisāo, the second tier of the Piauí state football league.

River is currently ranked third among Piauí teams in CBF's national club ranking, at 107th place overall. River is the best club in Piauí, in terms of titles won.

== History ==
On March 1, 1946, A group of students from "Ginásio Leão XIII", at the time directed by professor Antilhon Ribeiro Soares, met to discuss the founding of a sports club that would take the name of River Atlético Clube.

The club's first game was played on February 15, 1948, a match against Amarantino. River's first goal was scored by Antônio Freire (Freirinho). The game was held in the city of Amarante, and River won 4-3. Almost a month later, on March 12, 1948, there was the so-called 'reorganization' of the club, led by Afrânio Messias Alves Nunes (River's most successful president - 11 titles). In 1948, River disputed the state championship and won it for their first major title. From 1950 to 1963, River won thirteen state titles, with the exception of the 1957 state championship.

In 1977, the club competed in the Brazilian Championship for the first time, finishing in the 41st place. The club competed in the championship again in 1978, finishing in the 69th place, in 1979, finishing in the 83rd place, in 1981, finishing in the 39th place, and in 1982, finishing in the 44th place.

In 2000, River competed in the Copa João Havelange, which was the competition that replaced the Brazilian Championship in that year. The club was in the yellow module (which was that season's equivalent to the second level), and was eliminated in the first stage.

In 2015, the club made the finals of Serie D, played against Botafogo-SP. River lost the first leg 3-2. In the second leg, 40,000 fans were in attendance, which was by far the largest attended match in the league, as both teams played to a 0-0 draw which gave Botafogo the title. Despite losing the finals, River earned a spot in the 2016 Série C.

In the 2016 Serie C, River had a poor campaign, finishing last with only 2/18 wins and being immediately relegated to Serie D.

== Stadium ==
The club's home matches are usually played at Governador Alberto Tavares Silva stadium, nicknamed Albertão, which has a maximum capacity of 60,000 people.

River also plays at Estádio Lindolfo Monteiro, nicknamed Lindolfinho, which has a maximum capacity of 8,000 people.

== Rivalries ==
The club has a rivalry with Esporte Clube Flamengo, and matches between the two clubs are known as Rivengo, a truncation of the clubs' names, River and Flamengo.

== Club colors and mascot ==
River's official colors are red, black and white.

The club's mascot is a rooster.

== Honours ==
=== Official tournaments ===
State
Competitions	Titles	Seasons
Campeonato Piauiense	32	1948, 1950, 1951, 1952, 1953, 1954, 1955, 1956, 1958, 1959, 1960, 1961, 1962, 1963, 1973, 1975, 1977, 1978, 1980, 1981, 1989, 1996, 1999, 2000, 2001, 2002, 2007, 2014, 2015, 2016, 2019, 2023
Copa Piauí	1	2006
Campeonato Piauiense Second Division	1	2026

- record

=== Others tournaments ===
==== Inter-state ====
- Torneio Maranhão-Piauí (1): 1980

==== State ====
- Torneio Início do Piauí (10): 1949, 1950, 1951, 1953, 1955, 1959, 1962, 1964, 1971 1978

=== Runners-up ===
- Campeonato Brasileiro Série D (1): 2015
- Campeonato Piauiense (15): 1949, 1957, 1964, 1965, 1967, 1968, 1969, 1971, 1974, 1982, 1986, 1991, 2004, 2013, 2018
- Copa Piauí (2): 2012, 2017
