= 1989 São Paulo FC season =

São Paulo
1989 season
- Chairman: Juvenal Juvêncio
- Manager: Cilinho (until March 26); Pupo Gimenez (caretaker, until April 9); Carlos Alberto Silva
- Série A: Runners-up
- Campeonato Paulista: Champions (16th title)
- Top goalscorer: Mário Tilico (6)

The 1989 season was São Paulo's 60th season since club's existence.

== Statistics ==
=== Scorers ===
| Position | Nation | Playing position | Name | Campeonato Paulista | Campeonato Brasileiro | Others | Total |
|---|---|---|---|---|---|---|---|
| 1 | (Brazil) | FW | Mário Tilico | 4 | 6 | 2 | 12 |
| 2 | (Brazil) | MF | Bobô | 4 | 3 | 1 | 8 |
| 3 | (Brazil) | FW | Edivaldo | 2 | 4 | 0 | 6 |
| = | (Brazil) | FW | Ney Bala | 3 | 3 | 0 | 6 |
| = | (Brazil) | MF | Paulo César | 4 | 2 | 0 | 6 |
| = | (Brazil) | MF | Raí | 3 | 3 | 0 | 6 |
| 4 | (Brazil) | MF | Renatinho | 4 | 0 | 0 | 4 |
| 5 | (Brazil) | MF | Flávio | 2 | 1 | 0 | 3 |
| = | (Brazil) | FW | Marcelo | 3 | 0 | 0 | 3 |
| 6 | (Brazil) | MF | Benê | 1 | 1 | 0 | 2 |
| = | (Brazil) | MF | Bernardo | 2 | 0 | 0 | 2 |
| = | (Brazil) | FW | Mazinho Loiola | 2 | 0 | 0 | 2 |
| 7 | (Brazil) | DF | Adílson | 1 | 0 | 0 | 1 |
| = | (Brazil) | MF | Betinho | 0 | 0 | 1 | 1 |
| = | (Brazil) | FW | Edmílson | 0 | 1 | 0 | 1 |
| = | (Brazil) | DF | Nelsinho | 0 | 0 | 1 | 1 |
| = | (Brazil) | MF | Vizolli | 1 | 0 | 0 | 1 |
| = | (Brazil) | DF | Zé Teodoro | 0 | 1 | 0 | 1 |
| | | | Own goals | 1 | 0 | 0 | 1 |
| | | | Total | 37 | 25 | 5 | 67 |

=== Managers performance ===
| Name | Nationality | From | To | P | W | D | L | GF | GA | % |
|---|---|---|---|---|---|---|---|---|---|---|
| Cilinho | Brazil | 19 February | 26 March | 7 | 4 | 2 | 1 | 13 | 4 | 71% |
| Pupo Gimenez (caretaker) | Brazil | 29 March | 9 April | 4 | 1 | 3 | 0 | 2 | 1 | 62% |
| Carlos Alberto Silva | Brazil | 15 April | 16 December | 41 | 18 | 17 | 6 | 52 | 29 | 65% |

=== Overall ===
| Games played | 52 (29 Campeonato Paulista, 19 Campeonato Brasileiro, 4 Friendly match) |
| Games won | 23 (14 Campeonato Paulista, 7 Campeonato Brasileiro, 2 Friendly match) |
| Games drawn | 22 (11 Campeonato Paulista, 9 Campeonato Brasileiro, 2 Friendly match) |
| Games lost | 7 (4 Campeonato Paulista, 3 Campeonato Brasileiro, 0 Friendly match) |
| Goals scored | 67 |
| Goals conceded | 34 |
| Goal difference | +33 |
| Best result | 4–0 (A) v Juventus - Campeonato Paulista - 1989.04.19 |
| Worst result | 1–4 (A) v Atlético Mineiro - Campeonato Brasileiro - 1989.09.20 |
| Top scorer | Mário Tilico (12) |

Source: São Paulo FC

== Friendlies ==
Matches played with the B team

| January 8 International | India | 0–4 | (Brazil) São Paulo | New Delhi |
| | | | Anílton; Renatinho; Benê; Flávio |

| January 11 International | India | 2–2 | (Brazil) São Paulo | Bangalore |
| | Kuljit Singh; Kuljit Singh | | Mazinho; Flávio |

| September 24 KKT Gahara Cup | Yokohama Flügels (Japan) | 2–3 | (Brazil) São Paulo | Kumamoto |
| | Goal | | Goal |

=== Torneo Hexagonal de Guadalajara ===
| August 18 International | Guadalajara (Mexico) | 1–3 | (Brazil) São Paulo | Guadalajara |
| | Diego Sílva 89' | Report | Bobô 20'; Mário Tilico 34'; Nelsinho 52' | Stadium: Estadio Jalisco |

| August 22 International | Atlas (Mexico) | 0–1 | (Brazil) São Paulo | Guadalajara |
| | | Report | Mário Tilico 66' | Stadium: Estadio Jalisco |

| August 25 International | Leones Negros UdeG (Mexico) | 1–1 | (Brazil) São Paulo | Guadalajara |
| | Octavio Mora 48' | Report | Betinho 61' | Stadium: Estadio Jalisco |

| August 27 International | Leones Negros UdeG (Mexico) | 0–0 (4–5 p) | (Brazil) São Paulo | Guadalajara |
| | | Report | | Stadium: Estadio Jalisco |

== Official competitions ==
=== Campeonato Paulista ===
| Pos | Team | Pld | W | PW | D | PL | L | GF | GA | GD | Pts | Qualification or relegation |
|---|---|---|---|---|---|---|---|---|---|---|---|---|
| 3 | Guarani | 21 | 9 | 1 | 5 | 3 | 3 | 34 | 15 | +19 | 29 | Qualified |
| 4 | Portuguesa | 21 | 9 | 0 | 7 | 2 | 3 | 32 | 15 | +17 | 29 | Qualified |
| 5 | São Paulo | 21 | 9 | 2 | 3 | 3 | 4 | 27 | 12 | +15 | 29 | Qualified |
| 6 | Corinthians | 21 | 10 | 2 | 3 | 0 | 6 | 27 | 17 | +10 | 28 | Qualified |
| 7 | Bragantino | 21 | 10 | 1 | 4 | 0 | 6 | 18 | 15 | +3 | 25 | Qualified |

Updated to match(es) played on May 28, 1989. Source: RSSSF.com
Rules for classification: 1) points; 2) head-to-head points; 3) wins; 4) goal difference; 5) number of goals scored.

==== Matches ====
| February 19 1 | São Paulo | 3–1 | XV de Jaú | São Paulo |
| | Marcelo 37', 88'; Edivaldo 55' | | Edvaldo 4' | Stadium: Pacaembu; Attendance: 2,965; Referee: Paulo Eduardo Pereira Barjas |

| February 23 2 | XV de Piracicaba | 1–0 | São Paulo | Piracicaba |
| | Carlinhos 7' | | | Stadium: Barão da Serra Negra; Attendance: 6,259; Referee: Ilton José da Costa |

| March 1 3 | São Paulo | 3–0 | Mogi Mirim | São Paulo |
| | Bernardo 35'; Marcelo 51'; Raí 61' | | | Stadium: Morumbi; Attendance: 2,517; Referee: José de Assis Aragão |

| March 4 4 | Noroeste | 1–3 | São Paulo | Bauru |
| | Tuzinho 10' | | Bernardo 24'; Renatinho 85', 87' | Stadium: Alfredo de Castilho; Attendance: 7,062; Referee: Dulcídio Wanderley Boschillia |

| March 12 5 | São Paulo | 4–1 | América | São Paulo |
| | Flávio 14'; Renatinho 22'; Mário Tilico 39'; Mazinho Loiola 54' | | Gil Catanoce 41' | Stadium: Morumbi; Attendance: 8,447; Referee: Almir Ricci Peixoto Laguna |

| March 22 6 | União São João | 0–0 | São Paulo | Araras |
| | | | | Stadium: Hermínio Ometto; Attendance: 7,115; Referee: José Roberto Ramiz Wright |

| March 26 7 | São Paulo | 0–0 | Catanduvense | São Paulo |
| | | | | Stadium: Morumbi; Attendance: 5,841; Referee: Edmundo Lima Filho |

| March 29 8 | Novorizontino | 0–0 | São Paulo | Novo Horizonte |
| | | | | Stadium: Jorge Ismael de Biasi; Attendance: 5,511; Referee: Dulcídio Wanderley Boschillia |

| April 2 9 | Internacional | 0–0 | São Paulo | Limeira |
| | | | | Stadium: Estádio José Levy Sobrinho; Attendance: 6,949; Referee: Arnaldo David Cezar Coelho |

| April 5 10 | Botafogo | 0–1 | São Paulo | Ribeirão Preto |
| | | | Mário Tilico 41' | Stadium: Santa Cruz; Attendance: 8,518; Referee: Oswaldo dos Santos Ramos |

| April 9 11 | São Paulo | 1–1 | Ferroviária | São Paulo |
| | Paulo César 89' | | Volnei 78' | Stadium: Morumbi; Attendance: 25,448; Referee: Modesto Salviato Filho |

| April 15 12 | São José | 0–0 | São Paulo | São José dos Campos |
| | | | | Stadium: Martins Pereira; Attendance: 15,388; Referee: Oswaldo dos Santos Ramos |

| April 19 13 | Juventus | 0–4 | São Paulo | São Paulo |
| | | | Edivaldo 14'; Ney Bala 38'; Flávio 61'; Paulo César 71' | Stadium: Pacaembu; Attendance: 1,939; Referee: Dulcídio Wanderley Boschillia |

| April 23 14 | Portuguesa | 1–1 | São Paulo | São Paulo |
| | Toninho 25' | | Paulo César 65' | Stadium: Morumbi; Attendance: 22,606; Referee: Arnaldo David Cezar Coelho |

| April 30 15 | São Paulo | 1–1 | Palmeiras | São Paulo |
| | Bobô 76' | | Edu Manga 24' | Stadium: Morumbi; Attendance: 71,872; Referee: Dulcídio Wanderley Boschillia |

| May 4 16 | Bragantino | 1–0 | São Paulo | Bragança Paulista |
| | Zé Rubens 45' | | | Stadium: Marcelo Stéfani; Attendance: 11,145; Referee: José Roberto Ramiz Wright |

| May 7 17 | São Paulo | 0–2 | Corinthians | São Paulo |
| | | | Ronaldão 9' (o.g.); Marcos Roberto 54' | Stadium: Morumbi; Attendance: 49,690; Referee: José de Assis Aragão |

| May 14 18 | São Paulo | 1–0 | Guarani | São Paulo |
| | Benê 10' | | | Stadium: Morumbi; Attendance: 12,197; Referee: Válter Francisco dos Santos |

| May 18 19 | Santos | 2–1 | São Paulo | São Paulo |
| | Junior 25'; Sócrates 54' | | Paulo César 63' | Stadium: Pacaembu; Attendance: 9,278; Referee: Dagoberto Teixeira |

| May 21 20 | São Paulo | 3–0 | São Bento | São Paulo |
| | Renatinho 73'; Mazinho Loiola 75'; Bobô 86' | | | Stadium: Morumbi; Attendance: 7,044; Referee: João Paulo Araújo |

| May 27 21 | São Paulo | 1–0 | Santo André | São Paulo |
| | Bobô 55' | | | Stadium: Morumbi; Attendance: 4,895; Referee: João Massoneto |

==== Second stage ====
| Pos | Team | Pld | W | D | L | GF | GA | GD | Pts | Qualification or relegation |
|---|---|---|---|---|---|---|---|---|---|---|
| 1 | São Paulo | 4 | 2 | 2 | 0 | 6 | 4 | +2 | 6 | Qualified |
| 2 | Guarani | 4 | 1 | 1 | 2 | 6 | 6 | 0 | 3 | |
| 3 | Inter de Limeira | 4 | 1 | 1 | 2 | 3 | 5 | −2 | 3 | |

Updated to match(es) played on June 18, 1989. Source: RSSSF.com
Rules for classification: 1) points; 2) wins; 3) goal difference; 4) Best season record

| June 3 1 | São Paulo | 1–1 | Guarani | São Paulo |
| | Adílson 6' | | Vagner Paulista 57' | Stadium: Morumbi; Attendance: 18,507; Referee: Luís Carlos Antunes |

| June 8 2 | Internacional | 1–1 | São Paulo | Limeira |
| | Machado 26' | | Vizolli 21' | Stadium: José Levy Sobrinho; Attendance: 8,566; Referee: Dulcídio Wanderley Boschillia |

| June 14 3 | São Paulo | 1–0 | Internacional | São Paulo |
| | Bobô 43' | | | Stadium: Morumbi; Attendance: 9,141; Referee: Almir Ricci Peixoto Laguna |

| June 17 4 | Guarani | 2–3 | São Paulo | Campinas |
| | Tosin 18'; Cassus 54' | | Ney Bala 34'; Raí 63'; Mário Tilico 84' | Stadium: Brinco de Ouro; Attendance: 17,633; Referee: Dulcídio Wanderley Boschillia |

==== Semifinals ====
| June 21 Semi-final | Bragantino | 0–2 | São Paulo | Bragança Paulista |
| | | | Mário Tilico 40'; Raí 76' | Stadium: Marcelo Stéfani; Attendance: 13,878; Referee: Wilson Carlos dos Santos |

| June 24 Semi-final | São Paulo | 1–0 | Bragantino | São Paulo |
| | Ney Bala 31' | | | Stadium: Morumbi; Attendance: 47,431; Referee: Arnaldo César Coelho |

==== Finals ====
| June 28 Final | São Paulo | 1–0 | São José | São Paulo |
| | André Luís 86' (o.g.) | | | Stadium: Morumbi; Attendance: 50,633; Referee: Dulcídio Wanderley Boschilia |

| July 2 Final | São José | 0–0 | São Paulo | São Paulo |
| | | | | Stadium: Morumbi; Attendance: 97,965; Referee: José de Assis Aragão |

==== Record ====
| Final Position | Points | Matches | Wins | Draws | Losses | Goals For | Goals Away | Win% |
|---|---|---|---|---|---|---|---|---|
| 1st | 42 | 29 | 14 | 11 | 4 | 37 | 16 | 72% |

=== Campeonato Brasileiro ===
==== First stage ====
Group A
| Pos | Team | Pld | W | D | L | GF | GA | GD | Pts | Qualification |
|---|---|---|---|---|---|---|---|---|---|---|
| 5 | Internacional-SP | 10 | 3 | 4 | 3 | 8 | 8 | 0 | 10 | Second Stage |
| 6 | Flamengo | 10 | 3 | 4 | 3 | 6 | 7 | −1 | 10 | Second Stage |
| 7 | São Paulo | 10 | 2 | 6 | 2 | 11 | 11 | 0 | 10 | Second Stage |
| 8 | Internacional-RS | 10 | 3 | 3 | 4 | 6 | 6 | 0 | 9 | Second Stage |
| 9 | Guarani | 10 | 3 | 3 | 4 | 7 | 8 | −1 | 9 | Relegation Tournament |

===== Matches =====
| September 7 1 | Atlético Paranaense | 0–0 | São Paulo | Curitiba |
| | | | | Stadium: Pinheirão; Attendance: 5,211; Referee: Carlos Sergio Rosa Martins |

| September 10 2 | São Paulo | 0–0 | Vitória | São Paulo |
| | | | | Stadium: Morumbi; Attendance: 4,064; Referee: Edson Rezende de Oliveira |

| September 16 3 | Náutico | 3–3 | São Paulo | Recife |
| | Bizu 45', 79'; Levi 54' | | Edivaldo 44'; Bobô 68'; Paulo César 75' | Stadium: Aflitos; Attendance: 7,305; Referee: Alvimar Gaspar dos Reis |

| September 20 4 | Atlético Mineiro | 4–1 | São Paulo | Belo Horizonte |
| | Gérson 6'; Carlão 21'; Robertinho 25', 31' | | Benê 15' | Stadium: Mineirão; Attendance: 11,532; Referee: Pedro Carlos Bregalda |

| September 24 5 | Corinthians | 2–1 | São Paulo | São Paulo |
| | João Paulo 44'; Neto 56' | | Bobô 45' | Stadium: Morumbi; Attendance: 16,044; Referee: Oswaldo dos Santos Ramos |

| September 30 6 | São Paulo | 2–1 | Internacional-RS | São Paulo |
| | Edmílson 38'; Mário Tilico 44' | | Nelson 75' | Stadium: Morumbi; Attendance: 4,015; Referee: Dalmo Bozzano |

| October 7 7 | São Paulo | 1–1 | Botafogo | São Paulo |
| | Bobô 69' | | Paulinho Criciúma 6' | Stadium: Morumbi; Attendance: 8,095; Referee: Márcio Rezende de Freitas |

| October 15 8 | Internacional-SP | 0–0 | São Paulo | Limeira |
| | | | | Stadium: José Levy Sobrinho; Attendance: 10,695; Referee: José de Assis Aragão |

| October 18 9 | São Paulo | 3–0 | Flamengo | São Paulo |
| | Paulo César 44'; Mário Tilico 60'; Zé Teodoro 75' | | | Stadium: Morumbi; Attendance: 11,424; Referee: Carlos Sergio Rosa Martins |

| October 21 10 | São Paulo | 0–0 | Guarani | São Paulo |
| | | | | Stadium: Morumbi; Attendance: 9,528; Referee: Wilson Carlos dos Santos |

==== Second stage ====
Group A
| Pos | Team | Pld | W | D | L | GF | GA | GD | Pts | Qualification |
|---|---|---|---|---|---|---|---|---|---|---|
| 1 | São Paulo | 18 | 7 | 9 | 2 | 25 | 15 | +10 | 23 | Qualified to the final |
| 2 | Botafogo | 18 | 9 | 4 | 5 | 20 | 16 | +4 | 22 | |
| 3 | Corinthians | 18 | 8 | 5 | 5 | 15 | 13 | +2 | 21 | |
| 4 | Atlético Mineiro | 18 | 6 | 7 | 5 | 21 | 13 | +8 | 19 | |
| 5 | Flamengo | 18 | 6 | 7 | 5 | 16 | 13 | +3 | 19 | |

===== Matches =====
| October 29 1 | Vasco da Gama | 0–0 | São Paulo | Rio de Janeiro |
| | | | | Stadium: Maracanã; Attendance: 34,592; Referee: Arnaldo David Cezar Coelho |

| November 5 2 | São Paulo | 2–2 | Palmeiras | São Paulo |
| | Mário Tilico 11', 23' | | Dida 40'; Paulinho Carioca 66' | Stadium: Morumbi; Attendance: 29,701; Referee: José de Assis Aragão |

| November 11 3 | São Paulo | 3–0 | Santos | São Paulo |
| | Ney Bala 5'; Edivaldo 25'; Flavio 87' | | | Stadium: Morumbi; Attendance: 13,180; Referee: Edmundo Lima Filho |

| November 19 4 | São Paulo | 2–0 | Cruzeiro | São Paulo |
| | Ney Bala 30'; Raí 62' | | | Stadium: Morumbi; Attendance: 9,781; Referee: Wilson Carlos dos Santos |

| November 23 5 | São Paulo | 3–1 | Fluminense | São Paulo |
| | Raí 50'; Mário Tilico 59'; Ney Bala 62' | | Sílvio 57' | Stadium: Morumbi; Attendance: 10,769; Referee: Renato Marsiglia |

| November 26 6 | Goiás | 0–0 | São Paulo | Goiânia |
| | | | | Stadium: Estádio Serra Dourada; Attendance: 10,106; Referee: José Araújo Oliveira |

| December 3 7 | Grêmio | 1–3 | São Paulo | Porto Alegre |
| | Kita 40' | | Edivaldo 10'; Mário Tilico 33'; Raí 69' | Stadium: Olímpico; Attendance: 4,109; Referee: José Roberto Wright |

| December 10 8 | Portuguesa | 0–1 | São Paulo | São Paulo |
| | | | Edivaldo 79' | Stadium: Canindé; Attendance: 19,360; Referee: José Roberto Wright |

==== Final ====
| 16 December 1989 Final | São Paulo | 0–1 | Vasco da Gama | São Paulo |
| | | | Sorato 50' | Stadium: Morumbi; Attendance: 71,552; Referee: Wilson Carlos dos Santos |

==== Record ====
| Final Position | Points | Matches | Wins | Draws | Losses | Goals For | Goals Away | Win% |
|---|---|---|---|---|---|---|---|---|
| 2nd | 23 | 19 | 7 | 9 | 3 | 25 | 16 | 60% |
