= 1988 São Paulo FC season =

São Paulo
1988 season
- Chairman: Carlos Miguel Aidar; Juvenal Juvêncio
- Manager: Cilinho; Pupo Gimenez (caretaker)
- Série A: First stage
- Campeonato Paulista: Semi finals
- Top goalscorer: League: Edivaldo (7); All: Müller (17)

The 1988 season was São Paulo's 59th season since club's existence.

== Statistics ==
=== Scorers ===
Position	Nation	Playing position	Name	Campeonato Paulista	Campeonato Brasileiro	Others	Total
1	(Brazil)	FW	Müller	17	0	0	17
2	(Brazil)	FW	Edivaldo	5	7	2	14
3	(Brazil)	MF	Raí	5	4	3	12
4	(Brazil)	FW	Lê	6	1	1	8
5	(Brazil)	MF	Bernardo	2	0	1	3
=	(Brazil)	FW	Mazinho Loiola	0	3	0	3
=	(Brazil)	MF	Renatinho	0	3	0	3
6	(Brazil)	MF	Pita	2	0	0	2
=	(Brazil)	FW	Marcelo	2	0	0	2
=	(Brazil)	FW	Mário Tilico	0	2	0	2
=	(Brazil)	FW	Sídney	2	0	0	2
=	(Brazil)	MF	Silas	1	0	1	2
7	(Brazil)	DF	Adílson	1	0	0	1
=	(Brazil)	MF	Paulo César	0	1	0	1
			Total	43	21	8	72

=== Managers performance ===
Name	Nationality	From	To	P	W	D	L	GF	GA	%
Cilinho	Brazil	10 February	18 December	50	24	14	12	70	44	62%
Pupo Gimenez (caretaker)	Brazil	19 June	19 June	1	0	1	0	2	2	50%

=== Overall ===
Games played	51 (25 Campeonato Paulista, 23 Campeonato Brasileiro, 3 Friendly match)
Games won	24 (13 Campeonato Paulista, 9 Campeonato Brasileiro, 2 Friendly match)
Games drawn	15 (6 Campeonato Paulista, 8 Campeonato Brasileiro, 1 Friendly match)
Games lost	12 (6 Campeonato Paulista, 6 Campeonato Brasileiro, 0 Friendly match)
Goals scored	72
Goals conceded	46
Goal difference	+26
Best result	5–0 (H) v América - Campeonato Paulista - 1988.03.09
Worst result	0–3 (H) v Guarani - Campeonato Paulista - 1988.03.23; 0–3 (H) v Santos - Campeonato Paulista - 1988.05.22; 0–3 (A) v Grêmio - Campeonato Brasileiro - 1988.09.07
Top scorer	Müller (17)

Source: São Paulo FC

== Friendlies ==
10 February Troféu Miguel Assad Filho	Jabaquara	0–2	São Paulo	Santos
			Silas 26'; Bernardo 40'	Stadium: Ulrico Mursa; Referee: Romualdo Arppi Filho

21 February National	Ituano	0–4	São Paulo	Itu
			Raí 13', 26', 33'; Edivaldo 59'	Stadium: Novelli Júnior; Attendance: 4,194; Referee: Ilton da Costa

19 June Stora 100yrs Trophy	IK Brage (Sweden)	2–2	(Brazil) São Paulo	Borlänge
	Hysen 40'; Gren 51'		Lê 21'; Edivaldo 54'	Stadium: Domnarvsvallen

== Official competitions ==
=== Campeonato Paulista ===
February 28 First stage 1	São Paulo	1–2	Corinthians	São Paulo
	Edivaldo 39'		Wilson Mano 37'; Edmar 56'	Stadium: Morumbi; Attendance: 27,788; Referee: Arnaldo David Cezar Coelho

March 5 First stage 2	XV de Piracicaba	1–0	São Paulo	Piracicaba
	Douglas 43'			Stadium: Barão da Serra Negra; Attendance: 5,041; Referee: Ilton José da Costa

March 9 First stage 3	São Paulo	5–0	América	São Paulo
	Müller 9', 21', 45'; Raí 35'; Sidney 49'			Stadium: Morumbi; Attendance: 3,776; Referee: Ulisses Tavares da Silva Filho

March 13 First stage 4	Portuguesa	1–4	São Paulo	São Paulo
	Jorginho 86'		Müller 25', 37', 70'; Silas 84'	Stadium: Estádio do Canindé; Attendance: 21,989; Referee: Dulcídio Wanderley Boschillia

March 19 First stage 5	Ferroviária	1–2	São Paulo	Araraquara
	Silvano 67'		Müller 44'; Raí 56'	Stadium: Fonte Luminosa; Attendance: 5,101; Referee: José de Assis Aragão

March 23 First stage 6	São Paulo	0–3	Guarani	São Paulo
			Evair 39', 41', 89'	Stadium: Morumbi; Attendance: 14,461; Referee: Dulcídio Wanderley Boschillia

March 26 First stage 7	São Bento	0–1	São Paulo	Sorocaba
			Sidney 19'	Stadium: Estádio Wálter Ribeiro; Attendance: 4,907; Referee: Renato Marsiglia

March 30 First stage 8	São Paulo	1–1	São José	São Paulo
	Edivaldo 71'		Marcus Vinícius 50'	Stadium: Morumbi; Attendance: 6,511; Referee: João Leopoldo Ayeta

April 6 First stage 9	São Paulo	2–0	Santo André	São Paulo
	Lê 48'; Pita 78'			Stadium: Morumbi; Attendance: 4,338; Referee: Ulisses Tavares da Silva Filho

April 10 First stage 10	Palmeiras	1–3	São Paulo	São Paulo
	Raí 2' (o.g.)		Adilson 18'; Müller 30'; Pita 58'	Stadium: Pacaembu; Attendance: 43,868; Referee: José de Assis Aragão

April 30 First stage 11	Internacional	0–0	São Paulo	Limeira
				Stadium: Estádio José Levy Sobrinho; Attendance: 7,606; Referee: Dulcídio Wanderley Boschillia

May 4 First stage 12	São Paulo	0–2	Juventus	São Paulo
			Betinho 24'; Aluísio 59'	Stadium: Morumbi; Attendance: 2,432; Referee: Flávio de Carvalho

May 8 First stage 13	União São João	1–2	São Paulo	Araras
	Celso Luís 8'		Lê 28', 59'	Stadium: Estádio Hermínio Ometto; Attendance: 8,184; Referee: José de Assis Aragão

May 11 First stage 14	São Paulo	2–0	Noroeste	São Paulo
	Müller 27', 82'			Stadium: Morumbi; Attendance: 2,621; Referee: Joaquim Carlos Caetano

May 15 First stage 15	Novorizontino	3–4	São Paulo	Novo Horizonte
	Serginho 24'; Marquinhos 26', 70'		Bernardo 49'; Müller 52', 89'; Lê 85'	Stadium: Estádio Jorge Ismael de Biasi; Attendance: 5,416; Referee: Dalmo Bozzano

May 22 First stage 16	São Paulo	0–3	Santos	São Paulo
			Serginho Chulapa 33'; Mendonça 37'; César Sampaio 88'	Stadium: Morumbi; Attendance: 26,548; Referee: Renato Marsiglia

May 25 First stage 17	São Paulo	3–0	XV de Jaú	São Paulo
	Müller 28', 59'; Bernardo 39'			Stadium: Morumbi; Attendance: 1,714; Referee: Ulisses Tavares da Silva Filho

May 28 First stage 18	Botafogo	1–1	São Paulo	Ribeirão Preto
	Rogerinho 11'		Müller 67'	Stadium: Estádio Santa Cruz; Attendance: 7,271; Referee: Almir Ricci Peixoto Laguna

June 4 First stage 19	Mogi Mirim	0–4	São Paulo	Mogi Mirim
			Müller 18'; Lê 54'; Edivaldo 66'; Raí 73'	Stadium: Estádio Vail Chaves; Attendance: 1,579; Referee: José de Assis Aragão

June 26 Second stage 1	Corinthians	2–2	São Paulo	São Paulo
	Everton 80', 90'		Müller 19'; Raí 35'	Stadium: Pacaembu; Attendance: 47,707; Referee: Dulcídio Wanderley Boschillia

June 29 Second stage 2	São Paulo	2–0	Santos	São Paulo
	Raí 16'; Lê 81'			Stadium: Morumbi; Attendance: 19,076; Referee: Ulisses Tavares da Silva Filho

July 3 Second stage 3	Palmeiras	1–2	São Paulo	São Paulo
	Lino 50'		Edivaldo 16'; Marcelo 83'	Stadium: Pacaembu; Attendance: 48,086; Referee: Ilton José da Costa

July 10 Second stage 4	São Paulo	1–1	Corinthians	São Paulo
	Edivaldo 31'		Biro-Biro 73'	Stadium: Morumbi; Attendance: 79,821; Referee: Renato Marsiglia

July 13 Second stage 5	Santos	1–1	São Paulo	São Paulo
	Mendonça 26'		Marcelo 62'	Stadium: Pacaembu; Attendance: 18,753; Referee: Dulcídio Wanderley Boschillia

July 17 Second stage 6	São Paulo	0–1	Palmeiras	São Paulo
			Gérson Caçapa 89'	Stadium: Morumbi; Attendance: 33,274; Referee: Dulcídio Wanderley Boschillia

==== Record ====
Final Position	Points	Matches	Wins	Draws	Losses	Goals For	Goals Away	Win%
3rd	32	25	13	6	6	43	26	64%

=== Campeonato Brasileiro ===
September 4 Round 1	Corinthians	0–1	São Paulo	São Paulo
		Report (pt)	Renatinho 89'	Stadium: Estádio Cícero Pompeu de Toledo (Morumbi); Attendance: 14,281; Referee: Luís Carlos Félix

September 7 Round 2	Grêmio	3–0	São Paulo	Porto Alegre
	Marcos Vinicius 8'; Jorge Veras 29'; Cristóvão 65'	Report (pt)		Stadium: Estádio Olímpico Monumental; Attendance: 13,328; Referee: Wilson Carlos dos Santos

September 11 Round 3	São Paulo	1–0	Botafogo	São Paulo
	Renatinho 79'	Report (pt)		Stadium: Estádio Cícero Pompeu de Toledo (Morumbi); Attendance: 6,244; Referee: Gílson Ramos Cordeiro

September 18 Round 4	São Paulo	0–0 (4–5 p)	Coritiba	São Paulo
		Report (pt)		Stadium: Estádio Cícero Pompeu de Toledo (Morumbi); Attendance: 5,283; Referee: Gílson Ramos Cordeiro
	Penalties
	Edivaldo (penalty scored); Raí (penalty scored); Flávio (penalty scored); Renatinho (penalty scored)		(penalty scored) Marquinho Carioca; (penalty scored) Chicão; (penalty scored) Tostão; (penalty scored) Marquinho; (penalty scored) Ditinho

September 24 Round 5	São Paulo	1–0	América-RJ	São Paulo
	Raí 43'	Report (pt)		Stadium: Estádio Cícero Pompeu de Toledo (Morumbi); Attendance: 2,579; Referee: Alvimar Gaspar dos Reis

October 2 Round 6	São Paulo	1–0	Santos	São Paulo
	Edivaldo 2'	Report (pt)		Stadium: Estádio Cícero Pompeu de Toledo (Morumbi); Attendance: 5,853; Referee: Luís Carlos Félix

October 9 Round 7	Santa Cruz	1–0	São Paulo	Recife
	Cosmo 8'	Report (pt)		Stadium: Estádio José do Rego Maciel(Arruda); Attendance: 9,740; Referee: Manoel Serapião Filho

October 15 Round 8	Guarani	1–0	São Paulo	Campinas
	Cilinho 67'	Report (pt)		Stadium: Estádio Brinco de Ouro da Princesa; Attendance: 5,016; Referee: Pedro Carlos Bregalda

October 22 Round 9	São Paulo	0–2	Bahia	São Paulo
		Report (pt)	Bobô 11'; Zé Carlos 45'	Stadium: Estádio Cícero Pompeu de Toledo (Morumbi); Attendance: 5,926; Referee: Arnaldo David Cezar Coelho

October 30 Round 10	Vasco da Gama	1–1 (4–3 p)	São Paulo	Rio de Janeiro
	Bismarck 69'	Report (pt)	Paulo César 85'	Stadium: Estádio Vasco da Gama (São Januário); Attendance: 13,155; Referee: Carlos Sergio Rosa Martins
	Penalties
	Mazinho (penalty scored); Bismarck (penalty scored); Geovani (penalty scored); Célio Silva (penalty scored)		(penalty scored) Edivaldo; (penalty scored) Raí; (penalty scored) Flávio

November 6 Round 11	São Paulo	1–0	Criciúma	São Paulo
	Mário Tilico 66'	Report (pt)		Stadium: Estádio Cícero Pompeu de Toledo (Morumbi); Attendance: 2,699; Referee: Paulo Roberto Chaves Duarte

November 9 Round 12	Cruzeiro	0–1	São Paulo	São Paulo
		Report (pt)	Edivaldo 50'	Stadium: Estádio Governador Magalhães Pinto (Mineirão); Attendance: 6,800; Referee: José Araújo de Oliveira

November 13 Round 13	Palmeiras	1–1 (5–6 p)	São Paulo	São Paulo
	Zanata 61'	Report (pt)	Lê 58'	Stadium: Estádio Palestra Itália (Parque Antárctica); Attendance: 15,933; Referee: Ilton José da Costa
	Penalties
	Zanata (penalty scored); Bandeira (penalty scored); Amauri (penalty scored); Silvio (penalty scored); Gaúcho (penalty scored)		(penalty scored) Edivaldo; (penalty scored) Raí; (penalty scored) Flávio; (penalty scored) Paulo César; (penalty scored) Zé Teodoro; (penalty scored) Ivan

November 17 Round 14	São Paulo	2–0	Internacional	São Paulo
	Mário Tilico 36'; Edivaldo 45'	Report (pt)		Stadium: Estádio Cícero Pompeu de Toledo (Morumbi); Attendance: 4,563; Referee: Arnaldo David Cezar Coelho

November 20 Round 15	Vitória	2–2 (1–2 p)	São Paulo	Salvador
	Benjy 31'; Odair 54'	Report (pt)	Mazinho Loyola 22'; Raí 52'	Stadium: Estádio Octávio Mangabeira (Fonte Nova); Attendance: 5,429; Referee: Manoel Amaro de Lima
	Penalties
	Maurício (penalty scored)		(penalty scored) Flávio; (penalty scored) Zé Teodoro

November 24 Round 16	São Paulo	2–1	Flamengo	São Paulo
	Raí 45'; Edivaldo 70'	Report (pt)	Alcindo 9'	Stadium: Estádio Cícero Pompeu de Toledo (Morumbi); Attendance: 26,499; Referee: Carlos Sergio Rosa Martins

November 27 Round 17	São Paulo	3–0	Sport	São Paulo
	Edivaldo 55', 61'; Renatinho 82'	Report (pt)		Stadium: Estádio Cícero Pompeu de Toledo (Morumbi); Attendance: 12,140; Referee: Arnaldo David Cezar Coelho

December 1 Round 18	Bangu	0–0 (3–4 p)	São Paulo	Rio de Janeiro
		Report (pt)		Stadium: Estádio Proletário Guilherme da Silveira Filho (Moça Bonita); Attendance: 2,641; Referee: Renato Marsiglia
	Penalties
	Israel (penalty scored); Robson (penalty scored); Léo (penalty scored)		(penalty scored) Edivaldo; (penalty scored) Raí; (penalty scored) Flávio; (penalty scored) Ivan

December 4 Round 19	São Paulo	0–1	Portuguesa	São Paulo
		Report (pt)	Bentinho 50'	Stadium: Estádio Cícero Pompeu de Toledo (Morumbi); Attendance: 18,120; Referee: José de Assis Aragão

December 8 Round 20	Atlético Paranaense	1–1 (4–5 p)	São Paulo	Curitiba
	Agnaldo 69'	Report (pt)	Mazinho Loyola 71'	Stadium: Complexo Poliesportivo Pinheirão; Attendance: 7,846; Referee: Carlos Sergio Rosa Martins
	Penalties
	Juninho (penalty scored); Roberto Cavalo (penalty scored); Vilson (penalty scored); Carlinhos (penalty scored)		(penalty scored) Edivaldo; (penalty scored) Raí; (penalty scored) Ivan; (penalty scored) Netinho; (penalty scored) Adílson

December 11 Round 21	São Paulo	2–2 (2–4 p)	Atlético Mineiro	São Paulo
	Mazinho Loyola 28'; Edivaldo 72'	Report (pt)	Renato 44'; Carlão 67'	Stadium: Estádio Cícero Pompeu de Toledo (Morumbi); Attendance: 18,602; Referee: Nei Andrade Nunesmaia
	Penalties
	Flávio (penalty scored); Ivan (penalty scored)		(penalty scored) Luizinho; (penalty scored) Moacir; (penalty scored) Marquinhos; (penalty scored) Gérson

December 15 Round 22	Fluminense	1–0	São Paulo	Rio de Janeiro
	Cacau 69'	Report (pt)		Stadium: Estádio Jornalista Mário Filho (Maracanã); Attendance: 2,506; Referee: Carlos Sergio Rosa Martins

December 18 Round 23	São Paulo	1–1 (3–4 p)	Goiás	São Paulo
	Raí 55'	Report (pt)	Jorge Batata 69'	Stadium: Estádio Cícero Pompeu de Toledo (Morumbi); Attendance: 19,107; Referee: Tito Rodrigues
	Penalties
	Edivaldo (penalty scored); Raí (penalty scored); Ivan (penalty scored)		(penalty scored) Fagundes; (penalty scored) Josué; (penalty scored) Uidemar; (penalty scored) Ronaldo Castro

==== Record ====
Final Position	Points	Matches	Wins	P.k. Wins	Draws	Losses	P.k. Losses	Goals For	Goals Away	Win%
11th	39	23	9	4	8	6	4	21	18	56%
