= 1990 São Paulo FC season =

São Paulo
1990 season
- Chairman: Juvenal Juvêncio; José Eduardo Mesquita Pimenta
- Manager: Carlos Alberto Silva (until 8 April); Pupo Gimenez (caretaker, until 24 May); Pablo Forlan (until 10 October); Telê Santana
- Campeonato Brasileiro: Runners-up
- Copa do Brasil: Round of 16
- Campeonato Paulista: Repechage stage (in Yellow Group)
- Top goalscorer: League: Eliel and Raí (5); All: Diego Aguirre (8)

The 1990 season was São Paulo's 61st season since club's existence.

== Statistics ==
=== Scorers ===
Position	Nation	Playing position	Name	Campeonato Paulista	Copa do Brasil	Campeonato Brasileiro	Others	Total
1	(Uruguay)	FW	Diego Aguirre	0	2	3	3	8
2	(Brazil)	FW	Mário Tilico	4	0	3	0	7
=	(Brazil)	MF	Raí	2	0	5	0	7
3	(Brazil)	FW	Ney Bala	6	0	0	0	6
=	(Brazil)	MF	Renatinho	6	0	0	0	6
4	(Brazil)	DF	Cafu	2	0	1	2	5
=	(Brazil)	FW	Eliel	0	0	5	0	5
5	(Brazil)	MF	Bernardo	2	0	1	0	3
=	(Brazil)	MF	Bobô	3	0	0	0	3
=	(Brazil)	MF	Flávio	3	0	0	0	3
=	(Brazil)	DF	Ronaldão	1	1	1	0	3
6	(Brazil)	FW	Anílton	2	0	0	0	2
=	(Brazil)	MF	Betinho	2	0	0	0	2
=	(Brazil)	FW	Edmílson	2	0	0	0	2
=	(Uruguay)	MF	Juan Ramón Carrasco	0	2	0	0	2
=	(Brazil)	FW	Marcinho	2	0	0	0	2
=	(Brazil)	DF	Nelsinho	2	0	0	0	2
7	(Brazil)	FW	Alcindo	0	0	1	0	1
=	(Brazil)	DF	Antônio Carlos	0	0	1	0	1
=	(Brazil)	DF	César	0	0	0	1	1
=	(Brazil)	MF	Elivélton	0	0	1	0	1
=	(Brazil)	MF	Gilmar Popoca	0	0	1	0	1
=	(Brazil)	DF	Ivan	0	0	1	0	1
=	(Brazil)	MF	Paulo César	1	0	0	0	1
=	(Brazil)	MF	Vizolli	1	0	0	0	1
			Total	41	5	24	6	76

=== Managers performance ===
Name	Nationality	From	To	P	W	D	L	GF	GA	%
Carlos Alberto Silva	Brazil	28 January	8 April	15	5	4	6	11	12	46%
Pupo Gimenez (caretaker)	Brazil	15 April	27 May	11	5	3	3	15	8	59%
Pablo Forlan	Uruguay	30 May	10 October	29	12	11	6	36	22	60%
Telê Santana	Brazil	14 October	16 December	14	6	4	4	14	8	57%

=== Overall ===
Games played	69 (33 Campeonato Paulista, 6 Copa do Brasil, 25 Campeonato Brasileiro, 5 Friendly match)
Games won	28 (13 Campeonato Paulista, 3 Copa do Brasil, 10 Campeonato Brasileiro, 2 Friendly match)
Games drawn	22 (10 Campeonato Paulista, 2 Copa do Brasil, 7 Campeonato Brasileiro, 3 Friendly match)
Games lost	19 (10 Campeonato Paulista, 1 Copa do Brasil, 8 Campeonato Brasileiro, 0 Friendly match)
Goals scored	76
Goals conceded	50
Goal difference	+26
Best result	6–1 (H) v Noroeste - Campeonato Paulista - 1990.06.19
Worst result	0–2 (H) v Palmeiras - Campeonato Paulista - 1990.04.15; 0–2 (A) v Criciúma - Copa do Brasil - 1990.08.02
Top scorer	Diego Aguirre (8)

Source: São Paulo FC

== Friendlies ==
15 July National	Pouso Alegre	0–1	São Paulo	Cambuí
			Cafu 25'	Stadium: Monte Castelo; Referee: Gilberto Santos

=== Copa Amistad ===
19 July International	Colo-Colo (Chile)	0–0	(Brazil) São Paulo	Santiago
				Stadium: Nacional; Referee: Carlos Manuel Robles Mella

21 July International	Universidad Católica (Chile)	0–2	(Brazil) São Paulo	Santiago
			Aguirre 14'; Cafu 78'	Stadium: Nacional; Referee: Salvador Imperatore Marcone

=== Copa Solidariedad de León ===
11 August International	León (Mexico)	2–2 (3–4 p)	(Brazil) São Paulo	León, Guanajuato
	Goal		Aguirre,	Stadium: Nou Camp

14 August International	Guadalajara (Mexico)	1–1 (3–4 p)	(Brazil) São Paulo	León, Guanajuato
	Zetti (o.g.)		César	Stadium: Nou Camp

== Official competitions ==
=== Campeonato Paulista ===
==== League table ====
Pos	Team	Pld	W	D	L	GF	GA	GD	Pts	Qualification or relegation
6	Mogi Mirim	23	6	13	4	23	20	+3	25	Qualified
7	Portuguesa	23	5	15	3	24	20	+4	25	Qualified
8	São Paulo	23	8	7	8	22	17	+5	23	Second phase
9	União São João	23	7	9	7	22	17	+5	23	Second phase
10	Guarani	23	6	11	6	18	15	+3	23	Second phase

Updated to match(es) played on May 12, 1990. Source: RSSSF.com
Rules for classification: 1) points; 2) wins; 3) goal difference; 4) number of goals scored.

===== Matches =====
28 January First stage 1	Ponte Preta	0–0	São Paulo	Campinas
				Stadium: Moisés Lucarelli; Attendance: 6,986; Referee: Oscar Roberto de Godói

4 February First stage 2	São Paulo	2–1	Juventus	São Paulo
	Mário Tilico 16'; Renatinho 70'		Élcio 30'	Stadium: Canindé; Attendance: 6,416; Referee: Ilton José da Costa

8 February First stage 3	América	1–0	São Paulo	São José do Rio Preto
	Márcio Florêncio 69'			Stadium: Mário Alves de Mendonça; Attendance: 7,995; Referee: Dulcídio Wanderley Boschillia

11 February First stage 4	São Paulo	1–0	Ituano	São Paulo
	Mário Tilico 15'			Stadium: Morumbi; Attendance: 2,528; Referee: José Roberto Ramiz Wright

18 February First stage 5	Catanduvense	0–1	São Paulo	Catanduva
			Raí 16'	Stadium: Estádio Silvio Salles; Attendance: 3,931; Referee: Antônio de Pádua Sales

21 February First stage 6	São Paulo	0–0	Noroeste	São Paulo
				Stadium: Morumbi; Attendance: 1,343; Referee: Renato Marsiglia

3 March First stage 7	Ferroviária	3–2	São Paulo	Araraquara
	Donato 25'; Paulinho Taiúva 58'; Vanderlei 76'		Paulo César 42'; Mário Tilico 64'	Stadium: Estádio Fonte Luminosa; Attendance: 5,631; Referee: Nilton Carlos Busnello

7 March First stage 8	São Paulo	1–1	Botafogo	São Paulo
	Vizolli 82'		Mário Sergio 59'	Stadium: Morumbi; Attendance: 1,352; Referee: Paulo Eduardo Pereira Barjas

10 March First stage 9	XV de Jaú	1–0	São Paulo	Jaú
	Andrei 7'			Stadium: Zezinho Magalhães; Attendance: 2,180; Referee: Ulisses Tavares da Silva Filho

14 March First stage 10	São Paulo	3–2	São Bento	São Paulo
	Marcinho 4'; Flávio 5'; Nelsinho 44'		Gílson Guerreiro 55'; Marcelo Conte 60'	Stadium: Morumbi; Attendance: 1,477; Referee: José Renato de Oliveira Fidalgo

18 March First stage 11	Santo André	1–0	São Paulo	Santo André
	Ivan 86'			Stadium: Bruno José Daniel; Attendance: 5,470; Referee: Flávio de Carvalho

21 March First stage 12	São Paulo	0–1	XV de Piracicaba	São Paulo
			Mauro 59'	Stadium: Morumbi; Attendance: 508; Referee: José Aparecido de Oliveira

25 March First stage 13	Santos	0–1	São Paulo	São Paulo
			Ney Bala 3'	Stadium: Pacaembu; Attendance: 15,622; Referee: Oswaldo dos Santos Ramos

31 March First stage 14	Mogi Mirim	1–0	São Paulo	Mogi Mirim
	Marcelinho 11'			Stadium: Vail Chaves; Attendance: 4,529; Referee: Wilson Carlos dos Santos

8 April First stage 15	São Paulo	0–0	Corinthians	São Paulo
				Stadium: Morumbi; Attendance: 71,286; Referee: José Aparecido de Oliveira

15 April First stage 16	São Paulo	0–2	Palmeiras	São Paulo
			Dida 41'; Mirandinha 87'	Stadium: Morumbi; Attendance: 43,465; Referee: Edmundo Lima Filho

18 April First stage 17	São Paulo	4–0	São José	São Paulo
	Mário Tilico 22'; Raí 43'; Anílton 49'; Cafu 52'			Stadium: Morumbi; Attendance: 826; Referee: João Massoneto

21 April First stage 18	Bragantino	0–0	São Paulo	Bragança Paulista
				Stadium: Marcelo Stéfani; Attendance: 10,063; Referee: Renato Marsiglia

25 April First stage 19	Portuguesa	0–2	São Paulo	São Paulo
			Bobô 38'; Edmílson 59'	Stadium: Pacaembu; Attendance: 10,155; Referee: Wilson Carlos dos Santos

29 April First stage 20	União São João	0–0	São Paulo	Araras
				Stadium: Estádio Hermínio Ometto; Attendance: 9,188; Referee: José Roberto Ramiz Wright

2 May First stage 21	São Paulo	1–1	Novorizontino	São Paulo
	Edmílson 34'		Paulo Sergio 12'	Stadium: Morumbi; Attendance: 2,951; Referee: Nilton Carlos Busnello

6 May First stage 22	São Paulo	4–1	Internacional	São Paulo
	Ney Bala 7', 58'; Renatinho 83', 85'		China 73'	Stadium: Morumbi; Attendance: 12,377; Referee: Ulisses Tavares da Silva Filho

12 May First stage 23	Guarani	1–0	São Paulo	Campinas
	Vagner Mancini 79'			Stadium: Brinco de Ouro; Attendance: 4,633; Referee: Dulcídio Wanderley Boschillia

==== Repechage stage ====
Pos	Team	Pld	W	D	L	GF	GA	GD	Pts	Qualification or relegation
1	Botafogo	10	4	6	0	12	5	+7	14	Qualified
2	São Paulo	10	5	3	2	19	9	+10	13	1991 Yellow Group
3	Santo André	10	4	2	4	7	7	0	10	1991 Yellow Group
4	Ponte Preta	10	4	2	4	10	12	−2	10	1991 Yellow Group
5	Inter de Limeira	10	3	4	3	9	9	0	10	1991 Yellow Group

Updated to match(es) played on June 21, 1990. Source: RSSSF.com
Rules for classification: 1) points; 2) wins; 3) goal difference; 4) number of goals scored.

===== Matches =====
20 May Repechage stage 1	São Paulo	2–1	Ponte Preta	São Paulo
	Flávio 27'; Bobô 46'		Vagner 60'	Stadium: Morumbi; Attendance: 2,640; Referee: Oscar Roberto de Godói

24 May Repechage stage 2	Internacional	1–2	São Paulo	Limeira
	China 34'		Bobô 8'; Ronaldão 57'	Stadium: José Levy Sobrinho; Attendance: 3,291; Referee: Wilson Carlos dos Santos

27 May Repechage stage 3	Santo André	1–0	São Paulo	Santo André
	Mané 12'			Stadium: Bruno José Daniel; Attendance: 3,842; Referee: Luís Carlos Antunes

30 May Repechage stage 4	São Paulo	1–1	Botafogo	São Paulo
	Ney Bala 1'		Marcelino 30'	Stadium: Morumbi; Attendance: 2,600; Referee: Paulino de Castro

3 June Repechage stage 5	Noroeste	0–3	São Paulo	Bauru
			Nelsinho 35'; Renatinho 53', 77'	Stadium: Alfredo de Castilho; Attendance: 2,210; Referee: David Sidney Rodrigues Aveiro

6 June Repechage stage 6	Ponte Preta	1–3	São Paulo	Campinas
	Ernâni 79'		Anílton 24'; Ney Bala 44'; Renatinho 87'	Stadium: Moisés Lucarelli; Attendance: 6,524; Referee: Ulisses Tavares da Silva Filho

10 June Repechage stage 7	São Paulo	1–1	Internacional	São Paulo
	Cafu 58'		João Renato 14'	Stadium: Morumbi; Attendance: 2,225; Referee: João Paulo Araújo

13 June Repechage stage 8	São Paulo	0–1	Santo André	São Paulo
			Chaléu 62'	Stadium: Morumbi; Attendance: 600; Referee: Renato Giglio

17 June Repechage stage 9	Botafogo	1–1	São Paulo	Ribeirão Preto
	Vidotti 81'		Ney Bala 71'	Stadium: Santa Cruz; Attendance: 10,550; Referee: Dulcídio Wanderley Boschillia

20 June Repechage stage 10	São Paulo	6–1	Noroeste	São Paulo
	Marcinho 23'; Betinho 50', 73'; Flávio 61'; Bernardo 80', 88'		Dumba 83'	Stadium: Morumbi; Attendance: 247; Referee: Nilton Carlos Busnello

==== Record ====
Final Position	Points	Matches	Wins	Draws	Losses	Goals For	Goals Away	Win%
15th	36	33	13	10	10	41	26	54%

=== Copa do Brasil ===
==== Round of 64 ====
26 June 1990 1	União Bandeirante	0–1	São Paulo FC	Bandeirante
			Ronaldão 41'	Stadium: Estádio Luís Meneghel; Attendance: 3,502; Referee: Luís Cunha Martins

27 June 1989	São Paulo FC	2–0	União Bandeirante	São Paulo
	Carrasco 76', 85'			Stadium: Morumbi; Attendance: 408; Referee: Dalmo Bozzano

==== Round of 32 ====
2 August 1	Grêmio	1–1	São Paulo	Porto Alegre
	Vilson 27'		Aguirre 48'	Stadium: Beira-Rio; Attendance: 5,645; Referee: Dalmo Bozzano

5 August 2	São Paulo FC	0–0	Grêmio	São Paulo
				Stadium: Morumbi; Attendance: 6,501; Referee: Luís Carlos Félix

==== Eightfinals ====
22 August Round of 16	Criciúma	2–0	São Paulo FC	Criciúma
	Wilson; Jairo Lenzi 83'			Stadium: Heriberto Hulse; Attendance: 6,703; Referee: Luiz Cunha Martins

5 September Round of 16	São Paulo	1–0	Criciúma	São Paulo
	Aguirre 37'			Stadium: Morumbi; Attendance: 1,907; Referee: Cláudio Gonçalves Garcia

==== Record ====
Final Position	Points	Matches	Wins	Draws	Losses	Goals For	Goals Away	Win%
6th	8	6	3	2	1	5	3	66%

=== Campeonato Brasileiro ===
==== League table ====
Pos	Team	Pld	W	D	L	GF	GA	GD	Pts	Qualification or relegation
1	Grêmio	19	9	7	3	25	13	+12	25	Advances to the Quarterfinals
2	Atlético Mineiro	19	7	9	3	19	16	+3	23	Advances to the Quarterfinals
3	São Paulo	19	8	6	5	20	14	+6	22	Advances to the Quarterfinals
4	Corinthians	19	8	6	5	17	18	−1	22	Advances to the Quarterfinals
5	Bahia	19	7	8	4	20	12	+8	22	Advances to the Quarterfinals

===== Matches =====
18 August Round 1	São Paulo	1–2	Atlético Mineiro	São Paulo
	Aguirre 36'		Tato 4'; Gilberto Costa 10'	Stadium: Parque Antarctica; Attendance: 6,189; Referee: Cláudio Vinícius Cerdeira

29 August Round 2	Santos	1–0	São Paulo	Santos, São Paulo
	César Sampaio 84'			Stadium: Vila Belmiro; Attendance: 5,471; Referee: José Aparecido de Oliveira

2 September Round 3	São Paulo	1–0	Bragantino	São Paulo
	Aguirre 72'			Stadium: Morumbi; Attendance: 2,419; Referee: Flávio de Carvalho

9 September Round 4	Portuguesa	1–2	São Paulo	São Paulo
	Sinval 7'		Antônio Carlos 6'; Cafu 65'	Stadium: Canindé; Attendance: 6,331; Referee: Joaquim Carlos Caetano

16 September Round 5	São Paulo	0–1	Goiás	São Paulo
			Túlio 86'	Stadium: Morumbi; Attendance: 3,957; Referee: José Mocellin

20 September Round 6	Internacional-RS	1–2	São Paulo	Porto Alegre
	Letelier 43'		Ronaldão 4'; Raí 36'	Stadium: Estádio Beira-Rio; Attendance: 4,417; Referee: Léo Feldman

23 September Round 7	São Paulo	1–1	Corinthians	São Paulo
	Mário Tilico 73'		Neto 77'	Stadium: Morumbi; Attendance: 18,049; Referee: Márcio Rezende de Freitas

29 September Round 8	Bahia	2–2	São Paulo	Salvador
	Charles 67'; Jorginho 83'		Aguirre 53'; Alcindo 63'	Stadium: Fonte Nova; Attendance: 24,905; Referee: Edson Resende

4 October Round 9	São Paulo	0–0	Vasco da Gama	São Paulo
				Stadium: Morumbi; Attendance: 4,232; Referee: Wilson Carlos dos Santos

7 October Round 10	Botafogo	1–0	São Paulo	Rio de Janeiro
	Valdeir 55'			Stadium: Maracanã; Attendance: 20,350; Referee: José Mocellin

10 October Round 11	São Paulo	1–0	Internacional-SP	São Paulo
	Gilmar Popoca 80'			Stadium: Morumbi; Attendance: 1,681; Referee: David Sidnei Rodrigues Aveiro

14 October Round 12	São José	0–0	São Paulo	São José dos Campos
				Stadium: Martins Pereira; Attendance: 3,721; Referee: Ilton José da Costa

21 October Round 13	São Paulo	1–2	Palmeiras	São Paulo
	Bernardo 83'		Careca Bianchezi 9'; Betinho 24'	Stadium: Morumbi; Attendance: 12,674; Referee: José Aparecido de Oliveira

24 October Round 14	São Paulo	4–0	Vitória	São Paulo
	Eliel 2', 32', 34'; Raí 75'			Stadium: Morumbi; Attendance: 1,198; Referee: Cláudio Vinícius Cerdeira

28 October Round 15	Flamengo	0–1	São Paulo	Juiz de Fora
			Raí 74'	Stadium: Mário Helênio; Attendance: 8,102; Referee: José Mocellin

4 November Round 16	Cruzeiro	1–2	São Paulo	Belo Horizonte
	Luís Fernando 36'		Mário Tilico 38'; Iván Rocha 46'	Stadium: Mineirão; Attendance: 18,538; Referee: José Roberto Ramiz Wright

10 November Round 17	São Paulo	0–0	Fluminense	São Paulo
				Stadium: Morumbi; Attendance: 6,840; Referee: Wilson Carlos dos Santos

15 November Round 18	São Paulo	1–0	Grêmio	São Paulo
	Elivélton 51'			Stadium: Morumbi; Attendance: 10,920; Referee: Dalmo Bozzano

18 November Round 19	Náutico	1–1	São Paulo	Recife
	Bizu 66'		Eliel 35'	Stadium: Aflitos; Attendance: 3,285; Referee: Márcio Rezende de Freitas

==== Quarterfinals ====
24 November Quarterfinals	Santos	0–1	São Paulo	Santos
			Mário Tilico 41'	Stadium: Vila Belmiro; Attendance: 19,389; Referee: Joaquim Santos Filho

1 December Quarterfinals	São Paulo	1–1	Santos	São Paulo
	Eliel 82'		Paulinho McLaren 6'	Stadium: Morumbi; Attendance: 44,298; Referee: Wilson Carlos dos Santos

==== Semifinals ====
5 December Semifinals	São Paulo	2–0	Grêmio	São Paulo
	Raí 8', 19'			Stadium: Morumbi; Attendance: 39,227; Referee: Márcio Rezende de Freitas

8 December Semifinals	Grêmio	1–0	São Paulo	Porto Alegre
	Maurício 49'			Stadium: Olímpico; Referee: Wilson Carlos dos Santos

==== Finals ====
13 December Finals	São Paulo	0–1	Corinthians	São Paulo
			Wilson Mano 4'	Stadium: Morumbi; Attendance: 85,463; Referee: José Aparecido de Oliveira

16 December Finals	Corinthians	1–0	São Paulo	São Paulo
	Tupãzinho 54'			Stadium: Morumbi; Attendance: 100,858; Referee: Edmundo Lima Filho

==== Record ====
Final Position	Points	Matches	Wins	Draws	Losses	Goals For	Goals Away	Win%
2nd	27	25	10	7	8	24	18	54%
