= 1989 Campeonato Brasileiro Série A =

Campeonato Brasileiro Série A
- Season: 1989
- Champions: Vasco da Gama (2nd title)
- Relegated: Atlético Paranaense; Guarani; Sport Recife; Coritiba
- Copa Libertadores: Vasco da Gama; Grêmio

The 1989 Campeonato Brasileiro Série A was the 33rd edition of the Campeonato Brasileiro Série A. The competition was won by Vasco da Gama.

== Format ==
First Stage
The 22 clubs were divided in 2 groups of 11 teams each, playing against the other teams of their respective groups once. The 8 best placed teams of each group qualified to the Second Stage, while the 3 last placed teams of each group competed in the Relegation Tournament.

Second Stage
The 16 qualified clubs were divided in two groups of 8 teams each, playing once against the other group teams. The points of this stage and of the first stage were summed. The champion of each group qualified to the final.

Relegation Tournament
The 6 clubs eliminated in the First Stage played against each other twice. The 4 last placed teams were relegated to the following year's Série B.

Final
It was played between the champions of the two Second Stage groups. The two clubs played a maximum of 2 matches, but the club with the best performance in the competition had the option to choose where the first match would be played, and also need only two points (one victory or two draws) to be declared as the competition champions.

== Standings ==
=== First stage ===
Group A
Pos	Team	Pld	W	D	L	GF	GA	GD	Pts	Qualification
1	Corinthians	10	6	2	2	11	6	+5	14	Second Stage
2	Botafogo	10	4	3	3	10	8	+2	11	Second Stage
3	Atlético Mineiro	10	3	5	2	13	8	+5	11	Second Stage
4	Náutico	10	4	2	4	16	16	0	10	Second Stage
5	Internacional-SP	10	3	4	3	8	8	0	10	Second Stage
6	Flamengo	10	3	4	3	6	7	−1	10	Second Stage
7	São Paulo	10	2	6	2	11	11	0	10	Second Stage
8	Internacional-RS	10	3	3	4	6	6	0	9	Second Stage
9	Guarani	10	3	3	4	7	8	−1	9	Relegation Tournament
10	Atlético-PR	10	2	5	3	9	10	−1	9	Relegation Tournament
11	Vitória	10	2	3	5	4	13	−9	7	Relegation Tournament

Group B
Pos	Team	Pld	W	D	L	GF	GA	GD	Pts	Qualification
1	Palmeiras	10	6	2	2	13	5	+8	14	Second Stage
2	Vasco	10	5	4	1	14	7	+7	14	Second Stage
3	Portuguesa	10	3	5	2	12	7	+5	11	Second Stage
4	Grêmio	10	4	2	4	11	11	0	10	Second Stage
5	Goiás	10	4	2	4	10	12	−2	10	Second Stage
6	Fluminense	10	4	2	4	9	10	−1	10	Second Stage
7	Cruzeiro	10	3	4	3	8	8	0	10	Second Stage
8	Santos	10	2	5	3	6	7	−1	9	Second Stage
9	Sport	10	3	2	5	9	12	−3	8	Relegation Tournament
10	Bahia	10	1	3	6	9	17	−8	5	Relegation Tournament
11	Coritiba	10	3	3	4	10	15	−5	4 (Note: Coritiba forfeited the match against Santos, thus was punished with a 1-0 defeat, plus the loss of 5 points and the elimination of the competition.)	Relegation Tournament

=== Second stage ===
Group A
Pos	Team	Pld	W	D	L	GF	GA	GD	Pts	Qualification
1	São Paulo	18	7	9	2	25	15	+10	23	Qualified to the final
2	Botafogo	18	9	4	5	20	16	+4	22	
3	Corinthians	18	8	5	5	15	13	+2	21	
4	Atlético Mineiro	18	6	7	5	21	13	+8	19	
5	Flamengo	18	6	7	5	16	13	+3	19	
6	Náutico	18	5	5	8	27	34	−7	15	
7	Internacional-SP	18	4	7	7	13	19	−6	15	
8	Internacional-RS	18	4	5	9	14	19	−5	13	

Group B
Pos	Team	Pld	W	D	L	GF	GA	GD	Pts	Qualification
1	Vasco	18	8	8	2	26	16	+10	24	Qualified for the final
2	Cruzeiro	18	9	5	4	23	14	+9	23	
3	Palmeiras	18	8	6	4	21	13	+8	22	
4	Portuguesa	18	7	6	5	21	13	+8	20	
5	Goiás	18	6	6	6	17	21	−4	18	
6	Grêmio	18	6	5	7	19	19	0	17	
7	Santos	18	5	6	7	13	16	−3	16	
8	Fluminense	18	5	4	9	15	25	−10	14	

=== Relegation tournament ===
Team	Pld	W	D	L	GF	GA	GD	Pts	Relegation
Vitória	8	4	2	2	10	7	+3	10	
Bahia	8	3	4	1	6	5	+1	10	
Atlético-PR	8	2	6	0	9	3	+6	10	Relegated to Série B 1990
Guarani	8	2	3	3	8	10	−2	7	Relegated to Série B 1990
Sport	8	0	3	5	3	11	−8	3	Relegated to Série B 1990
Coritiba	0	0	0	0	0	0	0	0	Relegated to Série B 1990

=== Final standings ===
Pos	Team	Pld	W	D	L	GF	GA	GD	Pts	Result
1	Vasco	19	9	8	2	27	16	+11	26	Competed in the final
2	São Paulo	19	7	9	3	25	16	+9	23	Competed in the final
3	Cruzeiro	18	9	5	4	23	14	+9	23	Eliminated in the 2nd Stage
4	Botafogo	18	9	4	5	20	16	+4	22	Eliminated in the 2nd Stage
5	Palmeiras	18	8	6	4	21	13	+8	22	Eliminated in the 2nd Stage
6	Corinthians	18	8	5	5	15	13	+2	21	Eliminated in the 2nd Stage
7	Portuguesa	18	7	6	5	21	13	+8	20	Eliminated in the 2nd Stage
8	Atlético Mineiro	18	6	7	5	21	13	+8	19	Eliminated in the 2nd Stage
9	Flamengo	18	6	7	5	16	13	+3	19	Eliminated in the 2nd Stage
10	Goiás	18	6	6	6	17	21	−4	18	Eliminated in the 2nd Stage
11	Grêmio	18	6	5	7	19	19	0	17	Eliminated in the 2nd Stage
12	Santos	18	5	6	7	13	16	−3	16	Eliminated in the 2nd Stage
13	Náutico	18	5	5	8	27	34	−7	15	Eliminated in the 2nd Stage
14	Internacional-SP	18	4	7	7	13	19	−6	15	Eliminated in the 2nd Stage
15	Fluminense	18	5	4	9	15	25	−10	14	Eliminated in the 2nd Stage
16	Internacional-RS	18	4	5	9	14	19	−5	13	Eliminated in the 2nd Stage
17	Vitória	18	6	5	7	14	20	−6	17 (Note: Due to Coritiba's elimination, only 5 clubs competed in the Relegation Tournament, being relegated Atlético-PR, Guarani and Sport (plus Coritiba). According to the league rules, the last clubs standings only take in consideration this tournament results, but the points listed in the standings also include the First Stage.)	Eliminated in the 1st stage
18	Bahia	18	4	7	7	15	22	−7	15	Eliminated in the 1st stage
19	Atlético-PR	18	4	11	3	18	13	+5	19	Eliminated in the 1st stage
20	Guarani	18	5	6	7	15	18	−3	16	Eliminated in the 1st stage
21	Sport	18	3	5	10	12	23	−11	11	Eliminated in the 1st stage
22	Coritiba	10	3	3	4	10	15	−5	4 (Note: Coritiba forfeited the match against Santos, thus was punished with a 1-0 defeat, plus the loss of 5 points and the elimination of the competition.)	Eliminated in the 1st stage

== The final ==
December 16, 1989

São Paulo	0 – 1	Vasco
		Sorato 50'

Morumbi, São Paulo
Attendance: 71,552
Referee: Wilson Carlos dos Santos

São Paulo: Gilmar; Netinho, Adílson, Ricardo Rocha and Nelsinho; Flávio, Bobô and Raí; Mário Tilico, Ney and Edivaldo (Paulo César). Head coach: Carlos Alberto Silva.

Vasco: Acácio; Luiz Carlos Winck, Quiñónez, Marco Aurélio and Mazinho; Zé do Carmo, Marco Antônio Boiadeiro and Bismarck; Sorato, Bebeto and William. Head coach: Nelsinho Rosa.

- The second leg of the final was not played as Vasco had a better season record and won the first leg.
