= Cafu =

Brazilian football player (born 1970)

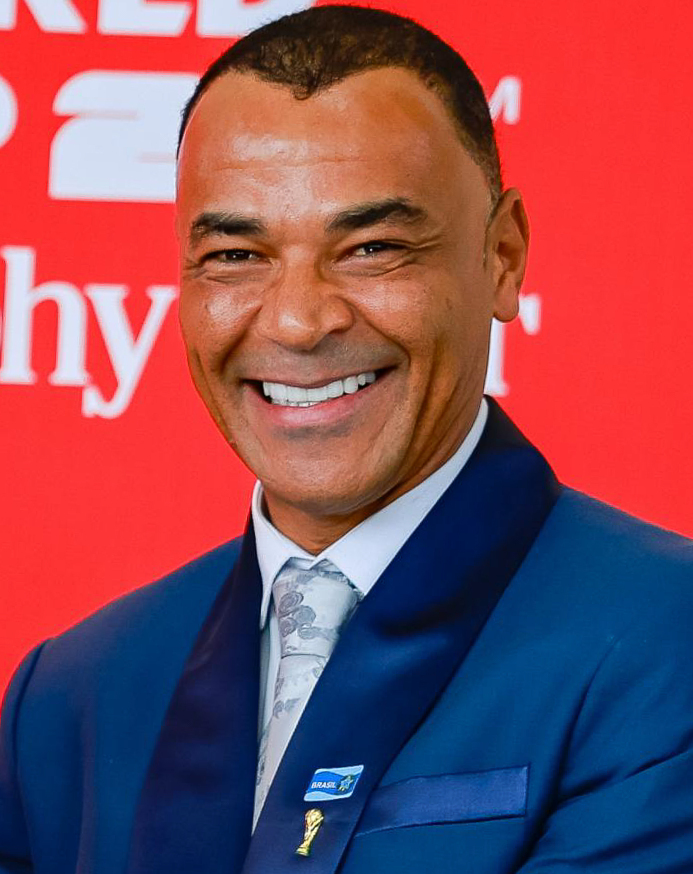
- Cafu in 2026

Personal information
- Full name: Marcos Evangelista de Morais
- Date of birth: 7 June 1970 (age 56)
- Place of birth: Itaquaquecetuba, São Paulo, Brazil
- Height: 1.76 m (5 ft 9 in)
- Position: Right-back

Youth career
- Portuguesa
- Juventus-SP
- 1988–1990: São Paulo

Senior career*
Years	Team	Apps	(Gls)
1989–1994	São Paulo	216	(33)
1995	Zaragoza	16	(0)
1995	Juventude	2	(0)
1995–1997	Palmeiras	41	(2)
1997–2003	Roma	163	(5)
2003–2008	AC Milan	119	(4)
Total		557	(44)

International career
1990–2006	Brazil	142	(5)
Medal record
Men's football
Representing Brazil
FIFA World Cup
Winner	1994 United States
Winner	2002 Korea/Japan
Runner-up	1998 France
Copa América
Winner	1997 Bolivia
Winner	1999 Paraguay
Runner-up	1991 Chile
FIFA Confederations Cup
Winner	1997 Saudi Arabia
- * Club domestic league appearances and goals

Marcos Evangelista de Morais (born 7 June 1970), known as Cafu ([kaˈfu]), is a Brazilian former professional footballer who played as a right-back. Widely regarded as one of the greatest full-backs of all time, he was known for his pace and energetic attacking runs along the right flank. He is the most-capped player for the Brazil national team with 142 appearances.

At club level, Cafu won several domestic and international titles while playing in Brazil, Spain, and Italy; he is best known for his spells at São Paulo (1989–1995), Roma (1997–2003), and AC Milan (2003–08), teams with which he made history, although he also played briefly for Zaragoza, Juventude, and Palmeiras during a two-year spell from 1995 to 1997. In 1994, Cafu was crowned South American Footballer of the Year, and in 2004, was named by Pelé in the FIFA 100 list of the world's greatest living players. He was additionally named in the FIFPro World XI in 2005, and in 2020 was included in the Ballon d'Or Dream Team.

Cafu represented his nation in four FIFA World Cups between 1994 and 2006. He was the first player in history to have appeared in three World Cup finals, followed by Lionel Messi reaching the 2014, 2022 and 2026 finals, the only player to date to reach three consecutive finals and one of only 21 players to have won the World Cup more than once, winning the 1994 and 2002 editions of the tournament, the latter as his team's captain where he lifted the World Cup trophy. He is one of only two professionals who won the World Cup in two different centuries. With Brazil, he also took part in four editions of the Copa América, winning the title twice, in 1997 and 1999; he was also a member of the national side that won the 1997 FIFA Confederations Cup.

== Early life ==
One of six children, Cafu was raised in the Jardim Irene favela of São Paulo. At the age of seven, he was able to attend a football academy and soon moved up to the junior sides of Nacional-SP, Portuguesa, and Itaquaquecetuba. He also played futsal for two years.

As a child, he received the nickname 'Cafu', in honor of the Brazilian winger Cafuringa.

In the early 1980s, he was rejected from the youth squads of Corinthians, Palmeiras, Santos, Atlético Mineiro, and Portuguesa, but it was not until 1988 that he made the youth squad of hometown club São Paulo, and subsequently won the Copa São Paulo youth tournament that year, but he did not play during the next season as São Paulo won the 1989 Campeonato Paulista.

== Club career ==
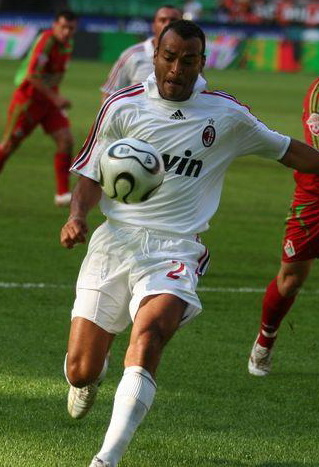
Cafu playing for AC Milan

=== Early career ===
It was during this time, however, that São Paulo youth coach Telê Santana became Cafu's mentor. He suggested that Cafu move from right midfield to wingback, a spot into which Cafu made the transition with ease despite never previously playing the position. He had soon anchored onto the first team, as São Paulo won back-to-back Copa Libertadores and Intercontinental Cup in 1992 and 1993. In 1994, he was named the South American Footballer of the Year. Halfway through the 1994–95 season, Cafu joined Spanish side Real Zaragoza, winning the 1995 Cup Winners' Cup with them (though he had injury issues and did not play in the final). He then left Zaragoza to join Brazilian club Juventude.

=== Rise to prominence and success ===
==== 1997-98: Debut at AS Roma ====
After a brief stint back in Brazil with Palmeiras in 1996, Cafu returned to Europe once again the next year, this time with AS Roma, signing a deal worth 14,7 billion Italian lire (€7.6 million). On 31 August 1997, he made his debut for the club in a league game against Hellas Verona, delivering an assist in that game. Under manager Zdeněk Zeman, he quickly earned his place in the starting XI and led the club to a fourth-place finish in Serie A, qualifying them for the UEFA Cup. In total, Cafu made 36 appearances, scoring his only goal in a league match against Inter Milan on 11 April 1998.

==== 1998-2001: Starting XI and European success ====
After a stellar FIFA World Cup, where he reached the final and only lost out to host nation France, Cafu continued to be a crucial member of the Giallorossi, despite missing out on multiple matches. The team finished in 6th place and reached the quarterfinals of the UEFA Cup, only losing out to Atlético Madrid 4–2 on aggregate. In 1999–2000, manager Zeman left and was replaced by Fabio Capello, but Cafu remained an integral member. He still led the club into European slots, placing 6th, and won the Scudetto the following year, helping the club in a dense title race with Lazio and Juventus.

==== 2001-2003: Final years in Rome and move to AC Milan ====
In the 2001–02 season, Roma played in the UEFA Champions League, since they won the league the year before. And Cafu made a big impact as a starter, giving the club crucial points by scoring the matchwinner in a game against Lokomotiv Moscow on 16 October 2001. And despite Roma was eliminated in the following round, he still helped them reach runner-up to Juventus. After captaining Brazil to the title in the 2002 FIFA World Cup, Cafu was still ever-present, and although he missed six of the last seven league matches, he made an impact, helping Roma finish 8th and still reach the Coppa Italia final.

That summer, he moved to AC Milan, after turning down a move to Japan with Yokohama F. Marinos. With the Rossoneri, he won his second career Scudetto in 2004, followed by his second Supercoppa Italiana, and he played in his first UEFA Champions League final in 2005. The following season, he made fewer appearances for Milan due to injury and difficulties in his personal life.

Despite his success with Milan, he continued to hold fond memories of his Roma years, and it was for that reason that on 4 March 2007 – the day after Milan eliminated Celtic in the first knockout round of the 2006–07 UEFA Champions League – he candidly revealed in a UEFA.com chat that he did not want Milan to be drawn against the Giallorossi in the quarter-final round. He got his wish, as Milan were drawn against Bayern Munich. Milan's successful Champions League campaign saw Cafu finally pick up a long-awaited winners' medal, in a rematch of the 2005 final.

Cafu signed a contract extension in May 2007 that would keep him with Milan until the end of the 2007–08 season, during which he won another UEFA Supercup, and his third world title at club level and now his first FIFA Club World Cup. On 16 May 2008, it was announced that Cafu and compatriot Serginho would be leaving Milan at the end of the season. In Cafu's last game of his Milan career, and of his professional career, he scored a goal in their 4–1 victory over Udinese. Milan vice-president Adriano Galliani stated that the door would be open to him to return to work for the club.

He is a member of the AC Milan and the Roma Halls of Fame.

=== Passport controversy ===
Cafu was accused along with several other Serie A players, including Roma teammate Fábio Júnior and Gustavo Bartelt, countryman and later Milan teammate Dida, of using a forged passport in their attempt to dodge regulations regarding the number of non-European players allowed on Italian club rosters. However, the charge was cleared by the Italian Football Federation (FIGC) as Cafu's Italian passport was real and issued by Italian officials, but 13 others – including Dida – were banned. But Cafu faced another controversy that similar to Juan Sebastián Verón, accused that Cafu's wife, Regina used falsified documents to claim Italian nationality through Italian descent. Cafu acquired Italian nationality through marriage. In 2004, Cafu and Roma club president Franco Sensi went to court.

On 12 June 2006, less than 24 hours before Brazil were to begin their 2006 World Cup campaign against Croatia, Rome prosecutor Angelantonio Racanelli called for the imprisonment of Cafu, his wife and his agent for nine months following the resurfacing of a false-passport scandal. The very next day, however, Cafu, his wife and agent were acquitted of all charges.

== International career ==
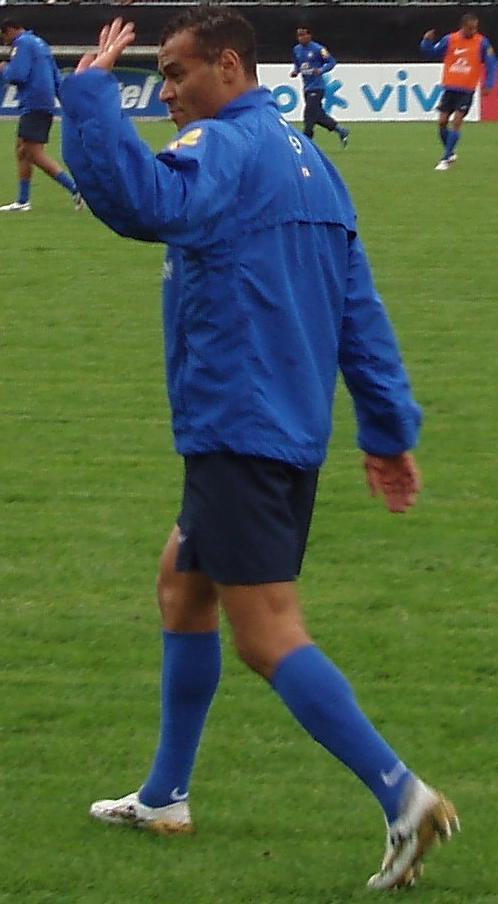
Cafu training with Brazil before the 2006 World Cup

Cafu is the most-capped Brazilian men's player of all time with 142 appearances, including a record 20 World Cup games. He has won two World Cups in 1994 and 2002, as well as being the only player to participate in three consecutive World Cup final matches. Cafu also held the record of winning the most matches in World Cups with 15 (along with two games Brazil won on penalties), before being surpassed by Germany's Miroslav Klose in the 2014 World Cup.

He earned his first cap in a friendly against Spain on 12 September 1990, and played sparingly for Brazil in the early 1990s, making the 1994 World Cup roster as a substitute. He appeared in the final against Italy, following an injury to Jorginho in the 22nd minute. After that, Cafu was soon a regular in the starting eleven as Brazil won the Copa América in 1997 and 1999, the 1997 FIFA Confederations Cup, and reached the 1998 World Cup final.

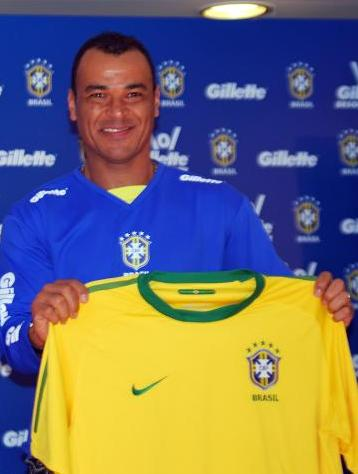
Cafu at a Gillette promotion with Brazil in 2010

Brazil endured a rocky qualification for the 2002 tournament, during which Cafu came under heavy criticism from coach Vanderlei Luxemburgo, who stripped him of the team captaincy after he was sent off in a qualifier against Paraguay. Shortly after that, however, Luxemburgo was out of a job, and replacement Luiz Felipe Scolari made Emerson his new choice for captain. However, Emerson missed the cut after he dislocated his shoulder in training, which allowed Cafu to regain the armband. After Brazil defeated Germany 2–0 in the final match (Cafu's third consecutive World Cup final), he stood on the victory podium during the postmatch celebration and, as he raised the World Cup trophy, shouted to his wife, "Regina, eu te amo!" ("Regina, I love you!"). Cafu had also written "100% Jardim Irene" on his shirt as an homage to his upbringing. Three days after World Cup victory, Cafu spent some time in Bangu on Amanajó Street alongside former Bangu AC coach and notable fan Pombo and his cousin, a long time Cafu's friend.

Cafu and Brazil fell short of high expectations placed on the squad four years later in 2006, as Brazil meekly exited in the quarter-finals after a 1–0 defeat by France. Coach Carlos Alberto Parreira was criticized for featuring fading veterans, most notably the 36-year-old Cafu and 33-year-old Roberto Carlos, in the starting eleven in lieu of younger players. Cafu was one of few Brazil players who spoke to the press in the midst of a hailstorm of criticism from Brazilian fans and media alike following the team's return home.

== Style of play ==
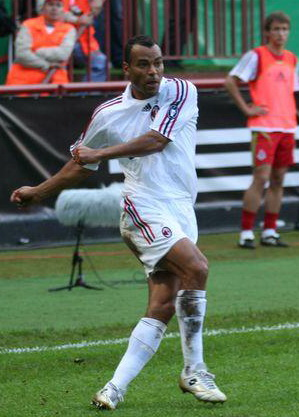
Cafu (pictured with Milan in 2007) was known for his great ability to attack and defend as a right back

Cafu is regarded as one of the best right-backs in the world during his career, as well as one of the best-ranked footballers. Cafu was an attacking full-back before it became common, influencing future players Dani Alves, Trent Alexander-Arnold, and Achraf Hakimi. He was well known for his incredible ability and stamina, as well as his ability to make overlapping attacking runs down the right flank and provide accurate crosses to teammates in the area.

In addition to his footballing ability, he was also known for his discipline, leadership, and his characteristically cheerful demeanor. Although he usually played as an attacking right-back, he was also capable of playing as a centre-back, due to his defensive skills, or in more advanced positions, and was often deployed as a right winger. During his time in Italy, he was given the nickname Pendolino, after the country's express trains.

== Personal life ==
Cafu is separated from his wife Regina Feliciano, whom he married in 1987. The couple had three children together: two sons (Danilo and Wellington) and a daughter (Michelle). On 4 September 2019, Danilo suffered a heart attack whilst playing football at his family home, after complaining about feeling unwell. Danilo was taken to a hospital where he later died.

For the 2018 Brazilian general election, Cafu supported Jair Bolsonaro.

== Career statistics ==
=== Club ===
Appearances and goals by club, season and competition
Club	Season	League			State league (Note: Includes Campeonato Paulista)		National cup (Note: Includes Copa do Brasil, Copa del Rey, Coppa Italia)		Continental		Other		Total	
Club	Season	Division	Apps	Goals	Apps	Goals	Apps	Goals	Apps	Goals	Apps	Goals	Apps	Goals
São Paulo	1989	Série A	3	0	0	0	0	0	0	0	0	0	3	0
São Paulo	1990	Série A	20	1	21	3	4	0	0	0	1	1	45	5
São Paulo	1991	Série A	20	1	31	3	0	0	0	0	0	0	52	4
São Paulo	1992	Série A	21	1	22	4	0	0	16	0	0	0	59	5
São Paulo	1993	Série A	18	1	27	14	2	0	19	3	2	1	68	19
São Paulo	1994	Série A	16	3	17	2	0	0	12	0	0	0	45	5
São Paulo	Total		98	7	118	26	6	0	47	3	3	2	272	38
Zaragoza	1994–95	La Liga	16	0	—		2	0	1 (Note: Appearance in UEFA Cup Winners' Cup)	0	—		19	0
Juventude	1995	Série A	0	0	2	0							2	0
Palmeiras	1995	Série A	19	0									19	0
Palmeiras	1996	Série A	22	2			7	2					29	4
Palmeiras	1997	Série A	0	0									0	0
Palmeiras	Total		41	2			7	2					48	4
Roma	1997–98	Serie A	31	1	—		5	0	—		—		36	1
Roma	1998–99	Serie A	20	1	—		0	0	5 (Note: Appearances in UEFA Cup)	0	—		25	1
Roma	1999–2000	Serie A	28	2	—		4	0	5	0	—		37	2
Roma	2000–01	Serie A	31	1	—		2	0	7	0	—		40	1
Roma	2001–02	Serie A	27	0	—		1	0	10 (Note: Appearances in UEFA Champions League)	2	0	0	38	2
Roma	2002–03	Serie A	26	0	—		3	1	12	0	—		41	1
Roma	Total		163	5	—		15	1	39	2	0	0	217	8
AC Milan	2003–04	Serie A	28	1	—		1	0	9	0	3 (Note: One appearance in Supercoppa Italiana, one appearance in UEFA Super Cup, one appearance in Intercontinental Cup)	0	41	1
AC Milan	2004–05	Serie A	33	1	—		0	0	12	0	1 (Note: Appearance in Supercoppa Italiana)	0	46	1
AC Milan	2005–06	Serie A	19	1	—		1	0	5	0	—		25	1
AC Milan	2006–07	Serie A	24	0	—		3	0	8	0	—		35	0
AC Milan	2007–08	Serie A	15	1	—		2	0	1	0	1 (Note: Appearance in FIFA Club World Cup)	0	19	1
AC Milan	Total		119	4	—		7	0	35	0	5	0	166	4
Career total			437	18	120	26	37	3	122	5	8	2	724	54

=== International ===
Appearances and goals by national team and year
National team	Year	Apps	Goals
Brazil	1990	3	0
Brazil	1991	9	0
Brazil	1992	2	0
Brazil	1993	12	0
Brazil	1994	7	1
Brazil	1995	5	0
Brazil	1996	3	0
Brazil	1997	20	0
Brazil	1998	12	2
Brazil	1999	12	1
Brazil	2000	10	1
Brazil	2001	6	0
Brazil	2002	12	0
Brazil	2003	7	0
Brazil	2004	9	0
Brazil	2005	8	0
Brazil	2006	5	0
Total		142	5

Scores and results list Brazil's goal tally first, score column indicates score after each Cafu goal.

List of international goals scored by Cafu
No.	Date	Venue	Opponent	Score	Result	Competition
1	8 June 1994	Jack Murphy Stadium, San Diego, United States	Honduras	6–2	8–2	Friendly
2	3 June 1998	Stade Bauer, Saint-Ouen, France	Andorra	3–0	3–0	Friendly
3	14 October 1998	Robert F. Kennedy Stadium, Washington, D.C., United States	Ecuador	3–1	5–1	Friendly
4	9 October 1999	Amsterdam ArenA, Amsterdam, Netherlands	Netherlands	2–2	2–2	Friendly
5	23 May 2000	Millennium Stadium, Cardiff, Wales	Wales	2–0	3–0	Friendly

== Honours ==
São Paulo

- Campeonato Brasileiro Série A: 1991
- Campeonato Paulista: 1991, 1992
- Copa Libertadores: 1992, 1993
- Supercopa Libertadores: 1993
- Recopa Sudamericana: 1993, 1994
- Intercontinental Cup: 1992, 1993

Real Zaragoza

- UEFA Cup Winners' Cup: 1994–95

Palmeiras

- Campeonato Paulista: 1996

Roma

- Serie A: 2000–01

AC Milan

- Serie A: 2003–04
- Supercoppa Italiana: 2004
- UEFA Champions League: 2006–07
- UEFA Super Cup: 2003, 2007
- FIFA Club World Cup: 2007

Brazil

- FIFA World Cup: 1994, 2002, runner up: 1998
- Copa América: 1997, 1999
- FIFA Confederations Cup: 1997

Individual

- South American Team of the Year: 1992, 1993, 1994, 1995
- South American Footballer of the Year: 1994
- FIFA World Cup All-Star Team: 2002 (Reserve)
- FIFA World Cup Fans' All-Star Team: 2002
- FIFA 100
- UEFA Team of the Year: 2004, 2005
- FIFPro World XI: 2005
- Sports Illustrated Team of the Decade: 2009
- ESPN World Team of the Decade: 2009
- AS Roma Hall of Fame: 2012
- World Soccer Greatest XI of all time: 2013
- AC Milan Hall of Fame
- World XI: Team of the 21st Century
- Ballon d'Or Dream Team: 2020
- IFFHS All-time Men's Dream Team: 2021
- IFFHS South America Men's Team of All Time: 2021

=== Orders ===
- Officer of the Order of Rio Branco: 2008

== See also ==
- List of footballers with 100 or more caps
