= Ítalo Pica-Pau =

Brazilian footballer

Personal information
- Full name: Francisco Ítalo de Sousa Correia
- Date of birth: 3 January 1995 (age 31)
- Place of birth: Piripiri, Brazil
- Position: Forward

Youth career
- –2014: 4 de Julho
- 2014: Sport Recife

Senior career*
Years	Team	Apps	(Gls)
2015	Sport Recife		
2015	Central		
2016	4 de Julho		
2017	Três Passos		
2018	Altos		
2019	4 de Julho		
2019	Corumbaense		
2019	Rio Verde		
2020	Artsul		
2020–2022	4 de Julho		
2022	Ferroviário de Parnaíba		
2023	4 de Julho		
2023	Flamengo-PI		
2024	Itapipoca		
2024	Comercial-PI		
2025	Guarani de Juazeiro		
- * Club domestic league appearances and goals as of 3 June 2025

Francisco Ítalo de Sousa Correia (born 3 January 1995), better known as Ítalo Pica-Pau, is a Brazilian professional footballer who plays as a forward.

== Career ==
Formed in the youth categories of the 4 de Julho EC, Ítalo also played for Sport but did not establish himself there. He returned to Piauí football, becoming state champion with Altos in 2018, and with 4 de Julho in 2020. His last club was EC Flamengo, where he played in the 2023 Campeonato Piauiense Second Division.

In 2024 season, Pica-Pau played for Itapipoca-CE and Comercial-PI.

== Honours ==
Altos

- Campeonato Piauiense: 2018

4 de Julho

- Campeonato Piauiense: 2020
