= Mazinho Loiola =

Brazilian footballer

Mazinho Loyola
Personal information
- Full name: Lindomar Ferreira Loiola
- Date of birth: 15 March 1968 (age 58)
- Place of birth: Tauá, Brazil
- Height: 1.70 m (5 ft 7 in)
- Position: Forward

Youth career
- –1987: Ferroviário

Senior career*
Years	Team	Apps	(Gls)
1987–1988	Ferroviário		
1988–1992	São Paulo	30	(8)
1989–1991	→ Santa Cruz (loan)		
1991	→ Ceará (loan)		
1992	→ Fortaleza (loan)		
1992	Rio Branco-SP		
1993	Santa Cruz		
1993–1995	Internacional		
1995	→ Araçatuba (loan)		
1996	Corinthians	14	(1)
1996–1997	Paraná		
1997	Fortaleza		
1998	ABC		
1998	Internacional		
1999	Gama		
1999–2000	União Barbarense		
2000	Avaí		
2001–2003	Fortaleza		
2004	Ferroviário		
- * Club domestic league appearances and goals

Lindomar Ferreira Loiola (born 15 March 1968), better known as Mazinho Loiola or Mazinho Loyola is a Brazilian former professional footballer who played as a forward.

== Career ==
Trained in the youth categories of Ferroviário, Mazinho was state champion with the club in 1988. At the request of coach Cilinho, he was brought to São Paulo FC where he was part of the São Paulo champion squad in 1989. In 1990, he was negotiated with Santa Cruz, being champion again. He played for Ceará SC in 1991 and for rival Fortaleza EC in 1992, one more time winning a state title. He went to Rio Branco de Americana and after standing out, and arrived at SC Internacional. Mazinho won several more state titles until he ended his career in 2004.

== Honours ==
Ferroviário

- Campeonato Cearense: 1988

São Paulo

- Campeonato Paulista: 1989

Santa Cruz

- Campeonato Pernambucano: 1990

Fortaleza

- Campeonato Cearense: 1992, 2001, 2003

Internacional

- Campeonato Gaúcho: 1994

Paraná

- Campeonato Paranaense: 1996, 1997

ABC

- Campeonato Potiguar: 1998

Gama

- Campeonato Brasiliense: 1999
