= Benê (footballer, born 1971) =

Brazilian footballer

Personal information
- Full name: Benedito Aparecido de Oliveira
- Date of birth: 12 February 1971 (age 55)
- Place of birth: São Paulo, Brazil
- Position: Midfielder

Youth career
- –1989: São Paulo

Senior career*
Years	Team	Apps	(Gls)
1989	São Paulo	28	(2)
1990	Internacional		
1991	Embu-Guaçu		
1992–1994	Pelotas		
1994–1999	Ponte Preta		
1999	→ Matonense (loan)		
1999–2000	Figueirense		
2000	Gama		
- * Club domestic league appearances and goals as of 15 October 2023

Benedito Aparecido de Oliveira (born 12 February 1971), better known as Benê, is a Brazilian former professional footballer who played as a midfielder.

== Honours ==
São Paulo

- Campeonato Paulista: 1989
