= 4 de Julho Esporte Clube =

4 de Julho
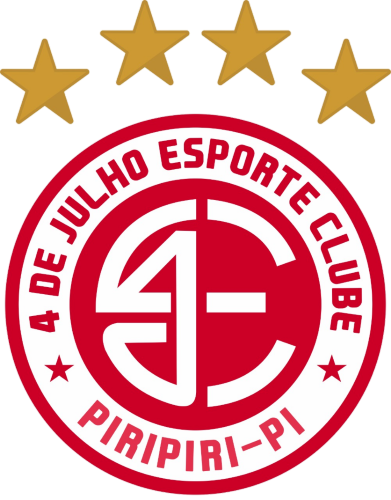
- Full name: 4 de Julho Esporte Clube
- Nicknames: Colorado de Piripiri (Red from Piripiri); Gavião Colorado (Red Hawk)
- Founded: 4 July 1974; 51 years ago
- Ground: Arena Colorada
- Capacity: 4,000
- President: Walter Lima de Souza
- League: Campeonato Piauiense Segunda Divisão
- 2025: Piauiense, 7th of 8 (relegated)
Home colors	Away colors

4 de Julho Esporte Clube, commonly known as 4 de Julho, is a Brazilian football club based in Piripiri, Piauí state. They competed in the Série B once and in the Série C twice.

4 de Julho is the second-best ranked team from Piauí in CBF's national club ranking, behind Altos.

== History ==
The club was founded on 4 July 1974, hence the name 4 de Julho (4 July in English). 4 de Julho won the Campeonato Piauiense in 1992 and in 1993. They competed in the Série B in 1989, when they were eliminated in the First Stage. 4 de Julho was eliminated in the First Stage in the 1993 and in the 1997 editions of the Série C. The club won the Campeonato Piauiense for the third time in 2011, after beating Comercial 1–0 in the first leg of the Final, and a 1–1 draw in the second leg, the games were played respectively on 10 and 17 August.

=== First team squad ===
As of 3 July 2021

Note: Flags indicate national team as defined under FIFA eligibility rules; some limited exceptions apply. Players may hold more than one non-FIFA nationality.

No.	Pos.	Nation	Player
—	GK	BRA	Mirlley Coutinho
—	GK	BRA	Tiago Rocha
—	GK	BRA	Jaílson
—	GK	BRA	Geo
—	GK	BRA	Yan
—	GK	BRA	Vinicius
—	DF	BRA	Gilmar Bahia
—	DF	BRA	Edy
—	DF	BRA	Marcelo
—	DF	BRA	Ricardo Sena
—	DF	BRA	Edinaldo
—	DF	BRA	Lucas Fernandes
—	DF	BRA	Rômulo
—	DF	BRA	Caio César
—	DF	BRA	João Marcelo
—	DF	BRA	Eduardo
—	DF	BRA	Andrey Rafael
—	MF	BRA	Hiltinho
—	MF	BRA	Chico Bala

No.	Pos.	Nation	Player
—	MF	BRA	Vitor Recife
—	MF	BRA	Cinelton
—	MF	BRA	Lucas Pederzoli
—	MF	BRA	Maycon Douglas
—	MF	BRA	Wilsinho
—	MF	BRA	André Victor
—	MF	BRA	Ítalo Pica-Pau
—	MF	BRA	João Pedro
—	MF	BRA	Diguinho
—	MF	BRA	Alex Mineiro
—	MF	BRA	João Grilo
—	FW	BRA	Etinho
—	FW	BRA	Jânio Daniel
—	FW	BRA	Zé Arthur
—	FW	BRA	Índio Potiguar
—	FW	BRA	Kaká

== Honours ==
- Campeonato Piauiense
  - Winners (4): 1992, 1993, 2011, 2020
  - Runners-up (6): 1988, 1989, 1997, 1999, 2000, 2009
- Copa Piauí
  - Winners (1): 2017
- Campeonato Piauiense Second Division
  - Winners (2): 2003, 2016

== Stadium ==
4 de Julho Esporte Clube play their home games at Estádio Municipal Helvídio Nunes de Barros, nicknamed Arena Colorada. The stadium has a maximum capacity of 4,000 people.
