= Vivinho =

Brazilian footballer

Personal information
- Full name: Welvis Dias Marcelino
- Date of birth: March 10, 1961
- Place of birth: Uberlândia, Brazil
- Date of death: September 13, 2015 (aged 54)
- Height: 1.80 m (5 ft 11 in)
- Position: Striker

Senior career*
Years	Team	Apps	(Gls)
1983–1986	Uberlândia	26	(5)
1986–1990	Vasco	54	(13)
1990–1993	Botafogo	52	(4)
1993	Goiás	10	(4)
1994	Uberlândia		
1995	Fortaleza		

International career
1989	Brazil	3	(1)
- * Club domestic league appearances and goals

Welvis Dias Marcelino, better known as Vivinho (March 10, 1961 – September 13, 2015), was an association football striker, who played in several Brazilian Série A clubs.

== History ==
Born in Uberlândia, Vivinho started playing professionally in 1983, defending local club Uberlândia. He played 26 Série A games and scored five goals between 1983 and 1986, winning the Série B in 1984. Vivinho joined Vasco in 1986, playing 54 Série A games and scoring 13 goals. Before leaving Vasco in 1990, he won the Campeonato Carioca in 1987 and in 1988, and the Série A in 1989. Vivinho then joined Vasco's rivals Botafogo, leaving the club in 1993, after having played 52 Série A games and scored four goals. He played 10 Série A games for Goiás in 1993, scoring four goals, then he returned to Uberlândia in 1994, retiring in 1995 after defending Fortaleza.

=== National team ===
Vivinho played three games for the Brazil national team in 1989. The first game was played on March 15, against Ecuador. He scored his only goal for Brazil on April 12, against Paraguay, in his last game for the country.

== Death ==
Vivinho died on 13 September after passing out in his home, he was taken to hospital but did not survive. The cause of death has not been revealed.
