= 1989 in Brazilian football =

Football in Brazil
- Season: 1989

The following article presents a summary of the 1989 football (soccer) season in Brazil, which was the 88th season of competitive football in the country.

== Campeonato Brasileiro Série A ==
Second stage

Group A
Pos	Team	Pld	W	D	L	GF	GA	GD	Pts	Qualification
1	São Paulo	18	7	9	2	25	15	+10	23	Qualified to the final
2	Botafogo	18	9	4	5	20	16	+4	22	
3	Corinthians	18	8	5	5	15	13	+2	21	
4	Atlético Mineiro	18	6	7	5	21	13	+8	19	
5	Flamengo	18	6	7	5	16	13	+3	19	
6	Náutico	18	5	5	8	27	34	−7	15	
7	Internacional-SP	18	4	7	7	13	19	−6	15	
8	Internacional-RS	18	4	5	9	14	19	−5	13	

Group B
Pos	Team	Pld	W	D	L	GF	GA	GD	Pts	Qualification
1	Vasco	18	8	8	2	26	16	+10	24	Qualified for the final
2	Cruzeiro	18	9	5	4	23	14	+9	23	
3	Palmeiras	18	8	6	4	21	13	+8	22	
4	Portuguesa	18	7	6	5	21	13	+8	20	
5	Goiás	18	6	6	6	17	21	−4	18	
6	Grêmio	18	6	5	7	19	19	0	17	
7	Santos	18	5	6	7	13	16	−3	16	
8	Fluminense	18	5	4	9	15	25	−10	14	

As Vasco da Gama had a better season record than São Paulo, the club earned a bonus point to the final and the right to choose where the first leg of the final would be played.

Final

December 16, 1989

São Paulo	0–1	Vasco da Gama

Morumbi

Vasco da Gama declared as the Campeonato Brasileiro champions after reaching 3 points.

=== Relegation ===
The three worst placed teams in the relegation stage, which are Atlético Paranaense, Guarani and Sport, were relegated to the following year's second level. Coritiba was also relegated, after being excluded from the competition in the first stage.

== Campeonato Brasileiro Série B ==
Quarterfinals

Team 1	Agg.	Team 2	1st leg	2nd leg
Ceará	1-2	Catuense	1-1	0-1
Itaperuna	1-2	Remo	0-0	1-2
São José	0-0	Juventude	0-0	0-0 (6-5 pen)
Criciúma	1-3	Bragantino	1-0	0-3

Semifinals

Team 1	Agg.	Team 2	1st leg	2nd leg
Remo	0-0	Bragantino	0-0	0-0 (1-4 pen)
Catuense	1-2	São José	0-1	1-1

Final

December 16, 1989

São José	0–1	Bragantino

Martins Pereira

December 20, 1989

Bragantino	2–1	São José

Marcelo Stéfani

Bragantino declared as the Campeonato Brasileiro Série B champions by aggregate score of 3–1.

=== Promotion ===
The champion and the runner-up, which are Bragantino and São José, were promoted to the following year's first level.

== Copa do Brasil ==
The Copa do Brasil final was played between Grêmio and Sport.

August 26, 1989

Sport	0–0	Grêmio

Ilha do Retiro

September 2, 1989

Grêmio	2–1	Sport

Olímpico

Grêmio declared as the cup champions by aggregate score of 1–0.

== State championship champions ==
State	Champion	State	Champion
Acre	Juventus-AC	Paraíba	Treze
Alagoas	Capelense	Paraná	Coritiba
Amapá	Independente	Pernambuco	Náutico
Amazonas	Rio Negro	Piauí	River
Bahia	Vitória	Rio de Janeiro	Botafogo
Ceará	Ceará	Rio Grande do Norte	América-RN
Distrito Federal	Taguatinga	Rio Grande do Sul	Grêmio
Espírito Santo	Desportiva	Rondônia	Ferroviário-RO
Goiás	Goiás	Roraima	Ríver-RR
Maranhão	Moto Club	Santa Catarina	Criciúma
Mato Grosso	Mixto	São Paulo	São Paulo
Mato Grosso do Sul	Operário	Sergipe	Sergipe
Minas Gerais	Atlético Mineiro	Tocantins	-
Pará	Remo		

== Youth competition champions ==
Competition	Champion
Copa Santiago de Futebol Juvenil	Nacional (Uruguay)
Copa São Paulo de Juniores	Fluminense
Taça Belo Horizonte de Juniores	Atlético Mineiro

== Other competition champions ==
Competition	Champion
Torneio de Integração da Amazônia	Trem

== Brazilian clubs in international competitions ==
Team	Copa Libertadores 1989	Supercopa Sudamericana 1989
Bahia	Quarterfinals	Did not qualify
Cruzeiro	Did not qualify	Quarterfinals
Flamengo	Did not qualify	Round of 16
Grêmio	Did not qualify	Semifinals
Internacional	Semifinals	Did not qualify
Santos	Did not qualify	Round of 16

== Brazil national team ==
The following table lists all the games played by the Brazil national football team in official competitions and friendly matches during 1989.

Date	Opposition	Result	Score	Brazil scorers	Competition
March 15, 1989	Ecuador	W	1–0	Washington	International Friendly
March 27, 1989	Rest of the World	L	1–2	Dunga	International Friendly (unofficial match)
March 29, 1989	(Saudi Arabia) Al-Ahli	W	3–1	Bebeto (2), Washington	International Friendly (unofficial match)
April 12, 1989	Paraguay	W	2–0	Cristóvão, Vivinho	International Friendly
May 10, 1989	Peru	W	4–1	Zé do Carmo, Bebeto, Charles Baiano (2)	International Friendly
May 24, 1989	Peru	D	1–1	Cristóvão	International Friendly
June 8, 1989	Portugal	W	4–0	Bebeto, Sobrinho (own goal), Ricardo Gomes, Charles Baiano	International Friendly
June 16, 1989	Sweden	L	1–2	Cristóvão	Tournament of Denmark
June 18, 1989	Denmark	L	0–4	-	Tournament of Denmark
June 21, 1989	Switzerland	L	0–1	-	International Friendly
June 22, 1989	(Italy) Milan	D	0–0	-	International Friendly (unofficial match)
July 1, 1989	Venezuela	W	3–1	Bebeto, Geovani, Baltazar	Copa América
July 3, 1989	Peru	D	0–0	-	Copa América
July 7, 1989	Colombia	D	0–0	-	Copa América
July 9, 1989	Paraguay	W	2–0	Bebeto (2)	Copa América
July 12, 1989	Argentina	W	2–0	Bebeto, Romário	Copa América
July 14, 1989	Paraguay	W	3–0	Bebeto (2), Romário	Copa América
July 16, 1989	Uruguay	W	1–0	Romário	Copa América
July 23, 1989	Japan	W	1–0	Bismarck	International Friendly
July 30, 1989	Venezuela	W	4–0	Branco, Romário, Bebeto (2)	World Cup Qualifying
August 13, 1989	Chile	D	1–1	Gonzalez (own goal)	World Cup Qualifying
August 20, 1989	Venezuela	W	6–0	Careca (4), Silas, Acosta (own goal)	World Cup Qualifying
September 3, 1989	Chile	W	2–0^{(1)}	Careca	World Cup Qualifying
October 14, 1989	Italy	W	1–0	André Cruz	International Friendly
November 14, 1989	Yugoslavia	D	0–0	-	International Friendly
December 20, 1989	Netherlands	W	1–0	Careca	International Friendly

^{(1)}Chile abandoned the match at 1–0. After an investigation, FIFA awarded Brazil a 2–0 win.

== Women's football ==
=== National team ===
The Brazil women's national football team did not play any matches in 1989.

=== Domestic competition champions ===
Competition	Champion
Taça Brasil	Radar
Troféu Brasil	Saad
