= Renatinho (footballer, born 1965) =

Brazilian footballer

Personal information
- Full name: Renato de Grandi Sampaio
- Date of birth: 9 June 1965 (age 61)
- Place of birth: São Paulo, Brazil
- Height: 1.73 m (5 ft 8 in)
- Position: Midfielder

Youth career
- –1985: São Paulo

Senior career*
Years	Team	Apps	(Gls)
1985–1990	São Paulo	87	(14)
1986	→ Londrina (loan)		
1990	Bahia		
1991–1992	São Bento		
1992	Coritiba		
- * Club domestic league appearances and goals as of 29 September 2023

Renato de Grandi Sampaio (born 9 June 1965), better known as Renatinho, is a Brazilian former professional footballer, who played as a midfielder.

== Career ==
Renato was promoted from São Paulo's youth sectors by coach Cilinho, and for the club he made 87 appearances and scored 14 goals. Also scored a historic goal against Corinthians, in the 1988 Campeonato Brasileiro.

== Personal life ==
Renato currently lives in the city of Fort Worth, Texas in the United States.

== Honours ==
São Paulo

- Campeonato Paulista: 1985, 1989
