= Wilson Mano =

Former Brazilian football player

Personal information
- Full name: Wilson Carlos Mano
- Date of birth: May 23, 1964 (age 62)
- Place of birth: Auriflama, Brazil
- Height: 1.81 m (5 ft 11 1/2 in)
- Position: Midfielder

Senior career*
Years	Team	Apps	(Gls)
1982–1985	XV de Jaú		
1986–1992	Corinthians	123	(11)
1993	Fujita Industries		
1994	Corinthians	14	(0)
1995	Sãocarlense		
1995	Bahia	6	(0)
1996	Fortaleza		
1996	XV de Jaú		

International career
1992	Brazil	1	(0)
- * Club domestic league appearances and goals

Wilson Mano (born May 23, 1964) is a former Brazilian football player.

== Biography ==
He started playing career at XV de Jaú. He moved to Corinthians in 1986. Corinthians won the 1990 Campeonato Brasileiro Série A.

On February 26, 1992, he debuted for the Brazil national team against United States.

From 1993, he played for several clubs including Japanese Fujita Industries, Corinthians and Fortaleza. He retired from playing career in 1996.
