= Copa Piauí =

- Organising body: Federação de Futebol do Piauí
- Founded: 2006
- Abolished: 2017
- Region: Piauí, Brazil
- Qualifier for: Campeonato Brasileiro Série C Campeonato Brasileiro Série D Copa do Brasil
- Related competitions: Campeonato Piauiense
- Most successful club(s): Flamengo (4 titles)

The Copa Piauí (English: Piuaí Cup) was a tournament organized by Federação de Futebol do Piauí in order to decide how club would be the representative of the state at the Campeonato Brasileiro Série C (2006–2007), Campeonato Brasileiro Série D (2008–2013) and Copa do Brasil (2015–2017).

== List of champions ==
Season	Champions	Runners-up
2006	Ríver (1)	Flamengo
2007	Barras (1)	Piauí
2008	Flamengo (1)	Picos
2009	Flamengo (2)	Picos
2010–2011	Not held	
2012	Flamengo (3)	Ríver
2013	Flamengo (4)	Piauí
2014	Not held	
2015	Parnahyba (1)	Flamengo
2016	Not held	
2017	4 de Julho (1)	Ríver
