= Esporte Clube Flamengo =

Association football club in Piauí, Brazil

Flamengo do Piauí
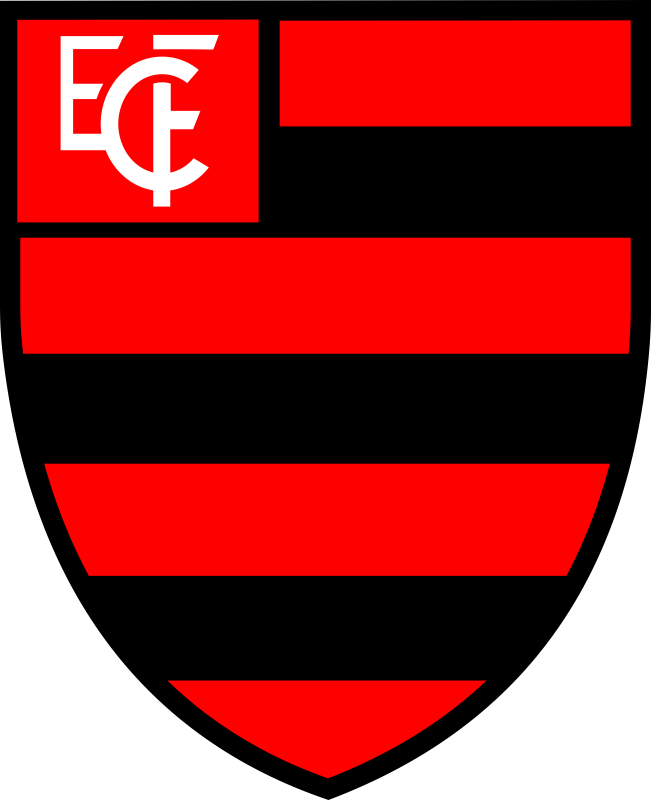
- Full name: Esporte Clube Flamengo
- Nickname: Mengão
- Founded: December 8, 1937
- Ground: Albertão, Teresina, Brazil
- Capacity: 60,000
- Chairman: Tiago Vasconcelos
- Manager: Vladimir de Jesus
- League: Campeonato Piauiense
Home colours	Away colours

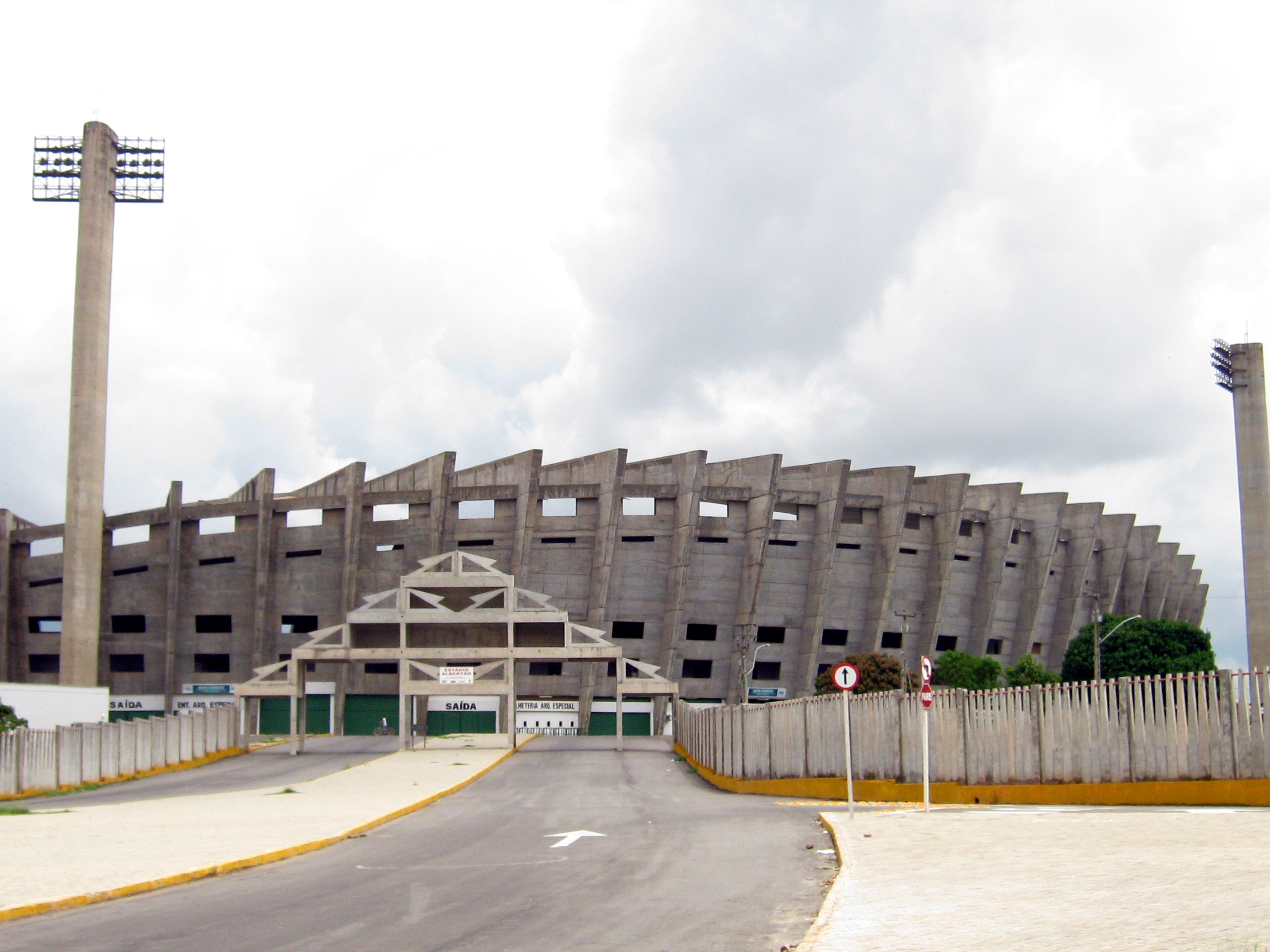
Estádio Governador Alberto Tavares Silva

Esporte Clube Flamengo, or usually called Flamengo do Piauí, are a Brazilian football team from Teresina in Piauí, Brazil founded on December 8, 1937. Their home stadium is the Albertão, which has a maximum capacity of 60,000 people. Their kit is black and red shirts, black shorts and red and black socks. Flamengo has competed in the Série A several times. EC Flamengo uses the same name and colors as their Rio de Janeiro counterpart, Clube de Regatas do Flamengo

== History ==
Esporte Clube Flamengo were founded on December 8, 1937. The club has won the Campeonato Piauiense 17 times, making them the second most successful club in that competition.

Flamengo has competed in the Taça Brasil twice. Their debut was in 1965 when they were eliminated in the first round of the Northern Group by Sampaio Corrêa. In 1966, they reached the semifinal of the Northern Group and they were beaten by Paysandu.

The club has also competed in the Série A several times. Flamengo's debut was in 1976, when they were eliminated in the first stage. Flamengo finished in last place of their group in 1977 and in 1978. Flamengo returned in 1980, being eliminated again in the first stage. Five years later, the club competed again, finishing in eighth position of their group. Flamengo competed in the 2000 Copa João Havelange, reaching the Green Module's second stage. Flamengo competed in the debut competition of the Copa do Brasil 1989, and they were eliminated in the first round by Guarani. The club competed in several additional editions of the cup.

== Honours ==
=== Official tournaments ===
State
Competitions	Titles	Seasons
Campeonato Piauiense	17	1939, 1942, 1944, 1945, 1946, 1964, 1965, 1970, 1971, 1976, 1979, 1984, 1986, 1987, 1988, 2003, 2009
Copa Piauí	4	2008, 2009, 2012, 2013

- record

=== Others tournaments ===
==== International ====
- Governor Dirceu Arcoverde International Tournament (1): 1978
- Brong William Cup (1): 2008

==== State ====
- Torneio Início do Piauí (10): 1961, 1965, 1967, 1968, 1970, 1973, 1979, 1985, 1991, 1999

=== Runners-up ===
- Campeonato Piauiense (14): 1941, 1946, 1962, 1966, 1968, 1972, 1975, 1977, 1985, 1993, 1994, 2002, 2012, 2015
- Copa Piauí (2): 2006, 2015
- Campeonato Piauiense Second Division (2): 2005, 2026

=== Women's Football ===
- Campeonato Piauiense de Futebol Feminino (1): 2011

== Stadium ==
Flamengo play their home games at Estádio Governador Alberto Tavares Silva, commonly known as Albertão, located in Teresina. The stadium has a maximum capacity of 60,000 people and was inaugurated on August 26, 1973.

== Rival ==
The rivalry between Flamengo and River is known as Rivengo. The derby's first ever game was played on April 25, 1948, and ended 0 – 0.
