= Zé do Carmo (footballer) =

Brazilian footballer (born 1961)

Personal information
- Full name: José do Carmo da Silva Filho
- Date of birth: 22 August 1961 (age 65)
- Place of birth: Recife, Brazil
- Height: 1.75 m (5 ft 9 in)
- Position: Midfielder

Youth career
- Santa Cruz

Senior career*
| Years | Team | Apps | (Gls) |
| 1979–1988 | Santa Cruz | | |
| 1988–1991 | Vasco da Gama | | |
| 1991–1994 | Académica | | |
| 1994–1997 | Santa Cruz | | |
| 1997 | CRB | | |
| 1998 | Ituano | | |
| 1998 | Uniclinic | | |

International career
| 1988–1989 | Brazil | 3 | (1) |

Managerial career
- 2008: Santa Cruz
- * Club domestic league appearances and goals

José do Carmo da Silva Filho (born 22 August 1961), better known as Zé do Carmo, is a Brazilian former professional footballer who played as a midfielder.

== Club career ==
Zé do Carmo began his career at Santa Cruz, the club where he became one of the main players in history. He was state champion three times with the club in 1983, 1986 and 1995. He also played for Vasco da Gama, where he was captain in winning the Brazilian title in 1989. In the end of the career, Zé do Carmos played in Portugal for Académica, and for CRB, Ituano and Uniclinic.

== International career ==
Zé do Carmo played in three official friendlies for the Brazil national team during 1988 and 1989, against Belgium, Ecuador and Peru, match in which Zé do Carmo scored one of the goals.

== Honours ==
Santa Cruz

- Campeonato Pernambucano: 1983, 1986, 1995

Vasco da Gama

- Campeonato Brasileiro: 1989
- Campeonato Carioca: 1988
- Taça Rio: 1988
- Taça Guanabara: 1990
- Ramón de Carranza Trophy: 1987, 1988
- Taça Adolpho Bloch: 1990
