= Cristóvão Borges =

Brazilian footballer (born 1959)

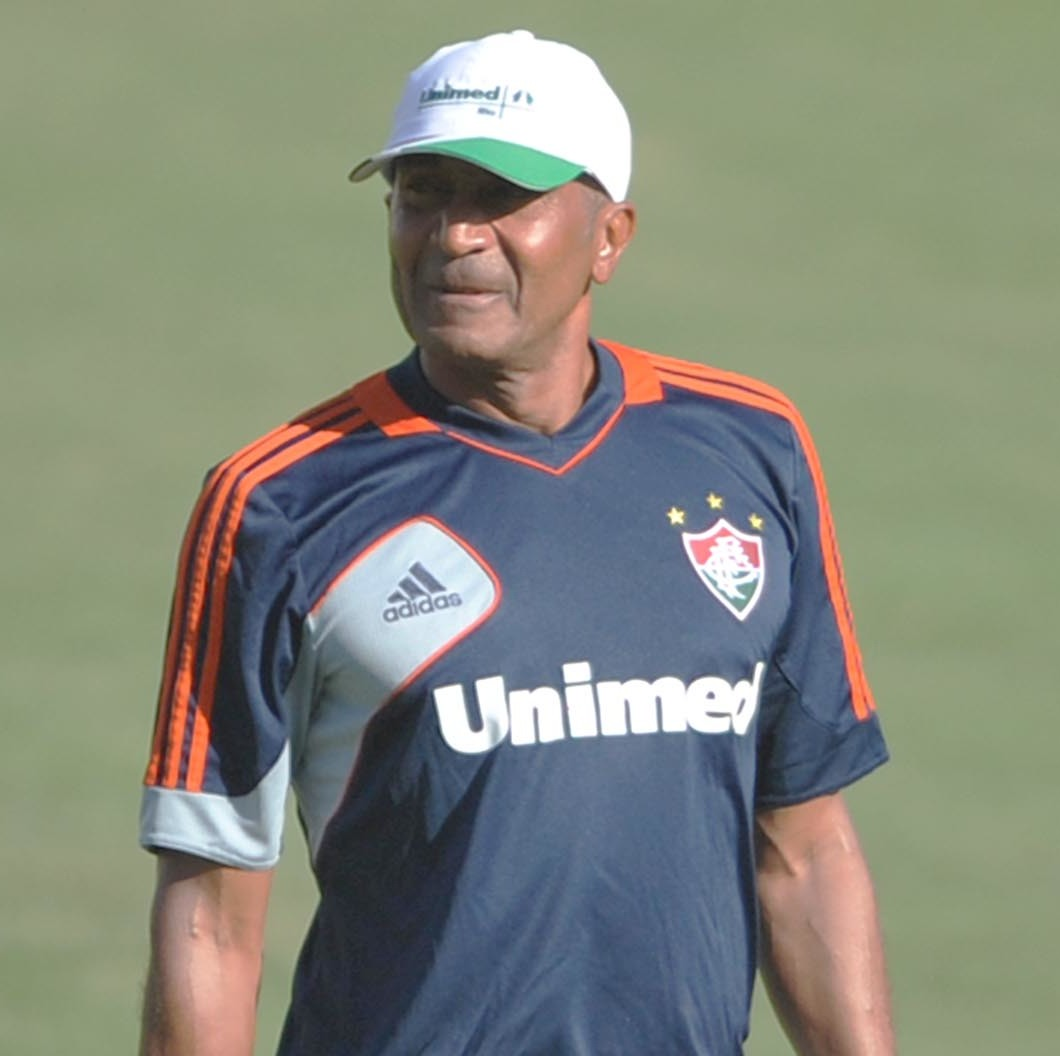

Personal information
- Full name: Cristóvão Borges dos Santos
- Date of birth: 9 June 1959 (age 67)
- Place of birth: Salvador, Bahia, Brazil
- Height: 1.79 m (5 ft 10 in)
- Position: Midfielder

Team information
- Current team: Tombense (head coach)

Youth career
- Bahia

Senior career*
| Years | Team | Apps | (Gls) |
| 1977–1978 | Bahia | | |
| 1979–1983 | Fluminense | | |
| 1983 | Operário-MS | | |
| 1983 | Atlético Paranaense | | |
| 1984 | Santa Cruz | | |
| 1985 | Atlético Paranaense | | |
| 1986–1987 | Corinthians | | |
| 1987–1989 | Grêmio | | |
| 1990 | Guarani | | |
| 1990–1992 | Portuguesa | | |
| 1993 | Atlético Mineiro | | |
| 1994 | Rio Branco-SP | | |

International career
| 1989 | Brazil | 7 | (3) |

Managerial career
- 1998: Bangu (assistant)
- 1999: Sport Recife (assistant)
- 1999–2000: Vitória (assistant)
- 2000: Guarani (assistant)
- 2001: Coritiba (assistant)
- 2002: Juventude (assistant)
- 2002–2004: Brazil U23 (assistant)
- 2004: Fluminense (assistant)
- 2004: Flamengo (assistant)
- 2008–2009: Al Shabab (assistant)
- 2011: Vasco da Gama (assistant)
- 2011–2012: Vasco da Gama
- 2013: Bahia
- 2014–2015: Fluminense
- 2015: Flamengo
- 2015–2016: Atlético Paranaense
- 2016: Corinthians
- 2017: Vasco da Gama
- 2020: Atlético Goianiense
- 2023: Figueirense
- 2026–: Tombense
Medal record
Representing Brazil
Men's Football
| Gold medal – first place | 1979 San Juan | Team competition |
- * Club domestic league appearances and goals

Cristóvão Borges dos Santos (born 9 June 1959) is a Brazilian professional football coach and former player who played as a midfielder. He is the current head coach of Tombense.

== Playing career ==
Born in Salvador, Cristóvão played for Fluminense, Atlético Paranaense, Corinthians, Grêmio among other clubs, Cristóvão began his career in Bahia. He won titles with Fluminense, Atlético-PR and Grêmio.

Cristóvão retired in 1994, after representing Rio Branco-SP. At international level, he represented Brazil on seven occasions during the 1989 season, scoring three goals and helping in their Copa América winning campaign.

== Coaching career ==
Cristóvão began working as an assistant coach four years after retiring, with his first experience being on Bangu in 1998. In the following year, he joined Ricardo Gomes' staff at Sport Recife, and subsequently worked with Gomes for nearly ten years. Both part ways in 2005, when Gomes was appointed head coach of FC Girondins de Bordeaux; Cristóvão later worked with Toninho Cerezo at Al Shabab.

In February 2011, Cristóvão rejoined Gomes' staff, being appointed assistant coach at Vasco da Gama. In August, as Gomes suffered a stroke and had to step aside from his activities, Cristóvão took over as head coach and guided Vasco to the Copa Sudamericana semifinals and the 2nd place on the 2011 Brazilian League. He was sacked on 10 September of the following year, after a 4–0 loss against Bahia.

On 17 May 2013, Cristóvão was appointed head coach of Bahia, still in the top tier. On 9 December, after avoiding relegation, he left the club on mutual agreement.

Cristóvão also managed other teams such as Fluminense, Flamengo and Atlético Paranaense. On 19 June 2016, he was announced as Corinthians' new head coach, after Tite left the club to manage the Brazil national team, but was relieved from his duties on 17 September, with less than three months in charge.

On 29 November 2016, Cristóvão returned to Vasco after being appointed head coach for the ensuing season. He was dismissed the following 17 March, and remained unemployed for nearly three years before taking over Atlético Goianiense on 20 January 2020.

Cristóvão was sacked by Atlético on 25 February 2020, after just seven matches. On 17 November 2022, after nearly two years without coaching, he was appointed in charge of Figueirense, but was sacked the following 19 March.

== Honours ==
=== Player ===
==== Club ====
Bahia

- Campeonato Baiano: 1977, 1978

Fluminense

- Campeonato Carioca: 1980

Atlético Paranaense

- Campeonato Paranaense: 1983, 1985

Grêmio

- Campeonato Gaúcho: 1987, 1988, 1989
- Copa do Brasil: 1989

==== International ====
Brazil

- Copa América: 1989
