= Zé Teodoro =

Brazilian football manager and former player

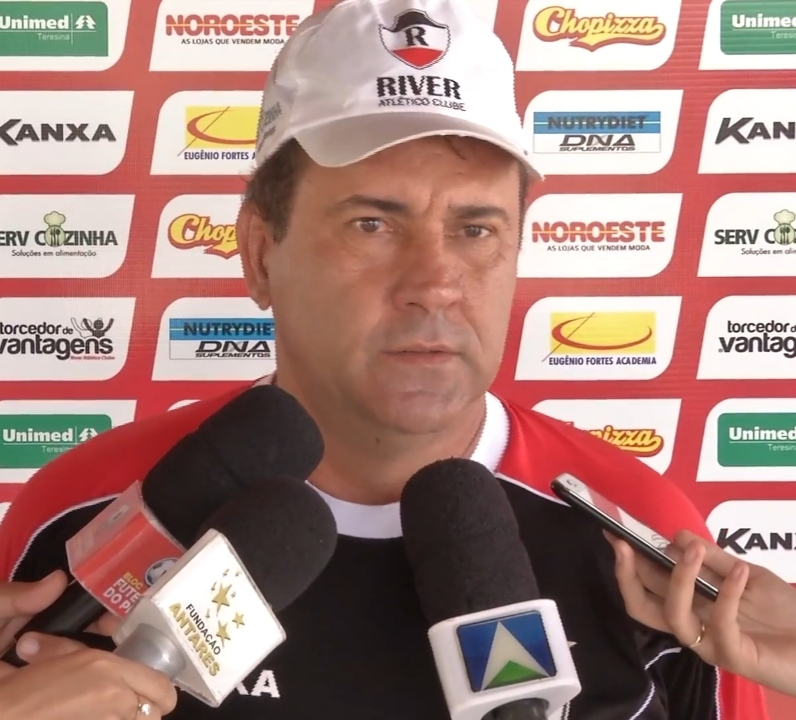
- Zé Teodoro in 2016

Personal information
- Full name: José Teodoro Bonfim Queiróz
- Date of birth: 22 November 1963 (age 62)
- Place of birth: Anápolis (GO - Brazil)
- Position: Defender

Team information
- Current team: Ferroviário (Manager)

Senior career*
Years	Team	Apps	(Gls)
1981	Anápolis		
1981–1985	Goiás		
1985–1991	São Paulo		
1992	Guarani		
1992–1993	Fluminense		
1993–1994	Bragantino		
1995	Goiás		
1996	Criciúma		

International career
1987	Brazil	2	(0)

Managerial career
- 1996: Jataiense
- 1997: Itumbiara
- 1998: Anápolis
- 1999: Goiânia
- 1999: Gama
- 1999–2000: Paraguaçuense
- 2000–2001: Rio Branco
- 2002: Juventude
- 2002: Paulista
- 2002: Santo André
- 2004–2005: Náutico
- 2005: Portuguesa
- 2005: Sport
- 2006: Ceará
- 2007: Rio Branco
- 2007: Avaí
- 2008: Atlético Goianiense
- 2009: Ceará
- 2009: Juventude
- 2010: Fortaleza
- 2011–2012: Santa Cruz
- 2013: Guarani
- 2013: Náutico
- 2014: Vila Nova
- 2014: ABC
- 2015: Remo
- 2016: Ríver
- 2016: Itumbiara
- 2017: Aparecidense
- 2018: Uberlândia
- 2019: Joinville
- 2020–: Ferroviário
- * Club domestic league appearances and goals

José Teodoro Bonfim Queiróz, known as Zé Teodoro (born 22 November 1963), is a Brazilian football manager. He made two appearances for the Brazil national team in 1987.

== Honors ==
=== Player ===
Goiás

- Campeonato Goiano: 1981, 1982, 1985

São Paulo

- Campeonato Paulista: 1985, 1987, 1989, 1991
- Campeonato Brasileiro Série A: 1986, 1991

=== Manager ===
Náutico

- Campeonato Pernambucano: 2004

Ceará

- Campeonato Cearense: 2006

Fortaleza

- Campeonato Cearense: 2010

Santa Cruz

- Campeonato Pernambucano: 2011, 2012
