= Mário Tilico =

Brazilian footballer

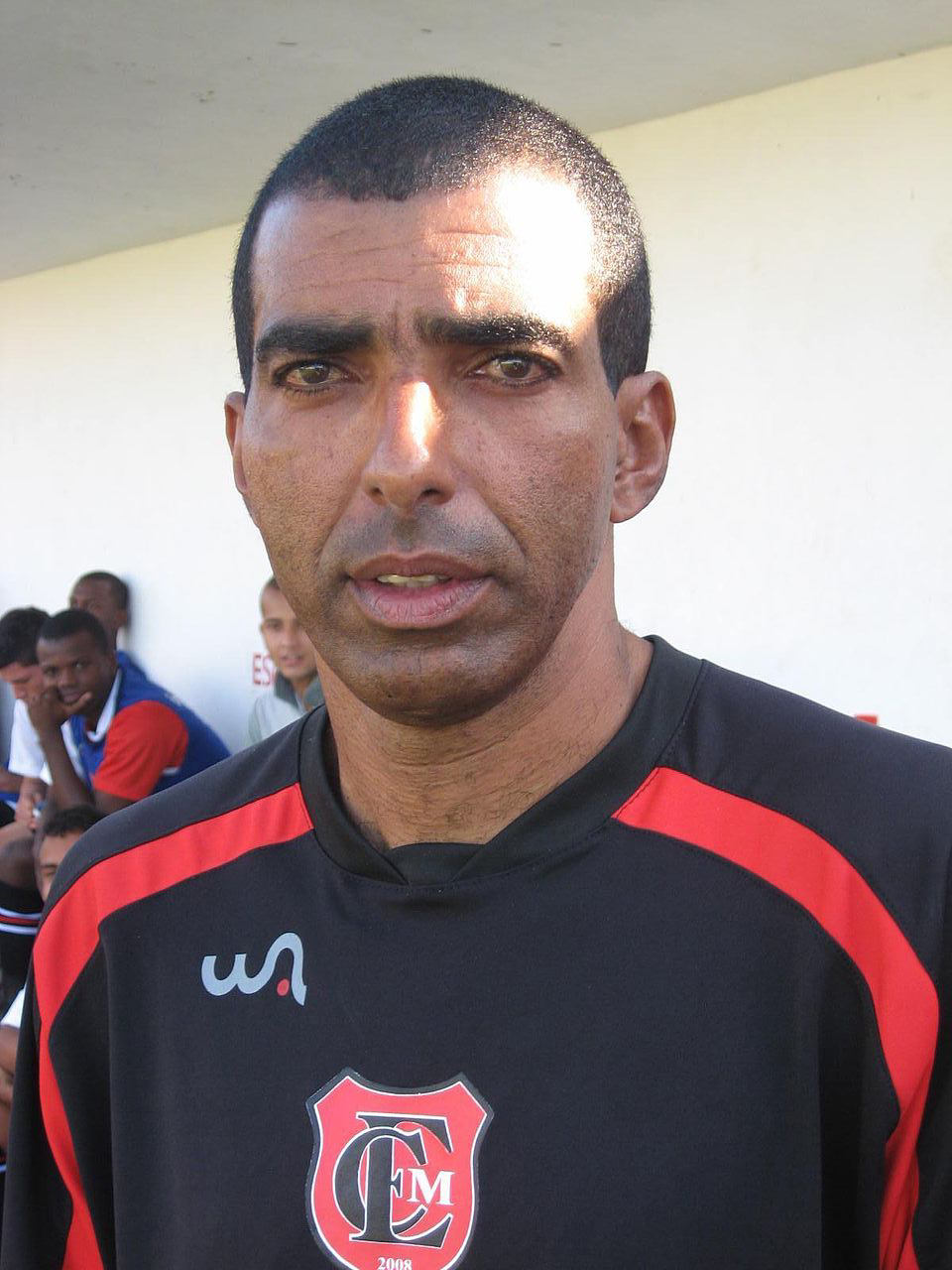

Personal information
- Full name: Mário de Oliveira Costa
- Date of birth: 23 March 1965 (age 61)
- Place of birth: Rio de Janeiro, Brazil
- Height: 1.75 m (5 ft 9 in)
- Position: Winger

Youth career
- –1985: Vasco da Gama

Senior career*
Years	Team	Apps	(Gls)
1985–1987	Vasco da Gama		
1986	→ CSA (loan)		
1987–1988	Náutico		
1988–1992	São Paulo	116	(23)
1991	→ Cruzeiro (loan)		
1992	→ Cádiz (loan)		
1992–1993	Atlético Marbella		
1993–1994	Atlético Madrid		
1994	→ Fluminense (loan)		
1994	Cruzeiro		
1995	Braga		
1995	León		
1996–1998	União Leiria		
1998	Al-Ittihad		
1998	Paraná		
1999–2000	Juventude		
2000	Americano		
2001–2002	Cabofriense		

Managerial career
- 2009: Ríver
- 2010: Marinho-RJ
- 2011: CSA
- 2013: Lajeadense (assistant)
- 2018–2019: Comercial-MS
- 2019: Costa Rica-MS
- 2020: Olímpia
- 2020: Comercial-MS
- 2021: Costa Rica-MS
- 2023: Ação
- 2025: Náutico-RR
- 2025: Coxim U20
- * Club domestic league appearances and goals

Mário de Oliveira Costa (born 23 March 1968), better known as Mário Tilico, is a Brazilian former professional footballer and manager who played as a winger.

== Playing career ==
Mário Tilico started in the youth levels of Vasco da Gama, the club for which his father played in the 60s. It was at São Paulo FC where he stood out the most important moment in his career, scoring the goal of the 1991 Brazilian Championship title. He was loaned to Cruzeiro in 1991, and won the Supercopa Libertadores title. In 1992, Tilico migrated to Spanish football where he played for Cádiz, Marbella and Atlético Madrid. In 1999, he helped win the most important title in the history of EC Juventude, the Copa do Brasil.

== Managerial career ==
Tilico began his career as a manager at Ríver AC, in the dispute of the Copa Piauí in 2009. In 2020, at Olímpia FC, he even attacked defender William in a fight, which ended up causing him to be sacked. Signed with Ação for the dispute of the 2023 Campeonato Mato-Grossense Second Division. In 2025 Tilico trained the Náutico-RR and Coxim U20 teams.

== Honours ==
Vasco da Gama

- Taça Guanabara: 1986, 1987
- Campeonato Carioca: 1987

São Paulo

- Campeonato Paulista: 1989
- Campeonato Brasileiro: 1991

Cruzeiro

- Supercopa Libertadores: 1991

Juventude

- Copa do Brasil: 1999
