= Ney Bala =

Brazilian footballer

Personal information
- Full name: Ney Gonçalves de Souza
- Date of birth: 6 May 1968 (age 58)
- Place of birth: Governador Valadares, Brazil
- Height: 1.76 m (5 ft 9 in)
- Position: Forward

Youth career
- Flamengo

Senior career*
Years	Team	Apps	(Gls)
1986	Flamengo		
1987	Vila Nova		
1987–1990	São Paulo	77	(12)
1990	Santos		
1991	Cerro Porteño		
1992–1994	Marília		
1995	Criciúma		
1996	Coritiba		
1996	Criciúma		
1997	Avaí		
1997	Chapecoense		
2000–2001	Nacional-AM		
2002	São Raimundo-AM		
2003	Democrata-GV		
- * Club domestic league appearances and goals as of 9 October 2023

Ney Gonçalves de Souza (born 6 May 1968), better known as Ney Bala, is a Brazilian former professional footballer who played as a forward.

== Career ==
Coming from Flamengo's youth teams, he was not used as a professional, being traded to Vila Nova. After standing out, he was hired by São Paulo where he won the 1989 Campeonato Paulista. He played for several other clubs, notably Cerro Porteño and teams from Santa Catarina.

== Honours ==
São Paulo

- Campeonato Paulista: 1989

Criciúma

- Campeonato Catarinense: 1995

Avaí

- Campeonato Catarinense: 1997
