= Paulo César (footballer, born 1971) =

Brazilian footballer

Personal information
- Full name: Paulo César de Melo da Silva
- Date of birth: 20 August 1971 (age 55)
- Place of birth: São Luís, Brazil
- Positions: Attacking midfielder; forward

Senior career*
Years	Team	Apps	(Gls)
1988–1990	São Paulo	74	(8)
1991	Flamengo	6	(1)
1992	Guarani		
1992–1994	Marília		
1995–1997	Botafogo-SP		
1997	União São João		
2004–2005	Moto Club		
2007	Moto Club		

Managerial career
- 2011: Moto Club
- 2016: Sampaio Corrêa U17
- * Club domestic league appearances and goals as of 2 October 2023

Paulo César de Melo da Silva (born 20 August 1971), simply known as Paulo César, is a Brazilian former professional footballer and manager, who played as an attacking midfielder and forward.

== Career ==
Paulo César emerged as a star at São Paulo FC, but never took off because he was not a disciplined athlete. He played for several clubs in the state of São Paulo until returning to Maranhão in 2004, where he was champion with the Moto Club.

In 2011, he was also the manager of Moto Club.

== Honours ==
São Paulo

- Campeonato Paulista: 1989

Moto Club

- Campeonato Maranhense: 2004
- Copa FMF: 2004
