= Edivaldo (footballer, born 1962) =

Brazilian footballer

Personal information
- Full name: Edivaldo Martíns da Fonseca
- Date of birth: April 13, 1962
- Place of birth: Volta Redonda, Brazil
- Date of death: January 13, 1993 (aged 30)
- Place of death: Boituva, Brazil
- Height: 1.73 m (5 ft 8 in)
- Position: Striker

Senior career*
Years	Team	Apps	(Gls)
1982	Atlético Mineiro	75	(26)
1983	Taquaritinga	32	(11)
1984–1987	Atlético Mineiro	22	(10)
1987–1990	São Paulo	53	(12)
1990	Puebla	12	(2)
1991–1992	Palmeiras	12	(0)
1992	Gamba Osaka		
1993	Taquaritinga		

International career^{‡}
1986–1989	Brazil	3	(0)
- * Club domestic league appearances and goals as of 15:41, December 30, 2007 (UTC) ‡ National team caps and goals as of 15:41, December 30, 2007 (UTC)

Edivaldo Martíns da Fonseca, best known as Edivaldo (born in Volta Redonda, Rio de Janeiro State, April 13, 1962 – died in Boituva, São Paulo State, January 13, 1993), was a Brazilian footballer who played as a forward.

In his career, which started in 1982, he played for Atlético Mineiro, Palmeiras, São Paulo, Taquaritinga (his last club), in Japan with Gamba Osaka, and in Mexico with Puebla. For the Brazil national team he played in three matches (April 1986 to July 1989) without scoring a goal, and was in the squad for the 1986 FIFA World Cup. He died in the Castelo Branco highway disaster in São Paulo, at 30 years of age.

== Club statistics ==
Club performance			League	
Season	Club	League	Apps	Goals
Brazil			League	
1984	Atlético Mineiro	Série A	9	10
1985	Atlético Mineiro	Série A	0	0
1986	Atlético Mineiro	Série A	13	0
1987	São Paulo	Série A	15	1
1988	São Paulo	Série A	23	7
1989	São Paulo	Série A	15	4
1990	São Paulo	Série A	0	0
Mexico			League	
1990/91	Puebla	Primera División	12	2
Brazil			League	
1991	Palmeiras	Série A	12	0
1992	Atlético Mineiro	Série A	8	0
Japan			League	
1992	Gamba Osaka	J1 League	-	
Country	Brazil		95	22
Country	Mexico		12	2
Country	Japan		0	0
Total			107	24

== International career statistics ==
Brazil national team
Year	Apps	Goals
1986	2	0
1987	0	0
1988	0	0
1989	1	0
Total	3	0
