= Bernardo (footballer, born 1965) =

Brazilian footballer

Personal information
- Full name: Bernardo Fernandes da Silva
- Date of birth: 20 April 1965 (age 61)
- Place of birth: São Paulo, Brazil
- Height: 1.87 m (6 ft 2 in)
- Position: Midfielder

Youth career
- Francana

Senior career*
| Years | Team | Apps | (Gls) |
| –1985 | Marília | | |
| 1986–1991 | São Paulo | 236 | (16) |
| 1991 | Bayern Munich | 4 | (0) |
| 1992 | Inter de Santa Maria | | |
| 1992 | Santos | 22 | (1) |
| 1992 | Club América | 33 | (4) |
| 1993—1994 | Vasco da Gama | 7 | (0) |
| 1995–1996 | Corinthians | 80 | (3) |
| 1995 | → Cerezo Osaka (loan) | 13 | (4) |
| 1997 | Atlético Paranaense | 5 | (0) |

International career
| 1989 | Brazil | 5 | (0) |
- * Club domestic league appearances and goals

Bernardo Fernandes da Silva or simply Bernardo (born 20 April 1965) is a retired Brazilian football player. He is now a player agent. His son Bernardo Fernandes da Silva Junior is also a footballer.

== Career statistics ==
=== Club ===
Appearances and goals by club, season and competition
| Club | Season | League | | | Cup (Note: Includes Emperor's Cup.) | | Total | |
| Club | Season | Division | Apps | Goals | Apps | Goals | Apps | Goals |
|---|---|---|---|---|---|---|---|---|
| Cerezo Osaka | 1995 | J1 League | 13 | 4 | 2 | 0 | 15 | 4 |
| Career total | | | 13 | 4 | 2 | 0 | 15 | 4 |

=== International ===
Appearances and goals by national team and year
| National team | Year | Apps | Goals |
|---|---|---|---|
| Brazil | 1989 | 5 | 0 |
| Total | | 5 | 0 |
