= Cilinho =

Brazilian footballer (1939–2019)

Personal information
- Full name: Otacílio Pires de Camargo
- Date of birth: February 9, 1939
- Place of birth: Campinas (SP), Brazil
- Date of death: November 28, 2019 (aged 80)
- Place of death: Campinas (SP), Brazil

Managerial career
- Years: Team
- 1966: Ferroviária
- 1969–1970: Ponte Preta
- 1970: Mazembe
- 1973: Portuguesa
- 1973–1974: Sport
- 1974: Ponte Preta
- 1974: XV de Jaú
- 1975: Paulista
- 1976: Comercial-SP
- 1982: Santos
- 1984–1985: São Paulo
- 1987: Ponte Preta
- 1987–1989: São Paulo
- 1989: Guarani
- 1991: Corinthians
- 1994: Bragantino
- 1999: América-SP
- 2003: São Paulo B
- 2011–2012: Rio Branco

Otacílio Pires de Camargo, commonly known as Cilinho (February 9, 1939 – November 28, 2019) was a Brazilian football coach, responsible for the discovery of many talents. He was born in Campinas.

== Career ==
It was he who directed the Sao Paulo team which in the 1980s was named "Menudos do Morumbi", after the popular 1980s Puerto Rican teen pop boy band Menudo, due to the young age of the group.

He won the Campeonato Paulista with São Paulo in 1985 and in 1987, the Campeonato Paulista Second Division with Ponte Preta in 1969, and the Campeonato Paulista Série A2 in 1999 with América-SP. Cilinho has also managed clubs such as Portuguesa, Sport, XV de Jaú, Guarani and Bragantino.
