= 1989 Campeonato Paulista =

Campeonato Paulista – Série A1
- Season: 1989
- Champions: São Paulo
- Copa do Brasil: São Paulo; São José
- Matches played: 260
- Goals scored: 503 (1.93 per match)
- Top goalscorer: Toni (São José); Toninho (Portuguesa) – 13 goals
- Biggest home win: Portuguesa 6–0 Botafogo (February 26, 1989); Guarani 7-1 Santo André (May 3, 1989)
- Biggest away win: Noroeste 0-4 São José (March 52, 1989); Ferroviária 0–4 Palmeiras (March 26, 1989); Juventus 0-4 São Paulo (April 19, 1989)
- Highest scoring: Guarani 7-1 Santo André (May 3, 1989)

The 1989 Campeonato Paulista da Primeira Divisão de Futebol Profissional was the 88th season of São Paulo's top professional football league. São Paulo won the championship for the 16th time. No teams were relegated.

== Championship ==
The twenty-two teams of the championship were divided into two groups of eleven teams, with each team playing once against the teams of its own group and the other group. The three best teams of each group, plus the six overall best teams aside of them would qualify to the Third phase. The group phase also had peculiar rules regarding points: wins with three or more goals scored were worth an extra point, and goalless ties had to be followed by a penalty shootout, worth one point for the winner and none for the loser.

The Second phase's twelve teams were divided into four groups of three, with each team playing twice against the teams of its own group, with the best team of each group qualifying to the Semifinals, with their winners qualifying to the finals.

=== First phase ===
==== Group 1 ====
Pos	Team	Pld	W	PW	D	PL	L	GF	GA	GD	Pts	Qualification or relegation
1	Mogi Mirim	21	9	0	4	1	7	20	26	−6	22	Qualified
2	Inter de Limeira	21	6	3	6	1	5	17	15	+2	22	Qualified
3	União São João	21	6	2	5	4	4	20	18	+2	20	Qualified
4	Novorizontino	21	6	4	3	1	7	17	21	−4	19	Qualified
5	XV de Piracicaba	21	6	3	4	2	6	18	20	−2	19	
6	Noroeste	21	6	0	2	1	12	20	33	−13	17	
7	América	21	5	2	3	2	9	19	26	−7	17	
8	Catanduvense	21	7	1	0	3	10	19	19	0	16	
9	Ferroviária	21	5	0	3	1	12	16	33	−17	13	
10	Botafogo	21	2	2	7	2	8	14	27	−13	13	
11	XV de Jaú	21	4	2	0	3	12	15	23	−8	11	

Updated to match(es) played on May 28, 1989. Source: RSSSF.com
Rules for classification: 1) points; 2) head-to-head points; 3) wins; 4) goal difference; 5) number of goals scored.

==== Group 2 ====
Pos	Team	Pld	W	PW	D	PL	L	GF	GA	GD	Pts	Qualification or relegation
1	Palmeiras	21	13	2	4	2	0	34	6	+28	36	Qualified
2	São José	21	12	2	3	0	4	31	16	+15	33	Qualified
3	Guarani	21	9	1	5	3	3	34	15	+19	29	Qualified
4	Portuguesa	21	9	0	7	2	3	32	15	+17	29	Qualified
5	São Paulo	21	9	2	3	3	4	27	12	+15	29	Qualified
6	Corinthians	21	10	2	3	0	6	27	17	+10	28	Qualified
7	Bragantino	21	10	1	4	0	6	18	15	+3	25	Qualified
8	Santos	21	6	5	4	3	3	17	12	+5	22	Qualified
9	Santo André	21	6	2	3	3	7	14	24	−10	17	
10	Juventus	21	3	2	4	0	12	16	31	−15	13	
11	São Bento	21	3	1	3	2	12	9	27	−18	10	

Updated to match(es) played on May 28, 1989. Source: RSSSF.com
Rules for classification: 1) points; 2) head-to-head points; 3) wins; 4) goal difference; 5) number of goals scored.

=== Second phase ===
==== Group 1 ====
Pos	Team	Pld	W	D	L	GF	GA	GD	Pts	Qualification or relegation
1	Corinthians	4	3	1	0	7	2	+5	7	Qualified
2	Santos	4	1	2	1	3	4	−1	4	
3	Mogi Mirim	4	0	1	3	2	6	−4	1	

Updated to match(es) played on June 18, 1989. Source: RSSSF.com
Rules for classification: 1) points; 2) wins; 3) goal difference; 4) Best season record

==== Group 2 ====
Pos	Team	Pld	W	D	L	GF	GA	GD	Pts	Qualification or relegation
1	Bragantino	4	3	0	1	5	2	+3	6	Qualified
2	Palmeiras	4	1	2	1	2	3	−1	4	
3	Novorizontino	4	0	2	2	0	2	−2	2	

Updated to match(es) played on June 18, 1989. Source: RSSSF.com
Rules for classification: 1) points; 2) wins; 3) goal difference; 4) Best season record

==== Group 3 ====
Pos	Team	Pld	W	D	L	GF	GA	GD	Pts	Qualification or relegation
1	São José	4	2	1	1	5	3	+2	5	Qualified
2	Portuguesa	4	2	1	1	6	4	+2	5	
3	União São João	4	1	0	3	4	8	−4	2	

Updated to match(es) played on June 18, 1989. Source: RSSSF.com
Rules for classification: 1) points; 2) wins; 3) goal difference; 4) Best season record

==== Group 4 ====
Pos	Team	Pld	W	D	L	GF	GA	GD	Pts	Qualification or relegation
1	São Paulo	4	2	2	0	6	4	+2	6	Qualified
2	Guarani	4	1	1	2	6	6	0	3	
3	Inter de Limeira	4	1	1	2	3	5	−2	3	

Updated to match(es) played on June 18, 1989. Source: RSSSF.com
Rules for classification: 1) points; 2) wins; 3) goal difference; 4) Best season record

=== Semifinals ===
Team 1	Agg.	Team 2	1st leg	2nd leg
Bragantino	0–3	São Paulo	0–2	0–1
Corinthians	2–2	São José	2–0	0–2

=== Finals ===
Team 1	Agg.	Team 2	1st leg	2nd leg
São Paulo	1–0	São José	1–0	0–0
