= Campeonato Brasileiro tournament scheduling =

Between 1959 and 1970, two national championships existed to provide Brazilian representatives to Copa Libertadores. These were the Taça Brasil (1959–1968) and the Torneio Roberto Gomes Pedrosa (1967–1970). The current Campeonato Brasileiro Série A (i.e., Brazilian football league) was created in 1971 using the structure of Torneio Roberto Gomes Pedrosa. Since then, the competition has never featured the same scheduling twice, either changing the number of participants or the structure. This lack of consistency has made the competition difficult for non-Brazilians to follow and contributed to the ignorance of the tournament amongst European and American press and public, on top of the standard disregard and prejudices.

Even today, despite the tournament maintaining a consistent structure for 8 years, it is harder to find score updates on major European newspapers such as the International Herald Tribune or L'Équipe than it is for the Argentinian championships. And of course this has contributed to lack of major reference about the clubs themselves, as on top of these variations the Brazilian championship is among the most balanced in the world with its Clube dos 13, the greatest football clubs of Brazil, and other competitive clubs and as rivalries are often based in details. To better understand Brazilian football, a brief history of the Brazilian soccer national-league tournament-scheduling history is explained below on a yearly basis, with emphasis on technical aspects. Tables with final placings and a straightforward ranking based on simple rules are also provided as CBF rules for official placings have so far reflected the troubled tournament's history and as no official ranking from CBF is publicly available, let alone in detail.

== Brief history ==
=== 1971–1980 ===
1971 Campeonato Nacional de Clubes – Single division w/ 20 participants

1st Phase: 2 groups of 10 teams.

Obs.: this phase illustrate a common Brazilian tournament scheduling, still popular nowadays as proved by 2006 Rio state league (Campeonato Carioca), dubbed here "split round-robin". In this scheduling, a pool of teams are split in two (or more) groups but play against all others as in a full single round-robin system. In general they will play in two stages against their own group opponents in a row (called here "internal stage") then with the other group's opponents ("external" stage). Many variants are then possible as to how the final phase is organized upon. Often each stage will have its champion and runner-up, and play-offs are organized accordingly. This system has been often used to accommodate calendar constraints as double round-robin systems would require too many rounds. The home and away matches are distributed randomly.

In 1971, the split round-robin only served to qualify the top 6 teams of each group. This odd system allowed for a team to be eliminated by having a better full season record by falling in a stronger group. In this edition though, it did not occur, and the best overall 12 teams advanced.

2nd phase: 3 groups of 4 teams. Double round-robin system. Top teams of each group qualify

Final phase: "Triangular", i.e. 1 group of 3 teams . Single round-robin. Random home and away matches.

1972 Campeonato Nacional de Clubes – Single division w/ 26 participants

1st phase: 4 groups, 2 of 6 teams and 2 of 7 teams, split round-robin similar to 1971 but with 4 groups instead of 2. The 4 top teams of each group qualified. As expectable already in 1971, it did occur this time that Santa Cruz qualified with 23 points in group C while Remo in group C did not make through with 25 points, despite playing exactly the same opponents.

2nd phase: 4 groups of 4 teams (top 2 against bottom 2 of previous phase), single round-robin with home and away matches based on first phase placing (though still top teams would play bottom teams away in second round). Top team only qualified.

Final phase: Single play-off semifinals and final. Home advantage according to combined first and second phase placings.

1973 Campeonato Nacional de Clubes – Single division w/ 40 participants

1st phase: two stages, 1st) 2 groups of 20 teams in single round-robin, teams distributed in each group randomly; and 2nd) 4 groups of 10 teams in single round-robin distributed according to region/state. Combined first and second stage top 20 teams qualified. Arguably this system favored teams from weaker regions (mainly north-east) as they would be able to play between themselves. As such, Fluminense was eliminated while Tiradentes proceeded despite placing behind Fluminense in the same group of first stage.

2nd phase: 2 groups of 10, single round-robin with random home and away matches. Top 2 teams qualified.

Final phase: "Quadrangular", i.e. 1 group of 4 in single round robin. Home and away matches order based on combined first and second phases.

1974 Campeonato Nacional de Clubes – Single division w/ 40 participants.

1st phase: 2 groups of 20. Single round-robin with random home and away matches. Top 10 of each group qualified, plus remaining top 2 overall (to compensate possible group strength imbalance), plus... remaining top 2 public attendance. Thus Fluminense and Nacional advanced despite 32nd and 34th placings. This odd feature would never be reapplied.

2nd phase: 4 groups of 6 teams. Single round-robin with random away and home matches. Top team only of each group would qualify.

Final phase: "Quadrangular". Single round-robin. Home and away matches criteria unclear.

1975 Copa Brasil – Single division w/ 46 participants

The 1975 tournament introduced the feature of repechage, which eventually would be largely practiced in the following decades in "creative" ways, and eventually allowing ground for disputes that disrupted the championship as in the late 80's.

1st phase: 4 groups, with 2 paired groups of 10 teams and 2 paired of 11 teams. The system was what could be called "complementary round-robin" as teams of one group only played against the teams of the other group paired to it, with no internal round-robin. Top 5 teams of each group qualified for main groups while remaining teams qualified for repechage groups. Group distributions were random. An odd scheduling sometimes reproduced later on for unknown reasons, except urge for randomness.

2nd phase: 2 main groups of 10 teams and 4 repechage groups (2 of 5 and 2 of 6 teams). Main groups would reuse "complementary round-robin" system. Repechage groups single round-robin. Both random home and away matches. Top 6 teams of main groups and top team of repechage groups would qualify.

3rd phase: 2 groups of 8 teams. This time, standard single round-robin system (probably because of play-off needs). Top 2 would qualify.

Final phase: single play-off semi-finals and final. Home advantage on 3rd phase group placing (crossed winner vs runner-up).

Ranking issues: Final placings for top 16 teams based only on third phase placings, irrespective of first and second phase, given the inconsistency of those phases and differences between main and repechage groups. Also the third phase was large enough to provide a significant placing. Thus Flamengo and América-RJ are given both 5th place, for instance, instead of 7th and 8th according to CBF. Teams re-qualified from repechage are thus placed ahead of eliminated main group teams. Placing of eliminated main and repechage group teams consider 1st phase results as there was no elimination in the latter.

1976 Copa Brasil – Single division w/ 54 participants (similar to 1975)

First phase: 6 groups of 9 teams. Single round robin. Random home and away matches. Top 4 of each group would qualify to main groups of second phase, remaining would go to repechage groups.

Second phase: 4 main groups of 6 teams and 6 repechage groups of 5 teams. Single round robin. Random home and away matches. Top 3 of main groups and top team of repechage groups qualified.

Third phase: 2 groups of 9 teams. Single round-robin. Random home and away matches. Top two of each group qualified.

Final phase: single play-off semi-finals and final. Home advantage to 3rd phase group winners.

Ranking issues: same as for 1975.

1977 Copa Brasil – Single division w/ 60 participants

1st phase: 6 groups of 10. Single round robin. Top 5 qualify. Remaining to repechage.

2nd phase: 6 main groups for 5 teams and 6 repechage groups of 5 teams. Single round-robin. Top 3 of main groups and top team of repechage groups qualified.

3rd phase: 4 group of 6 teams. Single round robin. Top team qualify

Final phase: single play-off semi-finals and final. Home advantage on combined phase results.

1978 Copa Brasil – Single division w/ 74 participants.

1st phase: 2 groups of 13 teams and 6 of 12 teams. Single round-robin. Top 6 qualify. Remaining to repechage

2nd phase: 4 main groups of 9 teams. Round-robin. Top 6 qualify plus 1 on combined 1st and 2nd phase results. 6 repechage groups, 2 of 7 teams and 4 of 6 teams. Round-robin. Top teams qualified plus 1 on combined 1st and 2nd phase results.

3rd phase: 4 groups of 8 teams. Round-robin. Top 2 qualify

Final phase: home and away quarterfinals, semifinals and final play-offs. Home and qualifying (two draws) advantage on better season record.

1979 Copa Brasil – Single division w/ 96 participants

The 1979 tournament was by no means a banal one: changing from the previous repechage system, the organizers scheduled phases with teams from Rio and São Paulo state league state as byes, directly entering the competition in the second phase. On top, the champion and runner-up of 1978 tournament only entered the last (third) phase, thus totalling only the odd figure of 3 matches for their whole participation if they did not reach the final phase(what did occur with Guarani play-offs. And Palmeiras ranked 3rd after playing only 5 matches. Because of this and as Guarani and Palmeiras were both from São Paulo state, major rival teams from this state (Corinthians, São Paulo, Santos and Portuguesa), byes to second phase, required jealously also to enter directly third phase, thus abandoning the tournament as their request was refused. The tournament displayed a record number of participants (perhaps worldwide for a single high-level football tournament). The competition schedulers managed though to break this record in the 2000 tournament with more than 100 entrants.

1st phase: 80 teams (16 teams as byes initially). 8 groups of 10 teams, distributed by region, out of which 2 groups (G and H) from stronger Minas and Rio Grande leagues. Round robin. Top 4 qualified from the 6 weaker league groups and top 8 qualified from the stronger league groups, totalling 40 qualified. As 4 teams withdrew from the tournament on second phase, they were replaced by remaining top 4 teams on overall results among the 8 groups.

2nd phase: 56 teams (12 teams entering directly second phase, 6 from Rio and São Paulo state each, 2 teams as byes). 7 groups of 8 teams. Round robin. Top 2 qualified.

3rd phase: 16 teams (2 last byes entering this phase). 4 groups of 4 teams. Round robin. Top team qualified.

Final phase: Double semi-final and final play-offs with home advantage on better season record (though difficult to establish n the case of third-phase byes).

Ranking issues: this barely atypical tournament raises the issues of the placings of the bye teams, especially the two entering third phase. Placings for top 16 teams only take into account the third phase and placing of the remaining 40 teams only consider second phase, thus making the first phase irrelevant to final placings. Also noteworthy though ultimately irrelevant for the ranking, the eliminated teams from group G and H from the first phase were considered better placed than those from the remaining 6 groups, as groups G and H manifestly were considered a higher tier (8 qualified out of 10 instead of 4 out of 10 for the lower tier groups).

1980 Copa Brasil – Two divisions w/ 40 and 64 participants

The 1980 tournament, after the 1979 confusion, introduced the concept of separate divisions (i.e. not totally independent). The two-tier championship would allow second division teams to enter first-division second phase in its middle, in the form of an "internal promotion". As such the overall number of participants was theoretically even superior to 1979, as any of the 104 teams of both divisions could clinch the title.

First division: 40 teams

First phase: 4 groups of 10. Round-robin. Top 7 qualify.

Second phase: 32 teams ( with 4 teams promoted from second division's second phase). 8 groups of 4 teams. Double round-robin. Top 2 qualified

Third phase: 4 groups of 4 teams. Single round-robin. Top team qualified.

Final phase: Double semi-finals and final play-offs.

Second division: 64 teams

First division: 8 groups of 8. Top team qualified for second phase, remaining 2 qualified directly to third phase.

Second phase: 8 teams in double play-offs to determine the 4 teams promoted to first division's second phase. Defeated teams would rejoin third phase.

Third phase: 4 groups of 5. Round robin. Top team qualified

Final phase: double semi-finals and final play-offs.

Ranking issues: given the limit of 48 points for the yearly ranking, are considered here the 40 teams of first division, the 4 promoted teams and second division's final 4 top teams. Promoted teams are ranked higher than first division teams eliminated from first phase. Given this, the top 32 placings do not take into account first phase results from both divisions, contrarily to CBF.

=== 1981–1990 ===
1981 Taça de Ouro

The 1981 tournament reapplied the concepts of 1980 with two internal divisions, with for the first time promotion from second division (Londrina and CSA). Despite these teams being the second division finalists, they arguably were not the top second division teams as none had participated the second phase play-offs. The 4 teams promoted during the 1980 second phase nominally with better placing than these two finalists were not re-promoted (as they could not play the second division finals while the 4 other teams they had beaten had rejoined the third phase but still none did make into the finals also). Two of these 4 teams didn't participate at all as they did not qualify from their state league performance (América-SP and Americano-RJ).

First division: 40 teams

1st phase: 4 groups of 10, round-robin, top 7 qualify.

2nd phase: 4 groups of 8 (4 teams promoted from second division's second phase), round robin, top 2 qualify

Final phase: 16-team double play-offs with home and draw advantage on better season record.

Second division: 48 teams

1st phase: 6 groups of 8 teams, round robin, top 2 qualified.

2nd phase: 4 groups of 3 teams, single round-robin, top team qualified to first-division second phase, runners-up qualified to final phase.

Final phase: 4-team double play-offs, home advantage based on season record.

1982 Taça de Ouro

The 1982 edition, while maintaining the previous system of two-tier divisions, exceeded in creativity by introducing for the first time the feature of internal relegation. As for the internal promotion, teams from first-division first phase would be relegated entering second-division's third phase, only to be able to still fight for a place in the second-division finals and thus guarantee promotion to following-year's first division. It was probably the first and unique example of "cross internal promotion and relegation" where teams starting on first division could end up second-division champions and teams of second division could end up first-division champions within the same season.

As in 1981, promotion from previous-year second division was odd, as finalists were promoted though failing to qualify among the top 4 teams on the second phase. On the contrary, none of the latter were re-promoted despite their better record. The case hit particularly Palmeiras and Uberaba, which failed to qualify through state league performance. Ironically enough, Palmeiras had directly eliminated champions Guarani on 1981's second phase, thus reaching internal promotion but being unable to dispute the second division title which Guarani eventually clinched.

The Palmeiras case was particularly ironic (or rather dramatic) as, because of this, Palmeiras had to play for second year in a row in second division and moreover failed to clinch this time internal promotion, being eliminated straight in first phase. This was the only case in the tournament's history where a top-12 traditional team failed to place among the top 48 teams (actually 65th placing), thus collecting 0 points in ranking. The closest case would be Fluminense in 1999 and 2000 which was relegated to third division and then champion of it, thus placing 43rd and 45th back to back.

First division: 40 teams

1st phase: 8 groups of 5 teams, double round-robin. Top 3 qualified to second phase, 4th qualified for 8-team relegation play-offs and bottom (5th) team was directly relegated to second-division third phase. Relegation play-offs would send 4 teams to relegation and remaining would proceed normally to second phase.

2nd phase: 8 groups of 4, including 4 promoted from second-division first phase. Double round-robin. Top 2 qualified

Final phase: 16-team playoffs with home and draw advantage to better season record.

Second division: 48 teams

1st phase: 6 groups of 8 teams. Round robin. Top 2 qualified

2nd phase: 4 groups of 3 teams. Single round robin. Top team promoted to first-division second phase. Runners-up proceeded to final phase

Final phase: 16-team (including 12 teams relegated from first-division first phase) play-offs with home and draw advantage according to season record.

1983 Taça de Ouro

The 1983 edition repeated the previous-year cross internal promotion and relegation. The format was almost identical except that a round-robin third phase was added in the first division, instead of 1/8 finals play-offs. Also another innovation was the introduction of reserved spots for teams failing to qualify from state league performance, based on historical ranking. This was the direct result of Palmeiras humiliation from previous year. Santos was the first benefited from it. Apparently there were no criteria for how many teams applied for it, but the known effect was to secure traditional teams qualifying (basically the top 12 league). Santos though managed to make it through the finals, only finish runner-up to Flamengo.

First division: 40 teams

1st phase: 8 groups of 5 (see 1982).

2nd phse: 4 groups of 8 (see 1982)

3rd phase: 4 groups of 4, round robin, top 2 qualified

Final phase: 8-team play-offs

Second division: 48 teams (see 1982)

1984 Copa Brasil

In 1984, the internal relegation system was abandoned. Also the issues regarding promotion (internal and year-to-year) led to a quicker, 32-team second-division play-off system that would allow the champion to join first-division third phase, thus allowing theoretically it to clinch also the first-division title back-to-back in the same year. Oddly enough, second-division runners-up were not awarded internal promotion to the last third-phase berth.

Again the principle of qualifying through historical ranking qualifying for traditional teams with poor state league performance applied, with the added issue that this time two prestigious clubs (Vasco and Grêmio) failed to qualify. Confirming the unwritten rule of securing presence of top-12 teams in first-division, both teams were awarded a berth in first division. As in 1983, the decision proved to be somehow justified, as Vasco eventually reached the final only to lose it to Fluminense, just as Santos did in 1983 against Flamengo.

Probably sacrificed in this big-dog game was Juventus, a small team from São Paulo state, which was the 1983 second-division champion and was unexplainably not promoted this time, probably because of Grêmio qualification issue. It is also ironic that Juventus was the only example of a team starting a tournament in first division, relegated to second division during the competition, clinching eventually the second-division title, yet not being promoted to the first division of next year and finally not qualifying to it as it failed also to secure qualification through state league. it was thus not surprising that the internal relegation system was quickly abandoned.

First division: 40 teams

1st phase: 8 groups of 5, round-robin, similar to 82–83. Top 3 qualify. 4th place qualify to 8-team play-off. Play-off winner also joined 2nd phase and no team was relegated.

2nd phase: 8 groups of 4 (see 1982–1983). One extra team was qualified to complete remaining 3rd phase berth from the best 3rd-placed teams among all groups (a rather fortuitous criterion, instead of for instance qualifying second-division runners-up)

3rd phase: 4 groups of 4 (see 1982–1983). Champions of second-division play-offs entered this phase.

Final phase: 8-team double play-offs.

1985 Copa Brasil

This time the tournament changed its structure compared to the previous 4 years. As a result of previous difficulties from traditional teams to qualify from their state league, probably due to increased competitivity of smaller provincial clubs, the tournament secured 20 berths according to historical ranking. The remaining qualified from state leagues. 1984 second division finalists also qualified, thus further stressing the injustice on Juventus (and CSA) in 1983.

This principle of a hard core, though already existing in practice, probably influenced for ever the power balance as the traditional teams eventually started challenging CBF's organization.

First division: 44 teams.

1st phase: 4 groups. 2 paired groups of 10 teams featuring the traditional clubs qualified by historical ranking, and 2 paired groups of 12 teams with the remaining teams. The 2 groups pairs were treated equally as for qualifying criteria despite the weight of the first pair. Each team would only play the clubs of its paired group in home and away stages, thus not featuring real round-robin system. The champions of each stage would qualify as well the top 2 teams on overall performance over both stages. As such no teams played in this phase the teams of their own group.

2nd phase: 4 groups of 4 teams, double round-robin. As noted, the result of 8 teams qualifying from less traditional pool produced the opposite effect from the initial idea of securing traditional clubs. This probably contributed to criticism of CBF organization. Top team qualified.

Final phase: 4-team play-offs. The final play-offs featured for the first time two teams not belonging to the top 12 traditional pool.

Second division: 24 teams.

1st phase: 24-team play-offs. Top 3 teams qualified.

Final phase: "Triangular" 3-team double round-robin. Internal promotion whatsoever was definitely abandoned.

1986 Copa Brasil

The 1986 tournament ranks as one of the most controversial ever, alongside 1987. For its detractors, it apparently revived old devils from late 70's by featuring back a single division with 80 teams, allegedly for political reason as CBF sought support from smaller teams against growing criticism of the top traditional clubs. These in turn saw this as weaker revenue possibilities, exemplified by 1985 final play-offs, combined with real increased competitiveness from these smaller provincial clubs, now also at national league level. Promotion and relegation were still taboo, and unthinkable for top tier teams. But CBF introduced for the first time this feature (which actually justified the single division formula once for all in order to level the playing field for next-year tournament with more conventional divisions of 24 teams). Apparently this was just to much egalitarianism for the traditional teams as they would make secession in 1987.

Single division: 80 participants.

1st phase: 8 groups (4 groups of 11 teams and 4 groups of 9 team). In practice the first 4 groups constituted a top-tier division featuring the 44 1985 first division teams and the other the low-tier, similar to first and second divisions. This was largely stressed by qualifying top 7 teams (out of 11) from the first groups and 1 top team (out of 9) in the low tier groups.

2nd phase: Originally, 32 teams. Instead, a judicial dispute over drug-probed match that impacted directly on qualifying threatened to deadlock the competition. As a result, CBF decided to extend qualification to extra 4 teams with better record from the upper-tier groups. Thus the phase counted 36 teams in 4 groups of 9 teams. Top 4 qualified and bottom 2 would be relegated to next-year second division, alongside those already eliminated from 1st phase.

Final phase: 16-team double play-offs.

Ranking issues: as already noted in previous tournament, the evident association of the upper-tier groups with first division makes the eliminated teams from these groups be systematically ranked higher than the eliminated teams from the lower tier.

1987 Copa União

The 1987 tournament was a direct consequence of the turmoil of the 1986 competition and rates arguably as the most controversial ever, even today. While for ranking considerations we will not enter the matter, we will consider that as in many previous edition that the two Green and Yellow modules constituted indeed a single division with two tiers, as in many tournaments before.

Ranking issues: according to this approach, all play-off finalists (including semi-finals) from both modules are awarded top placings. Other teams from Green module were given higher placing than Yellow module as the latter constituted in practice a lower tier group. As for the top placings, CBF's official placings are reconducted. For ranking purposes the impact is much lower than the real issue as the Copa União finalists only conceded 2 ranking points.

First division: 32 teams

Green module (Copa União) : 16 teams, 13 from the "Clube dos 13" association plus 3 invited teams. This top-tier did not include thus Guarani, previous-year runner-up (on penalty kicks), and América-RJ, 1986 3rd place. It included however traditional Botafogo, placed 35th in 1986 and meant to be relegated to second division according to CBF initial scheduling. Even worse, it also included Coritiba, 1985 champions but only placed 65th in 1986, thus theoretically meant to join originally third division.

Yellow module: 16 teams. 12 from the remaining 28 teams meant to originally constitute first division. 4 added teams from the originally-relegated 1986 second-phase 8 teams (bottom 2 of each group). Here also criterion for qualification was manifestly team traditionality. In order probably to save the face for Botafogo non-relegation as it placed also among these bottom 8, only the last bottom team (instead of 2) was relegated. This saved the face not only of Botafogo as it had indeed placed 8th (out 9) in its group, but also of Sport and Vitória. Inconsistently enough, Nacional also should have qualified as 8th place in its group, but one team had to be sacrificed against Coritiba secured berth in Green module. Nacional was the one, though it had a better season record than Sport, for obvious political reasons. Ironically indeed, Sport eventually clinched not only the yellow module title but also the overall title despite this in extremis qualification. Also noteworthy the relegation of Ponte Preta, bottom of its group in 1986 but with an overall better season record (12 points) than Sport itself (10 points).

Both modules followed exactly the same scheduling:

1st phase: 2 groups of 8 teams. Single split round-robin system (see early 1970 tournaments) i.e. teams for one group played first only the other group's teams in a first stage then played in single round-robin with their own group teams in a second stage, thus featuring a full single round-robin with all 16 teams. For each group, champions of each stage qualified and played an extra double play-off. Oddly, if one team happened to win both stages, it would still be obliged to play an extra double play-off (with home and draw advantage) against its own group second-stage runner-up (most oddly, it was not against the remaining overall stage runner-up), instead of directly proceeding to 2nd phase. As it happened, Atlético Mineiro and Sport, while winning both stages, had to play against Flamengo and Bangu, despite Grêmio and Vitória respectively featured better season record. While Sport managed to confirm their advantage, Atlético Mineiro was eliminated, despite an 8-point season record lead over Flamengo.

2nd phase: Double play-off to determine module winners, though irrelevant for final phase. Flamengo clinching this title claimed the national title and alongside International refused to play final phase. Sport and Guarani shared their module title after its irrelevance and an 11–11 penalty kick draw situation.

Final phase: 4-team ( finalists of both modules) single round-robin. With Flamengo and Internacional W.O., reduced to single play-off between Sport and Guarani.

Second division: 48 teams, 2 independent modules of 24 teams according to regional criteria. Top team of each module promoted.

1st phase: 4 groups of 6, top 2 qualified

2nd phase: 12 team playoffs, top 3 qualified

Final phase: 3 team single round-robin.

1988 Copa União

As the 1987 Copa União organized by "Clube do 13" proved to be even more disastrously organized than the criticized CBF, the 1988 featured the merging of both modules to feature the first ever tournament with real two divisions with promotion and relegation. Legacy from 1987 existed though as América-RJ was reinserted in first division despite refusing to participate the 1987 tournament (América-RJ, unlike Guarani, had refused to be excluded from the Green module as it had been 3rd place in 1986). Because of this, yellow-module 8th placed Internacional-SP, meant thus originally to be promoted to 1988 first division, was sacrificed despite protests. Ironically, América-RJ eventually would be relegated and Internacional-SP clinch the second division title.

First division: 24 teams

1st phase: 2 groups of 12. Split round-robin. Top 2 of each stage group qualified. In case one club would be qualified more than once, the open berth would be filled by the top remaining overall stage record. Bottom 4 overall stage teams relegated to second division.

Final phase: 8-team double play-offs. (1st overall from one group would play 4th-placed from other group, 2nd play 3rd, etc...). Home advantage according to season record Slim draw advantage (on extra time of second play-off) according to season record (as such, Vasco was eliminated by Fluminense on extra-time as both play-offs ended in a draw, and despite an 18-point season-record lead to Vasco).

Second division: 24 teams

1st phase: 4 groups of 6. Double round-robin. Top 4 qualified. Bottom 1 relegated to second division.

2nd phase: 4 groups of 4. Double round-robin. Top 2 qualified.

3rd phase: 2 groups of 4. Double round-robin. Top 2 qualified.

Final phase: 1 group of 4. Double round-robin. Top 2 promoted to first division.

1989 Campeonato Brasileiro Série A - This year featured the introduction of Copa do Brasil as the national cup competition.

First division: 22 teams ( 2 promoted from 1988 second-division)

1st phase: 2 groups of 11. Modified single split round-robin system, as bottom 3 teams from the first stage would not qualify for second stage. Instead they would dispute a 6-team round-robin group to determine relegation to second division (5-team relegation group actually as Coritiba was outright relegated in a dispute with CBF during the first stage). Bottom 4 teams relegated (3 actually on top of Coritiba). Top 1 teams from each man group qualified.

Final phase: Double play-offs with home and draw advantage to better season record (more precisely, better record team chad a one-point advantage and could choose the venue (home or away) order. Vasco choose to play first game away against São Paulo and eventually clinched the title without the need of a home match by winning 0–1.

Second division: 96 teams (combining with first division, record participation together with 2000 edition).

1st phase: 16 groups of 6, double round-robin. Top 2 qualified

Final phase: 32-team play-offs. Top 2 promoted to 1990 first division. Remaining top 20 qualified to 1990 second division.

1990 Campeonato Brasileiro Série A

First division: 20 teams

1st phase: 2 groups of 10 teams. Classical split round-robin. Winners of each stage group qualified together with top 4 remaining overall stage record. Bottom 2 overall stage record relegated to second division.

Final phase: 8-team play-offs.

Second division: 24 teams

1st phase: 4 groups of 6, double round-robin. Top 4 qualified. Bottom 4 relegated to third division.

2nd phase: 4 groups of 4. Double round-robin. Top 2 qualified.

3rd phase: 2 groups of 4. Double round robin.

Final phase: Double play-offs with home advantage to better season record. Finalists promoted to 1991 first division.

Third division: 30 teams

1st phase: 6 groups of 5, single round robin. Top 1 qualified, plus top 2 runners-up across groups.

Final phase: 8-team play-offs. Top 4 (semi-finalists) promoted to second division.

=== 1991–2000 ===
1991 Campeonato Brasileiro Série A

This championship adopted a simplified formula with a single 20-team single round-robin season, with random home and way fixtures. Top 4 teams qualified for play-offs (1st vs 4 th, 2nd vs 3rd) with tie-break given to better season record. Bottom 2 overall stage record relegated to second division (Grêmio happened to be the first Clube dos 13 team to be relegated ever, with consequences for the next tournament again).

Second division featured 64 teams with 16-team play-offs. Top 2 promoted to 1992 first division

1992 Campeonato Brasileiro Série A

Similar to 1991 with a single 20-team single round-robin season, with random home and way fixtures. Top 8 teams qualified for 2 double round-robin groups (of 4 each). Top of each group met in final play-offs. Bottom 2 overall stage record relegated to second division.

Second division featured 64 teams with 16-team play-offs. Top 2 promoted to 1992 first division

1993 Campeonato Brasileiro Série A

1993, after two relatively calm schedulings, saw the return of Clube dos 13 politics. As Grêmio had been relegated in 1991, which was relatively Ok, but morevorer failed to be promoted as widely expected, in a similar manner to catastrophic 1987, this was not Ok so two divisions of 2 groups each created. In some manner this was still more arbitrary than 1987, as in practice the two divisions indeed constituted a new first and second division. Teams from division A (16, including all Clube dos 13) could not be relegated (hence Grêmio, 11th of 1992 second division). Teams from division B (including some of 1992 first division) could be relegated (such as Paraná, champion of 1992 second division).

Top 3 of groups A and B (double internal round-robin) and top 2 of groups C and D qualified (idem). The latter played a play-off to qualify 2 tems to compose 2 4-team groups, played i double round robin. The winners of each group met in final playoffs. 8 teams (bottom 4 of groups C and D) relegated for 1993 "second" division. Ranking issues: because of this evident separation, team of group A and B have been ranked higher than C and D (except play-offs qualifiers)

1994 Campeonato Brasileiro Série A

Back to complicated schemes: 4 groups of 6 in double round-robin, top 4 of each qualified. Remaining 16 distributed in 2 groups of 8, back again to favourite split round robin qualifying 6 teams ( 2 winners of each round robin stage plus 2 better season record on overall round robin) plus 2 teams on repechage (!) from the 8 left over of first phase. Then 8-team playoffs until finals. Ranking issues: Repechage winners ranked ahead of 1st phase qualified

From 1995 until 2002, with an exception in 2000, the scheduling was relatively standardized with a normal season in single round robin with random home and away fixtures, followed by a top-8 play-off system (top qualified would meet 8th, 2nd meet 7th, etc..). And theoretically 2 teams relegated.

1995 Campeonato Brasileiro Série A: 24 teams in a single round-robin system with final playoffs. Second division with 24 teams, two promoted.

1996 Campeonato Brasileiro Série A: 24 teams and 8 team-playoffs. Fluminense relegated, which did not occur.

1997 Campeonato Brasileiro Série A: as Fluminense's relegation was even more taboo than Grêmio's in 1992, season team count was extended to 26 with 4 teams to be relegated, so as to get things "back to normal". Ironically, Fluminense again failed to avoid relegation and this time it proved too to be too much for any rescue operation. Thus after two years at the bottom of the table, Fluminense was the first team from Rio-São Paulo axis to experience relegation.

1998 Campeonato Brasileiro Série A: 24 teams and 8-team playoffs, with 4 teams relegated, in order to bring down count progressively to 20. Fluminense managed this time to be relegated to third division, the worst feat ever by a Clube dos 13 team.

1999 Campeonato Brasileiro Série A: 22 teams and 8-team playoffs. 4 meant to be relegated. Fluminense, winner of 1999 third division, promoted to second division.

In 1999, an averaging relegation system was adopted, similar to the Argentinian Primera División. The two clubs with the worst point results in the first stage of the two previous seasons were to be relegated. However, this system only lasted for a single season. During the first stage it was discovered that one player was registered with false documents. Due to this scandal CBF decided to punish the player's team cancelling the games in which this player took part. Due to this, the average points of some clubs were changed so one club lost positions and was relegated. This club immediately sued CBF, so this institution was prevented to host 2000 Brasileirão. In light of this, Clube dos 13 organized the competition, named Copa João Havelange in that year.

2000 Copa João Havelange: 116 teams and 16-team playoffs. This time, similar to 1987 and 1993, 4 near-divisions were created. The main division (Blue module) was similar to recent years top division, with 25 teams ane the top 12 qualified for the play-offs. Top 2 teams from Yellow module, with 36 teams in two groups of 18, qualified also for play-offs. The two remaining playoff spots came from winners of modules Green and White, in practice a full 3rd division, with 55 teams.

Despite this, the tournament did not raise the same issues as 1987, as Vasco da Gama, unlike Flamengo then, agreed to play the finals against Yellow module (2nd division) runner-up, São Caetano. The latter had paved their way in the play-offs by beating other high-profile Clube dos 13 teams such as Grêmio, Palmeiras and even Fluminense. Fluminense which, in the same way as Grêmio in 1993, was awarded a berth in the Blue module elite group despite just returning from third division. As then, this was also sufficient to justify maintenance of Fluminense in 2001 first division.

=== 2001–present ===
Back to the single round robin system.

2001 Campeonato Brasileiro Série A

This season featured 28 teams and reverted to the previous structure with all team played against each other once and the best 8 teams qualified to the playoffs. The quarter-finals and the semi-finals were played over one leg while the finals were played over two legs. The 4 worst teams in the first stage were relegated to Série B of the following year and replaced by 2 promoted teams to reduce the number of teams to 26.

From 2001 onwards, due to the busy schedule in the first semester in Brazil, teams playing in the Copa Libertadores have not been allowed to participate in the Copa do Brasil in the same year.

2002 Campeonato Brasileiro Série A

Same formula down to 26 teams with 8-team playoffs. Again the 4 worst teams were relegated and replaced by 2 promoted teams to reduce the number of teams to 24.

Palmeiras and Botagogo relegated for once without major rescue operation. Both would be promoted back in 2003 on normal field results. In this sense this was a major event as the change of system in 2003 could have provided in the past more-than-enough arguments for a "virada de mesa" (i.e. table turnaround, meaning under-the-table combinazioni).

The final incarnation with the introduction of the full round robin system.

2003 Campeonato Brasileiro Série A

The league featured 24 teams playing for the 1st time in the full round-robin system (called in Brazil "pontos corridos", i.e. running points), which is used in other major leagues. The formula was judged anti-Brazilian as it abandoned the cup-style system but was deemed necessary as this system was considered as the playoffs were not rewarding the more organised clubs with consistent season performance. Since then, the league has continued to follow the full round-robin system till today.

2004 Campeonato Brasileiro Série A

This season featured 24 teams playing in full round-robin system, similar to the previous year, yet 4 worst teams were relegated and replaced by 2 promoted teams to reduce the number of teams to 22.

2005 Campeonato Brasileiro Série A

This season featured 22 teams, yet again 4 worst teams were relegated and replaced by 2 promoted teams to reduce the number of teams to 20.

However, 11 matches of the 2005 competition were annulled due to a match-fixing scandal and had to be replayed.

2006 Campeonato Brasileiro Série A

Since 2006 till today, the league has featured 20 teams with 4 teams to be relegated at the end of the season and to be replaced by 4 promoted teams from the 2nd division, thus probably increasing competitiveness and chances of Clube dos 13 teams being relegated (up to this point only Grêmio, Fluminense, Palmeiras, Vasco, Corinthians, Botafogo and Atlético Mineiro experienced it). The relegation formula has been effective in increasing the profile of the second division tournament. In 2013, three teams in the lower divisions had once won the national title (Palmeiras, Sport and Guarani, the latter in the third division). Flamengo narrowly escaped relegation in 2004 and 2005, Corinthians were relegated in 2007, Vasco were relegated in 2008, 2013 and 2015, Palmeiras in 2012, Botafogo in 2014, and Internacional were relegated in 2016.

== Final Placings ==
The following tables are based after statistics from RSSSF Brasil. Placings after play-off (or short 4-team round-robin) phase do not consider previous-phase results.

=== 1971–2000 ===
| Team | 71 | 72 | 73 | 74 | 75 | 76 | 77 | 78 | 79 | 80 | 81 | 82 | 83 | 84 | 85 | 86 | 87 | 88 | 89 | 90 | 91 | 92 | 93 | 94 | 95 | 96 | 97 | 98 | 99 | 00 |
|---|---|---|---|---|---|---|---|---|---|---|---|---|---|---|---|---|---|---|---|---|---|---|---|---|---|---|---|---|---|---|
| Vasco | 10 | 5 | 13 | 1 | 19 | 7 | 5 | 3 | 2 | 5 | 5 | 9 | 5 | 2 | 9 | 9 | 11 | 5 | 1 | 14 | 11 | 3 | 11 | 13 | 20 | 18 | 1 | 10 | 5 | 1 |
| Atlético Mineiro | 1 | 5 | 5 | 9 | 20 | 3 | 2 | 33 | 13 | 2 | 9 | 17 | 3 | 17 | 3 | 3 | 5 | 10 | 8 | 5 | 3 | 13 | 17 | 3 | 8 | 3 | 7 | 9 | 2 | 24 |
| Internacional | 4 | 3 | 4 | 4 | 1 | 1 | 25 | 3 | 1 | 3 | 5 | 17 | 17 | 23 | 5 | 17 | 3 | 2 | 16 | 16 | 7 | 10 | 11 | 12 | 9 | 9 | 5 | 12 | 16 | 5 |
| Palmeiras | 7 | 1 | 1 | 5 | 7 | 9 | 13 | 2 | 3 | 9 | 17 | 65 | 9 | 17 | 9 | 9 | 9 | 16 | 5 | 5 | 6 | 11 | 1 | 1 | 5 | 5 | 2 | 5 | 10 | 5 |
| Grêmio | 4 | 5 | 7 | 5 | 13 | 13 | 5 | 5 | 17 | 5 | 1 | 2 | 9 | 3 | 21 | 9 | 5 | 3 | 11 | 3 | 19 | 29 | 9 | 14 | 15 | 1 | 15 | 5 | 18 | 3 |
| Flamengo | 14 | 9 | 24 | 9 | 5 | 5 | 17 | 21 | 5 | 1 | 5 | 1 | 1 | 5 | 5 | 9 | 3 | 5 | 9 | 11 | 9 | 1 | 7 | 17 | 21 | 13 | 3 | 11 | 12 | 19 |
| São Paulo | 2 | 5 | 2 | 9 | 7 | 25 | 1 | 29 | X | 9 | 2 | 5 | 5 | 17 | 25 | 1 | 7 | 11 | 2 | 2 | 1 | 5 | 3 | 5 | 12 | 11 | 13 | 15 | 3 | 9 |
| Corinthians | 4 | 3 | 9 | 13 | 9 | 2 | 9 | 13 | X | 9 | 25 | 3 | 9 | 3 | 13 | 5 | 17 | 15 | 6 | 1 | 5 | 5 | 3 | 2 | 14 | 12 | 18 | 1 | 1 | 28 |
| Cruzeiro | 10 | 13 | 3 | 2 | 2 | 31 | 13 | 17 | 9 | 13 | 17 | 17 | 17 | 34 | 29 | 5 | 7 | 5 | 3 | 9 | 16 | 7 | 9 | 22 | 3 | 5 | 20 | 2 | 5 | 3 |
| Santos | 7 | 9 | 9 | 3 | 26 | 20 | 13 | 17 | X | 5 | 9 | 5 | 2 | 9 | 21 | 17 | 15 | 18 | 12 | 5 | 8 | 7 | 5 | 9 | 2 | 20 | 3 | 3 | 11 | 18 |
| Botafogo | 3 | 2 | 5 | 31 | 13 | 19 | 5 | 9 | 17 | 13 | 3 | 17 | 17 | 23 | 25 | 29 | 11 | 17 | 4 | 12 | 12 | 2 | 17 | 5 | 1 | 17 | 10 | 14 | 14 | 20 |
| Guarani | X | X | 15 | 13 | 11 | 9 | 28 | 1 | 9 | 5 | 45 | 3 | 13 | 49 | 5 | 2 | 2 | 14 | 20 | 23 | 22 | 9 | 5 | 3 | 19 | 5 | 21 | 19 | 5 | 17 |
| Fluminense | 16 | 13 | 24 | 17 | 3 | 3 | 25 | 17 | 17 | 13 | 9 | 5 | 25 | 1 | 17 | 5 | 9 | 3 | 15 | 15 | 3 | 14 | 15 | 15 | 3 | 23 | 25 | 43 | 45 | 9 |
| Bahia | 13 | 18 | 15 | 17 | 25 | 15 | 9 | 5 | 38 | 25 | 9 | 9 | 17 | 23 | 13 | 5 | 13 | 1 | 18 | 3 | 13 | 18 | 15 | 5 | 17 | 22 | 23 | 41 | 25 | 9 |
| Sport | 19 | X | 32 | 27 | 11 | 30 | 17 | 5 | 59 | 17 | 9 | 9 | 5 | 49 | 5 | 29 | 1 | 5 | 21 | 22 | 18 | 12 | 13 | 11 | 18 | 10 | 12 | 5 | 22 | 5 |
| Goiás | X | X | 17 | 21 | 17 | 27 | 35 | 13 | 5 | 45 | 25 | 33 | 5 | 13 | 33 | 17 | 17 | 13 | 10 | 10 | 15 | 17 | 29 | 26 | 7 | 3 | 19 | 22 | 23 | 9 |
| Portuguesa | 17 | 23 | 29 | 13 | 9 | 17 | 29 | 21 | X | 41 | 17 | 59 | 49 | 5 | 37 | 9 | 23 | 9 | X | 18 | 10 | 16 | 19 | 10 | 10 | 2 | 7 | 3 | 21 | 21 |
| Coritiba | 10 | 9 | 7 | 17 | 22 | 7 | 49 | 17 | 3 | 3 | 49 | X | 59 | 5 | 1 | 45 | 13 | 12 | 22 | 41 | 23 | 30 | 27 | 37 | 26 | 14 | 16 | 5 | 13 | 27 |
| Vitória | X | 17 | 13 | 5 | 31 | 24 | 38 | 29 | 5 | 25 | 9 | 37 | X | X | X | 29 | 22 | 20 | 17 | 17 | 20 | 22 | 2 | 19 | 22 | 15 | 9 | 13 | 3 | 22 |
| Atlético-PR | X | X | 28 | 9 | 29 | 26 | 44 | 73 | 13 | 44 | X | 25 | 3 | 9 | X | 17 | 19 | 19 | 19 | 21 | 17 | 15 | 29 | 29 | 25 | 5 | 11 | 16 | 9 | 9 |
| Náutico | X | 19 | 34 | 13 | 15 | 11 | 52 | 33 | 45 | 17 | 9 | 17 | 13 | 5 | 17 | 17 | 29 | 26 | 13 | 13 | 14 | 19 | 23 | 24 | 45 | 27 | 29 | 45 | X | 31 |
| Santa Cruz | 15 | 13 | 11 | 35 | 3 | 15 | 5 | 5 | 31 | 17 | 17 | 65 | 49 | 17 | 37 | 21 | 15 | 22 | 39 | 37 | 25 | 23 | 27 | 37 | 33 | 33 | 43 | 33 | 24 | 29 |
| Ponte Preta | X | X | X | X | X | 5 | 13 | 9 | X | 13 | 3 | 17 | 25 | X | 9 | 33 | X | 27 | 7 | X | 37 | 37 | 33 | 37 | 45 | 41 | 28 | 17 | 5 | 9 |
| Ceará | 20 | 9 | 19 | 31 | 34 | 52 | 30 | 36 | 24 | 17 | 53 | 9 | X | X | 9 | 21 | 28 | 37 | 27 | 33 | 29 | 30 | 25 | 29 | 31 | 41 | 35 | X | 27 | 51 |

Color code:

- # : + 1 pt difference towards presumed CBF ranking
- # : + 2–3 pts difference
- # : + 4–7 pts difference
- # : + 8+ pts difference
- # : + 20+ pts difference
- # : - 1 pt difference
- # : - 2–3 pts difference
- # : - 4–7 pts difference
- # : - 8+ pts difference

=== 2001–2005 ===
| Team | 01 | 02 | 03 | 04 | 05 | 06 | 07 |
|---|---|---|---|---|---|---|---|
| Vasco | 11 | 15 | 17 | 16 | 12 | 6 | 10 |
| Internacional | 9 | 21 | 6 | 8 | 2 | 2 | 11 |
| São Paulo | 5 | 5 | 3 | 3 | 11 | 1 | 1 |
| Atlético Mineiro | 3 | 5 | 7 | 19 | 20 | 21 | 8 |
| Palmeiras | 12 | 24 | 25 | 4 | 4 | 16 | 7 |
| Flamengo | 24 | 18 | 8 | 17 | 15 | 11 | 3 |
| Corinthians | 18 | 2 | 15 | 5 | 1 | 9 | 17 |
| Grêmio | 5 | 3 | 20 | 24 | 23 | 3 | 6 |
| Cruzeiro | 21 | 9 | 1 | 13 | 8 | 10 | 5 |
| Santos | 15 | 1 | 2 | 1 | 10 | 4 | 2 |
| Botafogo | 23 | 26 | 26 | 20 | 9 | 12 | 9 |
| Fluminense | 3 | 3 | 19 | 9 | 5 | 15 | 4 |
| Guarani | 19 | 16 | 13 | 22 | 29 | 38 | 57 |
| Bahia | 5 | 19 | 24 | 28 | 40 | 46 | 42 |
| Goiás | 10 | 12 | 9 | 6 | 3 | 8 | 16 |
| Sport | 28 | 31 | 27 | 41 | 38 | 22 | 14 |
| Coritiba | 17 | 11 | 5 | 12 | 19 | 26 | 21 |
| Atlético-PR | 1 | 14 | 12 | 2 | 6 | 13 | 12 |
| Portuguesa | 13 | 23 | 37 | 35 | 26 | 34 | 23 |
| Vitória | 16 | 10 | 16 | 23 | 39 | 42 | 24 |
| Santa Cruz | 25 | 29 | 31 | 31 | 24 | 20 | 38 |
| Náutico | 33 | 46 | 29 | 29 | 25 | 23 | 15 |
| Ponte Preta | 5 | 13 | 21 | 10 | 18 | 17 | 31 |
| Paraná | 14 | 22 | 10 | 15 | 7 | 5 | 19 |

== Rankings ==
The ranking is directly based on the previous placing table: points = 49 - placing (0 if placing > 48th)

In 1971 and 1972, with 20 and 26 participants and no second division, non-participants have been awarded by default 29th placings, IE. 20 ranking points.

=== 1971–2000 ===
| № | Team | 71 | 72 | 73 | 74 | 75 | 76 | 77 | 78 | 79 | 80 | 81 | 82 | 83 | 84 | 85 | 86 | 87 | 88 | 89 | 90 | 91 | 92 | 93 | 94 | 95 | 96 | 97 | 98 | 99 | 00 | Total 71–00 |
|---|---|---|---|---|---|---|---|---|---|---|---|---|---|---|---|---|---|---|---|---|---|---|---|---|---|---|---|---|---|---|---|---|
| 1 | Vasco | 39 | 44 | 36 | 48 | 30 | 42 | 44 | 46 | 47 | 44 | 44 | 40 | 44 | 47 | 40 | 40 | 38 | 44 | 48 | 35 | 38 | 46 | 38 | 36 | 29 | 31 | 48 | 39 | 44 | 48 | 1237 |
| 2 | Atlético Mineiro | 48 | 44 | 44 | 40 | 29 | 46 | 47 | 16 | 36 | 47 | 40 | 32 | 46 | 32 | 46 | 46 | 44 | 39 | 41 | 44 | 46 | 36 | 32 | 46 | 41 | 46 | 42 | 40 | 47 | 25 | 1208 |
| 3 | International | 45 | 46 | 45 | 45 | 48 | 48 | 24 | 46 | 48 | 46 | 44 | 32 | 32 | 26 | 44 | 32 | 46 | 47 | 33 | 33 | 42 | 39 | 38 | 37 | 40 | 40 | 44 | 37 | 33 | 44 | 1204 |
| 4 | Palmeiras | 42 | 48 | 48 | 44 | 42 | 40 | 36 | 47 | 46 | 40 | 32 | 0 | 40 | 32 | 20 | 40 | 40 | 33 | 44 | 44 | 43 | 38 | 48 | 48 | 44 | 44 | 47 | 44 | 39 | 44 | 1197 |
| 5 | Grêmio | 45 | 44 | 42 | 44 | 36 | 36 | 44 | 44 | 32 | 44 | 48 | 46 | 40 | 46 | 30 | 40 | 44 | 46 | 38 | 46 | 30 | 20 | 40 | 35 | 34 | 48 | 34 | 44 | 31 | 46 | 1196 |
| 6 | Flamengo | 35 | 40 | 25 | 40 | 44 | 44 | 32 | 28 | 44 | 48 | 44 | 48 | 48 | 44 | 44 | 40 | 46 | 44 | 40 | 38 | 40 | 48 | 42 | 32 | 28 | 36 | 46 | 38 | 37 | 30 | 1193 |
| 7 | São Paulo | 47 | 44 | 47 | 40 | 42 | 24 | 48 | 20 | 0 | 40 | 47 | 44 | 44 | 32 | 24 | 48 | 42 | 38 | 47 | 47 | 48 | 44 | 46 | 44 | 37 | 38 | 36 | 34 | 46 | 40 | 1178 |
| 8 | Corinthians | 45 | 46 | 40 | 36 | 40 | 47 | 40 | 36 | 0 | 40 | 24 | 46 | 40 | 46 | 36 | 44 | 32 | 34 | 43 | 48 | 44 | 44 | 46 | 47 | 35 | 37 | 31 | 48 | 48 | 21 | 1164 |
| 9 | Cruzeiro | 39 | 36 | 46 | 47 | 47 | 18 | 36 | 32 | 40 | 36 | 32 | 32 | 32 | 15 | 20 | 44 | 42 | 44 | 46 | 40 | 33 | 42 | 40 | 27 | 46 | 44 | 29 | 47 | 44 | 46 | 1122 |
| 10 | Santos | 42 | 40 | 40 | 46 | 23 | 29 | 36 | 32 | 0 | 44 | 40 | 44 | 47 | 40 | 28 | 32 | 34 | 31 | 37 | 44 | 41 | 42 | 44 | 40 | 47 | 29 | 46 | 46 | 38 | 31 | 1113 |
| 11 | Botafogo | 46 | 47 | 44 | 18 | 36 | 30 | 44 | 40 | 32 | 36 | 46 | 32 | 32 | 26 | 24 | 20 | 38 | 32 | 45 | 37 | 37 | 47 | 32 | 44 | 48 | 32 | 39 | 35 | 35 | 29 | 1083 |
| 12 | Guarani | 25 | 20 | 34 | 36 | 38 | 40 | 24 | 48 | 40 | 44 | 4 | 46 | 36 | 0 | 44 | 47 | 47 | 35 | 29 | 26 | 27 | 40 | 44 | 46 | 30 | 44 | 28 | 30 | 44 | 32 | 1023 |
| 13 | Fluminense | 33 | 36 | 25 | 32 | 46 | 46 | 24 | 32 | 32 | 36 | 40 | 44 | 24 | 48 | 32 | 44 | 40 | 46 | 34 | 34 | 46 | 35 | 34 | 34 | 46 | 26 | 24 | 6 | 4 | 40 | 1020 |
| 14 | Bahia | 36 | 20 | 34 | 32 | 24 | 34 | 40 | 44 | 11 | 24 | 40 | 40 | 32 | 26 | 36 | 44 | 36 | 48 | 31 | 46 | 36 | 31 | 34 | 44 | 32 | 27 | 26 | 8 | 24 | 40 | 980 |
| 15 | Sport | 30 | 20 | 17 | 22 | 38 | 19 | 32 | 44 | 0 | 32 | 40 | 40 | 44 | 0 | 44 | 20 | 48 | 44 | 28 | 27 | 31 | 37 | 36 | 38 | 31 | 39 | 37 | 44 | 27 | 44 | 953 |
| 16 | Goiás | 20 | 20 | 32 | 28 | 32 | 22 | 14 | 36 | 44 | 4 | 24 | 16 | 44 | 36 | 24 | 32 | 32 | 36 | 39 | 39 | 34 | 32 | 20 | 23 | 42 | 46 | 30 | 27 | 26 | 40 | 886 |
| 17 | Portuguesa | 32 | 26 | 20 | 36 | 40 | 32 | 20 | 28 | 0 | 8 | 32 | 0 | 0 | 44 | 22 | 40 | 26 | 40 | 0 | 31 | 39 | 33 | 30 | 39 | 39 | 47 | 42 | 46 | 28 | 28 | 836 |
| 18 | Coritiba | 39 | 40 | 42 | 32 | 27 | 42 | 0 | 32 | 46 | 46 | 0 | 0 | 0 | 44 | 48 | 4 | 36 | 37 | 27 | 8 | 26 | 19 | 22 | 12 | 23 | 35 | 33 | 44 | 36 | 22 | 822 |
| 19 | Vitória | 20 | 29 | 36 | 44 | 16 | 25 | 11 | 20 | 44 | 24 | 40 | 12 | 0 | 0 | 0 | 20 | 28 | 29 | 32 | 32 | 29 | 27 | 47 | 30 | 27 | 34 | 40 | 36 | 46 | 27 | 807 |
| 20 | Atlético-PR | 20 | 20 | 21 | 40 | 24 | 23 | 5 | 0 | 36 | 4 | 0 | 24 | 46 | 40 | 0 | 32 | 30 | 30 | 30 | 28 | 32 | 34 | 20 | 20 | 24 | 44 | 38 | 33 | 40 | 40 | 774 |
| 21 | Náutico | 20 | 30 | 15 | 36 | 34 | 38 | 0 | 16 | 4 | 32 | 40 | 32 | 36 | 44 | 32 | 28 | 22 | 23 | 36 | 36 | 35 | 30 | 26 | 25 | 4 | 22 | 20 | 4 | 0 | 18 | 736 |
| 22 | Santa Cruz | 34 | 36 | 38 | 14 | 46 | 34 | 44 | 44 | 18 | 32 | 32 | 0 | 0 | 32 | 22 | 28 | 34 | 27 | 10 | 12 | 24 | 26 | 22 | 12 | 16 | 16 | 6 | 16 | 25 | 20 | 710 |
| 23 | Ponte Preta | 20 | 20 | 0 | 0 | 0 | 44 | 36 | 40 | 0 | 36 | 46 | 32 | 24 | 0 | 40 | 16 | 0 | 22 | 42 | 0 | 12 | 12 | 16 | 12 | 4 | 8 | 21 | 32 | 44 | 40 | 627 |
| 24 | Ceará | 29 | 40 | 30 | 18 | 20 | 0 | 19 | 13 | 25 | 32 | 0 | 40 | 0 | 0 | 40 | 28 | 24 | 12 | 22 | 16 | 20 | 19 | 24 | 20 | 18 | 8 | 14 | 0 | 22 | 0 | 544 |

=== 2001–2007 and Overall ===
| № | Team | 01 | 02 | 03 | 04 | 05 | 06 | 07 | Rank 01–07 | Total 01–07 | Total 71–07 | CBF Rank | CBF Total |
|---|---|---|---|---|---|---|---|---|---|---|---|---|---|
| 1 | Vasco | 38 | 34 | 32 | 33 | 37 | 43 | 39 | 11 | 256 | 1493 | 1 | 1860 |
| 2 | São Paulo | 44 | 44 | 46 | 46 | 38 | 48 | 48 | 1 | 314 | 1492 | 2 | 1835 |
| 3 | Internacional | 40 | 28 | 43 | 41 | 47 | 47 | 38 | 4 | 284 | 1488 | 8 | 1753 |
| 4 | Atlético Mineiro | 46 | 44 | 42 | 30 | 29 | 28 | 41 | 9 | 260 | 1468 | 3 | 1800 |
| 5 | Grêmio | 44 | 46 | 29 | 25 | 26 | 46 | 43 | 10 | 259 | 1455 | 4 | 1795 |
| 6 | Palmeiras | 37 | 25 | 24 | 45 | 45 | 33 | 42 | 12 | 251 | 1448 | 6 | 1764 |
| 7 | Corinthians | 31 | 47 | 34 | 44 | 48 | 40 | 32 | 7 | 276 | 1440 | 5 | 1784 |
| 7 | Flamengo | 25 | 31 | 41 | 32 | 34 | 38 | 46 | 15 | 247 | 1440 | 7 | 1755 |
| 9 | Santos | 34 | 48 | 47 | 48 | 39 | 45 | 47 | 2 | 308 | 1421 | 9 | 1635 |
| 10 | Cruzeiro | 28 | 40 | 48 | 36 | 41 | 39 | 44 | 7 | 276 | 1398 | 10 | 1628 |
| 11 | Fluminense | 46 | 46 | 30 | 40 | 44 | 34 | 45 | 3 | 285 | 1305 | 11 | 1475 |
| 12 | Botafogo | 26 | 23 | 23 | 29 | 40 | 37 | 40 | 20 | 218 | 1301 | 12 | 1465 |
| 13 | Guarani | 30 | 33 | 36 | 27 | 20 | 11 | 0 | 23 | 157 | 1180 | 13 | 1417 |
| 14 | Goiás | 39 | 37 | 40 | 43 | 46 | 41 | 33 | 6 | 279 | 1173 | 14 | 1322 |
| 15 | Bahia | 44 | 30 | 25 | 21 | 9 | 3 | 7 | 29 | 139 | 1119 | 18 | 1234 |
| 16 | Sport | 21 | 18 | 22 | 8 | 11 | 27 | 35 | 28 | 142 | 1095 | 15 | 1302 |
| 17 | Atlético-PR | 48 | 35 | 37 | 47 | 43 | 36 | 37 | 5 | 283 | 1057 | 19 | 1208 |
| 18 | Coritiba | 32 | 38 | 44 | 37 | 30 | 23 | 28 | 18 | 232 | 1054 | 16 | 1298 |
| 19 | Portuguesa | 36 | 26 | 12 | 14 | 23 | 15 | 26 | 24 | 152 | 988 | 17 | 1281 |
| 20 | Vitória | 33 | 39 | 33 | 26 | 10 | 7 | 25 | 21 | 173 | 980 | 20 | 1135 |
| 21 | Náutico | 16 | 3 | 20 | 20 | 24 | 26 | 34 | 27 | 143 | 879 | 22 | 1059 |
| 22 | Santa Cruz | 24 | 20 | 18 | 18 | 25 | 29 | 11 | 26 | 145 | 855 | 21 | 1083 |
| 22 | Ponte Preta | 44 | 36 | 28 | 39 | 31 | 32 | 18 | 19 | 228 | 855 | 24 | 958 |
| 24 | Paraná | 35 | 27 | 39 | 34 | 42 | 44 | 30 | 12 | 251 | 736 | 23 | 979 |

- N.B.: CBF ranking points obtained from CBF official ranking which features points from the Brazilian League and the Brazilian Cup. Points from Brazilian Cup have been discounted according to CBF point-awarding rules. Data from Copa do Brasil (Brazilian Cup) based on RSSSF Brazil.
- N.B 2: CBF does not include in its official ranking points from the 2000 tournament, though it officially recognizes it. This stems from the fact the CBF ranking's only purpose is to establish the Brazilian Cup participants list based on tournaments organized by it, and is not linked to the official placing list. So the points of the 2000 tournament have been added here, always according to CBF rules.

== Other rankings ==
=== Placar (or top 10) ===
Placar, Brazil's main soccer magazine proposes a similar but simpler formula, only taking into account the top 10 placings. I.e, points = 11 - placing (0 if placing > 10th).

==== 1971–2000 ====
| № | Team | 71 | 72 | 73 | 74 | 75 | 76 | 77 | 78 | 79 | 80 | 81 | 82 | 83 | 84 | 85 | 86 | 87 | 88 | 89 | 90 | 91 | 92 | 93 | 94 | 95 | 96 | 97 | 98 | 99 | 00 | Total 71–00 |
|---|---|---|---|---|---|---|---|---|---|---|---|---|---|---|---|---|---|---|---|---|---|---|---|---|---|---|---|---|---|---|---|---|
| 1 | São Paulo | 9 | 6 | 9 | 2 | 4 | 0 | 10 | 0 | 0 | 2 | 9 | 6 | 6 | 0 | 0 | 10 | 4 | 0 | 9 | 9 | 10 | 6 | 8 | 6 | 0 | 0 | 0 | 0 | 8 | 2 | 135 |
| 2 | Atlético Mineiro | 10 | 6 | 6 | 2 | 0 | 8 | 9 | 0 | 0 | 9 | 2 | 0 | 8 | 0 | 8 | 8 | 6 | 1 | 3 | 6 | 8 | 0 | 0 | 8 | 3 | 8 | 4 | 2 | 9 | 0 | 134 |
| 3 | Palmeiras | 4 | 10 | 10 | 6 | 4 | 2 | 0 | 9 | 8 | 2 | 0 | 0 | 2 | 0 | 0 | 2 | 2 | 0 | 6 | 6 | 5 | 0 | 10 | 10 | 6 | 6 | 9 | 6 | 1 | 6 | 132 |
| 4 | Vasco | 1 | 6 | 0 | 10 | 0 | 4 | 6 | 8 | 9 | 6 | 6 | 2 | 6 | 9 | 2 | 2 | 0 | 6 | 10 | 0 | 0 | 8 | 0 | 0 | 0 | 0 | 10 | 1 | 6 | 10 | 128 |
| 5 | Internacional | 7 | 8 | 7 | 7 | 10 | 10 | 0 | 8 | 10 | 8 | 6 | 0 | 0 | 0 | 6 | 0 | 8 | 9 | 0 | 0 | 4 | 1 | 0 | 0 | 2 | 2 | 6 | 0 | 0 | 6 | 126 |
| 6 | Corinthians | 7 | 8 | 2 | 0 | 2 | 9 | 2 | 0 | 0 | 2 | 0 | 8 | 2 | 8 | 0 | 6 | 0 | 0 | 5 | 10 | 6 | 6 | 8 | 9 | 0 | 0 | 0 | 10 | 10 | 0 | 120 |
| 6 | Grêmio | 7 | 6 | 4 | 6 | 0 | 0 | 6 | 6 | 0 | 6 | 10 | 9 | 2 | 8 | 0 | 2 | 6 | 8 | 0 | 8 | 0 | 0 | 2 | 0 | 0 | 10 | 0 | 6 | 0 | 8 | 120 |
| 8 | Flamengo | 0 | 2 | 0 | 2 | 6 | 6 | 0 | 0 | 6 | 10 | 6 | 10 | 10 | 6 | 6 | 2 | 8 | 6 | 2 | 0 | 2 | 10 | 4 | 0 | 0 | 0 | 8 | 0 | 0 | 0 | 112 |
| 9 | Cruzeiro | 1 | 0 | 8 | 9 | 9 | 0 | 0 | 0 | 2 | 0 | 0 | 0 | 0 | 0 | 0 | 6 | 4 | 6 | 8 | 2 | 0 | 4 | 2 | 0 | 8 | 6 | 0 | 9 | 6 | 8 | 98 |
| 10 | Santos | 4 | 2 | 2 | 8 | 0 | 0 | 0 | 0 | 0 | 6 | 2 | 6 | 9 | 2 | 0 | 0 | 0 | 0 | 0 | 6 | 3 | 4 | 6 | 2 | 9 | 0 | 8 | 8 | 0 | 0 | 87 |
| 11 | Guarani | 0 | 0 | 0 | 0 | 0 | 2 | 0 | 10 | 2 | 6 | 0 | 8 | 0 | 0 | 6 | 9 | 9 | 0 | 0 | 0 | 0 | 2 | 6 | 8 | 0 | 6 | 0 | 0 | 6 | 0 | 80 |
| 12 | Botafogo | 8 | 9 | 6 | 0 | 0 | 0 | 6 | 2 | 0 | 0 | 8 | 0 | 0 | 0 | 0 | 0 | 0 | 0 | 7 | 0 | 0 | 9 | 0 | 6 | 10 | 0 | 1 | 0 | 0 | 0 | 72 |
| 13 | Fluminense | 0 | 0 | 0 | 0 | 8 | 8 | 0 | 0 | 0 | 0 | 2 | 6 | 0 | 10 | 0 | 6 | 2 | 8 | 0 | 0 | 8 | 0 | 0 | 0 | 8 | 0 | 0 | 0 | 0 | 2 | 68 |
| 14 | Sport | 0 | 0 | 0 | 0 | 0 | 0 | 0 | 6 | 0 | 0 | 2 | 2 | 6 | 0 | 6 | 0 | 10 | 6 | 0 | 0 | 0 | 0 | 0 | 0 | 0 | 1 | 0 | 6 | 0 | 6 | 51 |
| 15 | Coritiba | 1 | 2 | 4 | 0 | 0 | 4 | 0 | 0 | 8 | 8 | 0 | 0 | 0 | 6 | 10 | 0 | 0 | 0 | 0 | 0 | 0 | 0 | 0 | 0 | 0 | 0 | 0 | 6 | 0 | 0 | 49 |
| 16 | Bahia | 0 | 0 | 0 | 0 | 0 | 0 | 2 | 6 | 0 | 0 | 2 | 2 | 0 | 0 | 0 | 6 | 0 | 10 | 0 | 8 | 0 | 0 | 0 | 6 | 0 | 0 | 0 | 0 | 0 | 2 | 44 |

==== 2001–2005 and Overall ====
| № | Team | 01 | 02 | 03 | 04 | 05 | Rank 01–05 | Total 01–05 | Total 71–05 | Placar Rank | Placar Total |
|---|---|---|---|---|---|---|---|---|---|---|---|
| 1 | São Paulo | 6 | 6 | 8 | 8 | 0 | 2 | 28 | 163 | 1 | 153 |
| 2 | Atlético Mineiro | 8 | 6 | 4 | 0 | 0 | 8 | 18 | 152 | 4 | 143 |
| 3 | Palmeiras | 0 | 0 | 0 | 7 | 7 | 11 | 14 | 146 | 3 | 138 |
| 4 | Corinthians | 0 | 9 | 0 | 6 | 10 | 3 | 25 | 145 | 2 | 145 |
| 5 | Internacional | 2 | 0 | 5 | 3 | 9 | 7 | 19 | 144 | 5 | 137 |
| 6 | Grêmio | 6 | 8 | 0 | 0 | 0 | 11 | 14 | 134 | 7 | 115 |
| 7 | Vasco | 0 | 0 | 0 | 0 | 0 | 21 | 0 | 128 | 9 | 105 |
| 8 | Santos | 0 | 10 | 9 | 10 | 1 | 1 | 30 | 117 | 8 | 109 |
| 9 | Flamengo | 0 | 0 | 3 | 0 | 0 | 18 | 3 | 115 | 10 | 101 |
| 10 | Cruzeiro | 0 | 2 | 10 | 0 | 3 | 10 | 15 | 113 | 6 | 118 |
| 11 | Fluminense | 8 | 8 | 0 | 2 | 6 | 4 | 24 | 92 | 11 | 87 |
| 12 | Guarani | 0 | 0 | 0 | 0 | 0 | 21 | 0 | 80 | 13 | 60 |
| 13 | Botafogo | 0 | 0 | 0 | 0 | 2 | 19 | 2 | 74 | 12 | 71 |
| 14 | Bahia | 0 | 0 | 6 | 0 | 0 | 15 | 6 | 55 | 19 | 37 |
| 15 | Sport | 0 | 0 | 0 | 0 | 0 | 21 | 0 | 51 | 15 | 40 |
| 16 | Coritiba | 6 | 0 | 0 | 0 | 0 | 15 | 6 | 50 | 14 | 51 |

Remarks: Coincidentally or not (Placar is a São Paulo-based magazine with a reputation for mild partiality), this top 10 criterion is not neutral as it favours teams from São Paulo by minimizing past relegations on non-participations (especially in the 80's). Also Placar apparently does not compute the 1987 season (as can be deduced from Guarani, Flamengo and Sport appearing strongly penalized) and the 2000 season (Vasco and Grêmio appear penalized). Vasco is penalized in 23 points overall (coincidentally or not again, Vasco is often the main target of São Paulo sports press) and appears as 9th despite comfortably holding 1st place on CBF's ranking. Cruzeiro is actually awarded more points despite having placed well in 2000 (which supposedly have not been computed), so the figures seem unreliable. Unfortunately Placar does not display on their ranking page their choices and criteria and furthermore the detail by year.

=== Top 20 ===
A probable trade-off between CBF and Placar could be a ranking based on the top 20 results. This on one hand would minimize relegation (as per Placar) issue but also reward consistency (as per CBF, which indeed already penalizes its way teams placed lower than 20th).

==== 1971–2000 ====
| № | Team | 71 | 72 | 73 | 74 | 75 | 76 | 77 | 78 | 79 | 80 | 81 | 82 | 83 | 84 | 85 | 86 | 87 | 88 | 89 | 90 | 91 | 92 | 93 | 94 | 95 | 96 | 97 | 98 | 99 | 00 | Total 71–00 |
|---|---|---|---|---|---|---|---|---|---|---|---|---|---|---|---|---|---|---|---|---|---|---|---|---|---|---|---|---|---|---|---|---|
| 1 | Vasco | 11 | 16 | 8 | 20 | 2 | 14 | 16 | 18 | 19 | 16 | 16 | 12 | 16 | 19 | 12 | 12 | 10 | 16 | 20 | 7 | 10 | 18 | 10 | 8 | 1 | 3 | 20 | 11 | 16 | 20 | 397 |
| 2 | Palmeiras | 14 | 20 | 20 | 16 | 14 | 12 | 8 | 19 | 18 | 12 | 4 | 0 | 12 | 4 | 0 | 12 | 12 | 5 | 16 | 16 | 15 | 10 | 20 | 20 | 16 | 16 | 19 | 16 | 11 | 16 | 393 |
| 3 | Atlético Mineiro | 20 | 16 | 16 | 12 | 1 | 18 | 19 | 0 | 8 | 19 | 12 | 4 | 18 | 4 | 18 | 18 | 16 | 11 | 13 | 16 | 18 | 8 | 4 | 18 | 13 | 18 | 14 | 12 | 19 | 0 | 383 |
| 4 | São Paulo | 19 | 16 | 19 | 12 | 14 | 0 | 20 | 0 | 0 | 12 | 19 | 16 | 16 | 4 | 0 | 20 | 14 | 10 | 19 | 19 | 20 | 16 | 18 | 16 | 9 | 10 | 8 | 6 | 18 | 12 | 382 |
| 5 | Internacional | 17 | 18 | 17 | 17 | 20 | 20 | 0 | 18 | 20 | 18 | 16 | 4 | 4 | 0 | 16 | 4 | 18 | 19 | 5 | 5 | 14 | 11 | 10 | 9 | 12 | 12 | 16 | 9 | 5 | 16 | 370 |
| 6 | Grêmio | 17 | 16 | 14 | 16 | 8 | 8 | 16 | 16 | 4 | 16 | 20 | 19 | 12 | 18 | 0 | 12 | 16 | 18 | 10 | 18 | 2 | 0 | 12 | 7 | 6 | 20 | 6 | 16 | 3 | 18 | 364 |
| 7 | Corinthians | 17 | 18 | 12 | 8 | 12 | 19 | 12 | 8 | 0 | 12 | 0 | 18 | 12 | 18 | 8 | 16 | 4 | 6 | 15 | 20 | 16 | 16 | 18 | 19 | 7 | 9 | 3 | 20 | 20 | 0 | 363 |
| 8 | Flamengo | 7 | 12 | 0 | 12 | 16 | 16 | 4 | 0 | 16 | 20 | 16 | 20 | 20 | 16 | 16 | 12 | 18 | 16 | 12 | 10 | 12 | 20 | 14 | 4 | 0 | 8 | 18 | 10 | 9 | 2 | 356 |
| 9 | Cruzeiro | 11 | 8 | 18 | 19 | 19 | 0 | 8 | 4 | 12 | 8 | 4 | 4 | 4 | 0 | 0 | 16 | 14 | 16 | 18 | 12 | 5 | 14 | 12 | 0 | 18 | 16 | 1 | 19 | 16 | 18 | 314 |
| 10 | Santos | 14 | 12 | 12 | 18 | 0 | 1 | 8 | 4 | 0 | 16 | 12 | 16 | 19 | 12 | 0 | 4 | 6 | 3 | 9 | 16 | 13 | 14 | 16 | 12 | 19 | 1 | 18 | 18 | 10 | 3 | 306 |
| 11 | Botafogo | 18 | 19 | 16 | 0 | 8 | 2 | 16 | 12 | 4 | 8 | 18 | 4 | 4 | 0 | 0 | 0 | 10 | 4 | 17 | 9 | 9 | 19 | 4 | 16 | 20 | 4 | 11 | 7 | 7 | 1 | 267 |
| 12 | Guarani | 0 | 0 | 6 | 8 | 10 | 12 | 0 | 20 | 12 | 16 | 0 | 18 | 8 | 0 | 16 | 19 | 19 | 7 | 1 | 0 | 0 | 12 | 16 | 18 | 2 | 16 | 0 | 2 | 16 | 4 | 258 |
| 13 | Fluminense | 5 | 8 | 0 | 4 | 18 | 18 | 0 | 4 | 4 | 8 | 12 | 16 | 0 | 20 | 4 | 16 | 12 | 18 | 6 | 6 | 18 | 7 | 6 | 6 | 18 | 0 | 0 | 0 | 0 | 12 | 246 |
| 14 | Sport | 2 | 0 | 0 | 0 | 10 | 0 | 4 | 16 | 0 | 4 | 12 | 12 | 16 | 0 | 16 | 0 | 20 | 16 | 0 | 0 | 3 | 9 | 8 | 10 | 3 | 11 | 9 | 16 | 0 | 16 | 213 |
| 15 | Bahia | 8 | 0 | 6 | 4 | 0 | 6 | 12 | 16 | 0 | 0 | 12 | 12 | 4 | 0 | 8 | 16 | 8 | 20 | 3 | 18 | 8 | 3 | 6 | 16 | 4 | 0 | 0 | 0 | 0 | 12 | 202 |
| 16 | Coritiba | 11 | 12 | 14 | 4 | 0 | 14 | 0 | 4 | 18 | 18 | 0 | 0 | 0 | 16 | 20 | 0 | 8 | 9 | 0 | 0 | 0 | 0 | 0 | 0 | 0 | 7 | 5 | 16 | 8 | 0 | 184 |

==== 2001–2013 and Overall ====
| № | Team | 01 | 02 | 03 | 04 | 05 | 06 | 07 | 08 | 09 | 10 | 11 | 12 | 13 | Rank 01–13 | Total 01–13 | Total 71–13 |
|---|---|---|---|---|---|---|---|---|---|---|---|---|---|---|---|---|---|
| 1 | São Paulo | 16 | 16 | 18 | 18 | 10 | 20 | 20 | 20 | 18 | 12 | 15 | 17 | 12 | 1 | 210 | 592 |
| 2 | Internacional | 12 | 0 | 15 | 13 | 19 | 19 | 10 | 15 | 19 | 14 | 16 | 11 | 8 | 3 | 171 | 541 |
| 3 | Grêmio | 16 | 18 | 1 | 0 | 0 | 18 | 15 | 19 | 13 | 17 | 9 | 18 | 19 | 6 | 163 | 527 |
| 4 | Corinthians | 3 | 19 | 6 | 16 | 20 | 12 | 4 | 0 | 11 | 18 | 20 | 15 | 11 | 7 | 155 | 518 |
| 5 | Palmeiras | 9 | 0 | 0 | 17 | 17 | 5 | 14 | 17 | 16 | 11 | 10 | 3 | 0 | 12 | 119 | 512 |
| 5 | Atlético Mineiro | 18 | 16 | 14 | 2 | 1 | 0 | 13 | 9 | 14 | 8 | 6 | 19 | 13 | 9 | 129 | 512 |
| 7 | Vasco da Gama | 10 | 6 | 4 | 5 | 9 | 15 | 11 | 3 | 0 | 10 | 19 | 16 | 3 | 14 | 111 | 508 |
| 8 | Flamengo | 0 | 3 | 13 | 4 | 6 | 10 | 18 | 16 | 20 | 7 | 17 | 10 | 5 | 10 | 129 | 485 |
| 8 | Cruzeiro | 0 | 12 | 20 | 8 | 13 | 11 | 16 | 18 | 17 | 19 | 5 | 12 | 20 | 4 | 171 | 485 |
| 10 | Santos | 6 | 20 | 19 | 20 | 11 | 17 | 19 | 6 | 9 | 13 | 11 | 13 | 14 | 2 | 178 | 484 |
| 11 | Fluminense | 18 | 18 | 2 | 12 | 16 | 6 | 17 | 7 | 5 | 20 | 18 | 20 | 6 | 5 | 164 | 410 |
| 12 | Botafogo | 0 | 0 | 0 | 1 | 12 | 9 | 12 | 14 | 6 | 15 | 12 | 14 | 17 | 13 | 112 | 379 |
| 13 | Guarani | 2 | 5 | 8 | 0 | 0 | 0 | 0 | 0 | 0 | 3 | 0 | 0 | 0 | 27 | 18 | 276 |
| 14 | Goiás | 11 | 9 | 12 | 15 | 18 | 13 | 5 | 13 | 12 | 2 | 0 | 0 | 15 | 11 | 125 | 275 |
| 15 | Coritiba | 4 | 10 | 16 | 9 | 2 | 0 | 0 | 12 | 4 | 0 | 13 | 8 | 10 | 15 | 88 | 272 |
| 16 | Atlético-PR | 20 | 7 | 9 | 19 | 15 | 8 | 9 | 8 | 7 | 16 | 4 | 0 | 18 | 9 | 140 | 253 |

It can be noted that, according to this ranking, places 4 through 7 remain closely fought and could be totally shuffled by any result on a single year (especially with Vasco da Gama, currently relegated to second division and meant to drop automatically three or more places). Also, the places 8 to 10, with Flamengo, Cruzeiro and Santos, and 13–15, with Guarani, Goiás and Coritiba, appear tightly disputed.
