= 2002 Copa do Brasil =

Copa do Brasil 2002

Tournament details
- Country: Brazil
- Dates: February 22 - May 15
- Teams: 64

Final positions
- Champions: Corinthians (SP)
- Runners-up: Brasiliense (DF)

Tournament statistics
- Matches played: 117
- Goals scored: 369 (3.15 per match)
- Top goal scorer: Deivid (13)

The Copa do Brasil 2002 was the 14th staging of the Copa do Brasil.

The competition started on February 13, 2002 and concluded on May 15, 2002 with the second leg of the final, held at the Boca do Jacaré in Taguatinga in the Federal District, in which Corinthians lifted the trophy for the second time after a 1–1 draw with Brasiliense.

== Knockout round ==
First round
Atlético-RR | 0 | 0
Paysandu-PA | 1 | 3
Sampaio Corrêa-MA | 2 | 1
Fluminense | 1 | 5
Coritiba-PR | 2 | 1
Ponte Preta-SP | 1 | 4
Anapolina-GO | 1
Juventude-RS | 3
Náutico-PE | 2 | 4
Remo-PA | 2 | 3
Vasco da Gama-AC | 2 | 0
Brasiliense-DF (a) | 1 | 1
Juazeiro-BA | 1 | 1
Confiança-SE | 1 | 4
ASA-AL (a) | 1 | 1
Palmeiras-SP | 0 | 2

Second round
Paysandu-PA | 1 | 0
Fluminense-RJ | 2 | 2
Ponte Preta-SP | 0 | 1
Juventude-RS | 2 | 0
Náutico-PE | 2 | 0
Brasiliense-DF | 3 | 0
Confiança-SE | 1 | 4
ASA-AL | 2 | 0

Round of 16
Fluminense-RJ | 1 | 2
Juventude-RS | 1 | 1
Brasiliense-DF | 0 | 4
Confiança-SE | 0 | 1

Quarterfinals
Fluminense-RJ | 0 | 0
Brasiliense-DF | 1 | 1

First round
São Raimundo-AM | 1 | 0
América-RN | 1 | 4
Corinthians-RN | 0
Bahia-BA | 2
Criciúma-SC | 1 | 2
Gama-DF | 0 | 1
Palmas-TO | 0 | 2
Portuguesa-SP | 1 | 5
Comercial-MS | 1 | 0
Internacional-RS | 1 | 2
Ji-Paraná-RO | 0 | 2
Santos-SP | 0 | 4
Botafogo-SP | 1 | 2
Sport-PE | 1 | 7
Juventude-MS | 2 | 0
Atlético Mineiro | 1 | 2

Second round
América-RN | 0 | 0
Bahia-BA | 1 | 3
Criciúma-SC | 3 | 0
Portuguesa-SP (a) | 2 | 1
Internacional-RS | 3 | 1
Santos-SP | 3 | 0
Sport-PE | 2 | 0
Atlético Mineiro | 1 | 3

Round of 16
Bahia-BA | 3 | 2
Portuguesa-SP | 0 | 2
Internacional-RS | 0 | 3
Atlético Mineiro | 2 | 2

Quarterfinals
Bahia-BA | 2 | 3
Atlético Mineiro | 1 | 4

First round
Botafogo-PB | 1
Figueirense-SC | 3
CENE-MS | 0 | 0
Vitória-BA | 0 | 6
Independente-AP | 1 | 0
Flamengo-PI | 1 | 1
Treze-PB | 1 | 1
São Paulo-SP | 0 | 4
Moto Club-MA | 1 | 0
CSA-AL | 2 | 2
Rio Negro-AM | 0 | 0
Ceará-CE | 1 | 2
Santa Cruz-PE | 3
Caxias-RS | 1
Sergipe-SE | 1 | 1
Vasco da Gama-RJ | 1 | 2

Second round
Figueirense-SC | 3 | 3
Vitória-BA | 1 | 3
Flamengo-PI | 0
São Paulo-SP | 5
CSA-AL | 0 | 3
Ceará-CE | 0 | 2
Santa Cruz-PE | 1 | 3
Vasco da Gama-RJ | 2 | 3

Round of 16
Figueirense-SC | 3 | 1
São Paulo-SP | 1 | 6
CSA-AL | 2 | 0
Vasco da Gama-RJ | 1 | 4

Quarterfinals
São Paulo-SP | 4 | 0
Vasco da Gama-RJ | 0 | 1

First round
Vila Nova-GO | 2
Fortaleza-CE | 4
Alegrense-ES | 2 | 0
Botafogo-RJ (a) | 2 | 0
Bragantino-SP | 1
Paraná-PR | 3
América-MG | 1 | 1
Guarani-SP | 2 | 2
Bandeirante-DF | 1
Cruzeiro-MG | 4
Londrina-PR | 4 | 2
Goiás-GO | 4 | 1
Americano-RJ | 3 | 1
Joinville-SC | 0 | 3
River-PI | 1 | 0
Corinthians-SP | 2 | 2

Second round
Fortaleza-CE | 1 | 1
Botafogo-RJ | 2 | 3
Paraná-PR | 2 | 1
Guarani-SP | 0 | 1
Cruzeiro-MG | 0 | 2
Londrina-PR | 1 | 0
Americano-RJ | 2
Corinthians-SP | 6

Round of 16
Botafogo-RJ | 1 | 1
Paraná-PR | 3 | 1
Cruzeiro-MG | 2 | 2
Corinthians-SP | 2 | 3

Quarterfinals
Paraná-PR | 1 | 1
Corinthians-SP | 3 | 0

== Final phase ==
Semifinals
1 | Brasiliense-DF | 3 | 2
4 | Atlético Mineiro | 0 | 1
3 | São Paulo-SP | 0 | 2
2 | Corinthians-SP | 2 | 1

Finals
Brasiliense-DF | 1 | 1 | 2
Corinthians-SP | 2 | 1 | 3

== Champion ==
Copa do Brasil 2002

Second title
