= Copa do Brasil =

Brazilian football competition

- Founded: 1989
- Region: Brazil
- Teams: 126
- Qualifier for: Copa Libertadores; Supercopa do Brasil
- Current champions: Corinthians (4th title)
- Most championships: Cruzeiro (6 titles)
- Broadcaster(s): Domestic; Rede Globo; SporTV; Premiere; Amazon Prime Video; International; OneFootball
- Motto: A Competição mais Democrática
- Website: cbf.com.br
- 2026 Copa do Brasil

The Copa do Brasil (Brazilian Portuguese pronunciation: [ˈkɔ.pɐ du bɾaˈziw], English: Brazil Cup) is a knockout football competition played by 126 clubs, representing all 26 Brazilian states and the Federal District. It is the Brazilian domestic cup and it is the Brazilian equivalent of the FA Cup, Taça de Portugal, Copa del Rey, Scottish Cup and Copa Argentina, even though it has much more prestige and is considered almost as important as the Campeonato Brasileiro, as the prize money is higher than the Brasileirão's. The winner of the cup automatically qualifies for the following edition of the Copa Libertadores, the most prestigious continental football tournament contested by top clubs in South America, organized by CONMEBOL.

Initially, the Copa do Brasil was contested by 32 clubs. The field increased to 40 in 1996, increased to 69 by the year of 2000, and stabilized at 64 after 2001, until 2012. Clubs from all 26 Brazilian states and the Federal District participate. From 2001 to 2012, the Copa do Brasil was played in the first half of the year and in those seasons, due to busy scheduling, teams playing in the Copa Libertadores did not participate in the Copa do Brasil during the same year. Thus, the Copa do Brasil champion never defended their title in the next edition, since they would be qualified for the Copa Libertadores that year. From 2013 to 2015, 87 clubs participate in the cup and the teams that compete in the Copa Libertadores join the Copa do Brasil directly in the Round of 16. Also, the best 8 from the previous year's Campeonato Brasileiro Série A eliminated up to the third round qualify for Copa Sudamericana.

Since the 2026 edition, the tournament has been and is thus known as the Copa do Brasil. Cruzeiro is the most successful club, having won the competition six times, followed by Flamengo and Grêmio with 5 titles, Corinthians and Palmeiras with 4, and Atlético Mineiro with 2. Another 11 clubs have won one edition of the competition, resulting in a total of 17 champions. The state with the highest number of titles is São Paulo, with 11. Only two states have champions from more than one city: São Paulo (Jundiaí, Santo André, Santos and São Paulo) and Rio Grande do Sul (Caxias do Sul and Porto Alegre). Rio de Janeiro (Flamengo, Fluminense and Vasco da Gama) and São Paulo (Palmeiras, Corinthians and São Paulo) are the only cities with more than two champion clubs.

== Format ==
The competition is a single elimination knockout tournament featuring two-legged ties (in the third round onwards). In the first two rounds, the winner is known after a single leg. The first round is played in the lowest ranked club's stadium, with the away club having a draw advantage to qualify.

Since the tournament's creation in 1989, the winner qualifies for the next year's Copa Libertadores de América.

=== Clubs ===
Round	Clubs remaining	Clubs involved	From previous round	Entries in this round	Clubs entering at this round
First round	80	80	80	none	* 70 best-placed state championships, cups and qualifiers teams (if not qualified for third round) (see below): 10 best-placed teams on the CBF ranking
Second round	40	40	40	none	
Third round	32	32	20	12	Non-random slots: Defending champions; Last year Série A champions; Last year Série A runners-up; Last year Série A 3rd place; Last year Série A 4th place; Last year Série A 5th place; Last year Série A 6th place; Last year Série B champions; Last year Copa do Nordeste champions; Last year Copa Verde champions; Random slots: Last year Brazilian Copa Libertadores champions; Last year Brazilian Copa Sudamericana champions; Last year Série A 7th place; Last year Série A 8th place; Last year Série A 9th place
Round of 16	16	16	16	none	
Quarter-finals	8	8	8	none	
Semi-finals	4	4	4	none	
Final	2	2	2	none	

=== State championships, cups and qualifiers ===
State	Clubs qualified	Clubs entering
(Acre (state)) Acre	2	Last year Campeonato Acreano champions; Last year Campeonato Acreano runners-up
Alagoas	3	Last year Campeonato Alagoano champions; Last year Campeonato Alagoano runners-up; Last year Campeonato Alagoano 3rd place
Amapá	2	Last year Campeonato Amapaense champions; Last year Campeonato Amapaense runners-up
(Amazonas (Brazilian state)) Amazonas	2	Last year Campeonato Amazonense champions; Last year Campeonato Amazonense runners-up
Bahia	3	Last year Campeonato Baiano champions; Last year Campeonato Baiano runners-up; Last year Campeonato Baiano 3rd place
Ceará	3	Last year Campeonato Cearense champions; Last year Campeonato Cearense runners-up; Last year Copa Fares Lopes champions
(Federal District (Brazil)) Distrito Federal	2	Last year Campeonato Brasiliense champions; Last year Campeonato Brasiliense runners-up
Espírito Santo	2	Last year Campeonato Capixaba champions; Last year Copa Espírito Santo champions
Goiás	3	Last year Campeonato Goiano champions; Last year Campeonato Goiano runners-up; Last year Campeonato Goiano 3rd place
Maranhão	3	Last year Campeonato Maranhense champions; Last year Campeonato Maranhense runners-up; Last year Campeonato Maranhense 3rd place
Mato Grosso	3	Last year Campeonato Mato-Grossense champions; Last year Campeonato Mato-Grossense runners-up; Last year Copa FMF champions
Mato Grosso do Sul	2	Last year Campeonato Sul-Mato-Grossense champions; Last year Campeonato Sul-Mato-Grossense runners-up
Minas Gerais	5	Last year Campeonato Mineiro champions; Last year Campeonato Mineiro runners-up; Last year Campeonato Mineiro 3rd place; Last year Campeonato Mineiro 4th place; Last year Troféu Inconfidência champions
Pará	3	Last year Campeonato Paraense champions; Last year Campeonato Paraense runners-up; Last year Campeonato Paraense 3rd place
Paraíba	2	Last year Campeonato Paraibano champions; Last year Campeonato Paraibano runners-up
(Paraná (state)) Paraná	5	Last year Campeonato Paranaense champions; Last year Campeonato Paranaense runners-up; Last year Campeonato Paranaense 3rd place; Last year Campeonato Paranaense 4th place; Last year Campeonato Paranaense 5th place
Pernambuco	3	Last year Campeonato Pernambucano champions; Last year Campeonato Pernambucano runners-up; Last year Campeonato Pernambucano 3rd place
Piauí	2	Last year Campeonato Piauiense champions; Last year Campeonato Piauiense runners-up
(Rio de Janeiro (state)) Rio de Janeiro	6	Non-random slots: Last year Campeonato Carioca champions; Last year Campeonato Carioca runners-up; Last year Campeonato Carioca 3rd place; Last year Campeonato Carioca 4th place; Last year Taça Rio champions; Random slots: Last year Copa Rio champions; Last year Copa Rio runners-up; The champion can choose to compete in the Copa do Brasil or Série D. The runner-up will take the remaining spot.)
Rio Grande do Norte	2	Last year Campeonato Potiguar champions; Last year Campeonato Potiguar runners-up
Rio Grande do Sul	5	Last year Campeonato Gaúcho champions; Last year Campeonato Gaúcho runners-up; Last year Campeonato Gaúcho 3rd place; Last year Campeonato Gaúcho 4th place; Last year Copa FGF champions
Rondônia	2	Last year Campeonato Rondoniense champions; Last year Campeonato Rondoniense runners-up
Roraima	2	Last year Campeonato Roraimense champions; Last year Campeonato Roraimense runners-up
(Santa Catarina (state)) Santa Catarina	3	Last year Campeonato Catarinense champions; Last year Campeonato Catarinense runners-up; Last year Copa Santa Catarina champions
(São Paulo (state)) São Paulo	6	Non-random slots: Last year Campeonato Paulista champions; Last year Campeonato Paulista runners-up; Last year Campeonato Paulista 3rd place; Last year Campeonato Paulista 4th place; Last year Taça Independência champions; Random slots: Last year Copa Paulista champions; Last year Copa Paulista runners-up; The champion can choose to compete in the Copa do Brasil or Série D. The runner-up will take the remaining spot.)
Sergipe	2	Last year Campeonato Sergipano champions; Last year Campeonato Sergipano runners-up
Tocantins	2	Last year Campeonato Tocantinense champions; Last year Campeonato Tocantinense runners-up

=== Eligible clubs ===
The eligible teams to compete in the Copa do Brasil are the previous year's Copa do Brasil champion, the 70 best-placed clubs in the state championships (in which the number of spots per state range from one to five clubs), the top six clubs from the previous year's Campeonato Brasileiro Série A, the Copa do Nordeste (Northeast Cup) champion, the Copa Verde (Green Cup) champion, the ten highest-ranked clubs in CBF's ranking not already qualified, and two of the following: the Brazilian champion of the most recent Copa Libertadores (if there is one), the Brazilian champion of the most recent Copa Sudamericana (if there is one), the 7th place club of Campeonato Brasileiro Série A, or the champion of Campeonato Brasileiro Série B.

The 7 Brazilians clubs in the Copa Libertadores da América, the best placed teams in the previous year's Série A and Série B (or the champion of Copa Libertadores and/or Copa Sudamericana, if it is a Brazilian team) and Copa do Nordeste and Copa Verde's Title Holders will join the Copa do Brasil directly in Round of 16.

== History ==
Winners Copa do Brasil
Season	Winners
1989	(Rio Grande do Sul) Grêmio
1990	(Rio de Janeiro (state)) Flamengo
1991	(Santa Catarina (state)) Criciúma
1992	(Rio Grande do Sul) Internacional
1993	(Minas Gerais) Cruzeiro
1994	(Rio Grande do Sul) Grêmio (2)
1995	(São Paulo (state)) Corinthians
1996	(Minas Gerais) Cruzeiro (2)
1997	(Rio Grande do Sul) Grêmio (3)
1998	(São Paulo (state)) Palmeiras
1999	(Rio Grande do Sul) Juventude
2000	(Minas Gerais) Cruzeiro (3)
2001	(Rio Grande do Sul) Grêmio (4)
2002	(São Paulo (state)) Corinthians (2)
2003	(Minas Gerais) Cruzeiro (4)
2004	(São Paulo (state)) Santo André
2005	(São Paulo (state)) Paulista
2006	(Rio de Janeiro (state)) Flamengo (2)
2007	(Rio de Janeiro (state)) Fluminense
2008	(Pernambuco) Sport Recife
2009	(São Paulo (state)) Corinthians (3)
2010	(São Paulo (state)) Santos
2011	(Rio de Janeiro (state)) Vasco da Gama
2012	(São Paulo (state)) Palmeiras (2)
2013	(Rio de Janeiro (state)) Flamengo (3)
2014	(Minas Gerais) Atlético Mineiro
2015	(São Paulo (state)) Palmeiras (3)
2016	(Rio Grande do Sul) Grêmio (5)
2017	(Minas Gerais) Cruzeiro (5)
2018	(Minas Gerais) Cruzeiro (6)
2019	(Paraná (state)) Athletico Paranaense
2020	(São Paulo (state)) Palmeiras (4)
2021	(Minas Gerais) Atlético Mineiro (2)
2022	(Rio de Janeiro (state)) Flamengo (4)
2023	(São Paulo (state)) São Paulo
2024	(Rio de Janeiro (state)) Flamengo (5)
2025	(São Paulo (state)) Corinthians (4)

The Copa do Brasil was created in 1989 to appease the state soccer federations with fewer large and traditional clubs on the national stage, whose representatives would hardly have the opportunity to face big clubs during the year. This concern arose after a decrease in the number of participants in the 1987 Campeonato Brasileiro, when 13 of the biggest clubs in Brazil broke away to form the Copa União (Union Cup) in response to the CBF's financial difficulties.

The creation of this competition was designed to promote the state championships in states with weaker teams, as a compensation for the reduction in the number of teams in the Campeonato Brasileiro Série A and the Campeonato Brasileiro Série B. The Copa do Brasil is of high importance for the medium and small clubs in these regions who now, at least theoretically, have a path to qualify for the Copa Libertadores.

The first edition of the Copa do Brasil took place in 1989. The first goal in the cup's history was scored by Alcindo Sartori in a 2–0 victory by Flamengo over Paysandu. Gremio were the first champion, qualifying to compete in the 1990 Copa Libertadores.

From 1989 to 1993, the champion of that year took home the trophy. In 1994 it was determined that the club that won the Copa do Brasil three times would have final possession of the cup. This happened in 2001 with Grêmio (after winning in 1994, 1997 and 2001).

Thus, for the 2002 Copa do Brasil a new trophy was contested, which remained until 2007 with no club earning its final possession.

By winning the 2003 Copa do Brasil and the 2003 Campeonato Brasileiro, Cruzeiro won both the domestic cup and domestic league in the same year, a feat that was matched only once in Brazilian football by Atlético Mineiro in 2021. Atlético has also won the 2021 Campeonato Mineiro, their state championship, as Cruzeiro did in 2003, completing the domestic treble (State league, national league and cup).

In 2008, a new trophy was instituted for the Copa do Brasil. In that same year Sport Recife became the first and so far only club from outside the Southeast Region or the South Region to win the competition. The North Region and Center-West regions have had no representative win the cup so far.

Grêmio's victory over Atletico Mineiro in the first leg of the 2016 Copa do Brasil final was the first time ever that a visiting club won the first leg of the Copa do Brasil final, in the 28 editions of the competition.

The number of participating teams has varied during the competition's history, based on the number of teams that qualify through their state federation's league tournament. From 1989 to 1994, 32 teams participated. That number was increased in 1995 to 36 teams, in 1996 to 40 teams, and in 1997 to 45 teams. 42 teams participated in 1998, 65 in 1999 and 69 in 2000.

From 2001 to 2012, the format was consolidated to 64 teams, without teams that participated in the Copa Libertadores that year due to conflict of dates.

In 2013, CBF presented a new cup trophy to replace the trophy in dispute since 2008. The champion gets permanent possession of the trophy and an identical trophy will be produced for the following year. Also in 2013, the tournament format was expanded again to 87 teams, which remained through 2014 and 2015. Under the new format, teams participating in Copa Libertadores again competed in the Copa do Brasil, entering the tournament directly into the Round of 16. In 2016 the number of participants was increased to 86, in 2017 to 91 and in 2021 to 92.

== Sponsorship ==
Years	Official sponsor	Name
2009–2012	Kia Motors	Copa Kia do Brasil
2013	Perdigão	Copa Perdigão do Brasil
2014–2015	Sadia	Copa Sadia do Brasil
2016–2020	Continental	Copa Continental do Brasil
2021–2022	Intelbras	Copa Intelbras do Brasil
2023–2026	Betano	Copa Betano do Brasil

== Records and statistics ==
=== Finalists ===
Club	Winners	Runners-up	Years won	Years runner-up
(Minas Gerais) Cruzeiro	6	2	1993, 1996, 2000, 2003, 2017, 2018	1998, 2014
(Rio de Janeiro (state)) Flamengo	5	5	1990, 2006, 2013, 2022, 2024	1997, 2003, 2004, 2017, 2023
(Rio Grande do Sul) Grêmio	5	4	1989, 1994, 1997, 2001, 2016	1991, 1993, 1995, 2020
(São Paulo (state)) Corinthians	4	4	1995, 2002, 2009, 2025	2001, 2008, 2018, 2022
(São Paulo (state)) Palmeiras	4	1	1998, 2012, 2015, 2020	1996
(Minas Gerais) Atlético Mineiro	2	2	2014, 2021	2016, 2024
(Rio Grande do Sul) Internacional	1	2	1992	2009, 2019
(Rio de Janeiro (state)) Fluminense	1	2	2007	1992, 2005
(Rio de Janeiro (state)) Vasco da Gama	1	2	2011	2006, 2025
(Paraná (state)) Athletico Paranaense	1	2	2019	2013, 2021
(Pernambuco) Sport	1	1	2008	1989
(São Paulo (state)) Santos	1	1	2010	2015
(São Paulo (state)) São Paulo	1	1	2023	2000
(Santa Catarina (state)) Criciúma	1	0	1991	—
(Rio Grande do Sul) Juventude	1	0	1999	—
(São Paulo (state)) Santo André	1	0	2004	—
(São Paulo (state)) Paulista	1	0	2005	—
(Paraná (state)) Coritiba	0	2	—	2011, 2012
Goiás	0	1	—	1990
Ceará	0	1	—	1994
(Rio de Janeiro (state)) Botafogo	0	1	—	1999
(Federal District (Brazil)) Brasiliense	0	1	—	2002
(Santa Catarina (state)) Figueirense	0	1	—	2007
(Bahia) Vitória	0	1	—	2010

=== Performance by State ===
State	Won	Runner-up
São Paulo	12	7
Minas Gerais	8	4
Rio de Janeiro	7	10
Rio Grande do Sul	7	6
Paraná	1	4
Pernambuco	1	1
Santa Catarina	1	1
Bahia	0	1
Ceará	0	1
Distrito Federal	0	1
Goiás	0	1

== See also ==
- Copa do Brasil de Futebol Feminino, the women's version of Copa do Brasil.
- History of football in Brazil
