= 1991 São Paulo FC season =

São Paulo
1991 season
- Chairman: José Eduardo Mesquita Pimenta
- Manager: Telê Santana
- Campeonato Brasileiro: Champions (3rd title) (in Copa Libertadores)
- Campeonato Paulista: Champions (17th title)
- Top goalscorer: League: Raí (7); All: Raí (28)
Home colours	Away colours

The 1991 season was São Paulo's 62nd season since club's existence.

== Statistics ==
=== Scorers ===
Position	Nation	Playing position	Name	Campeonato Brasileiro	Campeonato Paulista	Others	Total
1	(Brazil)	MF	Raí	7	19	2	28
2	(Brazil)	FW	Macedo	6	8	0	14
3	(Brazil)	FW	Müller	3	10	0	13
4	(Brazil)	MF	Baiano	0	5	2	7
5	(Brazil)	DF	Antônio Carlos	1	4	0	5
=	(Brazil)	MF	Elivélton	1	4	0	5
6	(Brazil)	DF	Cafu	1	3	0	4
=	(Brazil)	DF	Ronaldão	1	3	0	4
7	(Brazil)	FW	Eliel	2	0	0	2
=	(Brazil)	MF	Eraldo	0	2	0	2
=	(Brazil)	FW	Mário Tilico	2	0	0	2
=	(Brazil)	FW	Rinaldo	1	1	0	2
8	(Brazil)	FW	Anílton	0	1	0	1
=	(Brazil)	MF	Bernardo	1	0	0	1
=	(Brazil)	MF	Flávio	1	0	0	1
=	(Brazil)	DF	Ivan	0	0	1	1
=	(Brazil)	MF	Leonardo	1	0	0	1
=	(Brazil)	DF	Pavão	0	1	0	1
=	(Brazil)	MF	Sídnei	0	0	1	1
=	(Brazil)	MF	Suélio	0	1	0	1
=	(Brazil)	DF	Vítor	0	1	0	1
			Own goals	0	3	0	3
			Total	28	66	10	104

=== Transfers ===
In
Pos.	Name	from	Type
FW	Müller	Torino F.C.	
FW	Macedo	Rio Branco	
FW	Rinaldo	Fluminense	

Out
Pos.	Name	To	Type
FW	Diego Aguirre	Central Español	loan ended

==== July ====
In
Pos.	Name	from	Type

Out
Pos.	Name	To	Type
MF	Leonardo	Valencia CF	
DF	Ricardo Rocha	Real Madrid	
MF	Bernardo	Bayern München	
FW	Mário Tilico	Cruzeiro	loan

=== Overall ===
Games played	69 (23 Campeonato Brasileiro, 34 Campeonato Paulista, 12 Friendly match)
Games won	37 (12 Campeonato Brasileiro, 21 Campeonato Paulista, 4 Friendly match)
Games drawn	24 (7 Campeonato Brasileiro, 12 Campeonato Paulista, 5 Friendly match)
Games lost	8 (4 Campeonato Brasileiro, 1 Campeonato Paulista, 3 Friendly match)
Goals scored	109
Goals conceded	55
Goal difference	+54
Best result	5–0 (A) v Catanduvense - Campeonato Paulista - 1991.09.18; 5–0 (H) v São José - Campeonato Paulista - 1991.10.12
Worst result	1–4 (H) v Internacional - Campeonato Paulista - 1991.10.09
Top scorer	Raí (28)

Source: São Paulo FC

== Friendlies ==
January 27 National	Apucarana	0–1	São Paulo	Apucarana
				Stadium: Bom Jesus

January 29 National	Foz do Iguaçu	1–2	São Paulo	Foz do Iguaçu
				Stadium: Estádio do ABC

June 22 National	Rio Branco	2–2	São Paulo	Americana
				Stadium: Décio Vitta

July 2 International	China	1–2	(Brazil) São Paulo	Beijing
	Goal		Sídnei; Iván Rocha	Stadium: Workers Stadium

July 4 International	Beijing NT (China)	0–0	(Brazil) São Paulo	Beijing
				Stadium: Workers Stadium

July 7 International	Liaoning (China)	1–1	(Brazil) São Paulo	Shenyang
	Goal		Goal

July 10 International	Dalian Shide (China)	1–0	(Brazil) São Paulo	Dalian
	Goal

July 12 International	Guangzhou Baiyunshan (China)	2–1	(Brazil) São Paulo	Guangzhou
	Goal		Goal

July 14 International	Guangdong Hongyuan (China)	2–2	(Brazil) São Paulo	Guangzhou
	Goal		Goal

=== Troféo Naranja ===
August 21 International	Soviet Union	0–0	(Brazil) São Paulo	Valencia
				Stadium: Mestalla Stadium

August 22 International	Valencia (Spain)	1–0	(Brazil) São Paulo	Valencia
	Álvaro 77'			Stadium: Mestalla Stadium

=== Troféo Ciutat de Barcelona ===
August 24 International	Espanyol (Spain)	2–4	(Brazil) São Paulo	Barcelona
	Gabino; Zubillaga		Raí, Baiano,	Stadium: Estadi de Sarrià

== Official competitions ==
=== Campeonato Brasileiro ===
==== League table ====
First stage
Pos	Team	Pld	W	D	L	GF	GA	GD	Pts	Qualification or relegation
1	São Paulo	19	11	4	4	26	14	+12	26	Qualified to Semifinals
2	Bragantino	19	9	8	2	27	14	+13	26	Qualified to Semifinals
3	Fluminense	19	10	4	5	28	19	+9	24	Qualified to Semifinals
4	Atlético Mineiro	19	8	8	3	28	19	+9	24	Qualified to Semifinals
5	Corinthians	19	8	8	3	23	17	+6	24	

==== Matches ====
2 February 1991 1	Atlético Mineiro	0–3	São Paulo	Belo Horizonte
			Flavio 17'; Eliel 37', 80'	Stadium: Estádio Governador Magalhães Pinto (Mineirão); Attendance: 10,483; Referee: Dalmo Bozzano

6 February 1991 2	Flamengo	1–0	São Paulo	Rio de Janeiro
	Paulo César 16'			Stadium: Estádio da Gávea; Attendance: 3,929; Referee: José Roberto Wright

17 February 1991 3	São Paulo	1–2	Santos	São Paulo
	Raí 53'		Paulinho 59', 73'	Stadium: Estádio Cícero Pompeu de Toledo (Morumbi); Attendance: 8,863; Referee: Flávio de Carvalho

23 February 1991 4	São Paulo	1–0	Fluminense	São Paulo
	Rinaldo 24'			Stadium: Estádio Cícero Pompeu de Toledo (Morumbi); Attendance: 4,776; Referee: Márcio Rezende de Freitas

3 March 1991 5	São Paulo	2–1	Atlético Paranaense	São Paulo
	Cafu 48'; Raí 61'		Tico 85'	Stadium: Estádio Cícero Pompeu de Toledo (Morumbi); Attendance: 5,445; Referee: Manuel Serapião Filho

6 March 1991 6	Náutico	2–1	São Paulo	Recife
	Bizu 23'; Levi 76'		Raí 79'	Stadium: Estádio dos Aflitos; Attendance: 6,171; Referee: Wílson dos Santos

9 March 1991 7	São Paulo	1–0	Bahia	São Paulo
	Macedo 6'			Stadium: Estádio Cícero Pompeu de Toledo (Morumbi); Attendance: 5,620; Referee: José Mocelin

16 March 1991 8	Goiás	1–1	São Paulo	Goiânia
	Túlio 58'		Macedo 53'	Stadium: Estádio Serra Dourada; Attendance: 9,505; Referee: Dalmo Bozzano

22 March 1991 9	São Paulo	2–0	Grêmio	São Paulo
	Ronaldão 30'; Raí 69'			Stadium: Estádio Cícero Pompeu de Toledo (Morumbi); Attendance: 2,565; Referee: José Roberto Wright

31 March 1991 10	Bragantino	1–2	São Paulo	Bragança Paulista
	Alberto 59'	Report (pt)	Elivélton 52'; Macedo 78'	Stadium: Estádio Marcelo Stéfani; Attendance: 5,743; Referee: José Aparecido de Oliveira

4 April 1991 11	São Paulo	0–0	Palmeiras	São Paulo
		Report (pt)		Stadium: Estádio Cícero Pompeu de Toledo (Morumbi); Attendance: 23,658; Referee: Ilton José da Costa

7 April 1991 12	Corinthians	1–1	São Paulo	São Paulo
	Wilson Mano 14'	Report (pt)	Macedo 44'	Stadium: Estádio Cícero Pompeu de Toledo (Morumbi); Attendance: 43,429; Referee: Wilson Carlos dos Santos

14 April 1991 13	São Paulo	1–0	Portuguesa	São Paulo
	Müller 75'	Report (pt)		Stadium: Estádio Cícero Pompeu de Toledo (Morumbi); Attendance: 21,692; Referee: José Roberto Ramiz Wright

20 April 1991 14	Vasco da Gama	2–2	São Paulo	Rio de Janeiro
	Eduardo 28'; Sorato 78'	Report (pt)	Macedo 61', 80'	Stadium: Estádio Vasco da Gama (São Januário); Attendance: 9,075; Referee: José Mocellin

28 April 1991 15	São Paulo	2–0	Sport	São Paulo
	Müller 42'; Raí 55'	Report (pt)		Stadium: Estádio Cícero Pompeu de Toledo (Morumbi); Attendance: 18,285; Referee: Márcio Rezende de Freitas

1 May 1991 16	Vitória	1–2	São Paulo	Salvador
	Júnior Xavier 42'	Report (pt)	Raí 19'; Müller 79'	Stadium: Estádio Octávio Mangabeira (Fonte Nova); Attendance: 5,826; Referee: Renato Marsiglia

5 May 1991 17	São Paulo	1–0	Botafogo	São Paulo
	Bernardo 38'	Report (pt)		Stadium: Estádio Municipal Paulo Machado de Carvalho; Attendance: 33,552; Referee: Dalmo Bozzano

12 May 1991 18	São Paulo	3–1	Cruzeiro	São Paulo
	Raí 11'; Antônio Carlos 57'; Leonardo 69'	Report (pt)	Charles 15'	Stadium: Estádio Cícero Pompeu de Toledo (Morumbi); Attendance: 16,213; Referee: José Roberto Ramiz Wright

18 May 1991 19	Internacional	1–0	São Paulo	Porto Alegre
	Alex Rossi 78'	Report (pt)		Stadium: Estádio José Pinheiro Borda (Beira-Rio); Attendance: 2,860; Referee: Luís Carlos Abreu

===== Semifinals =====
25 May 1991 1	Atlético Mineiro	1–1	São Paulo	Belo Horizonte
	Cléber 61'	Report (pt)	Mário Tilico 26'	Stadium: Estádio Governador Magalhães Pinto (Mineirão); Attendance: 53,760; Referee: José Mocellin

2 June 1991 2	São Paulo	0–0	Atlético Mineiro	São Paulo
		Report (pt)		Stadium: Estádio Cícero Pompeu de Toledo (Morumbi); Attendance: 57,923; Referee: Joaquim Gregório dos Santos

===== Finals =====
5 June 1991 1	São Paulo	1–0	Bragantino	São Paulo
	Mário Tilico 49'	Report (pt)		Stadium: Estádio Cícero Pompeu de Toledo (Morumbi); Attendance: 67,759; Referee: Márcio Rezende de Freitas

9 June 1991 2	Bragantino	0–0 (0–1 agg.)	São Paulo	Bragança Paulista
		Report (pt)		Stadium: Estádio Marcelo Stéfani; Attendance: 12,492; Referee: José Roberto Wright

===== Final standings =====
Final standings
Pos	Team	Pld	W	D	L	GF	GA	GD	Pts	
1	São Paulo	23	12	7	4	28	15	+13	31	1992 Copa Libertadores
2	Bragantino	23	10	10	3	29	16	+13	30	
3	Atlético Mineiro	21	8	10	3	29	20	+9	26	
4	Fluminense	21	10	5	6	29	21	+8	25	
5	Corinthians	19	8	8	3	23	17	+6	24	

==== Record ====
Final Position	Points	Matches	Wins	Draws	Losses	Goals For	Goals Away	Win%
1st	31	23	12	7	4	28	14	67%

=== Campeonato Paulista ===
==== League table ====
First stage
Pos	Team	Pld	W	D	L	GF	GA	GD	Pts	Qualification or relegation
1	São Paulo	26	17	8	1	50	20	+30	42	Qualified
2	Inter de Limeira	26	16	2	8	37	22	+15	34	Qualified
3	Santo André	26	10	12	4	39	29	+10	32	Qualified
4	Noroeste	26	9	10	7	28	25	+3	28	1992 Group A
5	Sãocarlense	26	9	10	7	31	29	+2	28	1992 Group A

Updated to match(es) played on November 3, 1991. Source: RSSSF.com
Rules for classification: 1) points; 2) wins; 3) goal difference; 4) number of goals scored.

===== Matches =====
25 July 1991 1	Olímpia	1–1	São Paulo	Olímpia
	César Ferreira 42'		Elivélton 3'	Stadium: Estádio Municipal Maria Tereza Breda; Attendance: 6,079; Referee: Ilton José da Costa

28 July 1991 2	Juventus	0–4	São Paulo	São Paulo
			Müller 10', 77'; Vítor 38'; Rinaldo 87'	Stadium: Estádio Municipal Paulo Machado de Carvalho (Pacaembu); Attendance: 3,499; Referee: Flávio de Carvalho

1 August 1991 3	Santo André	3–3	São Paulo	Santo André
	Zeca 18'; Reginaldo 25'; Antônio Carlos 39' (o.g.)		Ronaldão 1', 9'; Cafu 90'	Stadium: Estádio Bruno José Daniel; Attendance: 3,271; Referee: Antônio de Pádua Sales

4 August 1991 4	São Paulo	1–0	Rio Branco	São Paulo
	Baiano 32'			Stadium: Estádio Cícero Pompeu de Toledo (Morumbi); Attendance: 4,329; Referee: Paulo Eduardo Pereira Barjas

6 August 1991 5	São Paulo	5–2	Marília	São Paulo
	Raí 1', 32'; Baiano 62', 85'; Cafu 67'		Zó 9'; Zé Rubens 30'	Stadium: Estádio Cícero Pompeu de Toledo (Morumbi); Attendance: 2,001; Referee: Válter Francisco dos Santos

10 August 1991 6	Sãocarlense	0–0	São Paulo	São Carlos
				Stadium: Estádio Luís Augusto de Oliveira; Attendance: 8,288; Referee: Márcio Rezende de Freitas

15 August 1991 7	São José	2–3	São Paulo	São José dos Campos
	Luciano 79'; Silvinho 90'		Baiano 27'; Bira 28' (o.g.); Anílton 89'	Stadium: Estádio Martins Pereira; Attendance: 4,772; Referee: José Roberto Ramiz Wright

17 August 1991 8	São Paulo	3–1	Noroeste	São Paulo
	Ronaldão 9'; Raí 58', 67'		Ronaldo Marques 19'	Stadium: Estádio Cícero Pompeu de Toledo (Morumbi); Attendance: 4,363; Referee: Wilson Carlos dos Santos

27 August 1991 9	São Paulo	1–0	União São João	São Paulo
	Müller 40'			Stadium: Estádio Municipal Paulo Machado de Carvalho (Pacaembu); Attendance: 5,444; Referee: Dagoberto Teixeira

29 August 1991 10	Ponte Preta	0–0	São Paulo	Campinas
				Stadium: Estádio Moisés Lucarelli; Attendance: 9,684; Referee: Paulo Eduardo Pereira Barjas

1 September 1991 11	São Paulo	2–1	São Bento	São Paulo
	Suélio 42'; Müller 82'		Ferreira 18'	Stadium: Estádio Municipal Paulo Machado de Carvalho (Pacaembu); Attendance: 3,307; Referee: Osvaldo dos Santos Ramos

4 September 1991 12	São Paulo	1–0	Catanduvense	São Paulo
	Müller 38'			Stadium: Estádio Cícero Pompeu de Toledo (Morumbi); Attendance: 3,999; Referee: Joaquim Carlos Caetano

8 September 1991 13	Internacional	0–1	São Paulo	Limeira
			Elivélton 29'	Stadium: Estádio Major José Levy Sobrinho; Attendance: 6,971; Referee: Oscar Roberto de Godói

15 September 1991 14	São Paulo	0–0	Santo André	São Paulo
				Stadium: Estádio Cícero Pompeu de Toledo (Morumbi); Attendance: 8,119; Referee: José Roberto Ramiz Wright

18 September 1991 15	Catanduvense	0–5	São Paulo	Catanduva
			Baiano 15'; Macedo 30'; Raí 33', 80'; Elivélton 64'	Stadium: Estádio Municipal Silvio Salles; Attendance: 4,626; Referee: Ulisses Tavares da Silva Filho

21 September 1991 16	São Paulo	2–0	Juventus	São Paulo
	Raí 28'; Macedo 83'			Stadium: Estádio do Canindé; Attendance: 8,730; Referee: João Paulo Araújo

28 September 1991 17	Rio Branco	0–1	São Paulo	Americana
			Macedo 70'	Stadium: Estádio Décio Vitta; Attendance: 9,686; Referee: Valter Francisco dos Santos

2 October 1991 18	São Paulo	2–1	Sãocarlense	São Paulo
	Antônio Carlos 30'; Macedo 43'		Edson Borges 71'	Stadium: Estádio Cícero Pompeu de Toledo (Morumbi); Attendance: 2,861; Referee: Antônio de Pádua Sales

6 October 1991 19	Marília	2–2	São Paulo	Marília
	Tosin 36'; Wanks 37'		Tosin 54' (o.g.); Antônio Carlos 87'	Stadium: Estádio Bento de Abreu; Attendance: 6,999; Referee: Flávio de Carvalho

9 October 1991 20	São Paulo	1–4	Internacional	São Paulo
	Pavão 44'		Cilinho 12', 13'; Guga 53'; Tato 68'	Stadium: Estádio Cícero Pompeu de Toledo (Morumbi); Attendance: 2,171; Referee: Marcos Fábio Spironelli

12 October 1991 21	São Paulo	5–0	São José	São Paulo
	Antônio Carlos 2'; Raí 5'; Barros 11' (o.g.); Eraldo 40'; Macedo 48'			Stadium: Estádio Cícero Pompeu de Toledo (Morumbi); Attendance: 4,976; Referee: Joaquim Carlos Caetano

17 October 1991 22	Noroeste	1–1	São Paulo	Bauru
	Marco Aurélio 71'		Macedo 24'	Stadium: Estádio Alfredo de Castilho; Attendance: 7,698; Referee: Oscar Roberto de Godói

20 October 1991 23	São Bento	0–0	São Paulo	Sorocaba
				Stadium: Estádio Municipal Walter Ribeiro; Attendance: 6,423; Referee: Mário Eugênio Bismarck

23 October 1991 24	São Paulo	3–1	Ponte Preta	São Paulo
	Raí 35', 84'; Eraldo 44'		Ernani 56'	Stadium: Estádio Cícero Pompeu de Toledo (Morumbi); Attendance: 2,873; Referee: Ulisses Tavares da Silva Filho

27 October 1991 25	São Paulo	1–0	Olímpia	São Paulo
	Raí 90'			Stadium: Estádio Cícero Pompeu de Toledo (Morumbi); Attendance: 4,692; Referee: Sergio Correia da Silva

2 November 1991 26	União São João	1–2	São Paulo	Araras
	Giba 41'		Antônio Carlos 22'; Raí 89'	Stadium: Estádio Hermínio Ometto; Attendance: 3,128; Referee: Oswaldo dos Santos Ramos

==== Second stage ====
Group 2
Pos	Team	Pld	W	D	L	GF	GA	GD	Pts	Qualification or relegation
1	São Paulo	6	3	3	0	13	7	+6	9	Qualified
2	Palmeiras	6	4	1	1	11	5	+6	9	
3	Guarani	6	2	1	3	8	11	−3	5	
4	Botafogo	6	0	1	5	4	13	−9	1	

Updated to match(es) played on December 1, 1991. Source: RSSSF.com
Rules for classification: 1) points; 2) best season record; 3) wins; 4) goal difference.

===== Matches =====
10 November 1991 1	Palmeiras	2–4	São Paulo	São Paulo
	Márcio 12'; César Sampaio 36'		Macedo 9', 34'; Müller 70'; Raí 87'	Stadium: Estádio Cícero Pompeu de Toledo (Morumbi); Attendance: 60,156; Referee: José Roberto Ramiz Wright

13 November 1991 2	São Paulo	2–1	Botafogo-SP	São Paulo
	Müller 51', 79'		Vidotti 46'	Stadium: Estádio Cícero Pompeu de Toledo (Morumbi); Attendance: 20,793; Referee: Oswaldo dos Santos Ramos

17 November 1991 3	Guarani	2–2	São Paulo	Campinas
	Nelsinho 8' (o.g.); Cacaio 53'		Raí 34'; Cafu 86'	Stadium: Estádio Brinco de Ouro; Attendance: 19,652; Referee: José Aparecido de Oliveira

21 November 1991 4	Botafogo-SP	1–1	São Paulo	Ribeirão Preto
	Antônio Carlos 26' (o.g.)		Elivélton 21'	Stadium: Estádio Santa Cruz; Attendance: 15,003; Referee: Oscar Roberto de Godói

24 November 1991 5	São Paulo	4–1	Guarani	São Paulo
	Raí 18', 76'; Müller 60', 85'		Vônei 51'	Stadium: Estádio Cícero Pompeu de Toledo (Morumbi); Attendance: 34,533; Referee: Valter Francisco dos Santos

1 December 1991 6	São Paulo	0–0	Palmeiras	São Paulo
				Stadium: Estádio Cícero Pompeu de Toledo (Morumbi); Attendance: 110,915; Referee: José Roberto Wright

==== Finals ====
December 8 Finals	Corinthians	0–3	São Paulo	São Paulo
			Raí 16', 59', 62'	Stadium: Estádio Cícero Pompeu de Toledo (Morumbi); Attendance: 102,821; Referee: Oscar Roberto de Godói

December 15 Finals	São Paulo	0–0 (3–0 agg.)	Corinthians	São Paulo
				Stadium: Estádio Cícero Pompeu de Toledo (Morumbi); Attendance: 106,142; Referee: Ílton José da Costa

==== Record ====
Final Position	Points	Matches	Wins	Draws	Losses	Goals For	Goals Away	Win%
1st	54	34	21	12	1	66	27	79%
