= 1994 Copa CONMEBOL finals =

- Event: 1994 Copa CONMEBOL
São Paulo	Peñarol
(Brazil)	(Uruguay)
6	4
- (on aggregate)

First leg
São Paulo	Peñarol
6	1
- Date: 14 December 1994
- Venue: Estádio do Morumbi, São Paulo
- Referee: Iván Guerrero (Chile)
- Attendance: 7,000

Second leg
Peñarol	São Paulo
3	0
- Date: 21 December 1994
- Venue: Estadio Centenario, Montevideo
- Referee: Javier Castrilli (Argentina)

The 1994 Copa CONMEBOL finals were the two-legged series that decided the winner of 1994 Copa CONMEBOL, the 3rd. edition of this international competition. The finals were contested by Brazilian club São Paulo and Uruguayan club Peñarol.

The first leg was held in Estádio do Morumbi in the city of São Paulo, where the local team easily defeated Peñarol 6–1. In the second leg, held in Estadio Centenario in Montevideo, Peñarol beat São Paulo 3–0. As a result, both teams were tied on points, but São Paulo won 6–4 on aggregate score to claim their first title in the competition.

== Qualified teams ==
Team	Previous final app.
(Brazil) São Paulo	(None)
(Uruguay) Peñarol	1993

== Venues ==
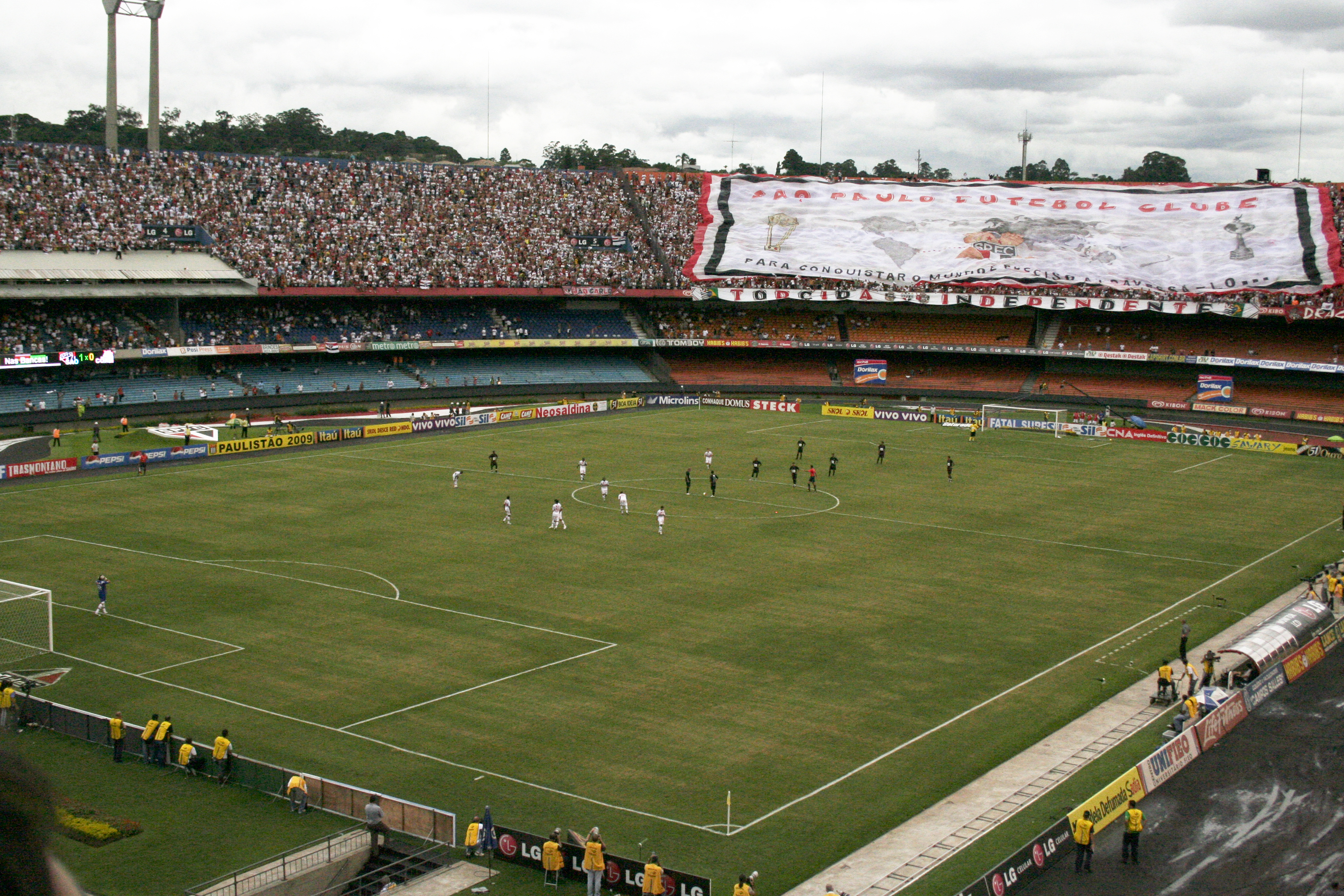
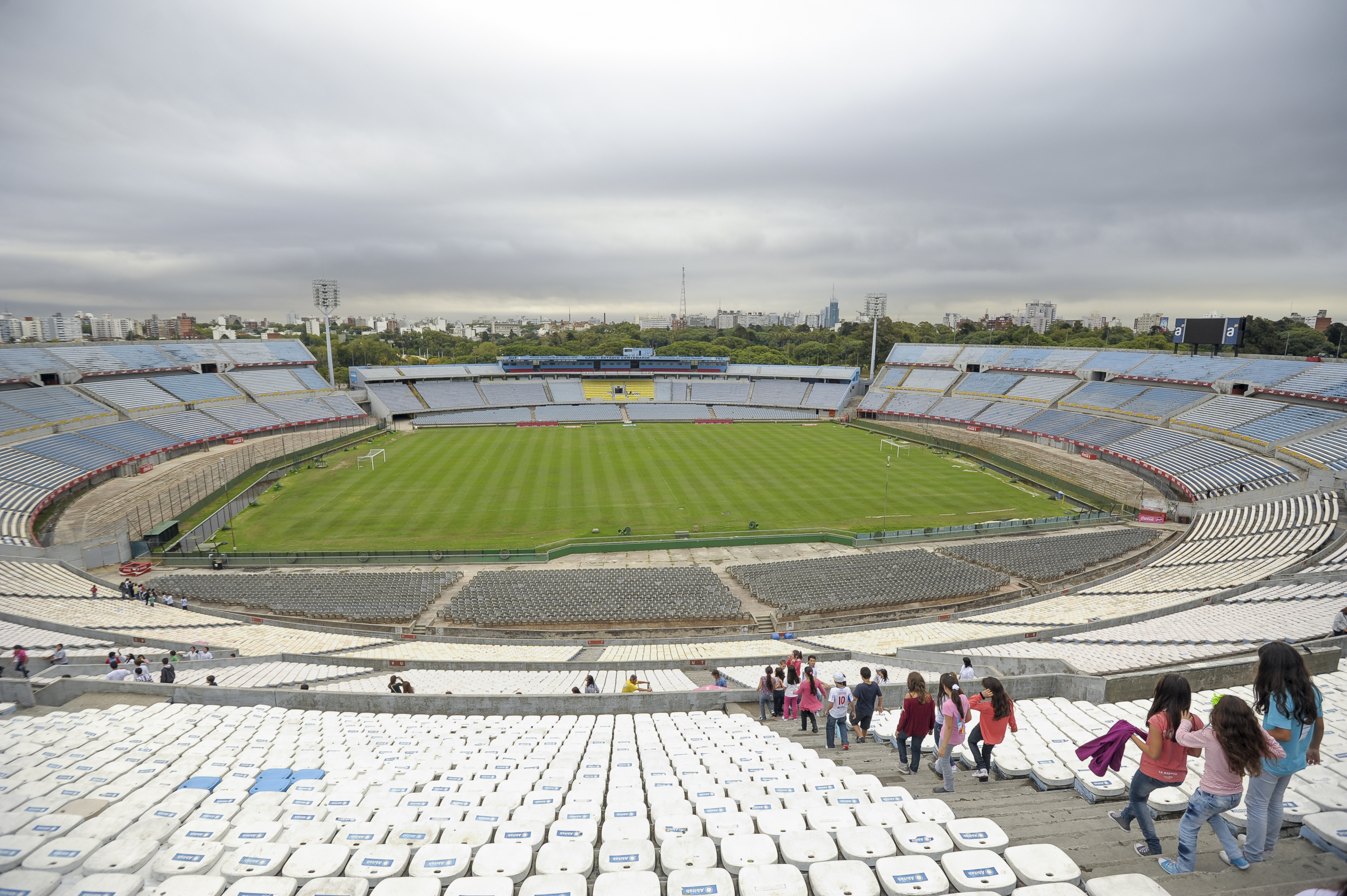
Estadio do Morumbi (left) and Estadio Centenario, venues for the series

== Route to the final ==
Note: In all scores below, the score of the home team is given first.

(Brazil) São Paulo			Round	(Uruguay) Peñarol		
Opponent	Venue	Score		Opponent	Venue	Score
(Brazil) Grêmio (tied 0–0 on aggregate, won on penalties)	Away	0–0	First round	(Uruguay) Danubio (won 2–1 on aggregate)	Home	2–0
(Brazil) Grêmio (tied 0–0 on aggregate, won on penalties)	Home	0–0 (6–5 p)	First round	(Uruguay) Danubio (won 2–1 on aggregate)	Away	1–0
(Peru) Sporting Cristal (won 3–1 on aggregate)	Home	3–1	Quarter-finals	(Paraguay) Cerro Corá (won 7–4 on aggregate)	Away	3–1
(Peru) Sporting Cristal (won 3–1 on aggregate)	Away	0–0	Quarter-finals	(Paraguay) Cerro Corá (won 7–4 on aggregate)	Home	6–1
(Brazil) Corinthians (tied 6–6 on aggregate, won on penalties)	Away	3–4	Semi-finals	Universidad de Chile (won 3–1 on aggregate)	Home	2–0
(Brazil) Corinthians (tied 6–6 on aggregate, won on penalties)	Home	2–3 (5–4 p)	Semi-finals	Universidad de Chile (won 3–1 on aggregate)	Away	1–1

== Match details ==
=== First leg ===
1994 Copa CONMEBOL Finals
December 15, 1994
First leg

São Paulo (Brazil)	6–1	(Uruguay) Peñarol
Caio 41', 75'; Catê 57', 83', 89'; Toninho 71'		Aguilera 4'

Estádio do Morumbi, São Paulo
Attendance: 7,000
Referee: Iván Guerrero (Chile)

São Paulo	Peñarol

GK	1	(Brazil) Rogério Ceni
DF	2	(Brazil) Pavão
DF	3	(Brazil) Nelson
DF	15	(Brazil) Marcelo Bordon
DF	6	(Brazil) Ronaldo Luiz
MF	17	(Brazil) Mona
MF	8	(Brazil) Emerson Pereira
MF	24	(Brazil) Denílson
FW	7	(Brazil) Catê
FW	9	(Brazil) Caio
FW	11	(Brazil) Toninho
Manager:
(Brazil) Muricy Ramalho

GK	1	(Uruguay) Óscar Ferro
DF	2	(Uruguay) Washington Tais
DF	4	(Uruguay) Óscar Aguirregaray	Substituted off
DF	3	(Uruguay) Enrique de los Santos
DF	5	(Uruguay) Robert Lima
MF	14	(Uruguay) Nelson Gutiérrez
MF	7	(Uruguay) Diego Dorta
MF	17	(Uruguay) Danilo Baltierra
MF	10	(Uruguay) Pablo Bengoechea	Substituted off
FW	11	(Uruguay) Carlos Aguilera
FW	9	(Uruguay) Darío Silva
Substitutes:
MF	6	(Uruguay) Andrés Martínez	Substituted on
FW	8	(Uruguay) Marcelo Otero	Substituted on
Manager:
(Uruguay) Gregorio Pérez

=== Second leg ===
December 21, 1994
Second leg

Peñarol (Uruguay)	3–0	(Brazil) São Paulo
Dorta; Silva; Rodríguez

Estadio Centenario, Montevideo
Referee: Javier Castrilli (Argentina)

Peñarol
São Paulo

GK	1	(Uruguay) Óscar Ferro
DF	2	(Uruguay) Washington Tais
DF	3	(Uruguay) Enrique de los Santos
DF	4	(Uruguay) Óscar Aguirregaray
DF	16	(Uruguay) Luis Romero
MF	7	(Uruguay) Diego Dorta
MF	19	(Uruguay) Martín Rodríguez
MF	10	(Uruguay) Pablo Bengoechea	Substituted off
MF	18	(Uruguay) Antonio Pacheco
FW	8	(Uruguay) Marcelo Otero	Substituted off
FW	9	(Uruguay) Darío Silva
Substitutes:
MF	6	(Uruguay) Andrés Martínez	Substituted on
FW	11	(Uruguay) Carlos Aguilera	Substituted on
Manager:
(Uruguay) Gregorio Pérez

GK	1	(Brazil) Rogério Ceni
DF	5	(Brazil) Vítor
DF	3	(Brazil) Nelson
DF	15	(Brazil) Marcelo Bordon
DF	6	(Brazil) Ronaldo Luiz
MF	17	(Brazil) Mona
MF	2	(Brazil) Pavão
MF	8	(Brazil) Emerson Pereira
FW	24	(Brazil) Denílson	Substituted off
FW	9	(Brazil) Caio
FW	10	(Brazil) Juninho Paulista	Substituted off
Substitutes:
MF	4	(Brazil) Murilo	Substituted on
MF	18	(Brazil) Danilo Machado	Substituted on
Manager:
(Brazil) Muricy Ramalho
