= 1993 Copa CONMEBOL finals =

- Event: 1993 Copa CONMEBOL
Peñarol	Botafogo
(Uruguay)	(Brazil)
3	3
- (Botafogo won 3–1 on penalties)

First leg
Peñarol	Botafogo
1	1
- Date: 22 September 1993
- Venue: Estadio Centenario, Montevideo
- Referee: Juan Escobar (Paraguay)
- Attendance: 20,000

Second leg
Botafogo	Peñarol
2	2
- Date: 29 September 1993
- Venue: Maracanã Stadium, Rio de Janeiro
- Referee: Francisco Lamolina (Argentina)
- Attendance: 45,000

The 1993 Copa CONMEBOL finals were the two-legged series that decided the winner of 1993 Copa CONMEBOL, the 2nd. edition of this international competition. The finals were contested by Brazilian club Botafogo and Uruguayan club Peñarol.

The first leg was held in Estadio Centenario in Montevideo, where both teams tied 1–1, while the second leg was held in Maracanã Stadium, in Rio de Janeiro with another tie (2–2) registered. As both teams were tied on points and goal difference, a Penalty shoot-out was carried out to decide the series. Botafogo won on penalties 3–1 to claim their first title in the competition.

== Qualified teams ==
Team	Previous final app.
(Brazil) Botafogo	(None)
(Uruguay) Peñarol	(None)

== Venues ==
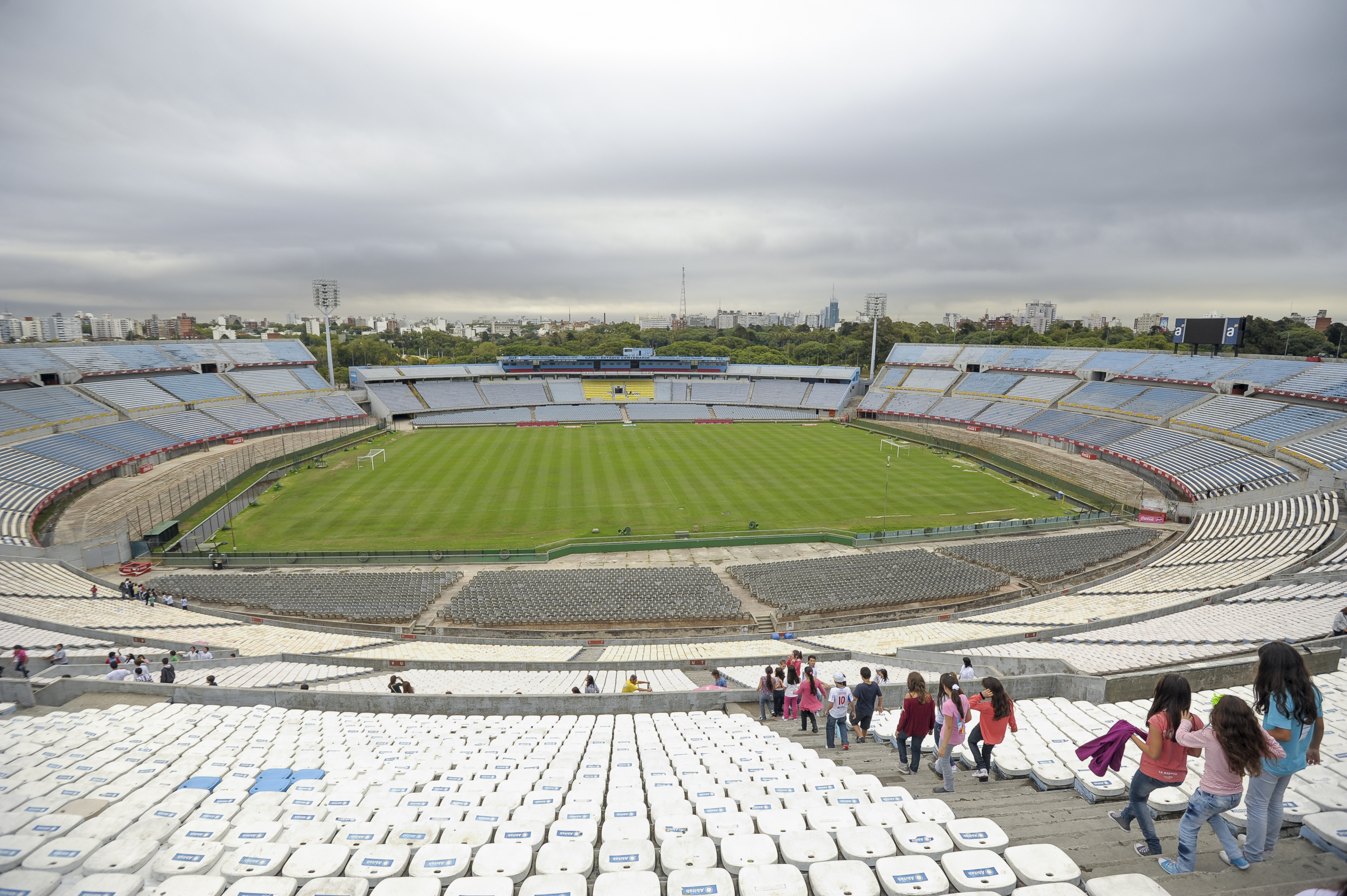
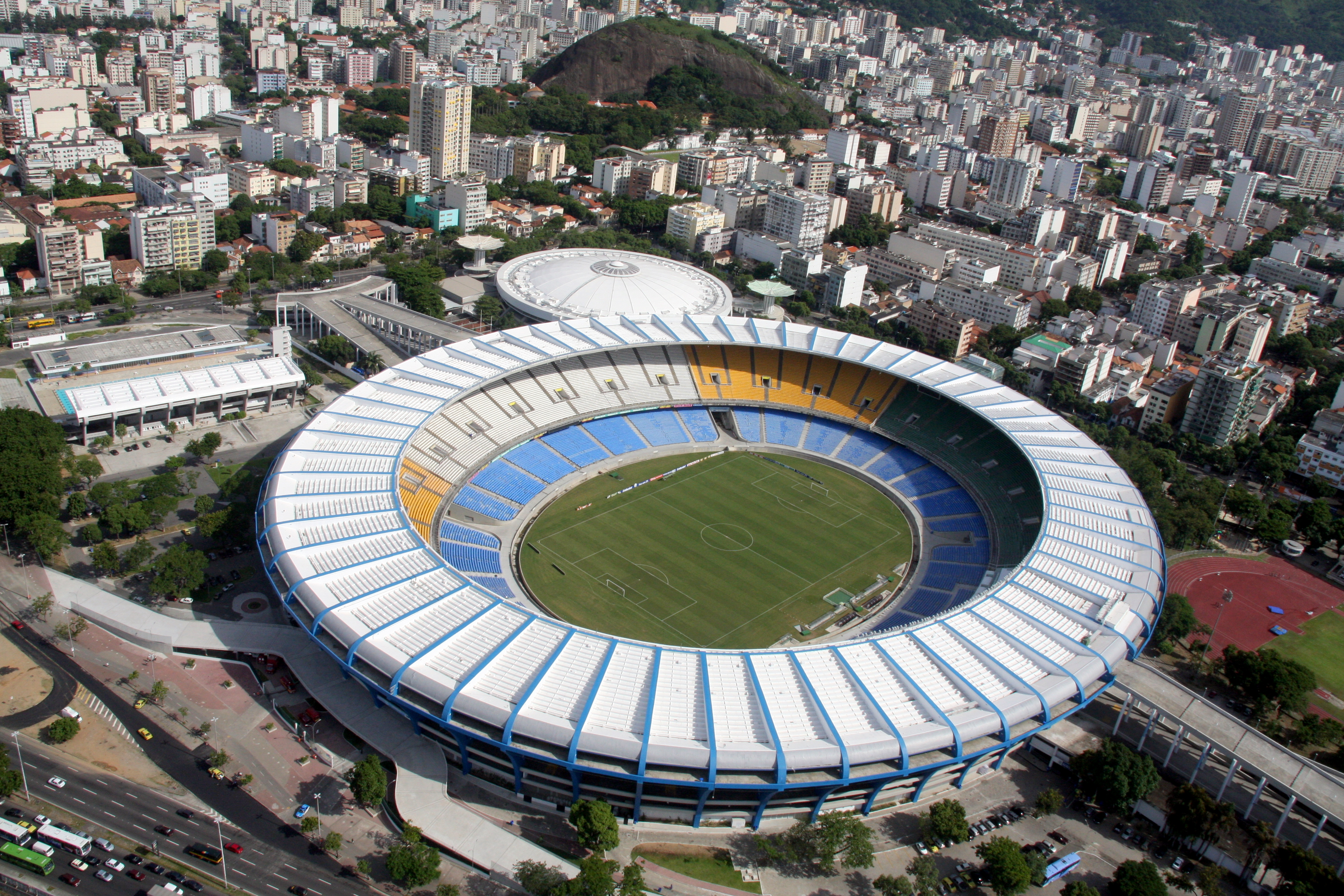
Estadio Centenario (left) and Maracaná, venues for the series

== Route to the final ==
Note: In all scores below, the score of the home team is given first.

(Brazil) Botafogo			Round	(Uruguay) Peñarol		
Opponent	Venue	Score		Opponent	Venue	Score
(Brazil) Bragantino (won 6–3 on aggregate)	Home	3–1	First round	(Argentina) Huracán (won 2–1 on aggregate)	Home	1–0
(Brazil) Bragantino (won 6–3 on aggregate)	Away	2–3	First round	(Argentina) Huracán (won 2–1 on aggregate)	Away	1–1
(Venezuela) Caracas (won 4–0 on aggregate)	Away	0–1	Quarter-finals	(Chile) Colo-Colo (tied 2–2 on aggregate, won on penalties)	Home	2–0
(Venezuela) Caracas (won 4–0 on aggregate)	Home	3–0	Quarter-finals	(Chile) Colo-Colo (tied 2–2 on aggregate, won on penalties)	Away	2–0 (2–4 p)
(Brazil) Atlético Mineiro (won 4–3 on aggregate)	Away	3–1	Semi-finals	(Argentina) San Lorenzo (tied 2–2 on aggregate, won on penalties)	Home	0–1
(Brazil) Atlético Mineiro (won 4–3 on aggregate)	Home	2–0	Semi-finals	(Argentina) San Lorenzo (tied 2–2 on aggregate, won on penalties)	Away	1–2 (4–2 p)

== Match details ==
=== First leg ===
1993 Copa CONMEBOL Finals
22 September 1993
First leg

Peñarol (Uruguay)	1–1	(Brazil) Botafogo
Otero 36'		Perivaldo 4'

Estadio Centenario, Montevideo
Attendance: 20,000
Referee: Juan F. Escobar (Paraguay)

Peñarol	Botafogo

GK	21	(Uruguay) Gerardo Rabajda
DF	22	(Uruguay) Washington Tais
DF	3	(Uruguay) Nelson Gutiérrez
DF	23	(Uruguay) Enrique de los Santos
DF	5	(Uruguay) Gustavo da Silva
MF	25	(Uruguay) José Perdomo	Substituted off
MF	30	(Uruguay) Danilo Baltierra
MF	26	(Uruguay) Pablo Bengoechea	Substituted off
MF	7	(Uruguay) Gustavo Rehermann
FW	28	(Uruguay) Marcelo Otero
FW	29	(Uruguay) Martín Rodríguez
Substitutes:
DF		(Uruguay) Augusto Consani	Substituted on
FW	10	(Uruguay) Gustavo Ferreyra	Substituted on
Manager:
(Uruguay) Gregorio Pérez

GK	12	(Brazil) William Bacana
DF	10	(Brazil) Perivaldo
DF	3	(Brazil) André
DF		(Brazil) Rogério Pinheiro
DF	23	(Brazil) Clei
MF		(Brazil) China
MF		(Brazil) Fabiano
MF	2	(Brazil) Eliomar
MF	14	(Brazil) Aléssio	(substituted on) a'
FW	9	(Brazil) Sinval
FW	18	(Brazil) Eliel
Substitutes:
FW	20	(Brazil) Marcos	(substituted on) a'
Manager:
(Brazil) Carlos Alberto Torres

=== Second leg ===
29 September 1993
Second leg

Botafogo (Brazil)	2–2	(Uruguay) Peñarol
Eliel 52'; Sinval 67'		Perdomo 35'; Otero 90'
Penalties
Sinval (penalty missed); Suélio (penalty scored); Perivaldo (penalty scored); André (penalty scored)	3–1	(penalty missed) Ferreyra; (penalty scored) da Silva; (penalty missed) Gutiérrez; (penalty missed) de los Santos

Maracanã Stadium, Rio de Janeiro
Attendance: 45,000
Referee: Francisco Lamolina (Argentina)

Botafogo
Peñarol

GK	12	(Brazil) William Bacana
DF	10	(Brazil) Perivaldo
DF	3	(Brazil) André
DF	29	(Brazil) Claudio
DF	23	(Brazil) Clei	Substituted off
MF	5	(Brazil) Nélson
MF	8	(Brazil) Suélio
MF	14	(Brazil) Aléssio	Substituted off
MF	7	(Brazil) Marcelo Carioca
FW	9	(Brazil) Sinval
FW	18	(Brazil) Eliel
Substitutes:
MF	2	(Brazil) Eliomar	Substituted on
FW	20	(Brazil) Marcos	Substituted on
Manager:
(Brazil) Carlos Alberto Torres

GK	21	(Uruguay) Gerardo Rabajda
DF	22	(Uruguay) Washington Tais
DF	3	(Uruguay) Nelson Gutiérrez
DF	23	(Uruguay) Enrique de los Santos
DF	5	(Uruguay) Gustavo da Silva
MF	27	(Uruguay) Diego Dorta
MF	25	(Uruguay) José Perdomo	Substituted off
MF	30	(Uruguay) Danilo Baltierra
MF	26	(Uruguay) Pablo Bengoechea	Substituted off
FW	28	(Uruguay) Marcelo Otero
FW	29	(Uruguay) Martín Rodríguez
Substitutes:
MF	7	(Uruguay) Gustavo Rehermann	Substituted on
FW	10	(Uruguay) Gustavo Ferreyra	Substituted on
Manager:
(Uruguay) Gregorio Pérez
