= Natan Masiero =

Brazilian footballer

Personal information
- Date of birth: 27 November 2001 (age 24)
- Place of birth: Francisco Beltrão, Brazil
- Height: 1.82 m (6 ft 0 in)
- Position: Right-back

Team information
- Current team: São José-SP
- Number: 27

Youth career
- 2017: União Beltrão
- 2018: Concórdia
- 2019–2020: Atlético Tubarão
- 2020–2021: Ceará

Senior career*
Years	Team	Apps	(Gls)
2020	Atlético Tubarão	6	(0)
2021–2022	Ceará	3	(0)
2022	→ Figueirense (loan)	22	(1)
2023–2024	Floresta	14	(1)
2025	União Beltrão	8	(0)
2026	Santa Cruz de Natal	7	(1)
2026	São Bento	6	(0)
2026	Treze	15	(0)
2026–	São José-SP	0	(0)
- * Club domestic league appearances and goals as of 00:04, 18 August 2026 (UTC)

Natan Masiero (born 27 November 2001), sometimes known as just Natan, is a Brazilian professional footballer who plays as a right-back for São José-SP.

== Career ==
Born in Francisco Beltrão, Paraná, Natan began his career with hometown side União Beltrão, and represented Concórdia and Atlético Tubarão as a youth before making his senior debut with the latter club in 2020. In October of that year, he moved to Ceará on a two-year deal, and returned to the youth setup.

After appearing with the main squad of the Vozão in the 2021 Campeonato Cearense, Natan mainly played for the under-20 team in the remainder of the year, and was loaned to Figueirense on 9 December. On 13 January 2023, he signed a permanent deal with Floresta.

In September 2025, Natan was announced back at his first club União, before being announced at Santa Cruz de Natal for the upcoming season on 20 November. On 18 March 2026, after a short period at São Bento, he agreed to a deal with Treze.

On 6 August 2026, São José-SP announced the signing of Natan for the Copa Paulista, as a replacement to injured Igor Dutra.

== Career statistics ==
As of 17 August 2026

Club	Season	League			State League		Cup		Continental		Other		Total	
Club	Season	Division	Apps	Goals	Apps	Goals	Apps	Goals	Apps	Goals	Apps	Goals	Apps	Goals
Atlético Tubarão	2020	Série D	—		6	0	—		—		—		6	0
Ceará	2021	Série A	0	0	3	0	0	0	—		1 (Note: Appearance(s) in Copa Fares Lopes)	0	4	0
Figueirense	2022	Série C	11	0	11	1	2	0	—		13 (Note: One appearance in Recopa Catarinense, twelve appearances in Copa Santa Catarina)	0	37	1
Floresta	2023	Série C	0	0	11	1	—		—		—		11	1
Floresta	2024	Série C	0	0	3	0	—		—		—		3	0
Floresta	Total		0	0	14	1	—		—		—		14	1
União Beltrão	2025	Paranaense 3ª Divisão	—		8	0	—		—		—		8	0
Santa Cruz de Natal	2026	Potiguar	—		7	1	—		—		—		7	1
São Bento	2026	Paulista A2	—		6	0	—		—		—		6	0
Treze	2026	Série D	15	0	—		—		—		—		15	0
São José-SP	2026	Paulista A2	—		—		—		—		1 (Note: Appearance(s) in Copa Paulista)	0	1	0
Career total			26	0	55	3	2	0	0	0	15	0	98	3
