= João Paulo (footballer, born February 1985) =

Brazilian footballer

Personal information
- Full name: João Paulo da Silva
- Date of birth: 22 February 1985 (age 41)
- Place of birth: Francisco Beltrão, Paraná
- Height: 1.78 m (5 ft 10 in)
- Position: Defensive midfielder

Team information
- Current team: Ypiranga
- Number: 30

Youth career
- 1995–2001: Francisco Beltrão-PR

Senior career*
Years	Team	Apps	(Gls)
2002–2005	Francisco Beltrão-PR	9	(1)
2006	São Caetano	11	(2)
2006	→ São José (loan)	4	(0)
2007	Londrina	3	(1)
2008	→ União Barbarense (loan)	3	(0)
2008	→ América (loan)	12	(1)
2009	→ Iraty (loan)	14	(0)
2009	Paraná	29	(2)
2009	Avaí	0	(0)
2010	→ Paraná (loan)	10	(2)
2010–2011	Albirex Niigata	8	(0)
2011–2012	Ponte Preta	41	(3)
2012–2014	Atlético Paranaense	73	(5)
2015–2018	Coritiba	71	(3)
2018	Londrina	24	(0)
2019	São Bento	8	(0)
2019–2021	Juventude	93	(5)
2021	Figueirense	8	(0)
2021–	Londrina	22	(3)
- * Club domestic league appearances and goals as of 23:36, 16 June 2019 (UTC)

João Paulo da Silva (born 22 February 1985), known as João Paulo is a Brazilian footballer who plays for Ypiranga as a defensive midfielder.

== Club career ==
Born in Francisco Beltrão, Paraná, João Paulo graduated from São Caetano's youth setup. A versatile two-footed central midfielder, he signed with the Japanese club Albirex Niigata in August 2010.

After an unsuccessful stint in Japan, João Paulo returned to Brazil and signed for Ponte Preta in March 2011. After appearing regularly for Macaca he moved to Atlético Paranaense on 6 July 2012.

== Club statistics ==
As of 13 October 2014

Club	Season	League		Cup		Other		Total	
Club	Season	Apps	Goals	Apps	Goals	Apps	Goals	Apps	Goals
Paraná	2009	29	2	0	0	-		29	2
Paraná	2010	10	2	4	0	-		14	2
Paraná	Total	39	4	4	0	-		43	4
Albirex Niigata	2010	8	0	1	0	0	0	9	0
Albirex Niigata	2011	0	0	0	0	0	0	0	0
Albirex Niigata	Total	8	0	0	0	1	0	9	0
Ponte Preta	2011	34	3	0	0	-		34	3
Ponte Preta	2012	7	0	4	0	20	2	31	2
Ponte Preta	Total	41	3	4	0	20	2	65	5
Atlético Paranaense	2012	27	4	0	0	-		27	4
Atlético Paranaense	2013	31	1	10	0	-		41	1
Atlético Paranaense	2014	15	0	2	0	7	0	24	0
Atlético Paranaense	Total	73	5	12	0	7	0	92	5
