= Estádio Anilado =

Football stadium in Francisco Beltrão, Paraná, Brazil

Coordinates: 26°04′58″S 53°03′33″W

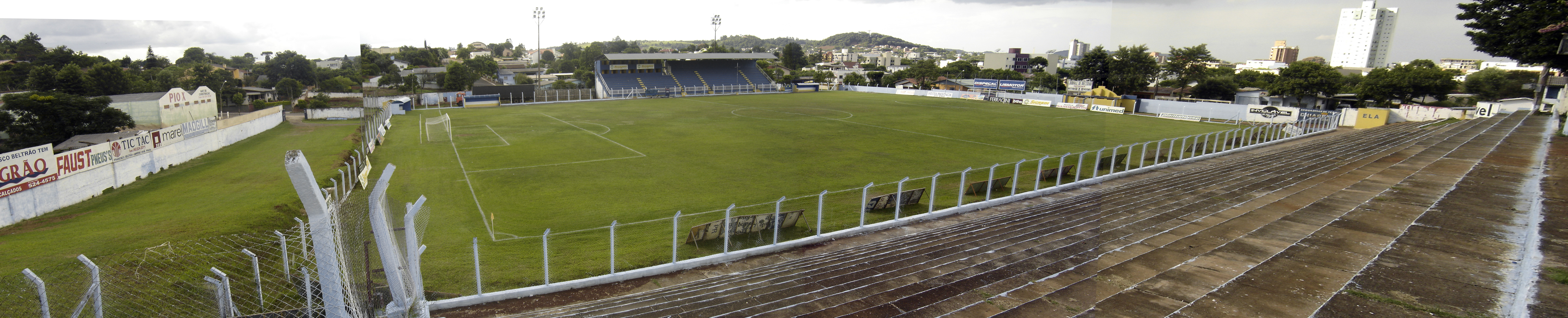
Estádio Anilado.

Estádio Anilado, usually known simply as Anilado is a football stadium located in Nossa Senhora Aparecida neighborhood, Francisco Beltrão, Paraná state, Brazil. The stadium has a maximum capacity of 7,000 people.

Estádio Anilado is owned by Clube Esportivo União, but from 2005 to 2008 it is being administered by the Francisco Beltrão City Hall. The stadium is the home ground of Francisco Beltrão Futebol Clube. Its name means indigo in Portuguese language.

== History ==
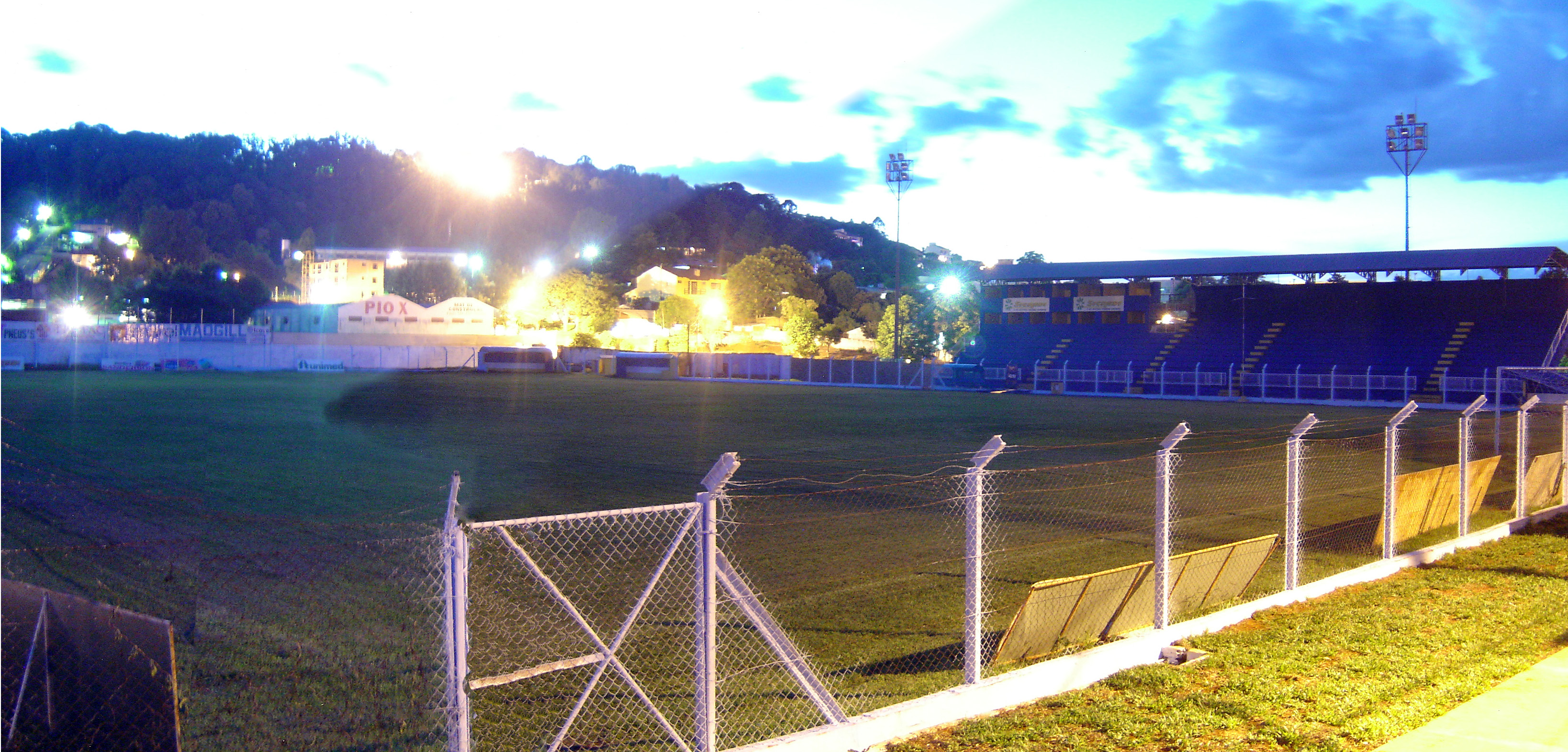
Estádio Anilado.

In 1993, the works on Estádio Anilado were completed. The inaugural match was played on February 7 of that year, when Francisco Beltrão and Goioerê drew 1-1.

The stadium's attendance record currently stands at 6,366, set on February 28, 1993, when Francisco Beltrão and Coritiba drew 1-1.
