= Wellisson =

Brazilian footballer

Personal information
- Full name: Wellisson Almeida Nunes
- Date of birth: 9 July 1996 (age 30)
- Place of birth: Palotina, Brazil
- Height: 1.86 m (6 ft 1 in)
- Position: Forward

Team information
- Current team: Blumenau

Youth career
- 2015: Londrina

Senior career*
Years	Team	Apps	(Gls)
2016–2020	Londrina	25	(4)
2018	→ União Beltrão (loan)	5	(1)
2019	→ Linense (loan)	7	(0)
2019	→ Inter de Limeira (loan)	8	(0)
2020	→ Nacional-SP (loan)	2	(0)
2021	CEOV	14	(5)
2021	Inter de Santa Maria	12	(0)
2022	União Beltrão	11	(3)
2022–2025	Azuriz	56	(8)
2023	→ Volta Redonda (loan)	0	(0)
2024	→ FC Cascavel (loan)	8	(0)
2025–	Blumenau	11	(7)
2026	→ Avenida (loan)	12	(6)
- * Club domestic league appearances and goals as of 22 April 2026

Wellisson Almeida Nunes (born 9 July 1996), simply known as Wellisson, is a Brazilian professional footballer who plays as a forward for Blumenau.

== Career ==
Discovered by Londrina's youth teams, Wellisson spent most of his career playing for teams in the countryside of São Paulo and the southern region of Brazil. In 2026, he stood out as the top scorer in the Rio Grande do Sul state championship while playing for EC Avenida.

== Honours ==
Londrina

- Primeira Liga: 2017

Individual

- 2026 Campeonato Gaúcho top scorer: 6 goals
