= Toninho (footballer, born 1973) =

Brazilian footballer

Personal information
- Full name: Antônio Marcos Tobias
- Date of birth: 10 June 1973 (age 53)
- Place of birth: São Paulo, Brazil
- Height: 1.73 m (5 ft 8 in)
- Position: Forward

Youth career
- 1986–1993: São Paulo

Senior career*
Years	Team	Apps	(Gls)
1991–1997	São Paulo	12	(2)
1995–1996	→ Anderlecht (loan)		
1997	→ Audax Italiano (loan)		
1997	→ Araçatuba (loan)		
1998–2000	Salgueiros		
1999	→ Figueirense (loan)		
2000	Ulsan Hyundai		
2001	Al Shabab		
2001–2003	CSA		
2004–2005	ASA		
2006	Rio Branco-MG		
2006	CRB		
2013	Taboão da Serra		

International career
1988–1989	Brazil U17		
- * Club domestic league appearances and goals

Antônio Marcos Tobias (born 10 June 1973), better known as Toninho, is a Brazilian former professional footballer, who played as a forward.

== Career ==
Toninho was part of the São Paulo squad known as "Expressinho", which included names like Rogério Ceni, Mona and Paulo Jamelli. He was loaned to Anderlecht and Audax Italiano before being traded to Salgueiros of Portugal. Afterwards he played in Asia and in football in the state of Alagoas. In 2013 he returned to football at Taboão da Serra.

== Personal life ==
Toninho is the younger brother of retired footballer Sídney.

== Honours ==
São Paulo

- Copa São Paulo de Futebol Jr.: 1993
- Copa CONMEBOL: 1994

ASA

- Campeonato Alagoano: 2005

Brazil U17

- South American Under-17 Football Championship: 1988
