= Nelson Simões =

Brazilian footballer

Nelson
Personal information
- Full name: Nelson Simões Júnior
- Date of birth: 23 March 1972 (age 54)
- Place of birth: Nova Andradina, Brazil
- Position: Centre-back

Team information
- Current team: Bahia (assistant)

Youth career
- –1987: São Bento
- 1987–1993: São Paulo

Senior career*
| Years | Team | Apps | (Gls) |
| 1993–1995 | São Paulo | 37 | (0) |
| 1996 | Rio Branco-SP | | |
| 1997 | União Bandeirante | | |
| 1997 | América de Natal | | |
| 1998 | Caldense | | |
| 1998 | América de Natal | | |
| 1999 | Portuguesa Santista | | |
| 2002 | Caldense | | |
| 2003–2005 | Shenzhen Jianlibao | | |
| 2006 | Juventus-SP | | |
| 2008 | CRB | | |

Managerial career
- 2017: São Paulo (assistant)
- 2019: Fortaleza (assistant)
- 2019: Cruzeiro (assistant)
- 2019–2020: Fortaleza (assistant)
- 2020–2021: Flamengo (assistant)
- 2021–2023: São Paulo (assistant)
- 2023–: Bahia (assistant)
- * Club domestic league appearances and goals

Nelson Simões Júnior (born 23 March 1972), simply known as Nelson, is a Brazilian former professional footballer who played as a centre-back.

== Career ==
Formed in São Paulo's youth categories, he was part of the squad known as "Expressinho". In 1995 he was traded to Rio Branco de Americana and then played for several other clubs. He was part of the Minas Gerais champion squad with AA Caldense in 2002. Nelson is currently one of the permanent assistants on coach Rogério Ceni's staff.

== Honours ==
São Paulo

- Copa São Paulo de Futebol Jr.: 1993
- Copa CONMEBOL: 1994

Caldense

- Campeonato Mineiro: 2002

Shenzhen Jianlibao

- Chinese Super League: 2004
