= 1993 Campeonato Ecuatoriano de Fútbol Serie A =

Serie A
- Season: 1993
- Champions: Emelec (7th title)
- Relegated: Técnico Universitario; Santos
- Copa Libertadores: Emelec; Barcelona
- Copa CONMEBOL: El Nacional
- Matches: 184
- Goals: 499 (2.71 per match)
- Top goalscorer: Diego Herrera (21 goals)

The 1993 Campeonato Ecuatoriano de Fútbol de la Serie A was the 35th season of the Serie A, the top level of professional football in Ecuador.

== Teams ==
The number of teams for this season was played by 12 teams.

Club	City
Aucas	Quito
Barcelona	Guayaquil
Delfín	Manta
Deportivo Cuenca	Cuenca
Deportivo Quito	Quito
El Nacional	Quito
Emelec	Guayaquil
Green Cross	Manta
LDU Quito	Quito
Santos	El Guabo
Universidad Católica	Quito
Valdez	Guayaquil

== First stage ==
=== Hexagonal 1 ===
Pos	Team	Pld	W	D	L	GF	GA	GD	Pts	Qualification or relegation
1	Emelec	10	6	2	2	20	7	+13	14	Qualified to the Octagonal Final
2	Delfín	10	6	2	2	12	7	+5	14	Qualified to the Octagonal Final
3	El Nacional	10	5	1	4	12	8	+4	11	
4	LDU Quito	10	2	5	3	13	16	−3	9	
5	Técnico Universitario	10	2	5	3	10	16	−6	9	
6	Valdez	10	1	3	6	7	20	−13	5	

Source: RSSSF
Rules for classification: 1) points; 2) goal difference; 3) number of goals scored.

=== Hexagonal 2 ===
Pos	Team	Pld	W	D	L	GF	GA	GD	Pts	Qualification or relegation
1	Barcelona	10	7	2	1	24	12	+12	16	Qualified to the Octagonal Final
2	Green Cross	10	4	4	2	10	10	0	12	Qualified to the Octagonal Final
3	Deportivo Quito	10	3	3	4	13	11	+2	9	
4	Aucas	10	2	4	4	12	13	−1	8	
5	Santos	10	2	4	4	13	19	−6	8	
6	Deportivo Cuenca	10	1	5	4	7	14	−7	7	

Source: RSSSF
Rules for classification: 1) points; 2) goal difference; 3) number of goals scored.

== Second stage ==
=== Hexagonal 1 ===
Pos	Team	Pld	W	D	L	GF	GA	GD	Pts	Qualification or relegation
1	Deportivo Cuenca	10	5	4	1	12	6	+6	14	Qualified to the Octagonal Final
2	LDU Quito	10	5	2	3	18	14	+4	12	Qualified to the Octagonal Final
3	Emelec	10	3	5	2	11	9	+2	11	
4	El Nacional	10	4	1	5	12	10	+2	9	Qualified to the Octagonal Final
5	Delfín	10	3	3	4	14	16	−2	9	
6	Santos (R)	10	1	3	6	5	17	−12	5	Relegated to the Serie B

Source: RSSSF
Rules for classification: 1) points; 2) goal difference; 3) number of goals scored.
(R) Relegated

=== Hexagonal 2 ===
Pos	Team	Pld	W	D	L	GF	GA	GD	Pts	Qualification or relegation
1	Barcelona	10	5	3	2	21	12	+9	13	
2	Valdez	10	5	2	3	15	11	+4	12	
3	Aucas	10	4	4	2	23	19	+4	12	
4	Deportivo Quito	10	3	4	3	16	16	0	10	Qualified to the Octagonal Final
5	Green Cross	10	3	1	6	8	16	−8	7	
6	Técnico Universitario (R)	10	2	2	6	8	17	−9	6	Relegated to the Serie B

Source: RSSSF
Rules for classification: 1) points; 2) goal difference; 3) number of goals scored.
(R) Relegated

== Aggregate table ==
Pos	Team	Pld	W	D	L	GF	GA	GD	Pts	Qualification or relegation
1	Emelec (C)	34	18	8	8	58	25	+33	44	1994 Copa Libertadores
2	Barcelona	34	20	7	7	65	34	+31	47	1994 Copa Libertadores
3	El Nacional	34	17	4	13	46	31	+15	38	1994 Copa CONMEBOL
4	Delfín	34	15	6	13	47	50	−3	36	
5	Deportivo Cuenca	34	11	12	11	33	43	−10	34	
6	LDU Quito	34	11	10	13	50	54	−4	32	
7	Green Cross	34	12	8	14	38	47	−9	32	
8	Deportivo Quito	34	8	10	16	42	56	−14	26	
9	Aucas	20	6	8	6	22	25	−3	20	
10	Valdez	20	6	5	9	22	31	−9	17	
11	Técnico Universitario (R)	20	4	5	11	18	33	−15	13	Relegation to the Serie B
12	Santos (R)	20	3	7	10	18	36	−18	13	Relegation to the Serie B

Source: RSSSF
Rules for classification: 1) points; 2) goal difference; 3) number of goals scored.
(C) Champions; (R) Relegated

== Octagonal Final ==
Pos	Team	Pld	W	D	L	GF	GA	GD	Pts	Qualification or relegation
1	Emelec	14	9	1	4	27	9	+18	19	1994 Copa Libertadores
2	Barcelona	14	8	2	4	20	10	+10	18	Qualification for the Runner-up playoff
3	El Nacional	14	8	2	4	22	13	+9	18	Qualification for the Runner-up playoff
4	Green Cross	14	5	3	6	20	21	−1	13	Qualification for the Triangular Pre-CONMEBOL
5	Delfín	14	6	1	7	21	27	−6	13	Qualification for the Triangular Pre-CONMEBOL
6	Deportivo Cuenca	14	5	3	6	14	23	−9	13	Qualification for the Triangular Pre-CONMEBOL
7	LDU Quito	14	4	3	7	19	24	−5	11	
8	Deportivo Quito	14	2	3	9	13	29	−16	7	

Source: RSSSF - 1993 Serie A

Campeonato Ecuatoriano de Fútbol
1993 champion

== Runner-up playoff ==
They played against Barcelona and El Nacional, the winner of which finished runner-up and qualified for the 1994 Copa Libertadores, while the loser had to play against the winner of the Pre-Conmebol Triangular to play for a place in the 1994 Copa CONMEBOL.

19 December 1993

El Nacional	1–0	Barcelona

22 December 1993

Barcelona	3–1	El Nacional

== Triangular Pre-CONMEBOL ==
Pos	Team	Pld	W	D	L	GF	GA	GD	Pts	Qualification or relegation
1	Green Cross	4	3	1	0	10	4	+6	7	Qualification for the Fase Pre-CONMEBOL
2	Deportivo Cuenca	4	1	1	2	7	7	0	3	
3	Delfín	4	0	2	2	5	11	−6	2	

Source: RSSSF - 1993 Serie A

== Fase Pre-CONMEBOL ==
They faced each other between El Nacional (loser of the subtitle match) and Green Cross (best placed in the Pre-Conmebol Triangular Cup). The winner was El Nacional and they qualified for the 1994 Copa CONMEBOL.

19 December 1993

Green Cross	0–0	El Nacional

22 December 1993

El Nacional	4–2	Green Cross
