= Mona (Brazilian footballer) =

Brazilian footballer

Personal information
- Full name: Marcelo Alexandre Pires Correia
- Date of birth: 4 June 1973 (age 53)
- Place of birth: Votorantim, Brazil
- Height: 1.73 m (5 ft 8 in)
- Position: Midfielder

Youth career
- –1991: São Bento
- 1992–1994: São Paulo

Senior career*
Years	Team	Apps	(Gls)
1992–1996	São Paulo	65	(0)
1994	→ Marília (loan)		
1996–1997	Vila Nova		
1998	Araçatuba		
1999	Ituano		
1999–2000	Comercial-SP		
2000	Botafogo-SP		
2002	Francisco Beltrão		
- * Club domestic league appearances and goals as of 28 September 2023

Marcelo Alexandre Pires Correia (born 4 June 1973), simply known as Mona, is a Brazilian former professional footballer who played as a midfielder.

== Career ==
Mona was part of the São Paulo squad known as "Expressinho", which included names like Rogério Ceni and Paulo Jamelli. After 1996, he played for several other clubs in Brazil without managing to establish himself.

== Honours ==
São Paulo

- Copa Libertadores: 1992
- Copa São Paulo de Futebol Jr.: 1993
- Copa CONMEBOL: 1994
