= Sinval =

Brazilian footballer

Personal information
- Full name: Sinval Ferreira da Silva
- Date of birth: 8 May 1971 (age 55)
- Place of birth: Andradina, Brazil
- Position: Forward

Youth career
- –1991: Portuguesa

Senior career*
Years	Team	Apps	(Gls)
1989–1995	Portuguesa		
1992	→ Grêmio (loan)		
1992	→ Paysandu (loan)		
1993	→ Novorizontino (loan)		
1993	→ Botafogo (loan)		
1995–1997	Lugano		
1997	Botafogo		
1998–1999	Coritiba		
1999	→ Inter de Limeira (loan)		
2000	Santa Cruz		
2000	Vitória		
2001	São Caetano		
2001	Fortaleza		
2001	Guarani		
2002	Portuguesa		
2002	Fortaleza		
2002	América Mineiro		
2003	Brasiliense		
2003	Marília		
2004	Cabofriense		
2004	Ulbra-RS		
2004	Boavista		
2004	Paraná		
2005	Ituiutaba		
2005	Portuguesa Santista		
2005	Noroeste		
2006	Cianorte		
2006	J. Malucelli		
2006	Bangu		
2006	Madureira		
2007	AA Rioverdense		
2007	Imperatriz		
2007	Grêmio Barueri		

Managerial career
- 2010: Misto
- * Club domestic league appearances and goals as of 21 November 2023

Sinval Ferreira da Silva (born 08 May 1971), simply known as Sinval, is a Brazilian former professional footballer who played as a forward.

== Career ==
Trained in the youth sectors of Portuguesa, Sinval was promoted to professional in 1989, but still in 1991, he participated in the Copa SP de Jrs. champion squad, forming an attacking partner alongside Dener. On loan, he was champion of Pará with Paysandu in 1992. In 1993, he was top scorer and CONMEBOL Cup champion with Botafogo.

He played football in Switzerland at FC Lugano, and returned to Brazil. In 1999 he was state champion with Coritiba. In 2000, at EC Vitória, he was one of the team's highlights in that season's Brazilian Championship campaign. He played for several other clubs, but without repeating his former success. He ended his career in 2007, at Grêmio Barueri.

== Personal life ==
After retiring, he started investing in the real estate market in his hometown, Andradina, where he owns some projects such as 3 motels.

In 2010, he became a coach, commanding the Misto EC de Três Lagoas team in the 2010 Campeonato Sul-Mato-Grossense.

== Honours ==
Portuguesa

- Copa São Paulo de Futebol Jr.: 1991

Paysandu

- Campeonato Paraense: 1992

Botafogo

- Copa CONMEBOL: 1993

Coritiba

- Campeonato Paranaense: 1999

Individual

- 1993 Copa CONMEBOL top scorer: 8 goals
