= Giba (footballer) =

Brazilian footballer (1962-2014)

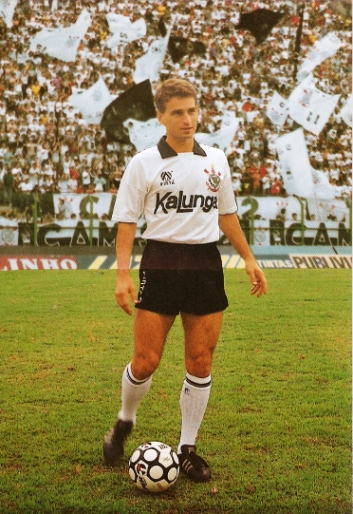

Personal information
- Full name: Antonio Gilberto Maniaes
- Date of birth: 7 March 1962
- Place of birth: Cordeirópolis, Brazil
- Date of death: 24 June 2014 (aged 52)
- Place of death: São Paulo, Brazil
- Position: Right back

Youth career
- Juventus de Cordeirópolis
- Independente
- 1979: Guarani

Senior career*
Years	Team	Apps	(Gls)
1980	Independente	0	(0)
1981–1982	Inter de Limeira	0	(0)
1982–1983	União São João	0	(0)
1984–1989	Guarani	15	(1)
1989–1993	Corinthians	72	(6)

International career
1991	Brazil	1	(0)

Managerial career
- 1996–1997: Lousano Paulista
- 1997–1998: CSA
- 1998–1999: Sãocarlense
- 2000: Santos
- 2000–2001: Etti Jundiaí
- 2001–2002: Gama
- 2002–2003: Guarani
- 2003–2004: Kuwait SC
- 2004–2005: Atlético Sorocaba
- 2005–2006: Portuguesa
- 2006: Santa Cruz
- 2006–2007: Remo
- 2007: Sport
- 2007: São Caetano
- 2008: Paulista
- 2008: Ipatinga
- 2009: Fortaleza
- 2010: Rio Branco-SP
- 2010: Remo
- 2011: Joinville
- 2011: Guarani
- 2012: Grêmio Barueri
- 2013–2014: Paulista
- * Club domestic league appearances and goals

Antônio Gilberto Maniaes (7 March 1962 – 24 June 2014), commonly known as Giba, was a Brazilian retired footballer who played as a right back, and a former manager. He made one appearance for the Brazil national team in 1991.

Giba notably represented Guarani and Corinthians as a player, while being in charge of more than 20 clubs as a manager.

== Honours ==
=== Manager ===
CSA

- Campeonato Alagoano: 1998

Etti Jundiaí

- Campeonato Brasileiro Série C: 2001
- Campeonato Paulista Série A2: 2001
