= Gerardo Rabajda =

Uruguayan footballer (born 1967)

Personal information
- Full name: Gerardo Daniel Rabajda Maino
- Date of birth: August 13, 1967 (age 59)
- Place of birth: Montevideo, Uruguay
- Height: 1.86 m (6 ft 1 in)
- Position: Goalkeeper

Youth career
- Peñarol

Senior career*
Years	Team	Apps	(Gls)
1989–1993	Peñarol		
1994–1995	Unión Española	43	(0)
1995–1999	Puebla	92	(0)
1999–2001	Sevilla	2	(0)
2001–2002	Rosario Central	0	(0)
2002	Danubio	0	(0)
2004	Fénix	3	(0)
- * Club domestic league appearances and goals

Gerardo Daniel Rabajda Maino (born 13 August 1967 in Montevideo) is a former Uruguayan football goalkeeper. Besides Uruguay, he played for clubs in Chile, Mexico, Spain and Argentina.

== Teams ==
- (Uruguay) Peñarol 1989–1993
- (Chile) Unión Española 1994–1995
- (Mexico) Puebla 1995–1999
- (Spain) Sevilla 1999–2001
- (Argentina) Rosario Central 2001–2002
- (Uruguay) Danubio 2002
- (Uruguay) Fénix 2004
