= Tosin (footballer) =

Brazilian footballer

Personal information
- Full name: Paulo César Tosin
- Date of birth: 16 April 1966 (age 60)
- Place of birth: Marília, Brazil
- Height: 1.85 m (6 ft 1 in)
- Position: Midfielder

Youth career
- –1985: Guarani

Senior career*
Years	Team	Apps	(Gls)
1985–1989	Guarani		
1989	Corinthians		
1990–1991	Vasco da Gama		
1991–1992	Marília		
1992	Sãocarlense		
1993–1996	Vila Nova		
2002	Marília		

International career
1985	Brazil U20		
- * Club domestic league appearances and goals as of 4 October 2024

Paulo César Tosin (born 16 April 1966), simply known as Tosin, is a Brazilian former professional footballer who played as a midfielder.

== Career ==
Revealed by the youth sectors of Guarani FC, Tosin was part of the South American and World Champion squads with the Brazil under-20 team in 1985. With Guarani, he was runner-up in Brazilian Championship in 1986 and 1987, and in the 1988 Campeonato Paulista. A midfielder who stood out for his mobility, Tosin later played for Corinthians and Vasco, where he won the Guanabara Cup in 1990. Playing for Vila Nova, he was state champion on two occasions, in 1993 and 1995.

== Honours ==
Vasco da Gama

- Taça Guanabara: 1990

Vila Nova

- Campeonato Goiano: 1993, 1995

Brazil U20

- FIFA U-20 World Cup: 1985
- South American U-20 Championship: 1985
