= Clube Esportivo União =

União Beltrão
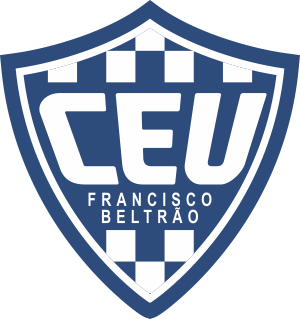
- Full name: Clube Esportivo União
- Nickname(s): Azulão
- Founded: February 15, 1956; 69 years ago
- Ground: Estádio Anilado
- Capacity: 7,000
- President: Otávio Muniz
- Head coach: Agenor Piccinin
- League: Campeonato Paranaense
- 2020: Paranaense, 12th (relegated)
- Website: http://www.clubeesportivouniao.com.br/
Home colours	Away colours	colours

Clube Esportivo União, more commonly referred to as União Beltrão, is a Brazilian professional association football club in Francisco Beltrão, Paraná which currently plays in Campeonato Paranaense, the top division of the Paraná state football league.

== Honours ==
- Campeonato Paranaense Série Prata
  - Winners (1): 1979
  - Runners-up (5): 1981, 1982, 2017, 2019, 2021
- Campeonato Paranaense Série Bronze
  - Winners (1): 2016
