= Rinaldo (footballer, born 1966) =

Brazilian footballer

Personal information
- Full name: Antônio Rinaldo Gonçalves
- Date of birth: 31 October 1966 (age 60)
- Place of birth: Campina Grande, Brazil
- Height: 1.79 m (5 ft 10 in)
- Position: Forward

Senior career*
Years	Team	Apps	(Gls)
- Campinense
- Treze
1987–1988	Santa Cruz	36	(5)
1989–1990	Fluminense	21	(7)
1991–1992	São Paulo	15	(2)
1992–1993	Sport Recife		
- Portuguesa
1993	Gamba Osaka	4	(0)
- Marítimo
- Moreirense
- Juventude
2004	Kärnten		
- * Club domestic league appearances and goals

Antônio Rinaldo Gonçalves, commonly known simply as Rinaldo (born 31 October 1966) is a Brazilian former footballer. He played for several Campeonato Brasileiro Série A clubs. He also played for Portuguese Liga clubs and for the Brazil national team.

== Career ==
Born in Campina Grande, Paraíba state, Rinaldo started his professional career playing for Campinense, then moving to their rivals Treze. He played 36 Série A games for Santa Cruz between 1987 and 1988, scoring five goals. He then joined Fluminense, playing 21 Série A games and scoring seven goals for the Rio de Janeiro-based club. With São Paulo, Rinaldo played 15 Série A games, scoring two goals, between 1991 and 1992. Including other competition games, he played 28 games for São Paulo, and scored four goals. In 1992, he played four Copa do Brasil games for Sport Recife, scoring four goals. He left the club after the 1993 season. After leaving Sport Recife, he played for Portuguesa, then Portuguese Liga clubs Marítimo and Moreirense, Juventude, and in 1994 Kärnten of Austria, when he retired and moved to Recife city.

=== National team ===
Rinaldo played only one unofficial game for the Brazil national team, in 1990. It was a friendly game against a Rest of the World combined team to celebrate Pelé's 50th birthday. The game was played on 31 October 1990, at Stadio San Siro, Milan, Italy, and Brazil was defeated 2–1. The game is notorious because after Rinaldo received a pass from Pelé, instead of returning the ball to him, he shot the ball, missing the goal, and preventing Pelé from scoring his 1282nd goal.
