= Eliel (footballer, born 1969) =

Brazilian footballer

Personal information
- Full name: Eliel Henrique dos Santos
- Date of birth: 6 January 1969 (age 57)
- Place of birth: São Paulo, Brazil
- Positions: Forward; attacking midfielder

Youth career
- São Paulo

Senior career*
Years	Team	Apps	(Gls)
1989–1992	São Paulo	25	(8)
1989	→ Rio Preto (loan)		
1991–1992	→ Yanmar Diesel (loan)		
1993	Botafogo		
1994	Ponte Preta		
1994	Alianza Lima		
1995–1996	Criciúma		
1997	Araçatuba		
1998	Arsenal Tula		
1999	Hyundai Horang-I		
2000	Portuguesa Santista		
2000	Coritiba		
2001	Belenenses		
2001	Sport Recife		
2002	CSA		
2002	Botafogo-SP		
- * Club domestic league appearances and goals

Eliel Henrique dos Santos (born 6 January 1969), simply known as Eliel, is a Brazilian former professional footballer who played as a forward and attacking midfielder.

== Career ==
A player with great vision of the game and a finisher, Eliel joined São Paulo in 1990. Due to strong competition, he was loaned to Japanese football, and later to Botafogo where he won the CONMEBOL Cup. He played for several other teams in Brazil, Asia and Europe. After retiring as a player, he went to work in football in Saudi Arabia.

== Honours ==
São Paulo

- Campeonato Brasileiro: 1991
- Campeonato Paulista 1992

Botafogo

- Copa CONMEBOL: 1993
