= Óscar Ferro =

Uruguayan footballer (born 1967)

Personal information
- Full name: Óscar Julio Ferro Gándara
- Date of birth: 2 March 1967 (age 59)
- Place of birth: Montevideo, Uruguay
- Height: 1.84 m (6 ft 0 in)
- Position: Goalkeeper

Senior career*
Years	Team	Apps	(Gls)
1984–1995	Peñarol	181	(0)
1995–1998	Ferro Carril Oeste	72	(0)
1998–1999	Sporting Cristal	55	(0)
1999–2000	Compostela	2	(0)
2000	Atlético Tucumán	29	(0)
2001	Defensor	5	(0)
2001	Guaraní	6	(0)
2002–2003	Peñarol	6	(0)

International career
1988–1995	Uruguay	9	(0)
Medal record
Representing Uruguay
Copa América
Winner	1995 Uruguay
- * Club domestic league appearances and goals

Óscar Julio Ferro Gándara (born 2 March 1967) is a retired Uruguayan footballer who played as a goalkeeper.

== Club career ==
Born in Montevideo, Ferro started and finished his career with local and national giants C.A. Peñarol, winning five of his six national championships with the team in his first spell, which lasted 11 years. In 1995, he moved to Argentina and Ferro Carril Oeste, playing three seasons in the Primera División.

In the following years, in quick succession, Ferro represented Peru's Sporting Cristal, SD Compostela from Spain, Atlético Tucumán (Argentine second division), Defensor Sporting Club and Paraguayan side Club Guaraní. In 2002, the 35-year-old returned to his first club, Peñarol, being part of the squad that won that year's league and retiring at the end of the next campaign.

Subsequently, Ferro continued to work with Peñarol as a goalkeeping coach.

== International career ==
Ferro gained nine caps for Uruguay in seven years. He was selected for the teams that competed at the 1993 and 1995 Copa América tournaments– the latter ended in conquest for the Charrúas – but played backup on both occasions, to Robert Siboldi and Fernando Álvez respectively.

== Honours ==
=== Club ===
Peñarol

- Uruguayan Primera División: 1985, 1986, 1993, 1994, 1995, 2003
- Copa Libertadores: 1987

=== Country ===
- Copa América: 1995
