= Francisco Beltrão Futebol Clube =

Francisco Beltrão
- Full name: Francisco Beltrão Futebol Clube
- Nickname(s): Tricolor do Sudoeste
- Founded: January 4, 1993
- Ground: Estádio Anilado, Francisco Beltrão, Paraná state, Brazil
- Capacity: 12,000
Home colours	Away colours

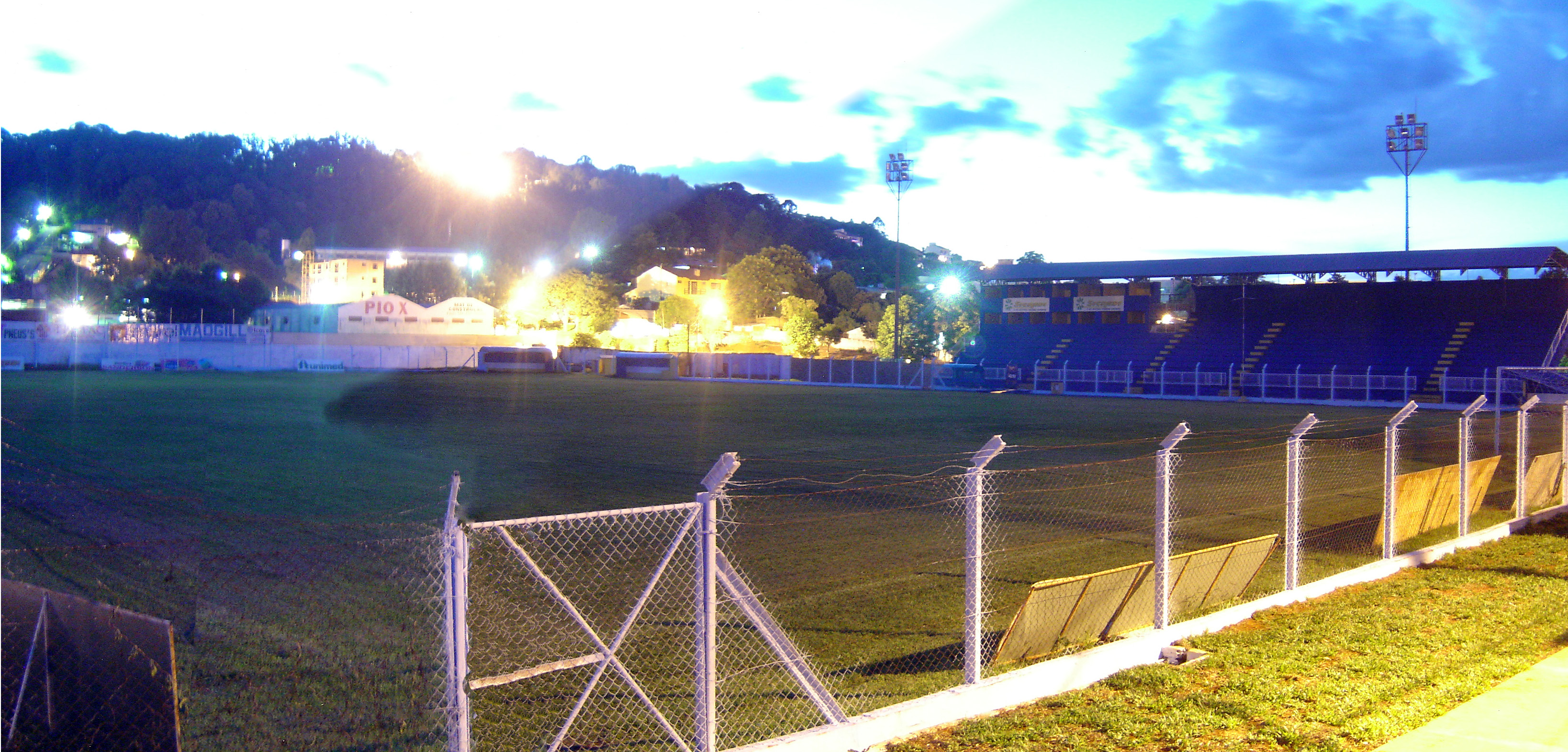
Estádio Anilado

Francisco Beltrão Futebol Clube, commonly known as Francisco Beltrão, is a Brazilian football club based in Francisco Beltrão, Paraná state.

== History ==
The club was founded on January 4, 1993. They won the Campeonato Paranaense Second Level in 2000 and in 2002.

== Achievements ==
- Campeonato Paranaense Second Level:
  - Winners (2): 2000, 2002

== Stadium ==
Francisco Beltrão Futebol Clube play their home games at Estádio Anilado. The stadium has a maximum capacity of 12,000 people.
