= Tato (footballer, born 1964) =

Brazilian footballer

Personal information
- Full name: Ederval Luís Lourenço da Conceição
- Date of birth: 15 October 1964 (age 62)
- Place of birth: Santa Bárbara d'Oeste, Brazil
- Height: 1.70 m (5 ft 7 in)
- Position: Right winger

Youth career
- 1982–1984: Inter de Limeira

Senior career*
| Years | Team | Apps | (Gls) |
| 1985–1986 | Inter de Limeira | | |
| 1987–1988 | Palmeiras | 60 | (11) |
| 1989–1990 | Guarani | | |
| 1990 | Atlético Mineiro | 19 | (1) |
| 1991–1992 | Inter de Limeira | | |
| 1993 | União São João | | |
| 1993–1994 | Leones Negros UdeG | | |

International career
| 1987 | Brazil U20 | | |
- * Club domestic league appearances and goals as of 16 February 2024

Ederval Luís Lourenço da Conceição (born 15 October 1964), better known as Tato, is a Brazilian former professional footballer who played as a right winger.

== Career ==
Tato made history by scoring one of Inter de Limeira's goals against Palmeiras in the final of the 1986 Campeonato Paulista (alongside Kita), which guaranteed the first title for a countryside team in the state of São Paulo. He later played for Palmeiras, Guarani, Atlético Mineiro, União São João and Leones Negros.

Tato also played for Brazil U20 team, during the 1987 Toulon Tournament.

== Honours ==
Inter de Limeira

- Campeonato Paulista: 1986

Atlético Mineiro

- Ramón de Carranza Trophy: 1990
