= Anílton da Conceição =

Brazilian footballer and coach (born 1968)

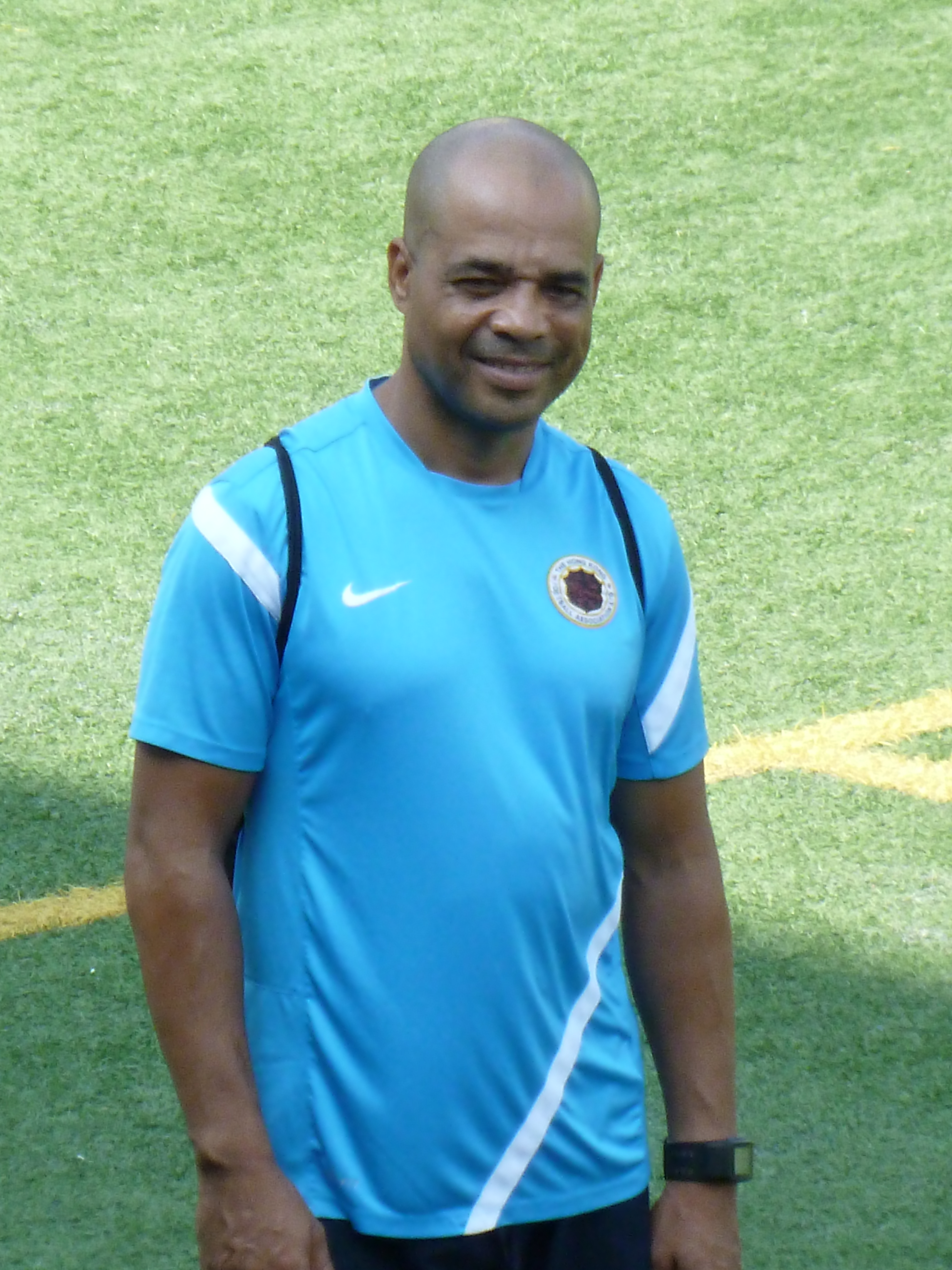
Anílton in 2013

Anílton da Conceição (born 15 March 1968) is a Brazilian football coach and former player who coaches Hong Kong University Graduates Association Primary School. He played as a midfielder for São Paulo, Hong Kong Rangers, Kitchee, South China. In 2009, he became the assistant coach for South China.

== Managerial career ==
Anílton has been working as a coach for HKUGAPS since 2006 and coaches the school team which came fourth in the Eastern Cup. In addition, he was the assistant coach of South China, and helped the club to find good foreign players in Western countries and Brazil. He also helps Yes Brazil.

He left the job as assistant coach of Hong Kong national football team at September 2022, he served for about 11 years. on 24 September 2022, Hong Kong fans thanks to Anílton for his efforts for the Hong Kong national football team and play football in Hong Kong.

== Honours ==
=== Player ===
São Paulo

- Campeonato Paulista: 1991
