= Tico (footballer, born 1964) =

Brazilian footballer

Personal information
- Full name: Admílson Oliveira da Silva
- Date of birth: 14 November 1964 (age 61)
- Place of birth: Brasília, Brazil
- Height: 1.85 m (6 ft 1 in)
- Position: Forward

Youth career
- Matsubara

Senior career*
Years	Team	Apps	(Gls)
1988–1990	Matsubara		
1989	→ São Paulo (loan)	6	(0)
1990–1992	Atlético Paranaense		
1992	Coritiba		
1993–1994	União da Madeira		
1994–1995	Paços de Ferreira		
1995–1996	Vitória de Setúbal		
1997	Paços de Ferreira		
1997	Matsubara		
- * Club domestic league appearances and goals as of 12 April 2024

Admílson Oliveira da Silva (born 14 November 1964), better known as Tico, is a Brazilian former professional footballer who played as a forward.

== Career ==
Top scorer in the Paraná championship in 1989 and 1990 for SE Matsubara, he was loaned to São Paulo FC where he played 6 matches. In the following years, Tico played for Athletico Paranaense, Coritiba, as well as clubs in Portugal. He ended his career as a player at the age of 32 at Matsubara. Works in the scouting department at Athletico Paranaense since 2015.

== Honours ==
Individual

- 1989 Campeonato Paranaense top scorer: 24 goals
- 1990 Campeonato Paranaense top scorer: 20 goals
