= Baiano (footballer, born 1969) =

Brazilian footballer

Personal information
- Full name: Rogério Martins da Silva
- Date of birth: 16 January 1969 (age 57)
- Place of birth: Feira de Santana, Brazil
- Height: 1.76 m (5 ft 9 in)
- Position: Midfielder

Youth career
- São Paulo

Senior career*
| Years | Team | Apps | (Gls) |
| 1987–1992 | São Paulo | 26 | (7) |
| 1991–1992 | → Noroeste (loan) | | |
- * Club domestic league appearances and goals as of 10 February 2024

Rogério Martins da Silva (born 16 January 1969), better known as Baiano, is a Brazilian former professional footballer who played as a midfielder.

== Career ==
Born in Feira de Santana, Baiano was revealed in São Paulo's youth categories in 1987. He participated in two state victories, in 1987 and 1991, playing mainly as a defensive midfielder. He was later transferred to Noroeste where he became the team's central midfielder. He was characterized by being one of the first Brazilian football players to wear Rastafarian hair.

== Honours ==
São Paulo

- Campeonato Paulista: 1987, 1991
