= Pavão (footballer, born 1974) =

Brazilian footballer

Personal information
- Full name: Marcelo Pereira Moreira
- Date of birth: April 15, 1974 (age 52)
- Place of birth: Recife, Brazil
- Height: 1.67 m (5 ft 6 in)
- Position: Right-back

Youth career
- 1992: São Paulo

Senior career*
Years	Team	Apps	(Gls)
1993–1995	São Paulo	24	(0)
1996	Atlético Paranaense		
1996	Rio Branco-SP		
1997	Atlético Goianiense		
1997–1999	Austria Lustenau		
1999–2000	Tenerife		
2001	Mogi Mirim		
2002	Treze		
2002	Brasiliense		
- * Club domestic league appearances and goals

Marcelo Pereira Moreira, commonly known as Pavão (born April 15, 1974), is a Brazilian former professional footballer who played as a right-back for several Brazilian Série A clubs.

== Career ==
Born in Recife, Pavão started his professional career playing with São Paulo in 1993, being promoted from the youth team. With São Paulo, he played 24 Série A games without scoring a goal between 1993 and 1995. He left São Paulo in 1995, joining Atlético Paranaense in 1996. After playing for Rio Branco-SP and Atlético Goianiense respectively in 1996 and in 1997, he left Brazil to play for Austrian club Austria Lustenau from 1997 to 1999, and Tenerife of Spain from 1999 to 2000. Pavão returned to his country in 2001 to play for Mogi Mirim in 2001, leaving the club in 2002 to defend Treze and retiring in the same year when playing for Brasiliense.
