= Danilo Baltierra =

Uruguayan footballer (born 1968)

Personal information
- Full name: Danilo Baltierra Cravi
- Date of birth: October 4, 1968 (age 58)
- Place of birth: Montevideo, Uruguay
- Height: 1.82 m (6 ft 0 in)
- Position: Midfielder

Senior career*
Years	Team	Apps	(Gls)
1986–1991	Cerro		
1992–1996	Peñarol		
1996–1997	Logroñés	25	(1)
1997–1998	Nacional	11	(3)
1998	Villa Española		
1999	River Plate Montevideo		
2000	O'Higgins	16	(2)
2001	Rentistas		
2002	Progreso		
2003	Cerro		

International career
1985	Uruguay U16		(1)

Managerial career
- 2013–2014: Cerro (youth)
- 2013: Cerro
- 2014–2015: Hebraica Universitario
- * Club domestic league appearances and goals

Danilo Baltierra Cravi (born October 4, 1968) is a Uruguayan former footballer who played as a midfielder for clubs in Uruguay, Chile and Spain.

== Teams (Player) ==
- (Uruguay) Cerro 1986–1991
- (Uruguay) Peñarol 1991–1996
- (Spain) Logroñés 1996–1997
- (Uruguay) Nacional 1998
- (Uruguay) Villa Española 1998
- (Uruguay) River Plate 1999
- (Uruguay) Rentistas 2000
- (Chile) O'Higgins 2000
- (Uruguay) Rentistas 2001
- (Uruguay) Progreso 2002
- (Uruguay) Cerro 2003

== International ==
- Uruguay U16 1985

== Teams (Coach) ==
- (Uruguay) Cerro (youth) 2013–2014
- (Uruguay) Cerro 2013
- (Uruguay) Hebraica Universitario 2014–2015

== Titles ==
- Peñarol 1993, 1994, 1995 and 1996 (Uruguayan Primera División Championship)
- Nacional 1998 (Uruguayan Primera División Championship)
