= Washington Tais =

Uruguayan footballer (born 1972)

Personal information
- Full name: Washington Eduardo Tais Bidegaín
- Date of birth: 21 December 1972 (age 53)
- Place of birth: Montevideo, Uruguay
- Height: 1.80 m (5 ft 11 in)
- Position: Right back

Senior career*
Years	Team	Apps	(Gls)
1992–1997	Peñarol	118	(17)
1997–2001	Racing Santander	112	(4)
2001–2005	Betis	39	(0)
2011–2012	Danubio	30	(1)
2012–2013	Miramar Misiones	18	(1)
Total		277	(30)

International career
1995–2002	Uruguay	18	(0)
- * Club domestic league appearances and goals

Washington Eduardo Tais Bidegaín (born 21 December 1972) is a Uruguayan former professional footballer who played as a right back.

== Club career ==
Born in Montevideo, Tais' debuts in professional football were made with local giants Peñarol, whom he helped to five consecutive Primera División titles, the last three as an undisputed starter and where the player scored all his 24 league goals.

In the summer of 1997, Tais moved to Spain, where he would remain until his retirement. He started at Racing de Santander, being first-choice during his four-year spell which was always spent in La Liga – although the last season ended in relegation.

Subsequently, Tais signed for Real Betis, where constant injuries and loss of form made him miss nearly 30 games per season. In the 2004–05 campaign, he appeared in eleven matches in the league, and also helped the Andalusians to the Copa del Rey, although he was not named for their victory over Osasuna in the final;

On 27 January 2011, after more than five years out of football, 38-year-old Tais returned to professional football, signing with first club Danubio. He retired at the end of the following season, after a spell with Miramar Misiones in the Uruguayan Segunda División.

== International career ==
Tais made 18 appearances for Uruguay during seven years, including 13 FIFA World Cup qualifying matches. His debut occurred on 18 January 1995 in a friendly with Spain, as he came on as a half-time substitute for Ruben Alzueta in a 2–2 draw in A Coruña; he did not, however, attend any major international tournament.

Previously, Tais participated at the 1991 FIFA World Youth Championship, as the national under-20s scored no goals and conceded seven in Portugal.
