= 1994 Copa CONMEBOL =

Tournament details
- Teams: 16 (from 9 confederations)

Final positions
- Champions: (Brazil) São Paulo (1st title)
- Runners-up: (Uruguay) Peñarol

Tournament statistics
- Matches played: 30
- Top scorer(s): (Brazil) Juninho Paulista (Uruguay) Martín Rodríguez (5 goals each)

The 1994 Copa CONMEBOL was the third edition of CONMEBOL's annual club tournament. Teams that failed to qualify for the Copa Libertadores played in this tournament. Sixteen teams from nine South American football confederations qualified for this tournament. as in 1993, Colombia sent no representatives. São Paulo defeated Peñarol in the finals.

== Qualified teams ==
The following 16 teams from 9 CONMEBOL member associations qualified for the tournament.

- 1993 Copa CONMEBOL champions
- Brazil: 4 berths
- Argentina: 3 berths
- Uruguay: 2 berths
- All other associations: 1 berth each

Association	Team (Berth)	Qualification method
Argentina; 3 berths	San Lorenzo	1993–94 Argentine Primera División best team not participating in either the 1994 Supercopa Sudamericana or 1995 Copa Libertadores
Argentina; 3 berths	Huracán	1993–94 Argentine Primera División 2nd best team not participating in either the 1994 Supercopa Sudamericana or 1995 Copa Libertadores
Argentina; 3 berths	Lanús	1993–94 Argentine Primera División 3rd best team not participating in either the 1994 Supercopa Sudamericana or 1995 Copa Libertadores
Bolivia; 1 berth	Oriente Petrolero	1993 Liga de Fútbol Profesional Boliviano 4th place
Brazil; 4 berths + reigning champion	Botafogo	1993 Copa CONMEBOL champion
Brazil; 4 berths + reigning champion	Vitória	1993 Campeonato Brasileiro Série A runners-up
Brazil; 4 berths + reigning champion	Corinthians	1993 Campeonato Brasileiro Série A 3rd place
Brazil; 4 berths + reigning champion	São Paulo	1993 Campeonato Brasileiro Série A 4th place
Brazil; 4 berths + reigning champion	Grêmio	1993 Copa do Brasil runners-up
Chile; 1 berth	Universidad de Chile	1994 Liguilla Pre-CONMEBOL winner
Ecuador; 1 berth	El Nacional	1993 Campeonato Ecuatoriano de Fútbol Serie A winner of the Pre-CONMEBOL phase
Paraguay; 1 berth	Cerro Corá	Loser of the playoff between the 1993 Paraguayan Primera División runners-up and the 1993 Copa República winner
Peru; 1 berth	Sporting Cristal	1993 Torneo Descentralizado 2nd place of the Liguilla Pre-Libertadores
Uruguay; 2 berths	Peñarol	1993 Campeonato Uruguayo Primera División Liguilla Pre-Libertadores 3rd place
Uruguay; 2 berths	Danubio	1993 Campeonato Uruguayo Primera División Liguilla Pre-Libertadores 4th place
Venezuela; 1 berth	Minervén	1993–94 Venezuelan Primera División 3rd place

== Bracket ==
First round
(Brazil) Grêmio	0	0	0 (5)
(Brazil) São Paulo	0	0	0 (6)
(Peru) Sporting Cristal	2	1	3
(Ecuador) El Nacional	1	0	1
(Brazil) Corinthians	3	1	4
(Brazil) Vitória	2	1	3
(Venezuela) Minervén	1	0	1 (5)
(Brazil) Botafogo	1	0	1 (4)
(Uruguay) Danubio	0	1	1
(Uruguay) Peñarol	2	0	2
(Argentina) Huracán	1	2	3
(Paraguay) Cerro Corá	4	1	5
(Argentina) Lanús	1	2	3
(Argentina) San Lorenzo	1	2	3
(Bolivia) Oriente Petrolero	1	0	1
Universidad de Chile	4	5	9

Quarterfinals
(Brazil) São Paulo	3	0	3
(Peru) Sporting Cristal	1	0	1
(Brazil) Corinthians	6	5	11
(Venezuela) Minervén	0	2	2
(Uruguay) Peñarol	1	6	7
(Paraguay) Cerro Corá	3	1	4
(Argentina) San Lorenzo	1	1	2
Universidad de Chile	0	3	3

Semifinals
(Brazil) São Paulo	4	2	6 (5)
(Brazil) Corinthians	3	3	6 (4)
(Uruguay) Peñarol	2	1	3
Universidad de Chile	0	1	1

Finals
(Brazil) São Paulo	6	0	6
(Uruguay) Peñarol	1	3	4

== First round ==
Team 1	Agg.	Team 2	1st leg	2nd leg
Grêmio (Brazil)	0–0 (5–6 p)	(Brazil) São Paulo	0–0	0–0
Sporting Cristal (Peru)	3–1	(Ecuador) El Nacional	2–1	1–0
Corinthians (Brazil)	4–3	(Brazil) Vitória	3–2	1–1
Minervén (Venezuela)	1–1 (5–4 p)	(Brazil) Botafogo	1–1	0–0
Peñarol (Uruguay)	2–1	(Uruguay) Danubio	2–0	0–1
Huracán (Argentina)	3–5	(Paraguay) Cerro Corá	1–4	2–1
San Lorenzo (Argentina)	3–3 (4–2 p)	(Argentina) Lanús	1–1	2–2
Oriente Petrolero (Bolivia)	1–9	Universidad de Chile	1–4	0–5

== Quarterfinals ==
Team 1	Agg.	Team 2	1st leg	2nd leg
São Paulo (Brazil)	3–1	(Peru) Sporting Cristal	3–1	0–0
Corinthians (Brazil)	11–2	(Venezuela) Minervén	6–0	5–2
Peñarol (Uruguay)	7–4	(Paraguay) Cerro Corá	1–3	6–1
Universidad de Chile	3–2	(Argentina) San Lorenzo	0–1	3–1

== Semifinals ==
Team 1	Agg.	Team 2	1st leg	2nd leg
São Paulo (Brazil)	6–6 (5–4 p)	(Brazil) Corinthians	4–3	2–3
Peñarol (Uruguay)	3–1	Universidad de Chile	2–0	1–1

== Finals ==
Team 1	Agg.	Team 2	1st leg	2nd leg
São Paulo (Brazil)	6–4	(Uruguay) Peñarol	6–1	0–3
