= 1993 Copa CONMEBOL =

Tournament details
- Teams: 16 (from 8 confederations)

Final positions
- Champions: (Brazil) Botafogo (1st title)
- Runners-up: (Uruguay) Peñarol

Tournament statistics
- Matches played: 30
- Top scorer: (Brazil) Sinval (8)

The 1993 Copa CONMEBOL was the second edition of CONMEBOL's annual club tournament. Teams that failed to qualify for the Copa Libertadores played in this tournament. Sixteen teams from eight South American football confederations qualified for this tournament. Colombia and Bolivia sent no representatives. Botafogo defeated Peñarol in the finals.

== Teams ==
The following 16 teams from the 8 CONMEBOL member associations qualified for the tournament:

- 1992 Copa CONMEBOL champions
- Brazil: 4 berths
- Argentina: 3 berths
- Uruguay: 2 berths
- Venezuela: 2 berths
- All other associations: 1 berth each

| Association | Team (Berth) | Qualification method |
|---|---|---|
| Argentina (3 berths) | San Lorenzo | 1992–93 Primera División best team not participating in either the 1993 Supercopa Sudamericana or the 1994 Copa Libertadores |
| Argentina (3 berths) | Huracán | 1992–93 Primera División 2nd best team not participating in either the 1993 Supercopa Sudamericana or the 1994 Copa Libertadores |
| Argentina (3 berths) | Deportivo Español | 1992–93 Primera División 3rd best team not yet qualified not participating in either the 1993 Supercopa Sudamericana or the 1994 Copa Libertadores |
| Brazil (5 berths) | Atlético Mineiro | 1992 Copa CONMEBOL champions |
| Brazil (5 berths) | Botafogo | 1992 Campeonato Brasileiro Série A runners-up |
| Brazil (5 berths) | Vasco da Gama | 1992 Campeonato Brasileiro Série A 3rd place |
| Brazil (5 berths) | Bragantino | 1992 Campeonato Brasileiro Série A 4th place |
| Brazil (5 berths) | Fluminense | 1992 Copa do Brasil runners-up |
| Chile (1 berth) | Colo-Colo | 1993 Copa CONMEBOL play-off winners |
| Ecuador (1 berth) | Emelec | 1992 Serie A 3rd place |
| Paraguay (1 berths) | Sportivo Luqueño | 1992 Primera División semifinalist |
| Peru (1 berth) | Deportivo Sipesa | 1992 Liguilla Pre-Libertadores runners-up |
| Uruguay (2 berths) | Danubio | 1992 Liguilla Pre-Libertadores 3rd place |
| Uruguay (2 berths) | Peñarol | 1992 Liguilla Pre-Libertadores 4th place |
| Venezuela (2 berths) | Caracas | 1992–93 Primera División 3rd place |
| Venezuela (2 berths) | Unión Atlético Táchira | 1992–93 Primera División 4th place |

== Bracket ==
First round
(Brazil) Fluminense | 0 | 2 | 2 (2)
(Brazil) Atlético Mineiro | 2 | 0 | 2 (4)
(Peru) Deportivo Sipesa | 0 | 3 | 3 (4)
(Ecuador) Emelec | 1 | 2 | 3 (3)
(Brazil) Botafogo | 3 | 3 | 6
(Brazil) Bragantino | 1 | 2 | 3
(Venezuela) Caracas | 1 | 1 | 2
(Venezuela) Unión Atlético Táchira | 0 | 0 | 0
(Argentina) Huracán | 0 | 1 | 1
(Uruguay) Peñarol | 1 | 1 | 2
(Brazil) Vasco da Gama | 2 | 0 | 2 (2)
(Chile) Colo-Colo | 0 | 2 | 2 (4)
(Uruguay) Danubio | 0 | 0 | 0
(Argentina) San Lorenzo | 0 | 2 | 2
(Argentina) Deportivo Español | 1 | 1 | 2
(Paraguay) Sportivo Luqueño | 1 | 2 | 3

Quarterfinals
(Brazil) Atlético Mineiro | 1 | 1 | 2
(Peru) Deportivo Sipesa | 1 | 0 | 1
(Brazil) Botafogo | 1 | 3 | 4
(Venezuela) Caracas | 0 | 0 | 0
(Uruguay) Peñarol | 2 | 0 | 2 (4)
(Chile) Colo-Colo | 0 | 2 | 2 (2)
(Argentina) San Lorenzo | 0 | 4 | 4 (4)
(Paraguay) Sportivo Luqueño | 3 | 1 | 4 (2)

Semifinals
(Brazil) Atlético Mineiro | 3 | 0 | 3
(Brazil) Botafogo | 1 | 3 | 4
(Uruguay) Peñarol | 1 | 1 | 2 (4)
(Argentina) San Lorenzo | 0 | 2 | 2 (2)

Finals
(Brazil) Botafogo | 1 | 2 | 3 (3)
(Uruguay) Peñarol | 1 | 2 | 3 (1)

== First round ==
| Team 1 | Agg. | Team 2 | 1st leg | 2nd leg |
|---|---|---|---|---|
| Atlético Mineiro (Brazil) | 2–2 (4–2 p) | (Brazil) Fluminense | 2–0 | 0–2 |
| Deportivo Sipesa (Peru) | 3–3 (4–3 p) | (Ecuador) Emelec | 0–1 | 3–2 |
| Botafogo (Brazil) | 6–3 | (Brazil) Bragantino | 3–1 | 3–2 |
| Caracas (Venezuela) | 2–0 | (Venezuela) Unión Atlético Táchira | 1–0 | 1–0 |
| Peñarol (Uruguay) | 2–1 | (Argentina) Huracán | 1–0 | 1–1 |
| Sportivo Luqueño (Paraguay) | 3–2 | (Argentina) Deportivo Español | 1–1 | 2–1 |
| Vasco da Gama (Brazil) | 2–2 (2–4 p) | (Chile) Colo-Colo | 2–0 | 0–2 |
| San Lorenzo (Argentina) | 2–0 | (Uruguay) Danubio | 0–0 | 2–0 |

== Quarterfinals ==
| Team 1 | Agg. | Team 2 | 1st leg | 2nd leg |
|---|---|---|---|---|
| Caracas (Venezuela) | 0–4 | (Brazil) Botafogo | 0–1 | 0–3 |
| Atlético Mineiro (Brazil) | 2–1 | (Peru) Deportivo Sipesa | 1–1 | 1–0 |
| Peñarol (Uruguay) | 2–2 (4–2 p) | (Chile) Colo-Colo | 2–0 | 0–2 |
| San Lorenzo (Argentina) | 4–4 (4–2 p) | (Paraguay) Sportivo Luqueño | 0–3 | 4–1 |

== Semifinals ==
| Team 1 | Agg. | Team 2 | 1st leg | 2nd leg |
|---|---|---|---|---|
| Botafogo (Brazil) | 4–3 | (Brazil) Atlético Mineiro | 1–3 | 3–0 |
| San Lorenzo (Argentina) | 2–2 (4–2 p) | (Uruguay) Peñarol | 0–1 | 2–1 |

== Finals ==
| Team 1 | Agg. | Team 2 | 1st leg | 2nd leg |
|---|---|---|---|---|
| Botafogo (Brazil) | 3–3 (3–1 p) | (Uruguay) Peñarol | 1–1 | 2–2 |

== Top Scorer ==
(Brazil) Sinval (8 goals)
