= Francisco Beltrão =

- Municipality
- Municipality of Francisco Beltrão
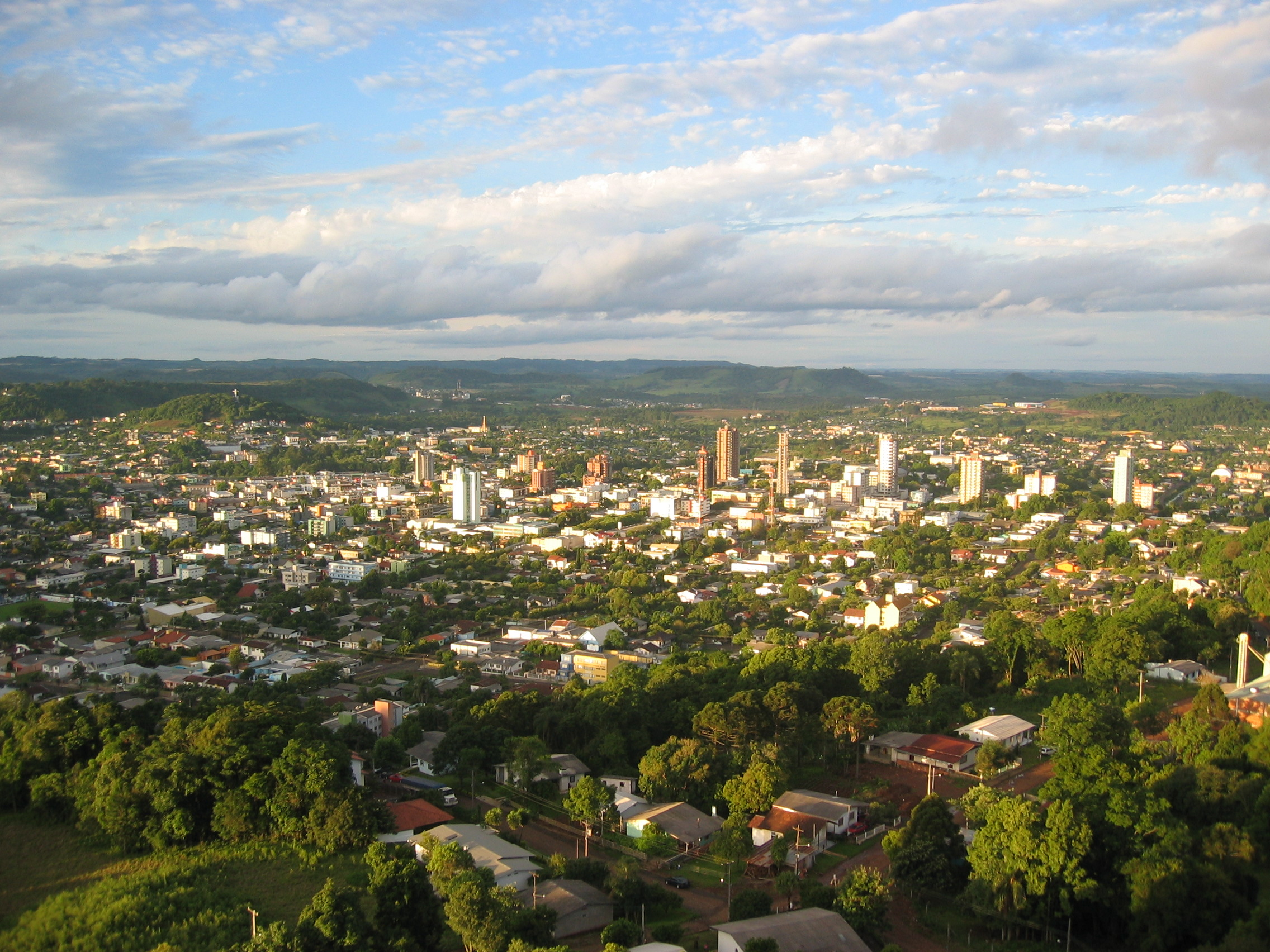
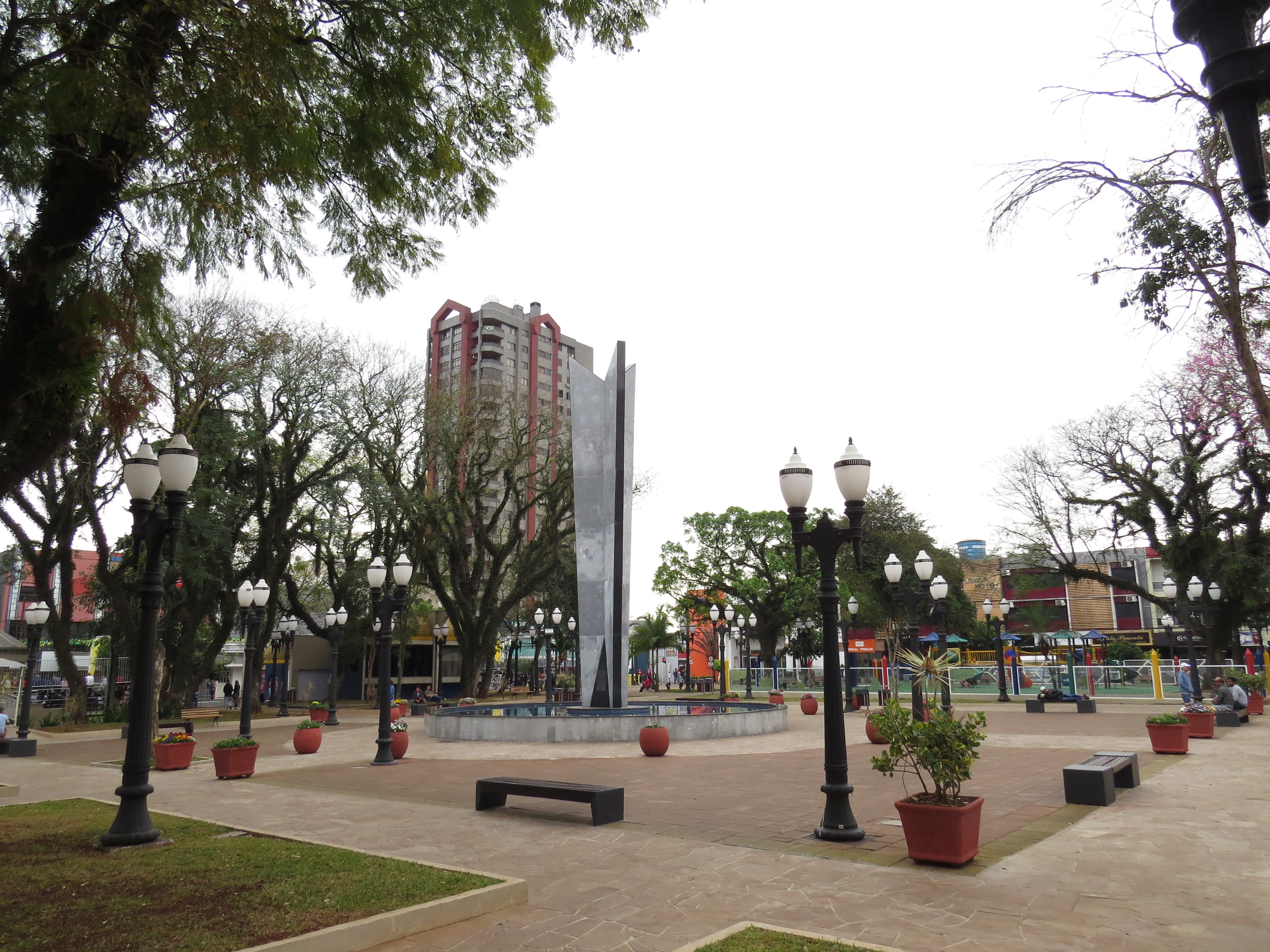
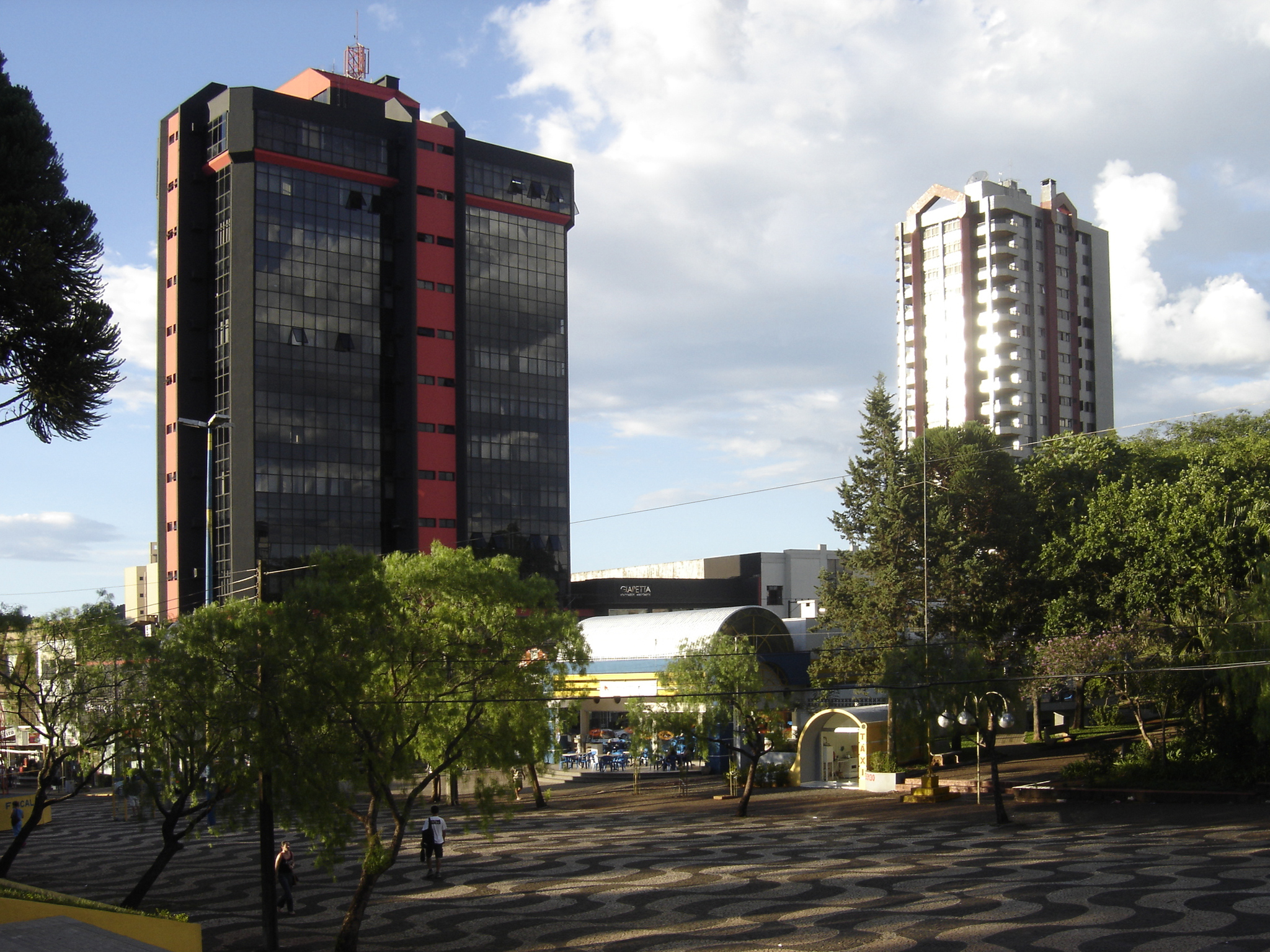
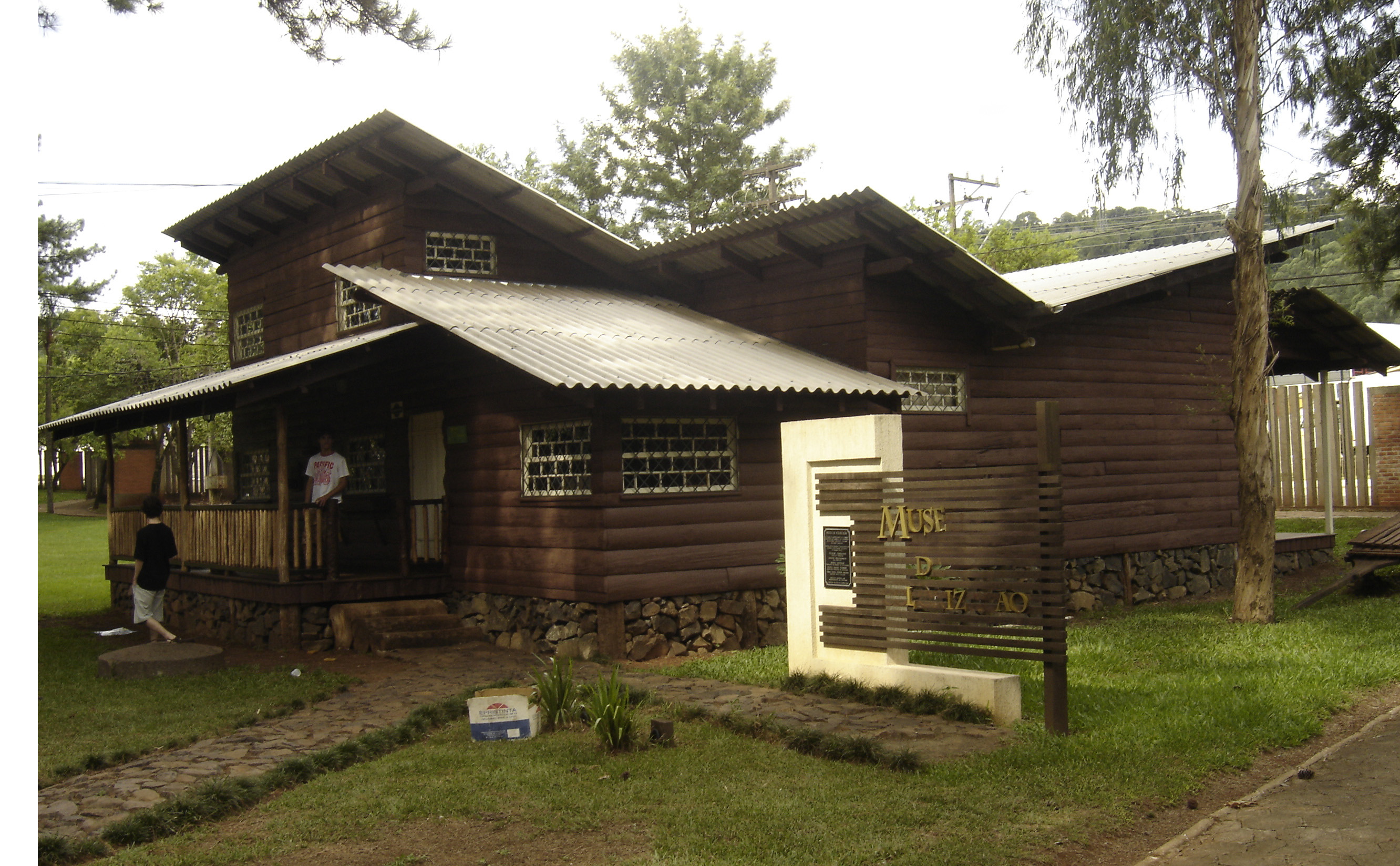
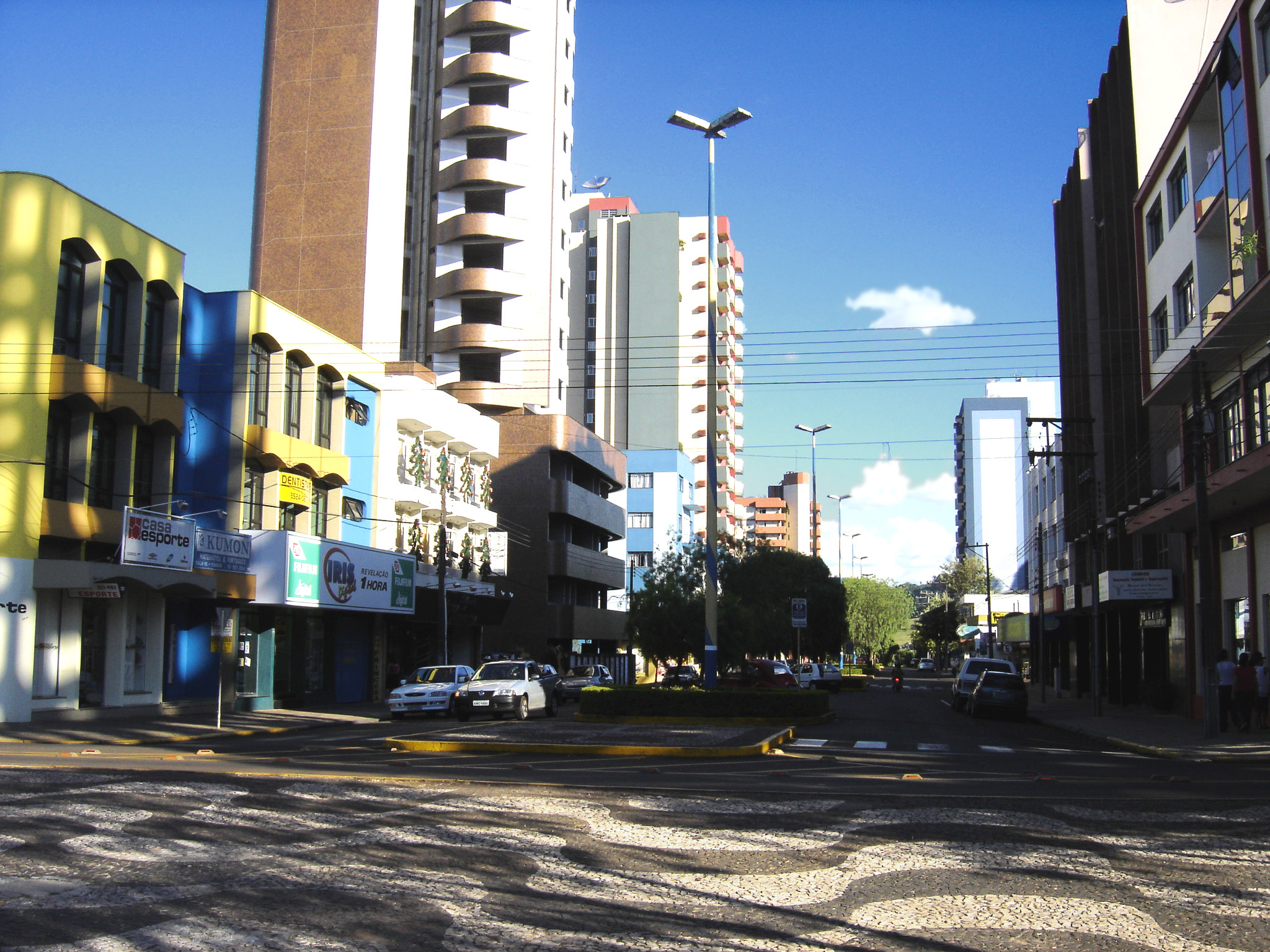
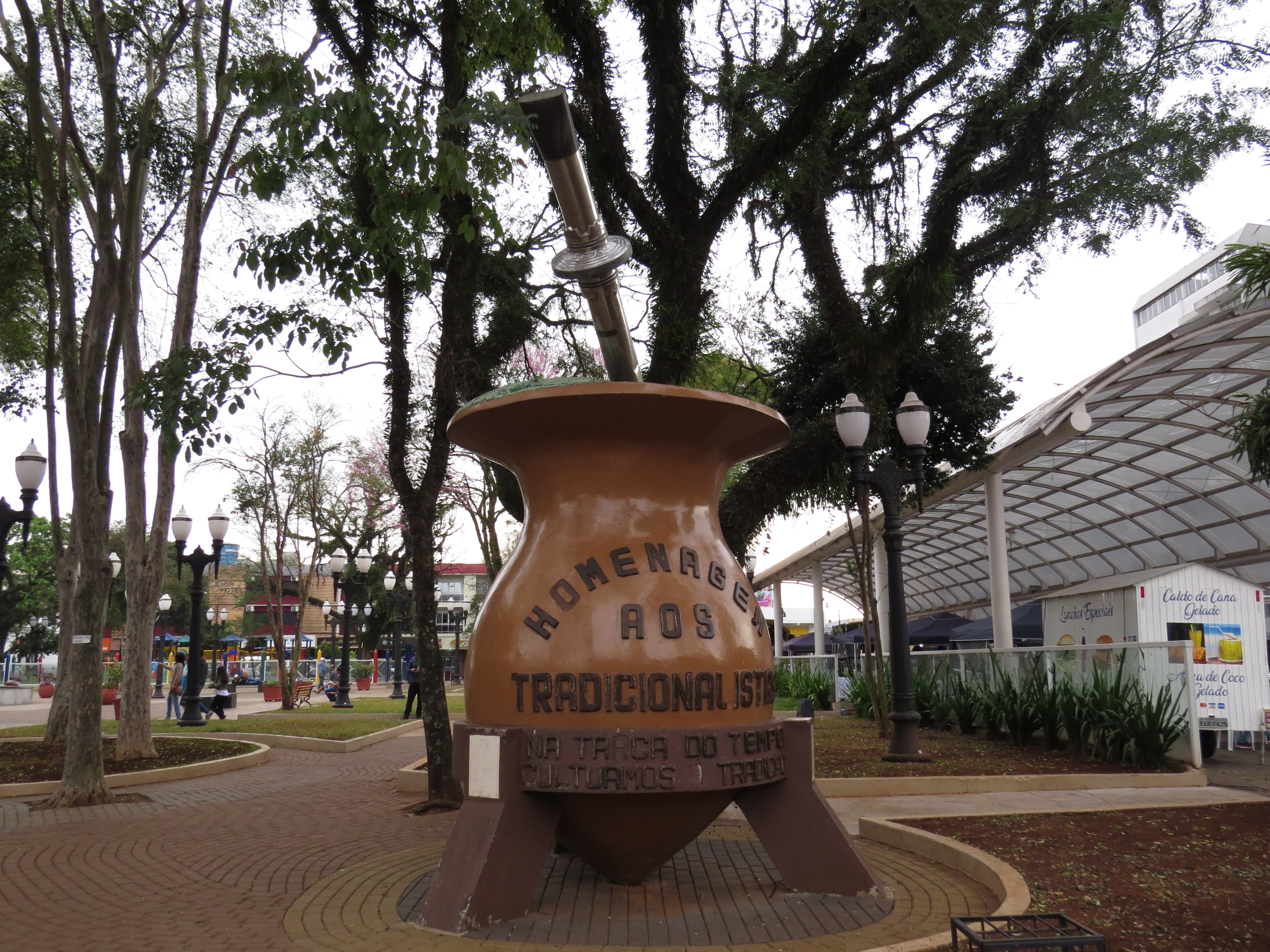
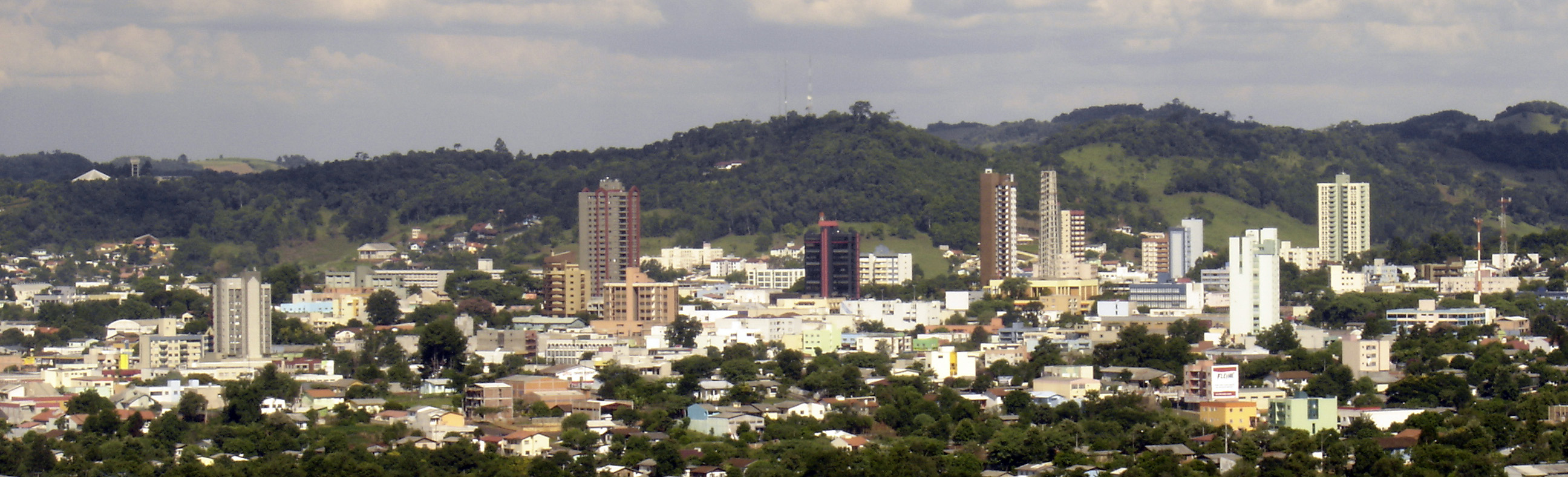

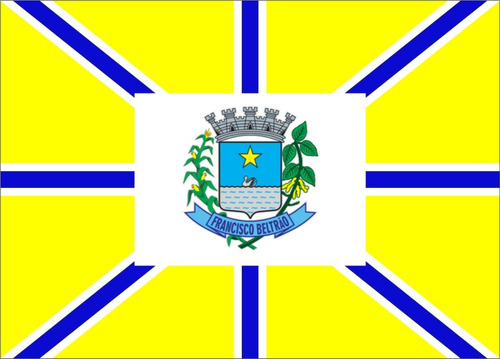
- Flag

- Location in Paraná

- Location within Brazil
- Coordinates: 26°05′S 53°03′W
- Country: Brazil
- State: Paraná

Government
  - Mayor: Cleber Fontana (PSDB)

Area
  - Total: 731 km^{2} (282 sq mi)
- Elevation: 650 m (2,130 ft)

Population (2022 Census)
  - Total: 96,666
  - Estimate (2025): 102,312
  - Density: 132/km^{2} (342/sq mi)
- Time zone: UTC-3 (UTC)
- HDI (2010): 0.774 – high
- Website: franciscobeltrao.pr.gov.br

Francisco Beltrão, established on December 14, 1952, is a municipality in the state of Paraná in Brazil. In 2010, the population was 80,727, of which 85% lived in the city proper and 15% on the surrounding land. Francisco Beltrão is very close to two other cities, Marmeleiro and Renascença. Its economy is based on agriculture, corn crops, turkey and chicken meat exports, textiles, aluminium pans, mobile industries, public services and small commerce. The population, according to the 2022 IBGE Census was 96,666 and in 2025 the estimate was 102,312.

== Brief ==
Francisco Beltrão is in the center of the southwest region of Paraná state, which encompasses about 500,000 inhabitants in a 20,000 square kilometer (about 7,700 square mile) area, nearly 5% of the whole state's population and 10% of the entire state's area. Most of the town's surrounding population resides in small agriculture-based villages and towns with only low-level services, leading to them often having to utilize services in the main regional settlement, thus concentrating a large number of the region's economic activities in Francisco Beltrão.

Paulo Abdala Airport serves the city.

== Geography ==
Francisco Beltrão is located in the third parana's highland. The downtown elevation is around 550 meters while the surrounding area rises as high 950 m, causing the city to take on a bowl shape. Several rivers run through this area, the most important being the "Rio Marrecas", where the first settlement was established about 1950.

=== Climate ===
Köppen-Geiger climate classification system classifies its climate as humid subtropical (Cfa).

The weather is warm most of the year with occasional hot days in the summer when temperatures reach over 32 °C (90 °F) in the hottest days. The average high temperature is 30 °C (86 °F) with lows around 18 °C (64 °F). Summer winds are calm, causing the heat index to be high.

The average winter low is 8 °C (46 °F), with temperatures falling below the freezing point for up to ten days per year. With highs around 20 °C (68 °F), the winds are a bit stronger than in the summer. During nights of calm wind, the bowl-like shape of the city causes the cold air to descend in the city's center, causing the temperatures to decline much more than in the surrounding areas. However, as soon as the sun rises, this effect quickly vanishes.

The lowest recorded temperature was in July 2000 at −5 °C (23 °F). The highest was in November 1985 at 38 °C (100 °F). Snow is rare, appearing once or twice every ten years (the four most recent snows were in July 2007, July 1975, July 1965, and July 1955). Freezes are more common and occur throughout the winter, for up to 20 days a year.

The average rainfall is high, at around 2,000 mm (79 in) per year.

Climate data for Francisco Beltrão, elevation 650 m (2,130 ft), (1974–2014)
Month	Jan	Feb	Mar	Apr	May	Jun	Jul	Aug	Sep	Oct	Nov	Dec	Year
Record high °C (°F)	36.4 (97.5)	37.6 (99.7)	37.4 (99.3)	33.8 (92.8)	31.9 (89.4)	31.0 (87.8)	30.0 (86.0)	34.0 (93.2)	35.7 (96.3)	36.4 (97.5)	38.3 (100.9)	38.2 (100.8)	38.3 (100.9)
Mean daily maximum °C (°F)	30.2 (86.4)	29.9 (85.8)	29.2 (84.6)	26.1 (79.0)	22.3 (72.1)	20.7 (69.3)	21.1 (70.0)	23.4 (74.1)	24.3 (75.7)	26.7 (80.1)	28.4 (83.1)	29.7 (85.5)	26.0 (78.8)
Daily mean °C (°F)	23.6 (74.5)	23.2 (73.8)	22.2 (72.0)	19.2 (66.6)	15.5 (59.9)	14.1 (57.4)	14.2 (57.6)	16.0 (60.8)	17.5 (63.5)	20.1 (68.2)	21.7 (71.1)	23.1 (73.6)	19.2 (66.6)
Mean daily minimum °C (°F)	18.4 (65.1)	18.3 (64.9)	17.0 (62.6)	14.1 (57.4)	10.6 (51.1)	9.4 (48.9)	9.0 (48.2)	10.2 (50.4)	11.9 (53.4)	14.6 (58.3)	15.9 (60.6)	17.7 (63.9)	13.9 (57.1)
Record low °C (°F)	8.0 (46.4)	8.7 (47.7)	3.4 (38.1)	1.0 (33.8)	−0.2 (31.6)	−4.2 (24.4)	−5.0 (23.0)	−2.4 (27.7)	−0.4 (31.3)	3.3 (37.9)	4.8 (40.6)	8.6 (47.5)	−5.0 (23.0)
Average precipitation mm (inches)	186.8 (7.35)	171.1 (6.74)	137.9 (5.43)	171.4 (6.75)	184.5 (7.26)	170.6 (6.72)	135.1 (5.32)	110.5 (4.35)	167.9 (6.61)	254.8 (10.03)	174.8 (6.88)	168.2 (6.62)	2,033.6 (80.06)
Average precipitation days (≥ 1.0 mm)	14	13	11	10	9	10	10	8	11	12	11	12	131
Average relative humidity (%)	74	76	76	78	80	81	77	71	70	71	69	71	75
Mean monthly sunshine hours	219.7	192.9	215.5	188.6	172.3	144.9	172.9	192.8	180.6	201.6	224.3	225.7	2,331.8
Source: IAPAR

== Economy ==
Since 2000, the GDP has growth over 7.5% annually. Unemployment has dropped from 11% of its 35,000 economically active people to somewhat over 6% as of 2006.

For the last three years, the city was proportionally ranked first (and generally no lower than fifth) in job-creation throughout the state of Paraná.

== Culture ==
Most inhabitants are descendants of Italian and German immigrants, who first lived in the southern states of Rio Grande do Sul and Santa Catarina before coming to the region between the 1940s and the 1960s. According to some researchers, 50% of population descends from Italian immigrants while 15% are descendants of German immigrants. These proportions are likely to decrease as young people move around Brazil and northern Brazilian residents move to this city.

== See also ==
- List of municipalities in Paraná
