= 1993 São Paulo FC season =

São Paulo
1993 season
- Chairman: José Eduardo Mesquita Pimenta
- Manager: Telê Santana; Márcio Araújo (at Copa do Brasil)
- Campeonato Brasileiro: 4th (in 1994 Copa CONMEBOL)
- Intercontinental Cup: Champions (2nd title)
- Copa Libertadores: Champions (2nd title) (in 1994 Copa Libertadores, 1993 Supercopa Libertadores and 1994 Recopa Sudamericana)
- Recopa Sudamericana: Champions (1st title)
- Supercopa Sudamericana: Champions (1st title)
- Copa de Oro: Semifinals
- Copa do Brasil: Quarterfinals
- Campeonato Paulista: Second stage
- Top goalscorer: League: Palhinha (7); All: Palhinha and Raí (22)
Home colours	Away colours

The 1993 season was São Paulo's 64th season in the club's existence.

== Statistics ==
=== Scorers ===
Position	Nation	Playing position	Name	Campeonato Paulista	Copa do Brasil	Copa Libertadores	Copa de Oro	Campeonato Brasileiro	Recopa Sudamericana	Supercopa Sudamericana	Intercontinental Cup	Others	Total
1	(Brazil)	FW	Palhinha	11	0	1	0	7	0	1	1	1	22
=	(Brazil)	MF	Raí	13	0	4	0	0	0	0	0	5	22
2	(Brazil)	DF	Cafu	15	0	2	0	1	0	1	0	1	20
3	(Brazil)	FW	Müller	7	0	2	0	3	0	1	1	1	15
4	(Brazil)	FW	Catê	6	0	0	0	0	0	0	0	2	8
=	(Brazil)	MF	Dinho	1	0	1	0	3	0	1	0	2	8
5	(Brazil)	FW	Cláudio Moura	1	3	0	0	0	0	0	0	3	7
=	(Brazil)	FW	Guilherme	0	0	0	0	2	0	0	0	5	7
6	(Uruguay)	MF	Gustavo Matosas	0	0	0	1	2	0	0	0	2	5
=	(Brazil)	MF	Leonardo	0	0	0	0	3	0	2	0	0	5
7	(Brazil)	MF	André Luiz	3	0	0	0	1	0	0	0	0	4
=	(Brazil)	MF	Valdeir	0	0	0	0	2	0	2	0	0	4
8	(Brazil)	MF	Carlos Alberto	1	2	0	0	0	0	0	0	0	3
=	(Brazil)	FW	Jamelli	1	0	0	0	0	0	0	0	2	3
=	(Brazil)	MF	Juninho	0	0	0	0	1	0	2	0	0	3
=	(Brazil)	DF	Ronaldão	0	0	0	0	0	0	0	0	3	3
=	(Brazil)	MF	Toninho Cerezo	0	0	0	0	1	0	1	1	0	3
=	(Brazil)	DF	Vaguinho	2	1	0	0	0	0	0	0	0	3
9	(Brazil)	MF	Elivélton	1	1	0	0	0	0	0	0	0	2
=	(Brazil)	DF	Gilmar	0	1	1	0	0	0	0	0	0	2
=	(Brazil)	DF	Lula	1	0	0	0	0	0	0	0	1	2
=	(Brazil)	MF	Pintado	2	0	0	0	0	0	0	0	0	2
10	(Brazil)	MF	Anílton	0	1	0	0	0	0	0	0	0	1
=	(Brazil)	MF	Douglas	0	1	0	0	0	0	0	0	0	1
=	(Brazil)	DF	Jura	0	0	0	0	1	0	0	0	0	1
=	(Brazil)	MF	Robertinho	0	1	0	0	0	0	0	0	0	1
=	(Brazil)	DF	Ronaldo Luiz	0	0	0	0	0	0	0	0	1	1
=	(Brazil)	DF	Válber	1	0	0	0	0	0	0	0	0	1
=	(Brazil)	DF	Vítor	0	0	1	0	0	0	0	0	0	1
			Own goals	1	0	1	0	0	0	1	0	0	3
			Total	67	11	13	1	27	0	12	3	29	163

=== Managers performance ===
Name	Nationality	From	To	P	W	D	L	GF	GA	%
Valdir Joaquim de Moraes (assistant)	Brazil	24 January	25 April	4	2	1	1	7	4	62%
Telê Santana	Brazil	4 February	12 December	85	42	24	19	115	78	63%
Márcio Araújo (assistant)	Brazil	6 April	27 June	8	3	3	2	17	13	56%

=== Overall ===
Games played	98 (36 Campeonato Paulista, 6 Copa do Brasil, 8 Copa Libertadores, 2 Copa de Oro, 20 Campeonato Brasileiro, 2 Recopa Sudamericana, 8 Supercopa Sudamericana, 1 Intercontinental Cup, 15 Friendly match)
Games won	46 (20 Campeonato Paulista, 2 Copa do Brasil, 4 Copa Libertadores, 0 Copa de Oro, 9 Campeonato Brasileiro, 0 Recopa Sudamericana, 2 Supercopa Sudamericana, 1 Intercontinental Cup, 8 Friendly match)
Games drawn	30 (7 Campeonato Paulista, 2 Copa do Brasil, 2 Copa Libertadores, 1 Copa de Oro, 8 Campeonato Brasileiro, 2 Recopa Sudamericana, 5 Supercopa Sudamericana, 0 Intercontinental Cup, 3 Friendly match)
Games lost	22 (9 Campeonato Paulista, 2 Copa do Brasil, 2 Copa Libertadores, 1 Copa de Oro, 3 Campeonato Brasileiro, 0 Recopa Sudamericana, 1 Supercopa Sudamericana, 0 Intercontinental Cup, 4 Friendly match)
Goals scored	163
Goals conceded	95
Goal difference	+68
Best result	6–1 (H) v Noroeste – Campeonato Paulista – 1993.03.04; 6–1 (H) v Santos – Campeonato Paulista – 1993.06.03
Worst result	1–3 (A) v Albacete – Friendly match – 1993.08.18
Top scorer	Palhinha and Raí (22)

Source: São Paulo FC

== Friendlies ==
January 24 National	Santa Cruz (Brazil)	2–4	(Brazil) São Paulo	Recife
	Marcelo 3', 45'		Cafu 27'; Dinho 36'; Müller 43'; Raí 52'	Stadium: Estádio do Arruda

March 27 International	São Paulo (Brazil)	2–0	(Spain) Sevilla	São Paulo
	Raí 31', 82'			Stadium: Estádio do Morumbi; Attendance: 47,095; Referee: Ilton José da Costa

=== Torneo Ciudad de Santiago ===
February 12 Friendly tournament	Universidad de Chile	0–2	(Brazil) São Paulo	Santiago
			Raí 5', 51'	Stadium: Estadio Nacional; Attendance: 22,413; Referee: Enrique Marin

February 14 Friendly tournament	Universidad Católica (Chile)	0–3	(Brazil) São Paulo	Santiago
			Palhinha 10'; Ronaldo Luís 18'; Cláudio Moura 39'	Stadium: Estadio Nacional; Attendance: 8,842; Referee: Enrique Marin

=== Troféo Santiago de Compostela ===
June 25 Friendly tournament	Tenerife (Spain)	1–4	(Brazil) São Paulo	Santiago de Compostela
	Dertycia		Guilherme	Stadium: Estadio Multiusos de San Lázaro

June 27 Friendly tournament	River Plate (Argentina)	2–2 (3–4 p)	(Brazil) São Paulo	Santiago de Compostela
	Rivarola 15'; Silvani 46'		Guilherme 65'; Catê 80'	Stadium: Estadio Multiusos de San Lázaro

=== Los Angeles City Tournament ===
August 7 Friendly tournament	América (Mexico)	3–4	(Brazil) São Paulo	Los Angeles
	Martelotto 44', 87'; Barticciotto 58'		Matosas 19', 32'; Ronaldão 82'; Dinho 89'	Stadium: Los Angeles Coliseum; Attendance: 12,000

=== Torneo Jalisco ===
August 9 Friendly tournament	Guadalajara (Mexico)	1–1 (6–7 p)	(Brazil) São Paulo	Guadalajara
	Espinosa		Ronaldão 90'	Stadium: Estadio Jalisco

=== Troféo Teresa Herrera ===
August 13 Friendly tournament	Lazio (Italy)	1–3	(Brazil) São Paulo	A Coruña
	Signori 3'		Lula 18'; Catê 54'; Jamelli 87'	Stadium: Estadio Municipal de Riazor; Referee: Fernandes Marin

August 14 Friendly tournament	Barcelona (Spain)	1–0	(Brazil) São Paulo	A Coruña
	Romário 18'			Stadium: Estadio Municipal de Riazor; Referee: Garcia Losa

=== Troféo Ciudad de Albacete ===
August 18 Friendly tournament	Albacete (Spain)	3–1	(Brazil) São Paulo	Albacete
	Fradera 12'; Gilmar 25' (o.g.) dos Santos 50'		Cláudio Moura 54'	Stadium: Carlos Belmonte; Referee: Panadero Martinez

=== Troféo Colombino ===
August 21 Friendly tournament	Sampdoria (Italy)	1–1 (4–3 p)	(Brazil) São Paulo	Huelva
	Platt 89'		Ronaldão 74'	Stadium: Estadio Colombino; Referee: Caetano Bueno

August 22 Friendly tournament	Sevilla (Spain)	0–1	(Brazil) São Paulo	Huelva
			Cláudio Moura 25'	Stadium: Estadio Colombino

=== Troféo Ramón de Carranza ===
August 28 Friendly tournament	Palmeiras (Brazil)	2–1	(Brazil) São Paulo	Cádiz
	Jean Carlo 52'; Maurílio 88'		Jamelli 1'	Stadium: Estadio Ramón de Carranza; Referee: Andújar Oliver

August 29 Friendly tournament	Atlético Madrid (Spain)	2–0	(Brazil) São Paulo	Cádiz
	Benítez 32'; Kiko 85'			Stadium: Estadio Ramón de Carranza

== Official competitions ==
=== Campeonato Paulista ===
==== League table ====
Pos	Team	Pld	W	D	L	GF	GA	GD	Pts	Qualification or relegation
1	Palmeiras	30	19	6	5	53	27	+26	44	Qualified
2	São Paulo	30	16	7	7	53	24	+29	39	Qualified
3	Corinthians	30	16	7	7	59	34	+25	39	Qualified
4	Santos	30	16	7	7	55	41	+14	39	Qualified
5	Guarani	30	15	6	9	41	41	0	36	Qualified
6	Rio Branco	30	13	10	7	43	32	+11	36	Qualified
7	Mogi Mirim	30	11	14	5	43	32	+11	36	
8	União São João	30	12	11	7	45	35	+10	35	

Updated to match(es) played on 9 May 1993. Source: RSSSF.com
Rules for classification: 1) points; 2) wins; 3) goal difference; 4) number of goals scored.

===== Matches =====
January 27 1	São Paulo	2–0	Ponte Preta	São Paulo
	Cafu 45', 75'			Stadium: Morumbi; Referee: Dagoberto Teixeira

January 31 2	Portuguesa	1–1	São Paulo	São Paulo
	Éder 70'		Raí 27'	Stadium: Canindé; Attendance: 5,464; Referee: Oscar Roberto Godói

February 4 3	Mogi Mirim	2–2	São Paulo	Mogi Mirim
	Marcão 53'; Polaco 58'		Raí 48'; Lula 57'	Stadium: Estádio Wilson Fernandes; Attendance: 4,021; Referee: Joaquim Caetano

February 7 4	São Paulo	3–0	Corinthians	São Paulo
	Raí 17', 58'; Dinho 85'			Stadium: Pacaembu; Attendance: 21,157; Referee: João Paulo Araújo

February 10 5	União São João	1–0	São Paulo	Araras
	Alexandre 78'			Stadium: Estádio Hemínio Ometto; Attendance: 7,388; Referee: Antônio Sales

February 20 6	Guarani	3–2	São Paulo	Campinas
	Edu Lima 41', 90'; Pael 84'		Palhinha 5'; Cafu 48'	Stadium: Estádio Brinco de Ouro; Attendance: 9,445; Referee: Dionísio Domingos

February 25 7	São Paulo	1–0	Ituano	São Paulo
	Raí 14'			Stadium: Morumbi; Attendance: 4,370; Referee: Ulisses Tavares

February 28 8	São Paulo	2–0	Bragantino	São Paulo
	Palhinha 53'; Raí 66'			Stadium: Morumbi; Referee: José de Oliveira

March 2 9	São Paulo	5–1	Juventus	São Paulo
	Raí 14'; Müller 34'; Palhinha 42'; Cafu 54', 56'		Neto 62'	Stadium: Morumbi; Attendance: 3,412; Referee: Joaquim Caetano

March 4 10	São Paulo	6–1	Noroeste	São Paulo
	Pintado 15'; Cafu 28'; Palhinha 30'; Müller 31'; Raí 76'; Vaguinho 84'		Chiquinho 16'	Stadium: Morumbi; Attendance: 2,176; Referee: Roberto Perasi

March 7 11	São Paulo	1–0	Santos	São Paulo
	Cafu 56'			Stadium: Morumbi; Attendance: 39,965; Referee: Márcio Rezende

March 9 12	Rio Branco	1–0	São Paulo	Americana
	Edmar 74'			Stadium: Décio Vitta; Attendance: 19,173; Referee: Oscar Roberto Godói

March 11 13	XV de Piracicaba	1–3	São Paulo	Piracicaba
	Dicão 38'		Cafu 23', 37'; Palhinha 79'	Stadium: Estádio Barão da Serra Negra; Attendance: 19,987; Referee: Flávio de Carvalho

March 14 14	Palmeiras	0–0	São Paulo	São Paulo
				Stadium: Morumbi; Attendance: 96,340; Referee: Dionísio Domingos

March 19 15	Marília	2–2	São Paulo	Marília
	Guilherme 42'; Vlademir 88'		Elivélton 41'; André Luiz 73'	Stadium: Bento de Abreu; Attendance: 12,754; Referee: Dagoberto Teixeira

March 21 16	São Paulo	0–2	XV de Piracicaba	São Paulo
			Celso Luiz 55', 77'	Stadium: Canindé; Attendance: 9,118; Referee: Luís dos Santos

March 25 17	Noroeste	0–3	São Paulo	Bauru
			Catê 46'; Raí 78'; Cafu 82'	Stadium: Alfredo de Castilho; Attendance: 9,112; Referee: Oscar Roberto Godói

March 29 18	Ponte Preta	1–1	São Paulo	Campinas
	Alberto 90'		Catê 86'	Stadium: Moisés Lucarelli; Referee: Ulisses Tavares

March 31 19	São Paulo	3–0	Juventus	São Paulo
	André Luiz 68'; Cafu 85'; Catê 88'			Stadium: Pacaembu; Attendance: 4,690; Referee: Silas Santana

April 4 20	Corinthians	0–2	São Paulo	São Paulo
			Válber 24'; André Luiz 83'	Stadium: Morumbi; Attendance: 69,473; Referee: Oscar Roberto de Godói

April 9 21	São Paulo	2–0	Guarani	São Paulo
	Cafu 1'; Müller 64'			Stadium: Morumbi; Attendance: 7,947; Referee: Dionísio Domingos

April 11 22	São Paulo	2–1	Marília	São Paulo
	Cafu 19'; Catê 73'		Guilherme 43'	Stadium: Morumbi; Attendance: 5,588; Referee: Marco Spironelli

April 16 23	Ituano	2–1	São Paulo	Itu
	Neguinho 34'; Romeu 58'		Carlos Alberto 22'	Stadium: Novelli Júnior; Attendance: 5,891; Referee: Antônio Salles

April 18 24	São Paulo	2–0	Palmeiras	São Paulo
	Raí 19'; Roberto Carlos 73' (o.g.)			Stadium: Morumbi; Attendance: 51,319; Referee: José de Oliveira

April 23 25	São Paulo	1–1	União São João	São Paulo
	Catê 4'		Glauco 53'	Stadium: Morumbi; Attendance: 1,629; Referee: Dionísio Domingos

April 25 26	Santos	1–0	São Paulo	Santos
	Ranielli 83'			Stadium: Vila Belmiro; Attendance: 18,000; Referee: João de Araújo

April 30 27	São Paulo	1–1	Mogi Mirim	São Paulo
	Cláudio Moura 15'		Rivaldo 73'	Stadium: Morumbi; Attendance: 2,044; Referee: Flávio de Carvalho

May 2 28	Bragantino	1–2	São Paulo	Bragança Paulista
	Marco Aurélio 64'		Palhinha 19'; Müller 55'	Stadium: Estádio Marcelo Stéfani; Attendance: 6,007; Referee: Silas Santana

May 7 29	São Paulo	0–1	Rio Branco	São Paulo
			Mazinho 18'	Stadium: Morumbi; Attendance: 1,451; Referee: José de Oliveira

May 9 30	São Paulo	3–0	Portuguesa	São Paulo
	Cafu 25'; Vaguinho 40'; Jamelli 90'			Stadium: Morumbi; Attendance: 5,713; Referee: Flávio de Carvalho

==== Second stage ====
Pos	Team	Pld	W	D	L	GF	GA	GD	Pts	Qualification or relegation
1	Corinthians	6	4	1	1	8	3	+5	9	Qualified
2	São Paulo	6	4	0	2	14	6	+8	8	
3	Santos	6	2	1	3	10	15	−5	5	
4	Novorizontino	6	1	0	5	6	14	−8	2	

Updated to match(es) played on 3 June 1993. Source: RSSSF.com
Rules for classification: 1) points; 2) wins; 3) goal difference; 4) number of goals scored.

===== Matches =====
May 15 Second stage 1	Novorizontino	0–1	São Paulo	Novo Horizonte
			Müller 67'	Stadium: Jorge Ismael de Biase; Referee: Oscar Roberto Godói

May 21 Second stage 2	Santos	3–2	São Paulo	São Paulo
	Ranielli 35'; Almir 49'; Cuca 65'		Raí 57'; Catê 76'	Stadium: Pacaembu; Attendance: 20,383; Referee: Flávio de Carvalho

May 23 Second stage 3	São Paulo	2–0	Corinthians	São Paulo
	Raí 50'; Palhinha 71'			Stadium: Morumbi; Attendance: 86,538; Referee: Dionísio Roberto Domingos

May 28 Second stage 4	São Paulo	3–1	Novorizontino	São Paulo
	Müller 7', 20'; Palhinha 11'		Sinval 52'	Stadium: Morumbi; Attendance: 13,558; Referee: Joaquim Caetano

May 30 Second stage 5	Corinthians	1–0	São Paulo	São Paulo
	Neto 66'			Stadium: Morumbi; Attendance: 28,675; Referee: José Aparecido de Oliveira

June 3 Second stage 6	São Paulo	6–1	Santos	São Paulo
	Palhinha 23', 58', 73'; Cafu 27'; Pintado 36'; Raí 80'		Guga 56'	Stadium: Morumbi; Attendance: 15,702; Referee: Oscar Roberto Godói

==== Record ====
Final Position	Points	Matches	Wins	Draws	Losses	Goals For	Goals Away	Win%
3rd	47	36	20	7	9	67	30	65%

=== Copa do Brasil ===
==== Round of 32 ====
6 April 1993	Sergipe	1–1	São Paulo	Aracajú
	Sandoval 41'		Gilmar 57'	Stadium: Batistão; Referee: Manoel Serapião

13 April 1993	São Paulo	4–3 (5–4 agg.)	Sergipe	São Paulo
	Anílton 5'; Robertinho 24'; Vaguinho 66'; Carlos Alberto 78'		Leníton 30', 31'; Osvaldo 69'	Stadium: Morumbi; Attendance: 748; Referee: Dalmo Bozzano

==== Eightfinals ====
20 April 1993	Rio Branco-AC	1–0	São Paulo	Rio Branco
	Ulisses 75'			Stadium: Estádio José de Melo

27 April 1993	São Paulo	3–1 (3–2 agg.)	Rio Branco-AC	São Paulo
	Cláudio Moura 5', 48'; Carlos Alberto 28'		Palmiro 63'	Stadium: Morumbi; Attendance: 840; Referee: Custódio Pereira

==== Quarterfinals ====
4 May 1993	São Paulo	1–2	Cruzeiro	São Paulo
	Cláudio Moura 23'		Toto 70'; Boiadeiro 72'	Stadium: Morumbi; Attendance: 2,435; Referee: Ivo Scatola

11 May 1993	Cruzeiro	2–2 (4–3 agg.)	São Paulo	Belo Horizonte
	Cleisson 43', 60'		Elivélton 51'; Douglas 62'	Stadium: Mineirão; Attendance: 36,044; Referee: Manoel Serapião Filho

==== Record ====
Final Position	Points	Matches	Wins	Draws	Losses	Goals For	Goals Away	Win%
8th	6	6	2	2	2	11	10	50%

=== Copa Libertadores ===
==== Eightfinals ====
7 April 1993	Newell's Old Boys (Argentina)	2–0	(Brazil) São Paulo	Rosario
	Cozzoni 20'; Mendoza 35'			Stadium: Estadio Monumental de Rosario; Attendance: 30,000; Referee: Juan Escobar

14 April 1993	São Paulo (Brazil)	4–0 (4–2 agg.)	(Argentina) Newell's Old Boys	São Paulo
	Dinho 29'; Raí 38', 75'; Cafu 83'			Stadium: Estádio do Morumbi; Attendance: 31,931; Referee: Ernesto Filipi

==== Quarterfinals ====
21 April 1993	Flamengo (Brazil)	1–1	(Brazil) São Paulo	Rio de Janeiro
	Nélio 51'		Palhinha 42'	Stadium: Estádio do Maracanã; Attendance: 60,010; Referee: Manuel Serapião Filho

28 April 1993	São Paulo (Brazil)	2–0 (3–1 agg.)	(Brazil) Flamengo	São Paulo
	Müller 24'; Cafu 68'			Stadium: Estádio do Morumbi; Attendance: 97,831; Referee: Renato Marsiglia

==== Semifinals ====
5 May 1993	São Paulo (Brazil)	1–0	(Paraguay) Cerro Porteño	São Paulo
	Raí 13'			Stadium: Morumbi; Attendance: 50,446; Referee: Jorge Nieves

12 May 1993	Cerro Porteño (Paraguay)	0–0 (0–1 agg.)	(Brazil) São Paulo	Asunción
				Stadium: Estadio Defensores del Chaco; Attendance: 35,000; Referee: Alberto Tejada

==== Finals ====
19 May 1993	São Paulo (Brazil)	5–1	(Chile) Universidad Católica	São Paulo
	Lopez 30' (o.g.); Vítor 40'; Gilmar 54'; Raí 60'; Müller 70'		Almada 85'	Stadium: Morumbi; Attendance: 94,629; Referee: José Torres Cadena

26 May 1993	Universidad Católica (Chile)	2–0 (3–5 agg.)	(Brazil) São Paulo	Santiago
	Lunari 9'; Almada 15' (pen.)			Stadium: Estadio Nacional; Attendance: 45,000; Referee: Juan Francisco Escobar

==== Record ====
Final Position	Points	Matches	Wins	Draws	Losses	Goals For	Goals Away	Win%
1st	10	8	4	2	2	13	6	62%

=== Copa de Oro ===
July 7 Semifinals	Boca Juniors (Argentina)	1–0	(Brazil) São Paulo	Buenos Aires
	Martínez 87'			Stadium: Estadio La Bombonera

July 10 Semifinals	São Paulo (Brazil)	1–1 (1–2 agg.)	(Argentina) Boca Juniors	São Paulo
	Matosas 73'		Martínez 91'	Stadium: Estádio do Pacaembu

==== Record ====
Final Position	Points	Matches	Wins	Draws	Losses	Goals For	Goals Away	Win%
4th	1	2	0	1	1	1	2	25%

=== Campeonato Brasileiro ===
==== League table ====
Pos	Team	Pld	W	D	L	GF	GA	GD	Pts	Qualification
1	Corinthians	14	10	4	0	27	8	+19	24	Qualified to second phase
2	São Paulo	14	5	7	2	19	12	+7	17	Qualified to second phase
3	Flamengo	14	6	4	4	17	16	+1	16	Qualified to second phase
4	Cruzeiro	14	6	2	6	22	15	+7	14	
5	Internacional	14	5	4	5	17	20	−3	14	

===== Matches =====
September 6 1	São Paulo	3–2	Internacional	São Paulo
	Matosas 21'; Dinho 70'; Jura 90'		Paulinho McLaren 43'; Wagner 44'	Stadium: Morumbi; Attendance: 10,788; Referee: Cláudio Vinícius Cerdeira

September 12 2	São Paulo	1–1	Corinthians	São Paulo
	Matosas 89'		Zé Elias 83'	Stadium: Morumbi; Attendance: 21,815; Referee: Silas Santana

September 18 3	São Paulo	2–0	Bahia	São Paulo
	Dinho 87'; Guilherme 89'			Stadium: Morumbi; Attendance: 7,034; Referee: Léo Feldman

September 22 4	Flamengo	2–0	São Paulo	Rio de Janeiro
	Casagrande 14'; Edu Lima 30'			Stadium: Maracanã; Attendance: 12,559; Referee: Dalmo Bozzano

September 26 5#	São Paulo	0–0	Cruzeiro	São Paulo
				Stadium: Morumbi; Attendance: 12,974; Referee: Renato Marsiglia
Note: Match valid simultaneously for CONMEBOL Recopa Sudamericana and for Campeonato Brasileiro.

October 3 6	Botafogo	0–4	São Paulo	Rio de Janeiro
			Toninho Cerezo 5'; Valdeir 51'; Palhinha 55', 75'	Stadium: Maracanã; Attendance: 5,937; Referee: Antônio Pereira da Silva

October 10 7	São Paulo	3–3	Bragantino	São Paulo
	Dinho 42'; Valdeir 49'; Palhinha 84'		João Santos 9'; Claudinho 38'; Silvio 40'	Stadium: Pacaembu; Attendance: 19,138; Referee: José Aparecido de Oliveira

October 16 8	Corinthians	1–0	São Paulo	São Paulo
	Simão 25'			Stadium: Pacaembu; Attendance: 27,615; Referee: João Paulo Araújo

October 23 9	Bragantino	0–0	São Paulo	Bragança Paulista
				Stadium: Marcelo Stéfani; Attendance: 5,806; Referee: Dionísio Roberto Domingos

October 30 10	Bahia	1–1	São Paulo	Aracajú
	Ramon 25'		Palhinha 54'	Stadium: Batistão; Attendance: 8,183; Referee: Antônio Pereira da Silva

November 5 11	Cruzeiro	1–1	São Paulo	Belo Horizonte
	Ronaldo 24'		Leonardo 10'	Stadium: Mineirão; Attendance: 18,115; Referee: Dalmo Bozzano

November 7 12	São Paulo	2–0	Flamengo	São Paulo
	Müller 70'; Palhinha 78'			Stadium: Morumbi; Attendance: 38,648; Referee: José Mocellin

November 12 13	Internacional	1–1	São Paulo	Porto Alegre
	Zinho 21'		Leonardo 36'	Stadium: Beira-Rio; Attendance: 23,490; Referee: Antônio Pereira da Silva

November 14 14	São Paulo	1–0	Botafogo	São Paulo
	Müller 88'			Stadium: Morumbi; Attendance: 30,825; Referee: Márcio Rezende de Freitas

==== Second stage ====
Pos	Team	Pld	W	D	L	GF	GA	GD	Pts	Qualification
1	Palmeiras	6	4	2	0	10	3	+7	10	Qualified for the final
2	São Paulo	6	4	1	1	8	5	+3	9	
3	Guarani	6	1	1	4	12	12	0	3	
4	Remo	6	0	2	4	4	14	−10	2	

===== Matches =====
November 19 1	Guarani	0–1	São Paulo	Campinas
			Guilherme 45'	Stadium: Brinco de Ouro; Attendance: 20,356; Referee: Dionísio Roberto Domingos

November 21 2	Palmeiras	1–1	São Paulo	São Paulo
	Edílson 2'		Leonardo 5'	Stadium: Morumbi; Attendance: 55,262; Referee: João Paulo Araújo

November 26 3	São Paulo	2–0	Remo	São Paulo
	Müller 42'; Palhinha 60'			Stadium: Morumbi; Attendance: 3,805; Referee: Cláudio Vinícius Cerdeira

November 28 4	São Paulo	3–2	Guarani	São Paulo
	Palhinha 17'; Juninho 66'; Cafu 74'		Clóvis 49'; Alex 81'	Stadium: Morumbi; Attendance: 17,096; Referee: Silas Santana

December 1 5	Remo	0–1	São Paulo	Belém
			André Luiz 64'	Stadium: Mangueirão; Attendance: 8,805; Referee: Sidrack Marinho dos Santos

December 4 6	São Paulo	0–2	Palmeiras	São Paulo
			Edmundo 67'; César Sampaio 82'	Stadium: Morumbi; Attendance: 60,322; Referee: Dionísio Roberto Domingues

- # Match valid simultaneously for the Campeonato Brasileiro and Recopa Sudamericana.

==== Record ====
Final Position	Points	Matches	Wins	Draws	Losses	Goals For	Goals Away	Win%
4th	26	20	9	8	3	27	17	65%

=== Recopa Sudamericana ===
September 26 First leg#	São Paulo (Brazil)	0–0	(Brazil) Cruzeiro	São Paulo
				Stadium: Morumbi; Attendance: 12,974; Referee: Renato Marsiglia (BRA)

September 29 Second leg	Cruzeiro (Brazil)	0–0 (0–0 agg.) (2–4 p)	(Brazil) São Paulo	Belo Horizonte
				Stadium: Mineirão; Referee: Jorge Luis Nieves Parra (URU)
	Penalties
	Paulo Roberto (penalty missed); Ronaldo (penalty missed); Luís Fernando (penalty scored); Ademir (penalty scored)		(penalty scored) Dinho; (penalty scored) Cafu; (penalty scored) Válber; (penalty scored) Ronaldão

- # Match valid simultaneously for the Recopa Sudamericana and Campeonato Brasileiro.

==== Record ====
Final Position	Points	Matches	Wins	Draws	Losses	Goals For	Goals Away	Win%
1st	2	2	0	2	0	0	0	50%

=== Supercopa Sudamericana ===
==== Eightfinals ====
6 October 1993 1	São Paulo (Brazil)	2–0	(Argentina) Independiente	São Paulo
	Moas 27' (o.g.); Valdeir 69'			Stadium: Morumbi; Referee: Oscar Velazquez

13 October 1993 2	Independiente (Argentina)	1–1 (1–3 agg.)	(Brazil) São Paulo	Avellaneda
	Pérez 87'		Valdeir 22'	Stadium: Estadio Presidente Juan Domingo Perón; Referee: Ernesto Filippi

==== Quarterfinals ====
20 October 1993	São Paulo (Brazil)	2–2	(Brazil) Grêmio	São Paulo
	Cafu 7'; Dinho 60'		Charles 53'; Caio 62'	Stadium: Estádio do Pacaembu; Referee: Marcio Rezende de Freitas

27 October 1993 2	Grêmio (Brazil)	0–1 (2–3 agg.)	(Brazil) São Paulo	Porto Alegre
			Toninho Cerezo 52'	Stadium: Estádio Olímpico Monumental; Referee: Cláudio Cerdeira

==== Semifinals ====
3 November 1993 1	São Paulo (Brazil)	1–0	(Colombia) Atlético Nacional	São Paulo
	Müller 77'			Stadium: Estádio do Pacaembu; Referee: Jorge Nieves

10 November 1993 2	Atlético Nacional (Colombia)	2–1 (2–2 agg.) (4–5 p)	(Brazil) São Paulo	Medellín
	Aristizábal 38'; Zuñiga 57'		Palhinha 6'	Stadium: Estadio Atanasio Girardot; Referee: Alberto Tejada

==== Finals ====
17 November 1993 1	Flamengo (Brazil)	2–2	(Brazil) São Paulo	Rio de Janeiro
	Marquinhos 33', 46'		Leonardo 15'; Juninho 86'	Stadium: Estádio do Maracanã; Referee: Marcio Rezende de Freitas

24 November 1993 2	São Paulo (Brazil)	2–2 (4–4 agg.) (5–3 p)	(Brazil) Flamengo	São Paulo
	Leonardo 61'; Juninho 79'		Renato Gaúcho 9'; Marquinhos 82'	Stadium: Estádio do Morumbi; Attendance: 65,355; Referee: Renato Marsiglia
	Penalties
	(penalty scored) Dinho; (penalty scored) Leonardo; (penalty scored) Cafu; (penalty scored) André Luiz; (penalty scored) Müller		(penalty scored) Rogério; (penalty missed) Marcelinho Carioca; (penalty scored) Marquinhos; (penalty scored) Gelson

==== Record ====
Final Position	Points	Matches	Wins	Draws	Losses	Goals For	Goals Away	Win%
1st	9	8	2	5	1	12	9	56%

=== Intercontinental Cup ===
December 12 Final	Milan (Italy)	2–3	(Brazil) São Paulo	Tokyo
	Massaro 48'; Papin 81'		Palhinha 19'; Toninho Cerezo 59'; Müller 86'	Stadium: National Tokyo Stadium; Attendance: 52,275; Referee: Joël Quiniou

==== Record ====
Final Position	Points	Matches	Wins	Draws	Losses	Goals For	Goals Away	Win%
1st	2	1	1	0	0	3	2	100%
