= List of Recopa Sudamericana matches =

- Founded: 1989
- Region: South America (CONMEBOL)
- Teams: 2
- Current champions: (Argentina) Lanús (1st title)
- Most championships: (Argentina) Boca Juniors (4 titles)
- 2026 Recopa Sudamericana

The Recopa Sudamericana is an annual association football competition organized by CONMEBOL. It is contested between the winners of the Copa Libertadores and the Copa Sudamericana. The Recopa Sudamericana was contested between the winners of the Copa Libertadores, and the Supercopa Sudamericana, from 1989 until 1998, when CONMEBOL discontinued the Supercopa Sudamericana. The last Recopa Sudamericana in this format was the 1998 edition between Cruzeiro and River Plate which was won by the former.

The format of the competition has varied greatly; it has been played over two legs, one at each participating club's stadium, or at a single neutral venue. Since the 2005 competition, the final has been contested in a home-and-away format. The 1998 competition was played as part of the Copa Mercosur. The 1993 tournament was played as part of the Campeonato Brasileiro Série A. The 1991 edition was not played at all since Paraguay's Olimpia won both the Libertadores and Supercopa. Although Brazilian team São Paulo also won the two qualifying competitions, they disputed the 1994 edition against Copa CONMEBOL winner Botafogo.

Like all CONMEBOL tournaments, the teams accumulate points according to the results of the match (3 for a win, 1 for a draw, 0 for a loss). The team with the most points after both legs wins the Recopa. The current Recopa is contested over a two-legged tie; the first leg is held at the stadium of the Copa Sudamericana champion, and the second leg is played at the Copa Libertadores champion's venue. Ties in points are settled initially on goal difference, then by away goals. If the teams are tied after full-time, a penalty shootout will decide the winner of the finals.

Argentine club Boca Juniors hold the record for the most victories, winning the competition four times. Boca Juniors, River Plate, São Paulo, and Ecuador's LDU Quito are the only teams to have defended the title successfully. Brazilian clubs are the most successful in the tournament, having amassed thirteen titles. The current champion is Lanús, who beat Flamengo to win the 2026 Recopa Sudamericana.

== Matches ==
Key
Finals decided after extra time
Finals decided by a penalty shoot-out
Winners of the Copa Libertadores
Winners of the Supercopa Libertadores
Winners of the Copa Sudamericana
Winners of the Copa CONMEBOL

List of Recopa Sudamericana finals
Year	Country	Winners	Score	Runners-up	Country	Venue	Attendance
1989	URU	Nacional	1–0	Racing	ARG	(Uruguay) Estadio Centenario, Montevideo	20,221
1989	URU	Nacional	0–0	Racing	ARG	(Argentina) Estadio José Amalfitani, Buenos Aires	50,000
1990	ARG	Boca Juniors	1–0	Atlético Nacional	COL	(United States) Miami Orange Bowl, Miami	9,000
1991	(Paraguay) Olimpia was declared champion after winning both Copa Libertadores and Supercopa Sudamericana.						
1992	CHI	Colo-Colo	0–0 (Note: Score was 0–0 after 90 minutes. Colo-Colo won the penalty-shootout 5–4.)	Cruzeiro	BRA	(Japan) Kobe Universiade Memorial Stadium, Kobe	60,000
1993	BRA	São Paulo	0–0	Cruzeiro	BRA	(Brazil) Estádio do Morumbi, São Paulo	12,974
1993	BRA	São Paulo	0–0 (Note: Score was 2–2 aggregate after 90 minutes. São Paulo won the penalty-shootout 4–2.)	Cruzeiro	BRA	(Brazil) Mineirão, Belo Horizonte	20,000
1994	BRA	São Paulo (Note: São Paulo was also the 1993 Supercopa Sudamericana winner.)	3–1	Botafogo	BRA	(Japan) Kobe Universiade Memorial Stadium, Kobe	—
1995	ARG	Independiente	1–0	Vélez Sársfield	ARG	(Japan) National Stadium, Tokyo	25,300
1996	BRA	Grêmio	4–1	Independiente	ARG	(Japan) Kobe Universiade Memorial Stadium, Kobe	—
1997	ARG	Vélez Sársfield	1–1 (Note: Score was 1–1 after 90 minutes. Vélez Sársfield won the penalty-shootout 4–2.)	River Plate	ARG	(Japan) Kobe Universiade Memorial Stadium, Kobe	—
1998	BRA	Cruzeiro	2–0	River Plate	ARG	(Brazil) Mineirão, Belo Horizonte	18,000
1998	BRA	Cruzeiro	3–0	River Plate	ARG	(Argentina) Estadio Antonio V. Liberti, Buenos Aires	11,000
From 1999 until 2002 the Recopa Sudamericana wasn't contested due to the Supercopa Libertadores being discontinued.
2003	PAR	Olimpia	2–0	San Lorenzo	ARG	(United States) Los Angeles Memorial Coliseum, Los Angeles	8,000
2004	PER	Cienciano	1–1 (Note: Score was 1–1 after 90 minutes. Cienciano won the penalty-shootout 4–2.)	Boca Juniors	ARG	(United States) Lockhart Stadium, Fort Lauderdale	7,000
2005	ARG	Boca Juniors	3–1	Once Caldas	COL	(Argentina) La Bombonera, Buenos Aires	45,000
2005	ARG	Boca Juniors	1–2	Once Caldas	COL	(Colombia) Estadio Palogrande, Manizales	30,000
2006	ARG	Boca Juniors	2–1	São Paulo	BRA	(Argentina) La Bombonera, Buenos Aires	35,426
2006	ARG	Boca Juniors	2–2	São Paulo	BRA	(Brazil) Estádio do Morumbi, São Paulo	19,861
2007	BRA	Internacional	1–2	Pachuca	MEX	(Mexico) Estadio Hidalgo, Pachuca	10,080
2007	BRA	Internacional	4–0	Pachuca	MEX	(Brazil) Estádio Beira-Rio, Porto Alegre	46,744
2008	ARG	Boca Juniors	3–1	Arsenal	ARG	(Argentina) El Cilindro, Avellaneda	10,359
2008	ARG	Boca Juniors	2–2	Arsenal	ARG	(Argentina) La Bombonera, Buenos Aires	32,357
2009	ECU	LDU Quito	1–0	Internacional	BRA	(Brazil) Estádio Beira-Rio, Porto Alegre	30,284
2009	ECU	LDU Quito	3–0	Internacional	BRA	(Ecuador) Estadio Casa Blanca, Quito	55,000
2010	ECU	LDU Quito	2–1	Estudiantes	ARG	(Ecuador) Estadio Casa Blanca, Quito	30,000
2010	ECU	LDU Quito	0–0	Estudiantes	ARG	(Argentina) Estadio Centenario, Quilmes	24,000
2011	BRA	Internacional	1–2	Independiente	ARG	(Argentina) Estadio Libertadores de América, Avellaneda	40,000
2011	BRA	Internacional	3–1	Independiente	ARG	(Brazil) Estádio Beira-Rio, Porto Alegre	39,000
2012	BRA	Santos	0–0	Universidad de Chile	CHI	(Chile) Estadio Nacional Julio Martínez Prádanos, Santiago	35,000
2012	BRA	Santos	2–0	Universidad de Chile	CHI	(Brazil) Estádio do Pacaembu, São Paulo	24,000
2013	BRA	Corinthians	2–1	São Paulo	BRA	(Brazil) Estádio do Morumbi, São Paulo	31,691
2013	BRA	Corinthians	2–0	São Paulo	BRA	(Brazil) Estádio do Pacaembu, São Paulo	38,050
2014	BRA	Atlético Mineiro	1–0	Lanús	ARG	(Argentina) Estadio Ciudad de Lanús, Lanús	12,000
2014	BRA	Atlético Mineiro	4–3 (a.e.t.)	Lanús	ARG	(Brazil) Mineirão, Belo Horizonte	54,786
2015	ARG	River Plate	1–0	San Lorenzo	ARG	(Argentina) Estadio Antonio V. Liberti, Buenos Aires	64,650
2015	ARG	River Plate	1–0	San Lorenzo	ARG	(Argentina) Estadio Pedro Bidegain, Buenos Aires	45,000
2016	ARG	River Plate	0–0	Santa Fe	COL	(Colombia) Estadio El Campín, Bogotá	18,868
2016	ARG	River Plate	2–1	Santa Fe	COL	(Argentina) Estadio Antonio V. Liberti, Buenos Aires	62,000
2017	COL	Atlético Nacional	1–2	Chapecoense	BRA	(Brazil) Arena Condá, Chapecó	19,005
2017	COL	Atlético Nacional	4–1	Chapecoense	BRA	(Colombia) Estadio Atanasio Girardot, Medellín	40,450
2018	BRA	Grêmio	1–1	Independiente	ARG	(Argentina) Estadio Libertadores de América, Avellaneda	47,000
2018	BRA	Grêmio	0–0 (Note: Score was 1–1 aggregate after 90 minutes and extra time. Grêmio won the penalty-shootout 5–4.)	Independiente	ARG	(Brazil) Arena do Grêmio, Porto Alegre	42,921
2019	ARG	River Plate	0–1	Athletico Paranaense	BRA	(Brazil) Arena da Baixada, Curitiba	30,406
2019	ARG	River Plate	3–0	Athletico Paranaense	BRA	(Argentina) Estadio Antonio V. Liberti, Buenos Aires	66,500
2020	BRA	Flamengo	2–2	Independiente del Valle	ECU	(Ecuador) Estadio Olímpico Atahualpa, Quito	15,031
2020	BRA	Flamengo	3–0	Independiente del Valle	ECU	(Brazil) Maracanã, Rio de Janeiro	69,986
2021	ARG	Defensa y Justicia	1–2	Palmeiras	BRA	(Argentina) Estadio Norberto Tomaghello, Florencio Varela	0 (Note: The 2021 finals were played behind closed doors due to the COVID-19 pandemic in South America.)
2021	ARG	Defensa y Justicia	2–1 (Note: Score was 3–3 aggregate after 90 minutes and extra time. Defensa y Justicia won the penalty-shootout 4–3.)	Palmeiras	BRA	(Brazil) Estádio Nacional Mané Garrincha, Brasília	0
2022	BRA	Palmeiras	2–2	Athletico Paranaense	BRA	(Brazil) Arena da Baixada, Curitiba	25,072
2022	BRA	Palmeiras	2–0	Athletico Paranaense	BRA	(Brazil) Allianz Parque, São Paulo	30,065
2023	ECU	Independiente del Valle	1–0	Flamengo	BRA	(Ecuador) Estadio Independiente del Valle, Quito	8,811
2023	ECU	Independiente del Valle	0–1 (Note: Score was 1–1 aggregate after 90 minutes and extra time. Independiente del Valle won the penalty-shootout 5–4.)	Flamengo	BRA	(Brazil) Maracanã, Rio de Janeiro	71,411
2024	BRA	Fluminense	0–1	LDU Quito	ECU	(Ecuador) Estadio Rodrigo Paz Delgado, Quito	30,712
2024	BRA	Fluminense	2–0	LDU Quito	ECU	(Brazil) Maracanã, Rio de Janeiro	61,217
2025	ARG	Racing	2–0	Botafogo	BRA	(Argentina) El Cilindro, Avellaneda	35,538
2025	ARG	Racing	2–0	Botafogo	BRA	(Brazil) Estádio Olímpico Nílton Santos, Rio de Janeiro	30,975
2026	ARG	Lanús	1–0	Flamengo	BRA	(Argentina) Estadio Ciudad de Lanús, Lanús	
2026	ARG	Lanús	3–2 (a.e.t.)	Flamengo	BRA	(Brazil) Maracanã, Rio de Janeiro	64,470

== Performances ==
=== By club ===
Performance in the Recopa Sudamericana by club
Club	Titles	Runners-up	Seasons won	Seasons runner-up
(Argentina) Boca Juniors	4	1	1990, 2005, 2006, 2008	2004
(Argentina) River Plate	3	2	2015, 2016, 2019	1997, 1998
(Brazil) São Paulo	2	2	1993, 1994	2006, 2013
(Brazil) Internacional	2	1	2007, 2011	2009
(Ecuador) LDU Quito	2	1	2009, 2010	2024
(Paraguay) Olimpia	2	0	1991, 2003	—
(Brazil) Grêmio	2	0	1996, 2018	—
(Argentina) Independiente	1	3	1995	1996, 2011, 2018
(Brazil) Cruzeiro	1	2	1998	1992, 1993
(Brazil) Flamengo	1	2	2020	2023, 2026
(Argentina) Vélez Sarsfield	1	1	1997	1995
(Colombia) Atlético Nacional	1	1	2017	1990
(Brazil) Palmeiras	1	1	2022	2021
(Ecuador) Independiente del Valle	1	1	2023	2020
(Argentina) Racing	1	1	2025	1989
(Argentina) Lanús	1	1	2026	2014
(Uruguay) Nacional	1	0	1989	—
(Chile) Colo-Colo	1	0	1992	—
(Peru) Cienciano	1	0	2004	—
(Brazil) Santos	1	0	2012	—
(Brazil) Corinthians	1	0	2013	—
(Brazil) Atlético Mineiro	1	0	2014	—
(Argentina) Defensa y Justicia	1	0	2021	—
(Brazil) Fluminense	1	0	2024	—
(Argentina) San Lorenzo	0	2	—	2003, 2015
(Brazil) Athletico Paranaense	0	2	—	2019, 2022
(Brazil) Botafogo	0	2	—	1994, 2025
(Colombia) Once Caldas	0	1	—	2005
(Mexico) Pachuca	0	1	—	2007
(Argentina) Arsenal	0	1	—	2008
(Argentina) Estudiantes	0	1	—	2010
Universidad de Chile	0	1	—	2012
(Colombia) Santa Fe	0	1	—	2016
(Brazil) Chapecoense	0	1	—	2017

=== By country ===
Country	Winners	Runners-up	Winning clubs	Runners-up
Brazil	13	13	São Paulo (2), Internacional (2), Grêmio (2), Cruzeiro (1), Santos (1), Corinthians (1), Atlético Mineiro (1), Flamengo (1), Palmeiras (1), Fluminense (1)	Cruzeiro (2), São Paulo (2), Athletico Paranaense (2), Botafogo (2), Flamengo (2), Internacional (1), Chapecoense (1), Palmeiras (1)
Argentina	12	13	Boca Juniors (4), River Plate (3), Independiente (1), Vélez Sársfield (1), Defensa y Justicia (1), Racing (1), Lanús (1)	Independiente (3), River Plate (2), San Lorenzo (2), Boca Juniors (1), Vélez Sársfield (1), Racing (1), Arsenal (1), Estudiantes (1), Lanús (1)
Ecuador	3	2	LDU Quito (2), Independiente del Valle (1)	Independiente del Valle (1), LDU Quito (1)
Paraguay	2	0	Olimpia (2)	—
Colombia	1	3	Atlético Nacional (1)	Atlético Nacional (1), Once Caldas (1), Santa Fe (1)
Chile	1	1	Colo-Colo (1)	Universidad de Chile (1)
Uruguay	1	0	Nacional (1)	—
Peru	1	0	Cienciano (1)	—
Mexico	0	1	—	Pachuca (1)

=== By method of qualification ===
Cup	Winners	Runners-up
Copa Libertadores	20	12
Copa Sudamericana	9	15
Supercopa Sudamericana	3	5
Copa Libertadores and Supercopa Sudamericana	2	0
Copa CONMEBOL	0	1

== See also ==
- List of Recopa Sudamericana winning managers
