= List of Recopa Sudamericana winning managers =

This is a list of Recopa Sudamericana winning football managers. The Recopa Sudamericana is an annual football contest played between the previous season's Copa Libertadores and Copa Sudamericana winners. The first final was played in 1989 over two legs between Uruguayan team Nacional and Argentina's Racing; Nacional won 4–1 under the guidance of Héctor Núñez.

As of 2009, Argentinian managers have been the most successful, winning six tournaments in total, followed by Brazilians with five wins and Uruguayans with four titles. On only five occasions, the tournament was won by foreign managers—Croatian Mirko Jozić led Chilean side Colo-Colo to victory in 1992, Uruguayan Jorge Fossati led LDU Quito to win in 2009, his compatriot Luis Cubilla won the tournament with Paraguayan club Olimpia in 1991 and 2003 and Portuguese Jorge Jesus led Flamengo to the trophy in 2020 .

Jozić and Jesus are the only managers from outside South America to have won the competition. Olimpia, Colo-Colo, and LDU Quito are the only winning sides that has never won the trophy with a national manager. Marcelo Gallardo is the most successful manager with three trophies won, all with River Plate. Besides him, Luis Cubilla, Telê Santana and Alfio Basile are the only managers to have won the competition twice. Of these managers, Gallardo, Santana and Basile are the only ones to win trophies in consecutive years, thus revalidating their previous titles.

== By year ==
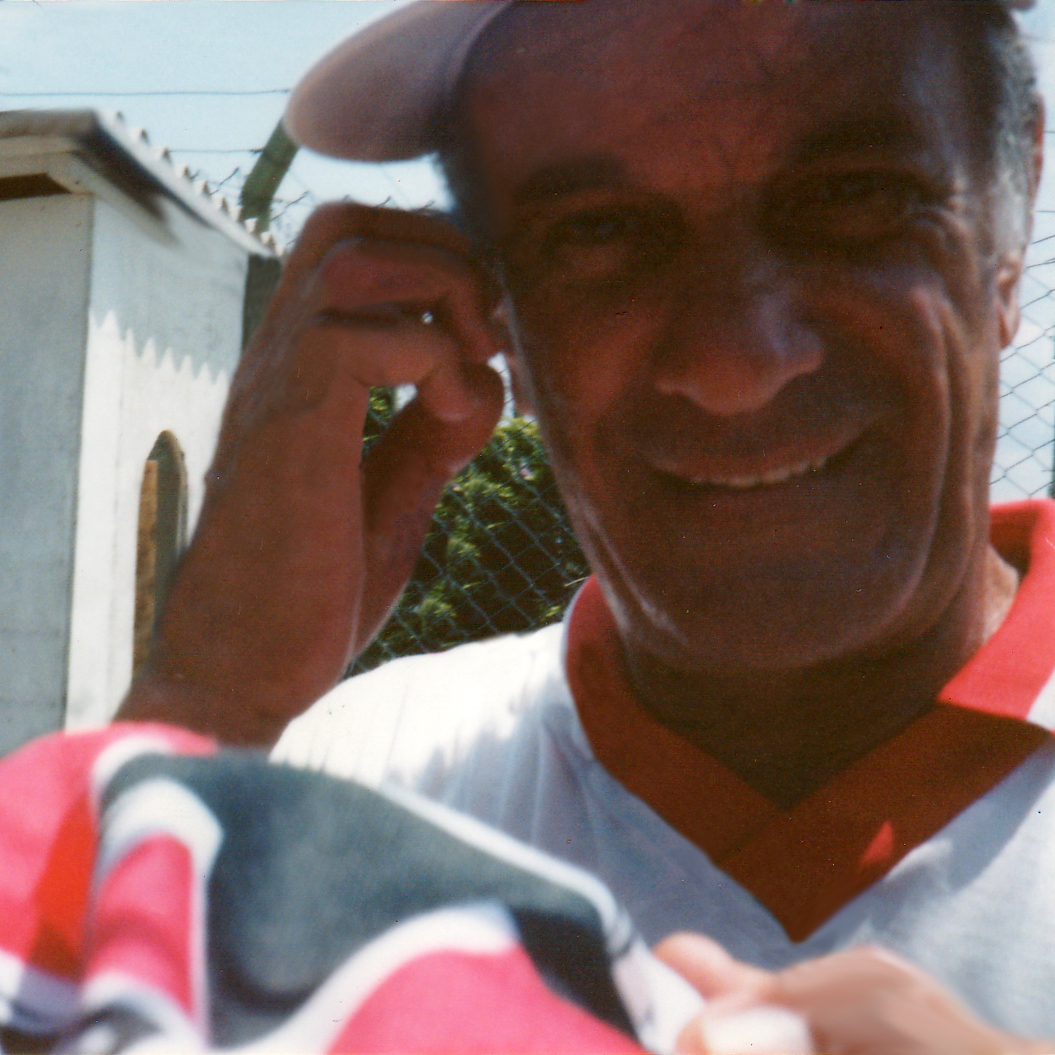
Telê Santana won back-to-back titles with São Paulo in 1993 and 1994.

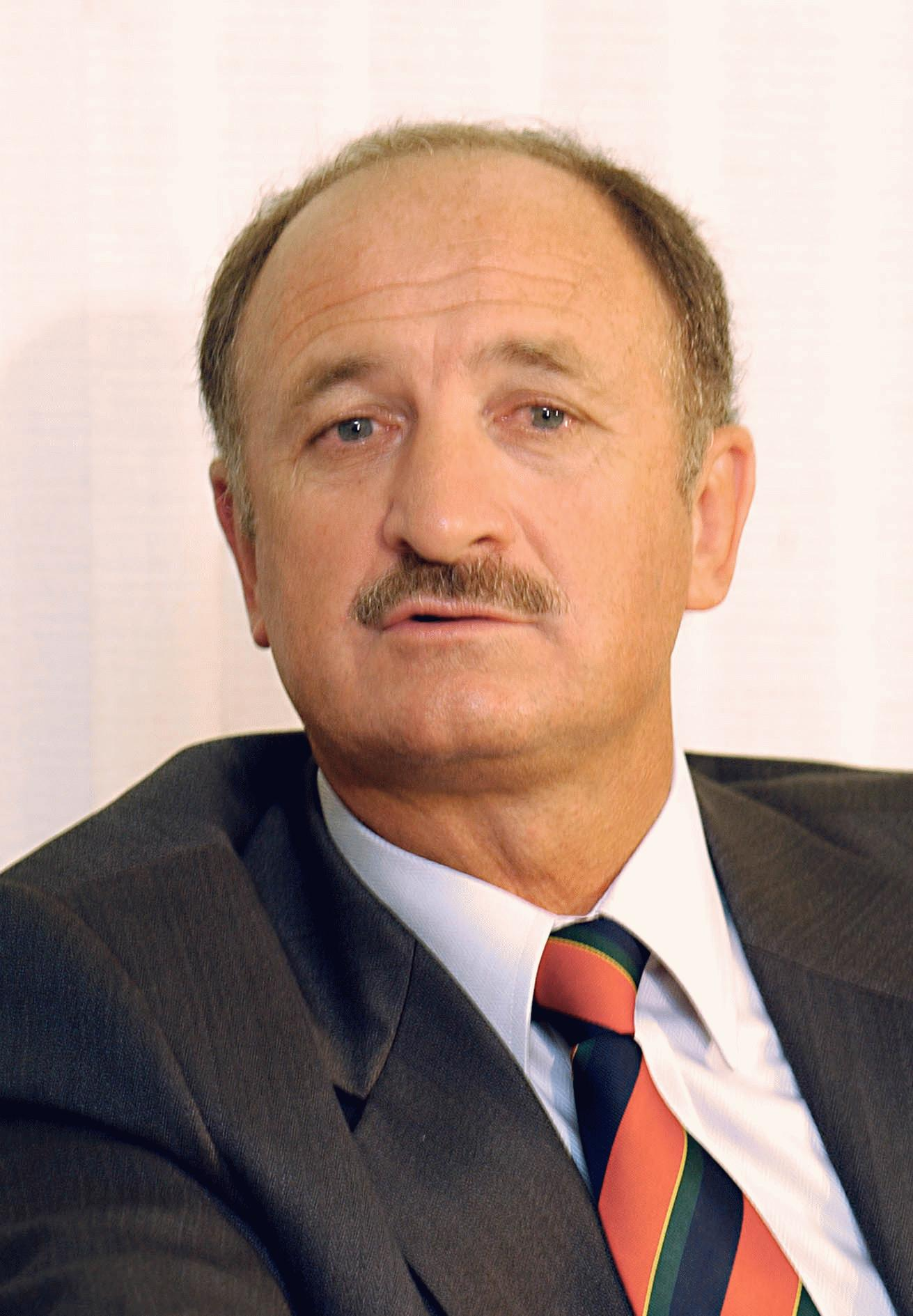
Luiz Felipe Scolari won the Cup with Grêmio in 1996.

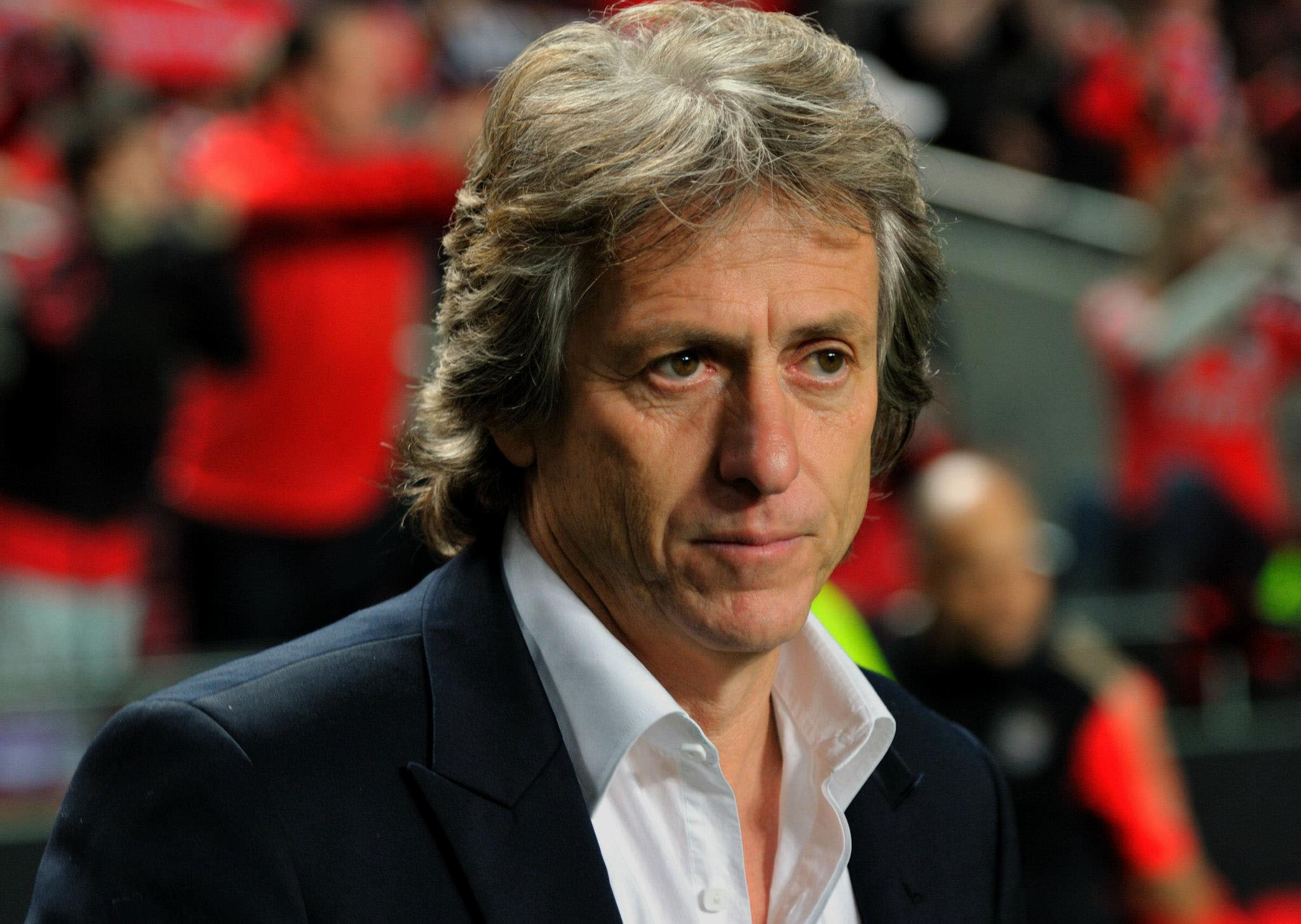
Jorge Jesus won the Cup with Flamengo in 2020.

Final		Winning manager		Club	Ref(s)
1989	URU	Héctor Núñez	URU	Nacional	
1990	ARG	Carlos Aimar	ARG	Boca Juniors	
1991	URU	Luis Cubilla	PAR	Olimpia	
1992	YUG	Mirko Jozić	CHI	Colo-Colo	
1993	BRA	Telê Santana	BRA	São Paulo	
1994	BRA	Telê Santana	BRA	São Paulo	
1995	ARG	Miguel Ángel Brindisi	ARG	Independiente	
1996	BRA	Luiz Felipe Scolari	BRA	Grêmio	
1997	ARG	Osvaldo Piazza	ARG	Vélez Sarsfield	
1998	BRA	Levir Culpi	BRA	Cruzeiro	
2003	URU	Luis Cubilla	PAR	Olimpia	
2004	PER	Freddy Ternero	PER	Cienciano	
2005	ARG	Alfio Basile	ARG	Boca Juniors	
2006	ARG	Alfio Basile	ARG	Boca Juniors	
2007	BRA	Alexandre Gallo	BRA	Internacional	
2008	ARG	Carlos Ischia	ARG	Boca Juniors	
2009	URU	Jorge Fossati	ECU	LDU Quito	
2010	ARG	Edgardo Bauza	ECU	LDU Quito	
2011	BRA	Dorival Júnior	BRA	Internacional	
2012	BRA	Muricy Ramalho	BRA	Santos	
2013	BRA	Tite	BRA	Corinthians	
2014	BRA	Levir Culpi	BRA	Atlético Mineiro	
2015	ARG	Marcelo Gallardo	ARG	River Plate	
2016	ARG	Marcelo Gallardo	ARG	River Plate	
2017	COL	Reinaldo Rueda	COL	Atlético Nacional	
2018	BRA	Renato Gaúcho	BRA	Grêmio	
2019	ARG	Marcelo Gallardo	ARG	River Plate	
2020	POR	Jorge Jesus	BRA	Flamengo	
2021	ARG	Sebastián Beccacece	ARG	Defensa y Justicia	
2022	POR	Abel Ferreira	BRA	Palmeiras	
2023	ARG	Martín Anselmi	ECU	Independiente del Valle	
2024	BRA	Fernando Diniz	BRA	Fluminense	
2025	ARG	Gustavo Costas	ARG	Racing	
2026	ARG	Mauricio Pellegrino	ARG	Lanús	

== By nationality ==
This table lists the total number of titles won by managers of each nationality.

Nationality	Number of wins
Argentina	14
Brazil	11
Uruguay	4
Portugal	2
Colombia	1
Peru	1
Croatia	1
