= 1993 Intercontinental Cup =

- Match programme cover
- Event: Intercontinental Cup
Milan	São Paulo
(Italy)	(Brazil)
2	3
- Date: 12 December 1993
- Venue: National Stadium, Tokyo
- Man of the Match: Toninho Cerezo (São Paulo)
- Referee: Joël Quiniou (France)
- Attendance: 52,275

The 1993 Intercontinental Cup was an association football match played on 12 December 1993 between Milan, runners-up of the 1992–93 UEFA Champions League, and São Paulo, winners of the 1993 Copa Libertadores. The match was played at the National Stadium in Tokyo. Milan were making a fifth appearance in the competition, after the victories in 1969, 1989, 1990, and the defeat in 1963, while São Paulo's were looking to defend their title, after victory in the previous edition. Marseille, the winners of 1992–93 UEFA Champions League were not allowed to participate, because of match-fixing scandal involving the club, which saw them stripped from 1992–93 French Division 1 title and banned from international club competitions (1993–94 UEFA Champions League, 1993 European Super Cup and Intercontinental Cup). Because of the scandal, Milan was allowed to play in both the Super Cup and the Intercontinental Cup.

Toninho Cerezo was named man of the match.

== Venue ==
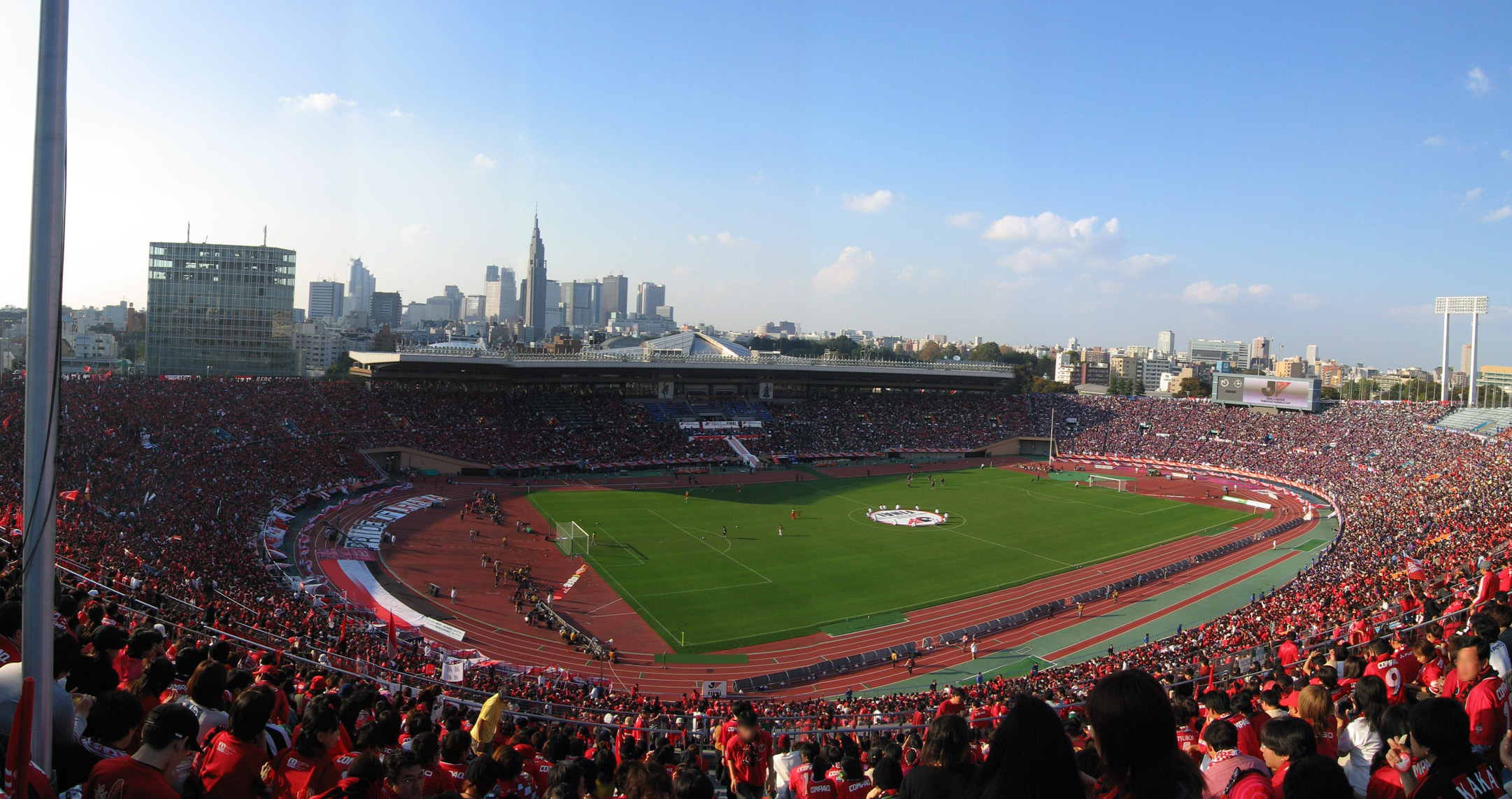
The National Stadium in Tokyo hosted the match

== Match details ==
12 December 1993
12:00 UTC+09:00

Milan (Italy)	2–3	(Brazil) São Paulo
Massaro 48'; Papin 81'	Report	Palhinha 19'; Toninho Cerezo 59'; Müller 87'

National Stadium, Tokyo
Attendance: 52,275
Referee: Joël Quiniou (France)

Milan	São Paulo

GK	1	(Italy) Sebastiano Rossi
RB	2	(Italy) Christian Panucci
CB	6	(Italy) Franco Baresi (c)
CB	5	(Italy) Alessandro Costacurta
LB	3	(Italy) Paolo Maldini
RM	4	(Italy) Demetrio Albertini	(substituted off) 79'
CM	8	(France) Marcel Desailly
LM	7	(Italy) Roberto Donadoni
CF	10	(Italy) Daniele Massaro
CF	9	(France) Jean-Pierre Papin
CF	11	(Romania) Florin Răducioiu	(substituted off) 79'
Substitutes:
GK	12	(Italy) Mario Ielpo
DF	13	(Italy) Mauro Tassotti	(substituted on) 79'
MF	14	(Italy) Fernando De Napoli
DF	15	(Italy) Filippo Galli
MF	16	(Italy) Alessandro Orlando	(substituted on) 79'
Manager:
(Italy) Fabio Capello

GK	1	(Brazil) Zetti
RB	2	(Brazil) Cafu
CB	3	(Brazil) Válber
CB	4	(Brazil) Ronaldão (c)
LB	6	(Brazil) André Luiz
DM	5	(Brazil) Doriva
DM	8	(Brazil) Dinho
AM	11	(Brazil) Toninho Cerezo
AM	10	(Brazil) Leonardo
CF	7	(Brazil) Müller
CF	9	(Brazil) Palhinha	(substituted off) 64'
Substitutes:
GK	12	(Brazil) Rogério Ceni
DF	13	(Brazil) Gilmar
MF	14	(Brazil) Luís Carlos Goiano
MF	15	(Brazil) Juninho Paulista	(substituted on) 64'
FW	16	(Brazil) Valdeir
Manager:
(Brazil) Telê Santana

Man of the Match:
Toninho Cerezo (São Paulo)

== See also ==
- 1992–93 UEFA Champions League
- 1993 Copa Libertadores
- A.C. Milan in international football competitions
