= Dinho (Brazilian footballer) =

Brazilian footballer (born 1966)

Personal information
- Full name: Edi Wilson José dos Santos
- Date of birth: 15 October 1966 (age 60)
- Place of birth: Neópolis, Brazil
- Height: 1.78 m (5 ft 10 in)
- Positions: Centre-back; defensive midfielder

Senior career*
Years	Team	Apps	(Gls)
1985–1986	Confiança		
1986–1991	Sport Recife		
1991–1992	Deportivo La Coruña	2	(1)
1992–1993	São Paulo	114	(12)
1994	Santos		
1995–1997	Grêmio	106	(18)
1998–2000	América Mineiro		
2002	Novo Hamburgo		

International career
1993	Brazil	1	(0)

Managerial career
- 2005–2006: Luverdense
- 2008: Grêmio (youth)
- * Club domestic league appearances and goals as of 10 June 2023

Edi Wilson José dos Santos (born 15 October 1966), better known as Dinho, is a former football manager and player. As a player, he played as a centre-back or defensive midfielder, most notably for São Paulo and Grêmio.

Started a manager career with Luverdense in 2005-2006 and with Grêmio youth sectors.

== Personal life ==
Dinho also acted in politics, being councilor of the city of Porto Alegre between 2014 and 2016.

== International career ==
Dinho just called up once time, in the friendly match against Mexico, 16 December 1993.

== Honours ==
Confiança

- Campeonato Sergipano: 1986

Sport Recife

- Campeonato Brasileiro: 1987
- Campeonato Pernambucano 1988, 1990
- Campeonato Brasileiro Série B: 1990

São Paulo

- Campeonato Paulista: 1992
- Copa Libertadores: 1993
- Intercontinental Cup: 1992, 1993
- Supercopa Libertadores: 1993
- Recopa Sudamericana: 1993

Grêmio

- Copa do Brasil: 1994, 1997
- Campeonato Gaúcho: 1995, 1996
- Copa Libertadores: 1995
- Sanwa Bank Cup: 1995
- Recopa Sudamericana: 1996
- Campeonato Brasileiro: 1996
