= Guilherme Alves =

Brazilian footballer and manager (born 1974)

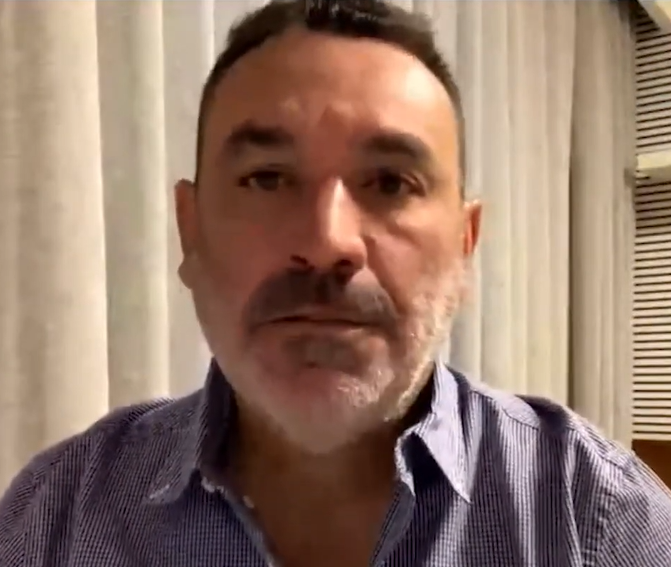
- Guilherme in 2023

Personal information
- Full name: Guilherme de Cássio Alves
- Date of birth: 8 May 1974 (age 52)
- Place of birth: Marília, Brazil
- Height: 1.83 m (6 ft 0 in)
- Position: Striker

Youth career
- 1983–1991: Marília

Senior career*
Years	Team	Apps	(Gls)
1992–1993	Marília	40	(14)
1993–1994	São Paulo	25	(10)
1995–1997	Rayo Vallecano	89	(38)
1997	Grêmio	21	(16)
1998–1999	Vasco da Gama	2	(0)
1999–2003	Atlético Mineiro	128	(85)
2002	→ Corinthians (loan)	19	(13)
2003–2004	Al-Ittihad	6	(5)
2004	Cruzeiro	30	(10)
2005	Botafogo	27	(6)
Total		387	(197)

International career
2000–2001	Brazil	6	(1)

Managerial career
- 2007–2008: Marília (assistant)
- 2008: Marília (interim)
- 2010: Atlético Mineiro (assistant)
- 2011: Ipatinga
- 2012: Marília
- 2013–2016: Novorizontino
- 2016: Vila Nova
- 2017: Linense
- 2018: Portuguesa
- 2018: Paysandu
- 2020–2023: Marília
- 2024: Velo Clube
- 2024: Água Santa
- 2025: Velo Clube
- 2025: Amazonas
- 2026: Noroeste
- * Club domestic league appearances and goals

Guilherme de Cássio Alves (born 8 May 1974), known simply as Guilherme, is a Brazilian football coach and former player.

A former striker, Guilherme is best known for his time at Atlético Mineiro and also represented Brazil national team at the 2001 Copa América.

== Club career ==
Born in Marília, São Paulo, Guilherme started his professional career at age 18 with local Marília AC. After a few games, São Paulo FC manager Telê Santana signed him, and he played a relatively important part in the club's conquests in the following two years: the Supercopa Sudamericana, the Copa Libertadores, the Intercontinental Cup, the Copa CONMEBOL and the Recopa Sudamericana.

In January 1995, Guilherme left for Spain and joined Rayo Vallecano, scoring 14 goals in only 17 matches (half-a-season) as the team achieved promotion to La Liga. During the following two campaigns, he continued to net in double digits, but they returned to the second division at the end of the latter.

In 1997, Guilherme returned to his country with Grêmio. In the following year he moved to Vasco da Gama, where he was very rarely played, but also helped to the Torneio Rio – São Paulo conquest.

Still in 1999, Guilherme signed with Atlético Mineiro, where he experienced his best years as a professional. In the year's Série A, he was crowned top scorer by breaking the record which belonged to club legend Reinaldo, and led the team to the vice-championship.

Guilherme played one year on loan with Corinthians, scoring twice in his debut, a 3–2 home win against Internacional. However, his stay was marred by a serious car accident which resulted in the death of two persons. He never regained his previous form with Corinthians, and after leaving Atlético for good (with a total of 139 official goals), represented Al-Ittihad of Saudi Arabia.

In the year 2004, Guilherme signed for Cruzeiro, scoring 13 goals in 50 competitive games and helping the team to the Campeonato Mineiro. He finished his career in the following year, with Botafogo; he suffered a serious injury while at the service of the latter and, whilst recovering from his condition at Corinthians, severely hurt his thigh and decided to end his career, at 31.

== International career ==
Courtesy of his solid Atlético performances, Guilherme played a total of six matches with Brazil, his debut coming in 2000. He was called up for the squad which represented the nation in the following year's Copa América, scoring in a 2–0 group stage win against Peru in an eventual quarter-final exit.

== Coaching career ==
In the beginning of 2007, Guilherme served as first club Marília's director of football, with the side in the Série B, being later an assistant and interim coach. He subsequently joined another former team, Atlético Mineiro, being named assistant coach alongside Nei Pandolfo and Freddy Rincón.

On 21 February 2011, Guilherme was hired as Ipatinga's head coach. On 21 June 2013, after a successful spell back at Marília, he was named in charge of Grêmio Novorizontino, being crowned champions of the following year's Campeonato Paulista Série A3.

After achieving a first ever promotion to the Campeonato Paulista in 2015, Guilherme was appointed at the helm of Vila Nova on 14 June 2016. He departed the club in November, after being confirmed as head coach of Linense for the 2017 Campeonato Paulista.

Sacked by Linense on 20 February 2017, Guilherme agreed to become the head coach of Portuguesa on 23 November. He resigned from the latter on 6 February 2018, taking over Paysandu on 14 July but being dismissed on 25 August.

On 3 February 2020, after more than a year unemployed, Guilherme returned to Marília after being appointed head coach. He was sacked on 17 April 2023, after four seasons and nearly 50 matches in charge.

On 26 January 2024, Guilherme was named head coach of Velo Clube. He led the club to the year's Campeonato Paulista Série A2 title, and renewed his contract on 22 May before joining Água Santa on 10 June, in a temporary deal.

Back to Velo for the 2025 Campeonato Paulista, Guilherme avoided relegation with the club before agreeing to join Amazonas on 19 April of that year. On 6 July, he was sacked.

== Career statistics ==
=== Club ===
Appearances and goals by club, season and competition
Club	Season	League			State league		Cup		Continental		Other		Total	
Club	Season	Division	Apps	Goals	Apps	Goals	Apps	Goals	Apps	Goals	Apps	Goals	Apps	Goals
Marília	1992	Série C	6	2	17	3	—		—		—		23	5
Marília	1993	Série C	0	0	27	9	—		—		—		27	9
Marília	Total		6	2	34	12	—		—		—		40	14
São Paulo	1993	Série A	4	2	—		—		1 (Note: Appearance(s) in Supercopa Libertadores)	0	2 (Note: Appearance(s) in Copa de Oro)	0	7	2
São Paulo	1994	Série A	3	0	18	8	—		—		5 (Note: One appearance and one goal in Recopa Sudamericana, four appearances and one goal in Copa Bandeirantes)	2	26	10
São Paulo	Total		7	2	18	8	—		1	0	7	2	33	12
Rayo Vallecano	1994–95	Segunda División	17	14	—		2	0	—		—		19	14
Rayo Vallecano	1995–96	La Liga	34	10	—		3	0	—		2	1	39	11
Rayo Vallecano	1996–97	La Liga	38	14	—		6	4	—		2	0	46	18
Rayo Vallecano	Total		89	38	—		11	4	—		4	1	104	43
Grêmio	1997	Série A	9	9	—		—		5	3	—		14	12
Grêmio	1998	Série A	6	1	6	6	4	1	10 (Note: Nine appearances and five goals in Copa Libertadores, one appearance and one goal in Copa Mercosur)	6	—		26	14
Grêmio	Total		15	10	6	6	4	1	15	9	—		40	26
Vasco da Gama	1998	Série A	0	0	—		—		—		3 (Note: Two appearances in Copa Interamericana, one appearance in Intercontinental Cup)	0	3	0
Vasco da Gama	1999	Série A	0	0	2	0	3	2	1 (Note: Appearance(s) in Copa Libertadores)	1	7 (Note: Appearance(s) in Torneio Rio-São Paulo)	6	13	9
Vasco da Gama	Total		0	0	2	0	3	2	1	1	10	6	16	9
Atlético Mineiro	1999	Série A	27	28	—		—		—		—		27	28
Atlético Mineiro	2000	Série A	15	9	11	7	6	3	18 (Note: Ten appearances and nine goals in Copa Libertadores, eight appearances and five goals in Copa Mercosur)	14	4 (Note: Appearance(s) in Copa Sul-Minas)	1	54	34
Atlético Mineiro	2001	Série A	24	10	14	10	3	4	—		7	8	48	32
Atlético Mineiro	2002	Série A	0	0	4	0	9	3	—		19 (Note: Sixteen appearances and eight goals in Copa Sul-Minas, three appearances and four goals in Copa dos Campeões)	12	32	15
Atlético Mineiro	2003	Série A	22	8	11	13	8	6	1 (Note: Appearance(s) in Copa Sudamericana)	1	—		42	28
Atlético Mineiro	Total		88	55	40	30	26	16	19	15	30	21	203	137
Corinthians (loan)	2002	Série A	19	13	—		—		—		—		19	13
Al-Ittihad	2003–04	Saudi Premier League	6	5	—		—		—		—		6	5
Cruzeiro	2004	Série A	20	2	10	8	—		9 (Note: Seven appearances and four goals in Copa Libertadores, two appearances in Copa Sudamericana)	4	—		39	14
Botafogo	2005	Série A	18	1	9	5	3	0	—		—		30	6
Career total			268	128	119	69	44	23	45	29	51	30	527	279

=== International ===
Appearances and goals by national team and year
National team	Year	Apps	Goals
Brazil	2000	2	0
Brazil	2001	4	1
Total		6	1

=== International goals ===
#	Date	Venue	Opponent	Score	Result	Competition
1.	15 July 2001	Pascual Guerrero, Cali, Colombia	Peru	1–0	2–0	2001 Copa América

== Coaching statistics ==
As of 6 July 2025

Coaching record by team and tenure
Team	Nat	From	To	Record								Ref
Team	Nat	From	To	G	W	D	L	GF	GA	GD	Win %	Ref
Ipatinga	(Brazil)	21 February 2011	10 December 2011	41	18	7	16	61	55	+6	43.90	
Marília	(Brazil)	4 January 2012	9 July 2012	28	10	3	15	35	51	−16	35.71	
Novorizontino	(Brazil)	18 December 2013	1 June 2016	61	30	19	12	110	81	+29	49.18	
Vila Nova	(Brazil)	14 June 2016	30 November 2016	27	10	7	10	34	27	+7	37.04	
Linense	(Brazil)	9 November 2016	20 February 2017	4	1	0	3	5	13	−8	25.00	
Portuguesa	(Brazil)	22 November 2017	6 February 2018	5	1	1	3	3	7	−4	20.00	
Paysandu	(Brazil)	14 July 2018	25 August 2018	8	2	2	4	6	10	−4	25.00	
Marília	(Brazil)	7 February 2020	17 April 2023	100	46	24	30	134	102	+32	46.00	
Velo Clube	(Brazil)	26 January 2024	15 April 2024	18	8	6	4	20	14	+6	44.44	
Água Santa	(Brazil)	11 June 2024	7 August 2024	9	4	1	4	7	9	−2	44.44	
Velo Clube	(Brazil)	14 January 2025	17 April 2025	12	3	4	5	13	16	−3	25.00	
Amazonas	(Brazil)	23 April 2025	present	11	3	4	4	11	14	−3	27.27	
Total				324	136	78	110	439	400	+39	41.98	—

== Honours ==
=== Player ===
São Paulo

- Copa Libertadores: 1993
- Supercopa Libertadores: 1993
- Recopa Sudamericana: 1993, 1994
- Copa CONMEBOL: 1994

Vasco da Gama

- Torneio Rio – São Paulo: 1999

Atlético Mineiro

- Campeonato Mineiro: 1999, 2000

Cruzeiro

- Campeonato Mineiro: 2004

=== Coach ===
Novorizontino

- Campeonato Paulista Série A3: 2014

Velo Clube

- Campeonato Paulista Série A2: 2024
