= Murilo Engelmann =

Brazilian footballer

Murilo
Personal information
- Full name: Eliezer Murilo Engelmann
- Date of birth: 19 November 1973 (age 52)
- Place of birth: Santo Antônio da Patrulha, Brazil
- Height: 1.88 m (6 ft 2 in)
- Position: Goalkeeper

Youth career
- 1991–1994: Grêmio

Senior career*
Years	Team	Apps	(Gls)
1994–1999	Grêmio	117	(0)
2000–2003	Fluminense	140	(0)
2004	Juventude		
2005–2006	São José-RS		
- * Club domestic league appearances and goals as of 30 November 2023

Eliezer Murilo Engelmann (born 19 November 1973), better known as Murilo or Murilo Engelmann, is a Brazilian former professional footballer who played as a goalkeeper.

== Career ==
A graduate of Grêmio, Murilo was part of the champion teams in the 90s, even though he was Danrlei backup most of the time. Entered during the match in the 1996 Recopa Sudamericana. In 2000, he went to Fluminense where he was a starter and featured for a few years, becoming Rio champion in 2002. He also played for Juventude and São José.

== Personal life ==
He currently owns a pizzeria in Porto Alegre.

== Honours ==
Grêmio

- Copa Libertadores: 1995
- Copa do Brasil: 1994, 1997
- Campeonato Brasileiro: 1996
- Recopa Sudamericana: 1996
- Campeonato Gaúcho: 1995, 1996, 1999
- Copa Sul: 1999

Fluminense

- Campeonato Carioca: 2002
