= Gilmar (footballer, born 1971) =

Brazilian footballer (born 1971)

Personal information
- Full name: Gilmar Jorge Alberto dos Santos
- Date of birth: 23 April 1971 (age 55)
- Place of birth: São Paulo, Brazil
- Height: 1.86 m (6 ft 1 in)
- Position: Centre-back

Youth career
- 1984–1987: Itaquaquecetuba AC

Senior career*
Years	Team	Apps	(Gls)
1988	Itaquaquecetuba AC		
1989–1996	São Paulo	150	(5)
1991	→ São Bento (loan)		
1995	→ Portuguesa (loan)		
1996	Cruzeiro	31	(2)
1996–2000	Real Zaragoza	49	(0)
2000	Rayo Vallecano	3	(0)
2000	Palmeiras	29	(1)
2001	Flamengo	12	(0)
2002–2003	Botafogo	36	(4)
- * Club domestic league appearances and goals as of 25 August 2023

Gilmar Jorge Alberto dos Santos (born 23 April 1971), simply known as Gilmar, is a Brazilian former professional footballer who played as a centre-back. He disputed 150 matches for São Paulo FC, participating in the conquest of several titles.

== Personal life ==
Gilmar is married to gospel singer Aline Barros.

== Honours ==
=== São Paulo ===
- Campeonato Paulista: 1991, 1992
- Campeonato Brasileiro: 1991
- Copa Libertadores: 1993
- Intercontinental Cup: 1993
- Supercopa Libertadores: 1993
- Recopa Sudamericana: 1993, 1994
- Copa CONMEBOL: 1994
- Copa Masters CONMEBOL: 1996

=== Cruzeiro ===
- Campeonato Mineiro: 1996
- Copa do Brasil: 1996

=== Palmeiras ===
- Copa dos Campeões: 2000

=== Flamengo ===
- Taça Guanabara: 2001
- Campeonato Carioca: 2001
- Copa dos Campeões: 2001
