= Valdeir (footballer, born 1967) =

Brazilian footballer

Personal information
- Full name: Valdeir Celso Moreira
- Date of birth: 31 December 1967
- Place of birth: Goiânia, Brazil
- Positions: Midfielder; striker

Senior career*
Years	Team	Apps	(Gls)
–1989	Atlético Goianiense		
1989-1992	Botafogo		
1992-1996	Bordeaux	62	(16)
1993-1994	→ São Paulo (loan)	23	(7)
1995-1996	→ Flamengo (loan)		
1997	Atlético Mineiro		
1997	Guarani		
1998	Inter de Limeira		
1999	Paraná		
2000	Ceará		
2000	Vila Nova		
2001	Madureira		
2002	Brasiliense		
2003	Madureira		

International career
1990-1993	Brazil	16	(0)
- * Club domestic league appearances and goals

Valdeir Celso Moreira (born 31 December 1967 in Brazil) is a Brazilian retired footballer.

== Career ==
He was nicknamed "The Flash" for his speed.

From 1992 to 1996, Valdeir played for Bordeaux in the French Ligue 1. There, he was teammates with Zinedine Zidane, who he unsuccessfully tried to make dance Samba for a goal celebration.

== Honours ==
São Paulo

- Intercontinental Cup: 1993
- Supercopa Libertadores: 1993
- Recopa Sudamericana: 1993
