= Palhinha (footballer, born 1967) =

Brazilian footballer

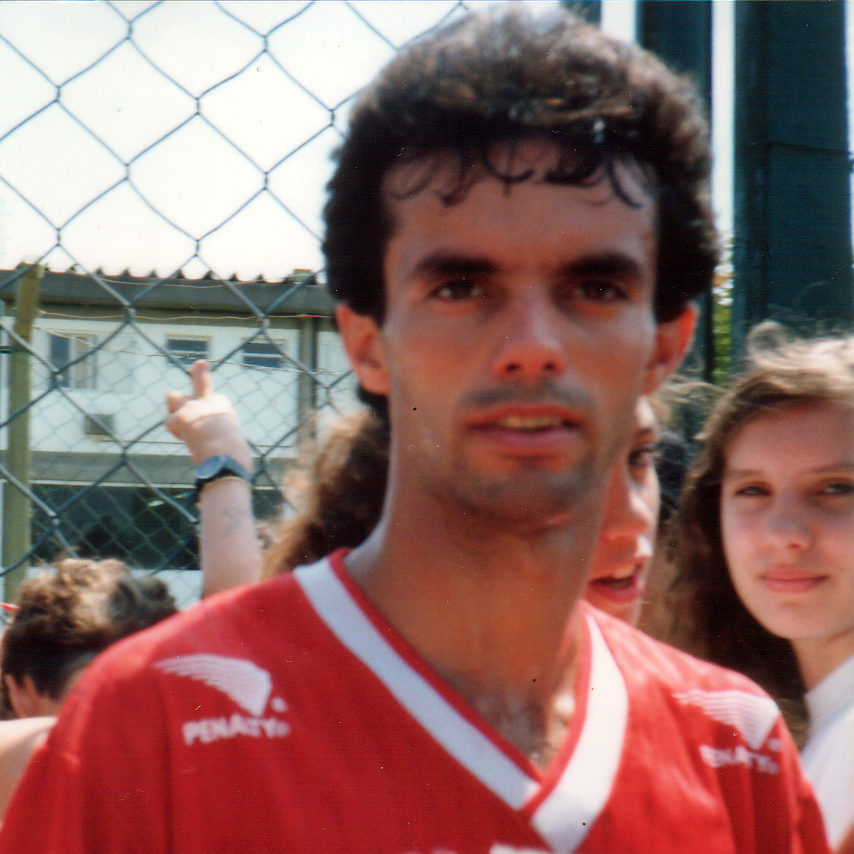
- Palhinha in 1993

Personal information
- Full name: Jorge Ferreira da Silva
- Date of birth: 14 December 1967 (age 58)
- Place of birth: Carangola, Minas Gerais, Brazil
- Height: 1.73 m (5 ft 8 in)
- Positions: Attacking midfielder; second striker

Senior career*
Years	Team	Apps	(Gls)
1988–1991	América (MG)		
1992–1995	São Paulo	232	(71)
1996–1997	Cruzeiro	26	(10)
1997	Mallorca	9	(0)
1998	Flamengo		
1998–1999	Grêmio	7	(1)
1999	Botafogo-SP	11	(2)
2000	América (MG)		
2000	Sporting Cristal		
2001	Gama	9	(2)
2001	Alianza Lima		
2002	Marília		
2002	América (MG)		
2003	Khaimah Sports		
2003	Uberaba		
2004	Bandeirante		
2004	Ipatinga		
2005	Chapecoense		
2005	Farroupilha		
2006	Guarulhos		

International career
1992–1993	Brazil	16	(5)
- * Club domestic league appearances and goals

Jorge Ferreira da Silva (born 14 December 1967 in Carangola, Minas Gerais), commonly known as Palhinha, is a retired Brazilian footballer who played as an attacking midfielder or as a forward.

== Clubs career ==
Palhinha played for São Paulo in the golden years of 1992 and 1993 – alongside star players like Raí, Leonardo, Toninho Cerezo, Cafu and Müller – to win the Copa Libertadores and Intercontinental Cup twice, in 1992 and 1993. In 1992, he also was the top scorer of the Copa Libertadores, with 7 goals.

He also conquered the São Paulo State Championship in 1992 against the Palmeiras, and later became the double champions of Recopa Sudamericana in 1993 and 1994 against Cruzeiro and Botafogo, respectively. Moreover, he helped São Paulo beat Flamengo to triumph Supercopa Libertadores in 1993.

In 2001, he helped Alianza Lima to win the Apertura Championship in its centennial year. This feat was obtained under Brazilian manager Paulo Autuori.

With Cruzeiro he again won the Copa Libertadores in 1997.

== International career ==
During his golden era at São Paulo, Palhinha was selected to Brazil national team. He played for his country for 16 times, but was not managed to be selected again since 1993.

== Honours ==
=== Club ===
São Paulo

- Campeonato Paulista: 1992
- Copa Libertadores: 1992, 1993
- Intercontinental Cup: 1992, 1993
- Recopa Sudamericana: 1993, 1994
- Supercopa Libertadores: 1993
- Copa Conmebol: 1994

Cruzeiro

- Campeonato Mineiro: 1996, 1997
- Copa Brasil: 1996
- Copa Libertadores: 1997

Grêmio

- Campeonato Gaúcho: 1999

América-MG

- Copa Sul-Minas: 2000

Alianza Lima

- Peruvian Primera División: 2001

Marília

- Campeonato Paulista Série A2: 2002

=== Individual ===
- Campeonato Paulista top scorer: 1992
- Copa Libertadores's top scorer: 1992
