= 1994 Recopa Sudamericana =

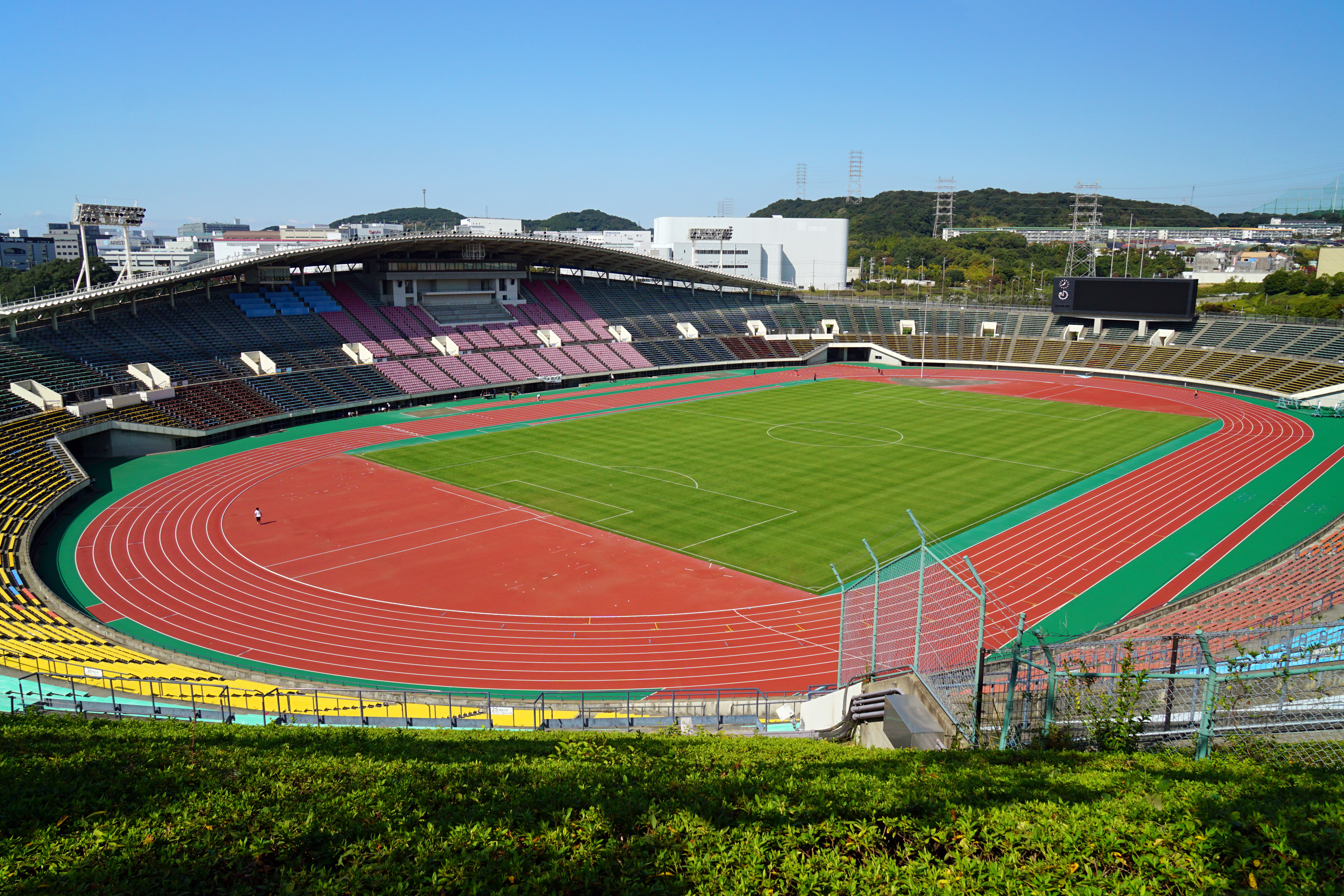
- Kobe Universiade Memorial Stadium, venue
- Event: Recopa Sudamericana
São Paulo	Botafogo
(Brazil)	(Brazil)
3	1
- Date: April 3, 1994
- Venue: Universiade Memorial Stadium, Kobe
- Referee: Juan Escobar (Paraguay)

The 1994 Recopa Sudamericana was the sixth Recopa Sudamericana, an annual football match between the winners of the previous season's Copa Libertadores and Supercopa Sudamericana competitions. This year's edition pitted the defending champions São Paulo against compatriots Botafogo in a second, consecutive all-Brazilian final. Since São Paulo won both the 1993 Copa Libertadores and 1993 Supercopa Sudamericana, CONMEBOL invited Botafogo, winners of the 1993 Copa CONMEBOL, to participate in order to make this year's Recopa doable.

São Paulo successfully defends the trophy as they defeated Botafogo 3-1 in Kobe Universiade Memorial Stadium of Kobe to become the first ever team to win consecutive titles. Juan Escobar Valdez became the first referee to direct two finals of the competition (having already done so in 1992).

== Qualified teams ==
Team	Previous finals app.
(Brazil) São Paulo	**1993**
(Brazil) Botafogo	None

Bold indicates winning years

== Match details ==
1994 Recopa Sudamericana
April 3, 1994

São Paulo (Brazil)	3–1	(Brazil) Botafogo
Leonardo 12'; Guilherme 73'; Euller 87'	Report	Roberto Cavalo 68' (pen.)

Universiade Memorial Stadium, Kobe
Referee: Juan Escobar (Paraguay)

**São Paulo**	**Botafogo**

GK	1	(Brazil) Zetti
DF	2	(Brazil) Vítor
DF	4	(Brazil) Júnior Baiano
DF	3	(Brazil) Válber
DF	6	(Brazil) André Luiz
MF	5	(Brazil) Doriva
MF	8	(Brazil) Cafu	(substituted off) 88'
MF	9	(Brazil) Palhinha	(substituted off) 59'
MF	10	(Brazil) Leonardo
FW	7	(Brazil) Euller
FW	11	(Brazil) Guilherme
Substitutes:
MF	15	(Brazil) Juninho Paulista	(substituted in) 59'
DF	14	(Brazil) Axel	(substituted in) 88'
Manager:
(Brazil) Telê Santana

GK	(Brazil) Wagner
DF	(Brazil) Perivaldo
DF	(Brazil) André Santos
DF	(Brazil) Wilson Gottardo
DF	(Brazil) Eduardo
MF	(Brazil) Fabiano	(substituted off) 46'
MF	(Brazil) Márcio Borges
MF	(Brazil) Roberto Cavalo
MF	(Brazil) Grizzo	(substituted off) 77'
FW	(Brazil) Túlio
FW	(Brazil) Sérgio Manoel
Substitutes:
FW	(Brazil) Róbson	(substituted in) 46'
FW	(Brazil) Marcelo Carioca	(substituted in) 77'
Manager:
(Brazil) Dé
