= Vaguinho (footballer, born 1969) =

Brazilian footballer

Personal information
- Full name: Vágner dos Santos
- Date of birth: 15 October 1969 (age 57)
- Place of birth: Bauru, Brazil
- Positions: Defender; midfielder

Senior career*
Years	Team	Apps	(Gls)
1989–1990	Rio Branco-SP		
1991	São José-SP		
1991	Catanduvense		
1992	Noroeste		
1992–1995	São Paulo	19	(5)
1994	→ Castellón (loan)		
1995	Bragantino		
1995	Araçatuba		
1996	Paraná		
1996–1998	Guarani		
1999	Ponte Preta		
2000	São José-SP		
2001	Joseense		
2001	Rio Branco-SP		

Managerial career
- 2013: Criciúma (assistant)
- 2014: Ponte Preta (assistant)
- 2014–2016: Brazil women (assistant)
- 2017: Guarani (assistant)
- 2017–2019: Brazil women (assistant)
- 2021: Penarol-AM
- 2023: Colorado Caieiras
- 2024: Rio Branco-AC
- 2024: Araçatuba
- 2025: Pinheiro-MA
- 2025: Araçatuba
- 2026: Rio Claro
- 2026: Noroeste (assistant)
- 2026: Noroeste
- * Club domestic league appearances and goals

Vágner dos Santos (born 15 October 1969), commonly known as Vaguinho, is a Brazilian football coach and former player who played as a defender or a midfielder.

== Career ==
As a player, he played for several teams in the interior of São Paulo, in addition to São Paulo FC where he was champion of the Libertadores and Copa CONMEBOL, and in Paraná where he won a state championship.

== Coaching career ==
Vaguinho started as an assistant to coach Vadão in his work from 2013 onwards. As a manager, he worked at Penarol-AM and Colorado Caieras.

In 2024, Vaguinho gained the promotion with AE Araçatuba to Campeonato Paulista Série A4, coaching the club again in 2025 season, after a period at Pinheiro-MA.

== Honours ==
São Paulo

- Copa Libertadores: 1993
- Copa CONMEBOL: 1994

Paraná

- Campeonato Paranaense: 1996
