= 1993 Recopa Sudamericana =

| São Paulo | Cruzeiro |
| (Brazil) | (Brazil) |
| 0 | 0 |

First leg
| São Paulo | Cruzeiro |
| 0 | 0 |
- São Paulo won the penalty shootout 4–2
- Date: September 26, 1993
- Venue: Estádio do Morumbi, São Paulo
- Referee: Renato Marsiglia (Brazil)
- Attendance: 12,974

Second leg
| Cruzeiro | São Paulo |
| 0 | 0 |
- Date: September 29, 1993
- Venue: Mineirão, Belo Horizonte
- Referee: Jorge Nieves (Uruguay)
- Attendance: 20,000

The 1993 Recopa Sudamericana was the fifth Recopa Sudamericana, an annual football match between the winners of the previous season's Copa Libertadores and Supercopa Sudamericana competitions. This year's edition became the first final to be disputed between two clubs from the same nation and the second in South American club competitions. Due to schedule congestion, the first leg was played as part of the Campeonato Brasileiro.

The series was contested between São Paulo, winners of the 1992 Copa Libertadores, and Cruzeiro, winners of the 1992 Supercopa Sudamericana, in a two-legged series. Coached by the illustrious Telê Santana, São Paulo came away with the title after defeating Cruzeiro, appearing in their second consecutive final, 4–2 on penalties after a 0–0 tie to obtain the trophy for the first time. This became the 4th international title for São Paulo's golden generation. The series became notable as the legendary Ronaldo competed in an international competition for the first time ever only to fail to score during the penalty shoot-out.

== Qualified teams ==
| Team | Previous finals app. |
|---|---|
| (Brazil) São Paulo | None |
| (Brazil) Cruzeiro | 1992 |

Bold indicates winning years

== Venues ==
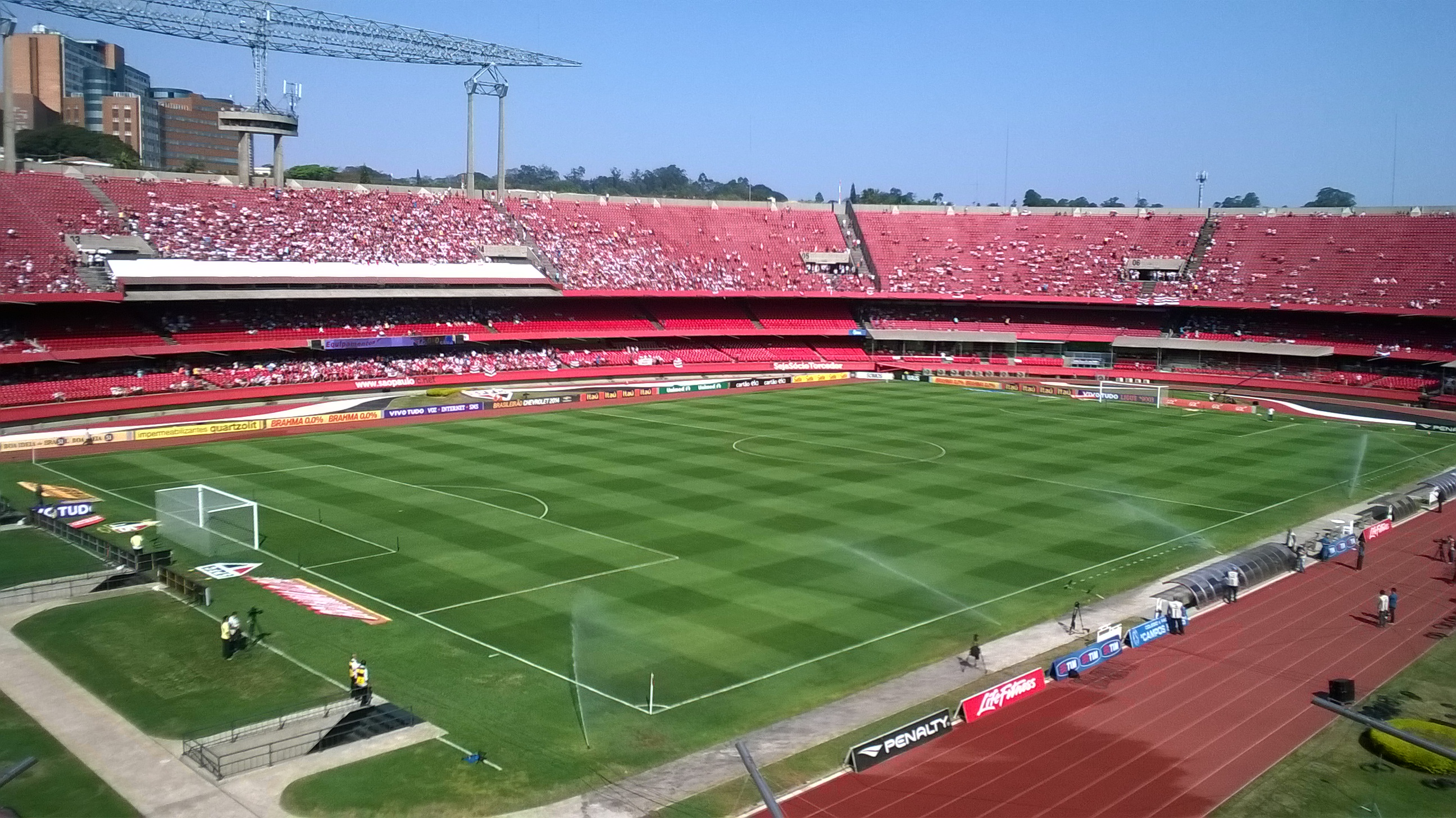
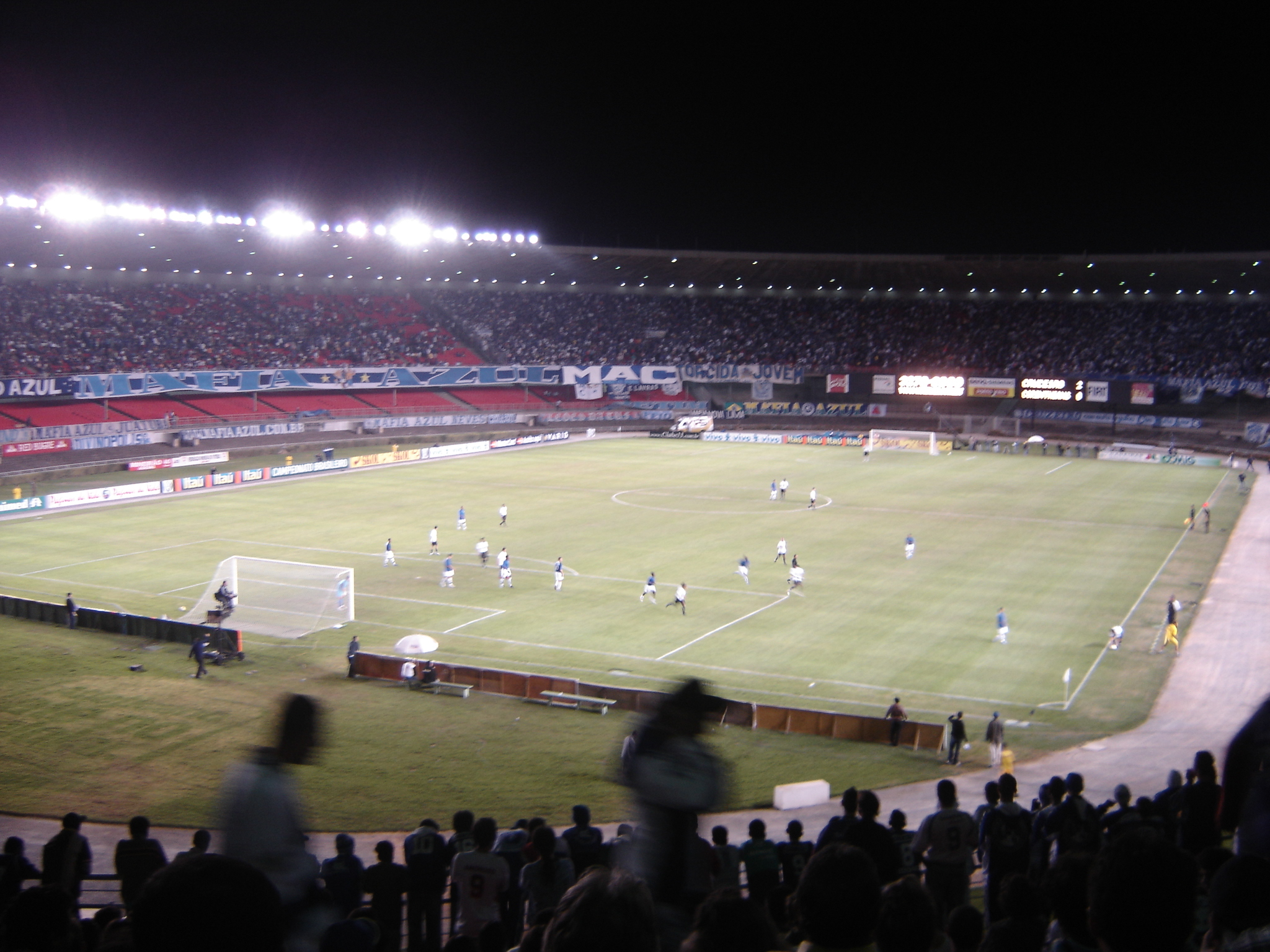
Estádio do Morumbi (left) and Mineirão, venues of the series

== Match details ==
=== First leg ===
1993 Recopa Sudamericana
September 26, 1993
First leg

| São Paulo (Brazil) | 0–0 | (Brazil) Cruzeiro |
|---|---|---|
| | Report |

Estádio do Morumbi, São Paulo
Attendance: 12,974
Referee: Renato Marsiglia (Brazil)

| **São Paulo** | **Cruzeiro** |

| GK | 1 | (Brazil) Zetti |
| DF | 10 | (Brazil) Cafu |
| DF | 13 | (Brazil) Gilmar | Booked |
| DF | 3 | (Brazil) Válber |
| DF | 14 | (Brazil) Ronaldo Luiz |
| MF | 5 | (Brazil) Dinho | Booked |
| MF | 8 | (Brazil) Toninho Cerezo |
| MF | 9 | (Brazil) Palhinha | Booked |
| MF | 6 | (Brazil) Leonardo | | (substituted off) ?b' |
| FW | 18 | (Brazil) Guilherme | Booked | (substituted off) ?a' |
| FW | 11 | (Brazil) Valdeir |
Substitutes:
| MF | 15 | (Brazil) Juninho Paulista | | (substituted on) ?a' |
| DF | 21 | (Brazil) André Luiz | | (substituted on) ?b' |
Manager:
(Brazil) Telê Santana

GK
DF
DF
DF
DF
MF
MF
MF
MF
FW
FW
Substitutes:
MF
FW
Manager:
(Brazil) Carlos Alberto Silva

(Brazil) Sérgio
(Brazil) Paulo Roberto
(Brazil) Robson | Booked
(Brazil) Luizinho
(Brazil) Nonato
(Brazil) Ademir | (substituted off) ?a'
(Brazil) Rogério Lage | Booked
(Brazil) Boiadeiro
(Brazil) Luís Fernando
(Brazil) Macedo | (substituted off) ?b'
(Brazil) Ronaldo
(Brazil) Douglas | (substituted on) ?a'
(Brazil) Careca | (substituted on) ?b'

=== Second leg ===
1993-09-29
Second leg

| Cruzeiro (Brazil) | 0–0 | (Brazil) São Paulo |
|---|---|---|
| | Report |
Penalties
| Paulo Roberto (penalty missed); Ronaldo (penalty missed); Luís Fernando (penalty scored); Ademir (penalty scored) | 2–4 | (penalty scored) Dinho; (penalty scored) Cafu; (penalty scored) Válber; (penalty scored) Ronaldão |

Mineirão, Belo Horizonte
Attendance: 20,000
Referee: Jorge Nieves (Uruguay)

| **Cruzeiro** | **São Paulo** |

| GK | (Brazil) Sérgio |
| DF | (Brazil) Paulo Roberto |
| DF | (Brazil) Robson |
| DF | (Brazil) Luizinho | (substituted off) ?a' |
| DF | (Brazil) Nonato |
| MF | (Brazil) Ademir |
| MF | (Brazil) Rogério Lage |
| MF | (Brazil) Boiadeiro |
| MF | (Brazil) Luís Fernando |
| FW | (Brazil) Macedo | (substituted off) ?b' |
| FW | (Brazil) Ronaldo |
Substitutes:
| DF | (Brazil) Célio Lúcio | (substituted on) ?a' |
| FW | (Brazil) Careca | (substituted on) ?b' |
Manager:
(Brazil) Carlos Alberto Silva

| GK | 1 | (Brazil) Zetti |
| DF | 3 | (Brazil) Válber |
| DF | 13 | (Brazil) Gilmar |
| DF | 4 | (Brazil) Ronaldão |
| DF | 21 | (Brazil) André Luiz |
| MF | 5 | (Brazil) Dinho |
| MF | 8 | (Brazil) Toninho Cerezo |
| MF | 10 | (Brazil) Cafu |
| MF | 15 | (Brazil) Juninho Paulista |
| FW | 9 | (Brazil) Palhinha | (substituted off) ?a' |
| FW | 11 | (Brazil) Valdeir | (substituted off) ?b' |
Substitutes:
| FW | 16 | (Brazil) Catê | (substituted on) ?a' |
| MF | 22 | (Brazil) Jamelli | (substituted on) ?b' |
Manager:
(Brazil) Telê Santana
