= Válber (footballer, born 1967) =

Brazilian footballer

Personal information
- Full name: Válber Roel de Oliveira
- Date of birth: 31 May 1967 (age 59)
- Place of birth: Rio de Janeiro, Brazil
- Height: 1.77 m (5 ft 10 in)
- Positions: Centre-back; left-back; defensive midfielder

Senior career*
| Years | Team | Apps | (Gls) |
| 1988–1989 | São Cristóvão | | |
| 1990 | Fluminense | 3 | (0) |
| 1991–1992 | Botafogo | 33 | (2) |
| 1992–1994 | São Paulo | 40 | (3) |
| 1995–1996 | → Flamengo (loan) | 5 | (0) |
| 1996–1997 | São Paulo | | |
| 1997–2000 | Vasco da Gama | 68 | (1) |
| 1999 | → Botafogo (loan) | 1 | (0) |
| 1999 | → Fluminense (loan) | | |
| 2001 | Coritiba | | |
| 2001 | Santos | 8 | (1) |
| 2002 | Fluminense | 4 | (0) |
| 2003 | Inter de Limeira | | |
| 2003–2004 | Barretos | | |
| 2005 | Guanabara | | |
| 2006–2008 | America (RJ) | | |

International career
| 1992–1993 | Brazil | 12 | (0) |

Managerial career
- 2014: Audax Rio
- 2018–2019: Fluminense U20 (assistant)
- 2025-: America (RJ) (assistant)
- * Club domestic league appearances and goals

Válber Roel de Oliveira, simply known as Válber (born 31 March 1967 in Rio de Janeiro), is a Brazilian former association footballer who played primarily as centre-back. He played for the Brazil national team and played for several Brasileirão Série A clubs. He won the Copa Libertadores twice in his career with two different teams, first with Sao Paulo in the 1993 Copa Libertadores & with Vasco da Gama in the 1998 Copa Libertadores.

== Honours ==
São Paulo

- Copa Libertadores: 1993
- Intercontinental Cup: 1992, 1993
- Recopa Sudamericana: 1993, 1994
- Supercopa Sudamericana: 1993
- Campeonato Paulista: 1992

Flamengo

- Campeonato Carioca: 1996

Vasco da Gama

- Campeonato Brasileiro Série A: 1997
- Copa Libertadores: 1998
- Campeonato Carioca: 1998

Fluminense

- Campeonato Brasileiro Série C: 1999
