= André Luiz (footballer, born 1974) =

Brazilian footballer

Personal information
- Full name: André Luiz Moreira
- Date of birth: 14 November 1974 (age 51)
- Place of birth: São Paulo, Brazil
- Height: 1.83 m (6 ft 0 in)
- Position: Attacking midfielder

Youth career
- 1991–1992: São Paulo

Senior career*
Years	Team	Apps	(Gls)
1993–1996	São Paulo	90	(9)
1997	Corinthians	14	(3)
1997–2002	Tenerife	35	(2)
1999	→ Cruzeiro (loan)	18	(1)
2000	→ Corinthians (loan)	13	(1)
2001–2002	→ Marseille (loan)	22	(2)
2002–2003	Paris Saint-Germain	17	(1)
2003	→ Corinthians (loan)	22	(0)
2004	Fluminense	3	(0)
2004–2006	Ajaccio	54	(6)
2006	Santos	13	(0)
2007–2009	Jaguares	55	(5)
2009–2011	San Jose Earthquakes	16	(0)

International career
1995–1997	Brazil	19	(2)
Medal record
Representing Brazil
Men's Football
Bronze medal – third place	1996 Atlanta	Team competition
- * Club domestic league appearances and goals

André Luiz Moreira (born 14 November 1974), known as just André Luiz, is a Brazilian former professional footballer who played as an attacking midfielder.

== Club career ==
André Luiz was born in São Paulo. He began his career in 1993, and played in Brazil for clubs including São Paulo, Corinthians, Cruzeiro, Fluminense. He relocated to Europe 2001 and subsequently played in Spain for Tenerife, and in France for Marseille, Paris Saint-Germain and Ajaccio.

He won the CONMEBOL Supercup, Copa Libertadores and Intercontinental Cup in 1993, two Recopa in 1993 and 1994, and São Paulo State Championship in 1997.

André Luiz signed with San Jose Earthquakes of Major League Soccer on 31 July 2009. He stayed with the club through the 2011 season. In 2012, he finished his career as a soccer player because a knee injury.

== International career ==
André Luiz played 19 matches and scored two goals for the Brazilian team. He won bronze medal at 1996 Summer Olympics.

== Career statistics ==
=== International ===
Appearances and goals by national team and year
National team	Year	Apps	Goals
Brazil	1995	2	0
Brazil	1996	9	2
Brazil	1997	1	0
Total		12	2

Scores and results list Brazil's goal tally first, score column indicates score after each Luiz goal.

List of international goals scored by André Luiz
No.	Date	Venue	Opponent	Score	Result	Competition	Ref.
1	12 January 1996	Los Angeles Memorial Coliseum, Los Angeles, United States	Canada	1–0	4–1	1996 CONCACAF Gold Cup	
2	27 March 1996	Teixeirão, São José do Rio Preto, Brazil	Ghana	3–1	8–2	Friendly	
