= 1996 Recopa Sudamericana =

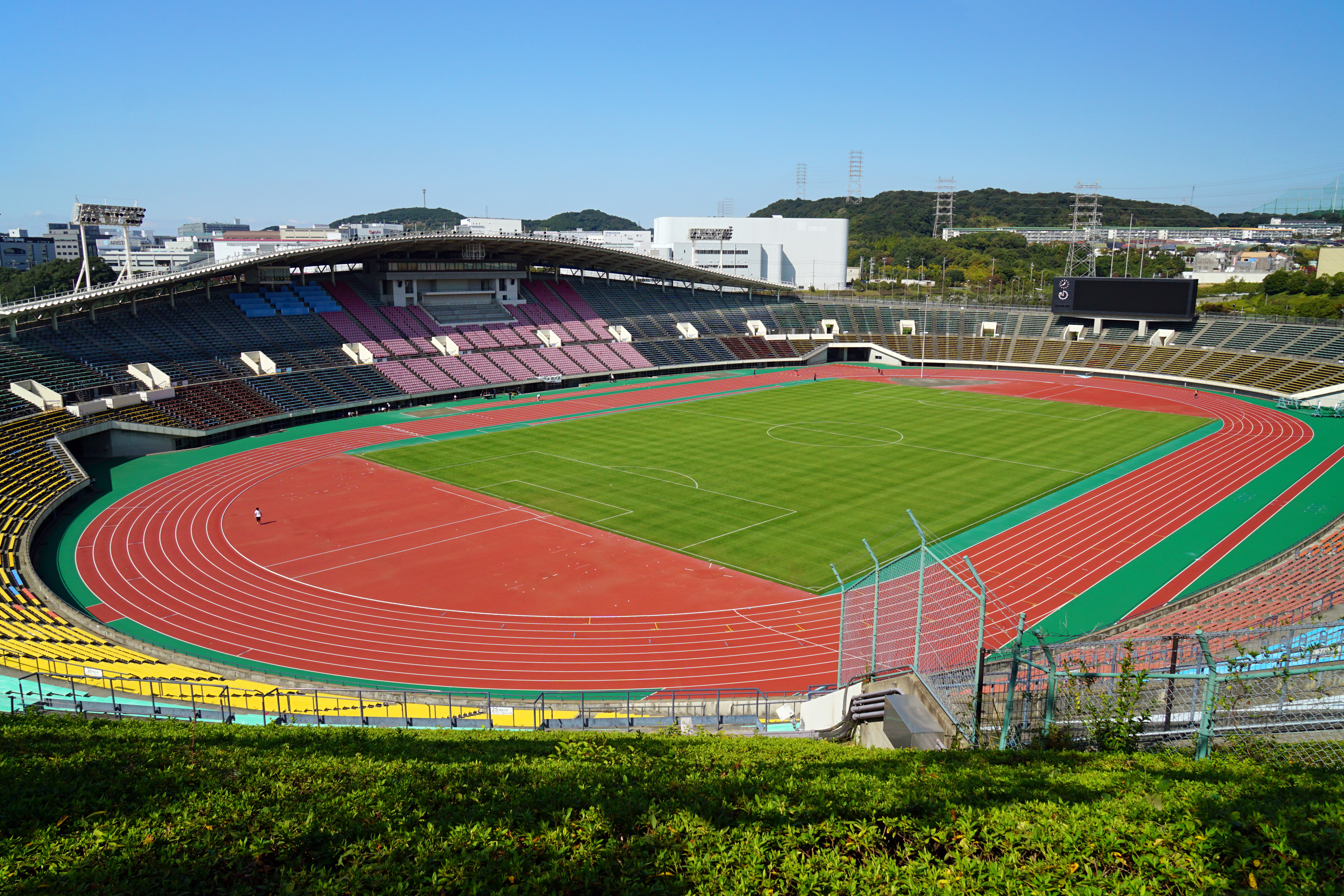
- Kobe Universiade Memorial Stadium, venue
- Event: Recopa Sudamericana
Grêmio	Independiente
(Brazil)	(Argentina)
4	1
- Date: April 7, 1996
- Venue: Universiade Memorial Stadium, Kobe
- Referee: Epifanio González (Paraguay)
- Attendance: 30,000

The 1996 Recopa Sudamericana was the eighth Recopa Sudamericana, an annual football match between the winners of the previous season's Copa Libertadores and Supercopa Sudamericana competitions.

The match was contested between Grêmio, winners of the 1995 Copa Libertadores, and defending champions Independiente, winners of the 1995 Supercopa Sudamericana, on April 7, 1996. Grêmio easily dethroned Independiente after a 4-1 thumping in order to consecrate themselves champions of the competition for the first time.

== Qualified teams ==
Team	Previous finals app.
(Brazil) Grêmio	None
(Argentina) Independiente	**1995**

Bold indicates winning years

== Match details ==
1996 Recopa Sudamericana
April 7, 1996

Grêmio (Brazil)	4–1	(Argentina) Independiente
Jardel 19'; Carlos Miguel 51'; Adílson 68'; Paulo Nunes 80'	Report	Burruchaga 69' (pen.)

Universiade Memorial Stadium, Kobe
Attendance: 30,000
Referee: Epifanio González (Paraguay)

**Grêmio**	**Independiente**

GK	(Brazil) Danrlei	(substituted off) ?a'
DF	(Paraguay) Francisco Arce
DF	(Paraguay) Catalino Rivarola
DF	(Brazil) Adílson
DF	(Brazil) Roger
MF	(Brazil) João Antônio
MF	(Brazil) Goiano
MF	(Brazil) Ailton	(substituted off) ?b'
MF	(Brazil) Carlos Miguel
FW	(Brazil) Paulo Nunes
FW	(Brazil) Jardel	(substituted off) ?c'
Substitutes:
GK	(Brazil) Murilo	(substituted on) ?a'
MF	(Brazil) Emerson	(substituted on) ?b'
FW	(Brazil) Sílvio	(substituted on) ?c'
Manager:
(Brazil) Luiz Felipe Scolari

GK	(Colombia) Faryd Mondragón
DF	(Argentina) Néstor Clausen
DF	(Argentina) Pablo Rotchen
DF	(Argentina) José Serrizuela
DF	(Argentina) Juan Carlos Ramírez	(substituted off) ?a'
MF	(Argentina) Diego Cagna	(substituted off) ?b'
MF	(Paraguay) Roberto Acuña
MF	(Argentina) Cristian Domizzi
FW	(Argentina) Jorge Burruchaga
FW	(Argentina) Javier Mazzoni	(substituted off) ?c'
FW	(Argentina) Roberto Molina
Substitutes:
MF	(Argentina) José Luis Calderón	(substituted on) ?a'
MF	(Argentina) Carlos Julio Bustos	(substituted on) ?b'
MF	(Uruguay) Gabriel Álvez	(substituted on) ?c'
Manager:
(Uruguay) Gregorio Pérez
