= Recopa Sudamericana =

Annual international club football competition

CONMEBOL Recopa
- Organizer(s): CONMEBOL
- Founded: 1989; 37 years ago
- Region: South America
- Teams: 2
- Related competitions: Copa Libertadores; Copa Sudamericana
- Current champion(s): (Argentina) Lanús (1st title)
- Most championships: (Argentina) Boca Juniors (4 titles)
- Broadcasters: ESPN (Latin America, includes Brazil); List of International broadcasters
- Website: conmebol.com/recopa
- 2026 Recopa Sudamericana

The CONMEBOL Recopa Sudamericana (Portuguese: CONMEBOL Recopa Sul-Americana), also known as Recopa Sudamericana or CONMEBOL Recopa, and simply as Recopa (Spanish: [reˈkopa], Portuguese: [ʁɛˈkɔpɐ]; "Winners' Cup"), is an annual international club football competition organized by CONMEBOL since 1988. It is a match-up between the champions of the previous year's Copa Libertadores and the Copa Sudamericana, South America's premier club competitions.

The competition has had several formats over its lifetime. Initially, the champions of the Copa Libertadores and Supercopa Libertadores contested it. In 1998, the Supercopa Libertadores was discontinued and the Recopa went into a hiatus. The competition has been played with either the presently-used two-legged series or a single match-up at a neutral venue. Together with the aforementioned tournaments, a club has the chance to win the CONMEBOL Treble all in one year or season. However, if the Copa Libertadores and Copa Sudamericana are won by the same team, then according to the Copa Libertadores regulations Article 1.7, both competitions' runners-up will play one or two matches in order to decide the team which will play in the Recopa.

The most recent champion of the competition is Argentine club Lanús, having beaten Brazilian club Flamengo in the 2026 edition. Argentine club Boca Juniors is the most successful club in the cup history, having won the tournament four times. Brazilian clubs have accumulated the most victories with thirteen wins while Brazil has the most different winning teams, with ten clubs having won the title. The cup has been won by 24 clubs, four of which won it consecutively: São Paulo, LDU Quito, Boca Juniors and River Plate successfully defended the title in 1994, 2010, 2006, and 2016, respectively.

== History ==
When the Supercopa Sudamericana was created in 1988, a new continental Super Cup competition in South America became viable. CONMEBOL named the new competition Recopa Sudamericana after the defunct Recopa Sudamericana de Clubes played in 1970 and 1971. The Recopa Sudamericana, disputed between the winners of South America's two premier club competitions, is not related chronologically to the Recopa Sudamericana, created in 1968 which was contested between former South American winners of the Intercontinental Cup, Recopa Sudamericana de Clubes, disputed among Cup winners of South America. The first edition was played in 1989 and pitted Uruguayan club Nacional and Argentinian side Racing. Played on two legs, Nacional managed to win the trophy after winning 4–1 on points. Due to schedule dilemmas and political issues, the 1990 edition was played in Miami between Atlético Nacional and Boca Juniors with the latter winning 0–1. Olimpia of Paraguay would win the Recopa Sudamericana without the need to dispute a match as the Decano won both the Copa Libertadores and Supercopa Sudamericana. CONMEBOL declared Olimpia the automatic winners of the 1991 competition.

In 1992, and from 1994 to 1997, the competition was played in Japan. Colo-Colo of Chile defeated Cruzeiro 5–4 on penalties after a 0–0 tie in the 1992 final. Staying true to the winning ways of the Paulista's golden generation, São Paulo won the 1993 and 1994 finals to become the first team to retain the title. Due to schedule congestion, the 1993 finals were played as part of the Campeonato Brasileiro and it also became the first Recopa to feature two teams from the same nation. In a second, consecutive all-Brazilian final, São Paulo successfully defended the trophy against Botafogo. Since São Paulo won both the Copa Libertadores and Supercopa Sudamericana, CONMEBOL had Copa CONMEBOL winners Botafogo dispute the Recopa Sudamericana only to lose 3–1 to the defending champions.

Argentina managed to emulate their northern neighbors with the 1995 edition being an all-Argentinian affair. Independiente, led by Jorge Burruchaga, managed to consecrate themselves winners after defeating Carlos Bianchi's legendary Vélez Sársfield 1–0 in Tokyo. Independiente participated in a second, consecutive final only to lose the title to Grêmio after being defeated 4–1. The 1997 edition was won by a Vélez Sársfield team that bowed out from the international limelight with their last title. Having failed to win the trophy in 1992 and 1993, Cruzeiro comfortably won the 1998 edition that was played as part of the Copa Mercosur. This final series was played two years after the participating teams won their corresponding qualifying tournaments.

At the end of the 1998 season, CONMEBOL discontinued the Supercopa Sudamericana. As a result of not having an important, secondary tournament, the Recopa Sudamericana went into a hiatus from 1999 until 2002. However, the introduction of the new Copa Sudamericana revitalized the competition with Olimpia winning the 2003 final in Los Angeles. Played on a neutral venue for the second year in a row, Cienciano defeated Boca Juniors on penalties to win their second international title. From 2005 onwards, the Recopa Sudamericana would be played on a home-and-away basis.

In a rematch of the Copa Libertadores final of 2004, Boca Juniors avenged that defeat as they beat Once Caldas 4–3 on aggregate. A year later, Boca Juniors faced São Paulo, both two-time winners of the competition, in order to determine who would become the first tricampeón. The Xeneizes won 4–1 on points and successfully defended the title, becoming the first side since Telê Santana's São Paulo to win consecutive Recopas. Internacional became the first Brazilian side to lift the trophy in nine years. The 2008 competition saw Boca Juniors win their fourth title to become joint leaders for most international titles won by a club in a last hurrah on the international scene. LDU Quito won their second international title as they thumped Internacional 6–0 on points and 4–0 on goal aggregate to win their first ever title. LDU Quito then successfully defended their title in 2010 against Estudiantes. They became the third team to successfully defend the title.

== Format ==
Unlike most other competitions around the world, the Recopa Sudamericana do not use extra time, an additional period of play specified under the rules of a sport to bring a game to a decision and avoid declaring the match a tie or draw, or away goals, a method of breaking ties in football and other sports when teams play each other twice, once at each team's home ground, to decide a tie that was level on aggregate.

From 1988 to 1995, teams would be awarded 2 points for a win, 1 point for a draw and 0 points for a loss). From 1995 onwards, the "three points for a win" standard, a system adopted by FIFA in 1995 that places additional value on wins, was adopted in CONMEBOL, with teams now earning 3 points for a win, 1 point for a draw and 0 points for a loss. If both teams are level on points after two legs, goal difference would come into play. Penalty kicks was used to determine a winner if the match was tied on goal difference.

Since the competition takes place in the mid-winter, it is disputed between the champions of the previous year's aforementioned competitions. Because of this, some count the year of the championship by the qualification year rather than that of the competition itself. Thus, CONMEBOL states that Nacional from Uruguay won the first Recopa of 1989, whereas the RSSSF refers to that championship as Recopa 1988.

== Trophy ==
The Recopa Sudamericana trophy

The Recopa Sudamericana trophy is retained by CONMEBOL at all times. A full-size replica trophy is awarded to the winning club. Thirty gold medals are presented to the winning club and thirty silver medals to the runners-up.

The Recopa Sudamericana trophy has not undergone many changes in its history. The trophy consists of a gold-coated body with a pedestal. The body consists of an Adidas Tango ball, a successful family and brand of association footballs. It was first introduced as the Tango Durlast in 1978 for the 1978 FIFA World Cup in Argentina. The ball is hoisted by a golden, cylindrical body with four quadrilateral edges sticking out of the body at 45 degrees from each other. The pedestal is separated into two parts; the top part of the pedestal consists of the CONMEBOL emblem. The bottom part of the pedestal contains a gold badge underneath the CONMEBOL emblem with the phrase, "RECOPA", imprinted into it. To the left and right, badges of previous winners are placed.

A team which wins 3 times in a row, receives an original copy of the trophy and a special mark of recognition.

== Match ball ==
The current match ball for the Recopa Sudamericana, manufactured by Nike, is named the Total 90 Omni CSF. It is one of the many balls produced by the American sports equipment maker for CONMEBOL, replacing the Mercurial Veloci Hi-Vis in 2009. The ball, approved by FIFA and weighing approximately 422 g, has a spherical shape that allows the ball to fly faster, farther, and more accurately. According to Nike, the ball's geometric precision distributes pressure evenly across panels and around the ball. The compressed polyethylene layer stores energy from impact and releases it at launch, and the 6-wing carbon-latex air chamber improves acceleration. Another feature of the ball is its rubber layer; it was designed to allow a better response while retaining the impact energy and releases it in the coup. Its support material of cross-linked nitrogen-expanded foam improves its retention and durability of its shape. Polyester support fabric enhances structure and stability. The asymmetrical high-contrast graphic around the ball creates an optimal flicker as the ball rotates for a more powerful visual signal, allowing the player to more easily identify and track the ball.

== Sponsorship ==
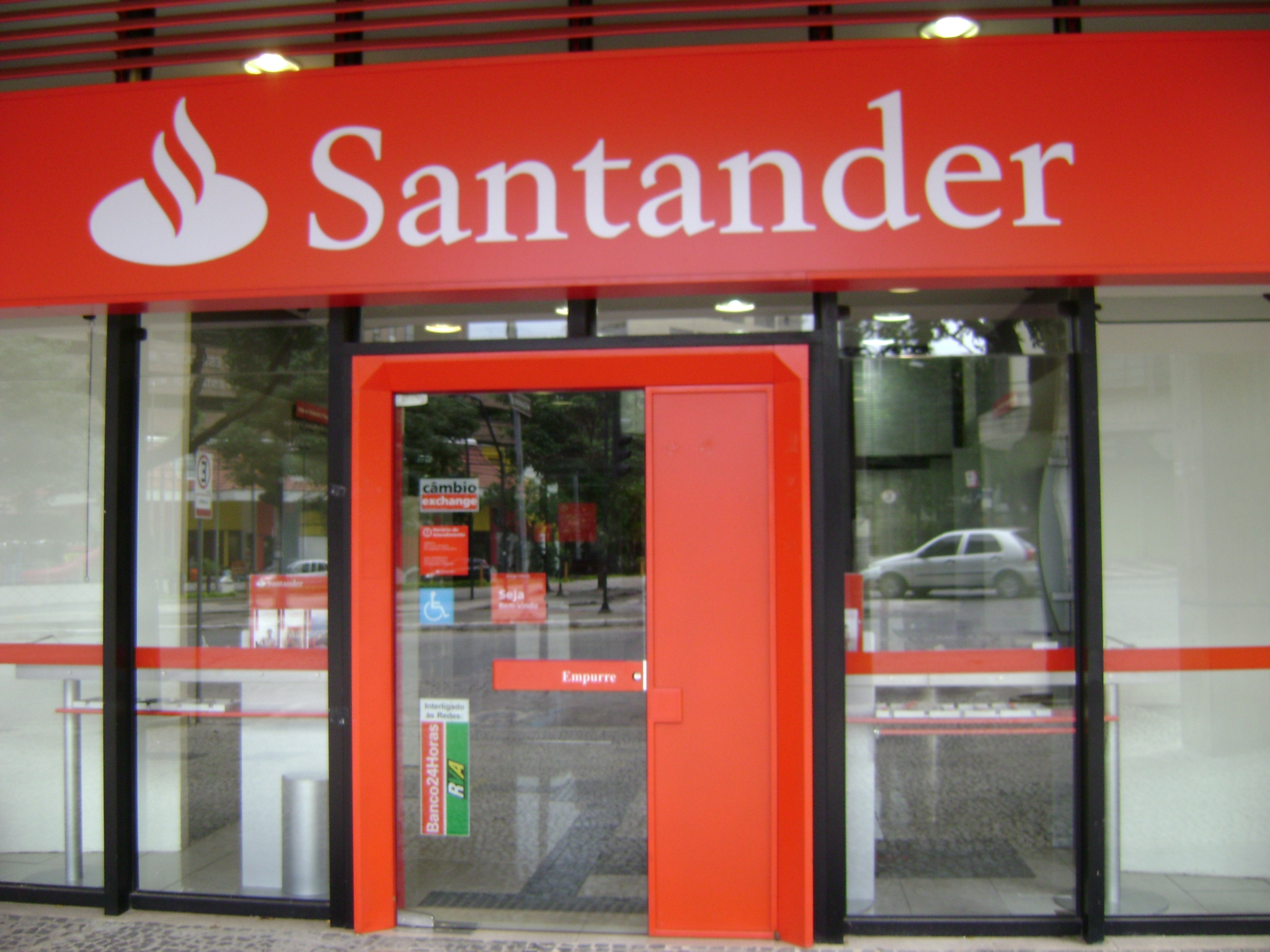
Banco Santander is the primary sponsor of the Recopa Sudamericana

Like the FIFA World Cup, the Recopa Sudamericana is sponsored by a group of multinational corporations. Unlike the premier football tournament forementioned, the competition uses a single, main sponsor; it is currently primarily sponsored by Banco Santander, one of the largest banks in the world. The deal running for a period of three years began with the 2012 edition. As the main sponsor of the tournament, the competition will carry the name of the bank. Thus, the competition is known officially as the '"Copa Santander Libertadores'". The first primary sponsor of the competition was Fox Sports Latinoamérica, a Latin American cable television network focusing on sports-related programming including live and pre-recorded event telecasts, sports talk shows, and other original programmings. The sponsorship was only for the 2005 edition of the competition, being known officially as '"Fox Sports Recopa Sudamericana"'. The second primary sponsor was Visa, an American multinational financial services corporation. The deal ran for a period of 3 years which began with the 2006 edition. As the main sponsor of the tournament, the competition carried the name of the corporation. Thus, the competition was known officially as '"Recopa Visa Sudamericana"'.

However, the competition has had many secondary sponsors that invest in the tournament as well. Many of these sponsors are nationally based but have expanded to other nations. Nike supplies the official match ball, as they do for all other CONMEBOL competitions. Individual clubs may wear jerseys with advertising, even if such sponsors conflict with those of the Recopa Sudamericana.

The tournament's current secondary sponsors and brands advertised (in italic) are:

- Fox Sports
  - Fox Sports Latinoamérica
  - Fox Sports Brasil
  - Fox Deportes
- Diario Crónica
- Efectivo Sí
- Guerrero
- La Nueva Seguros
- Bein TV
- DirecTV
- Easy
- Polacrin
- Rapipago
- Reebok
- Coca-Cola
- Budweiser
- Tarjeta Naranja

== Records and statistics ==
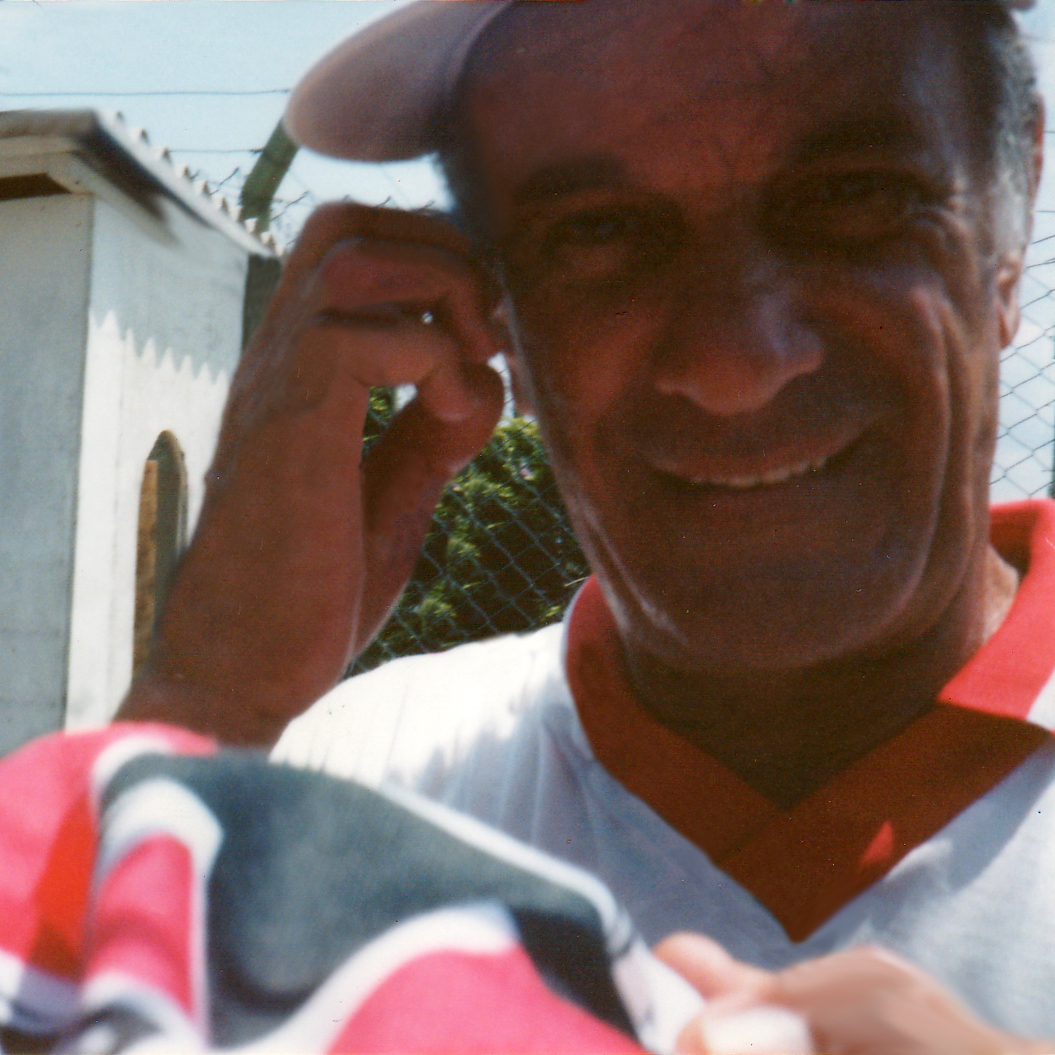
Telê Santana is one of four managers to win two record Recopa Sudamericana medals, and the first to earn them consecutively.

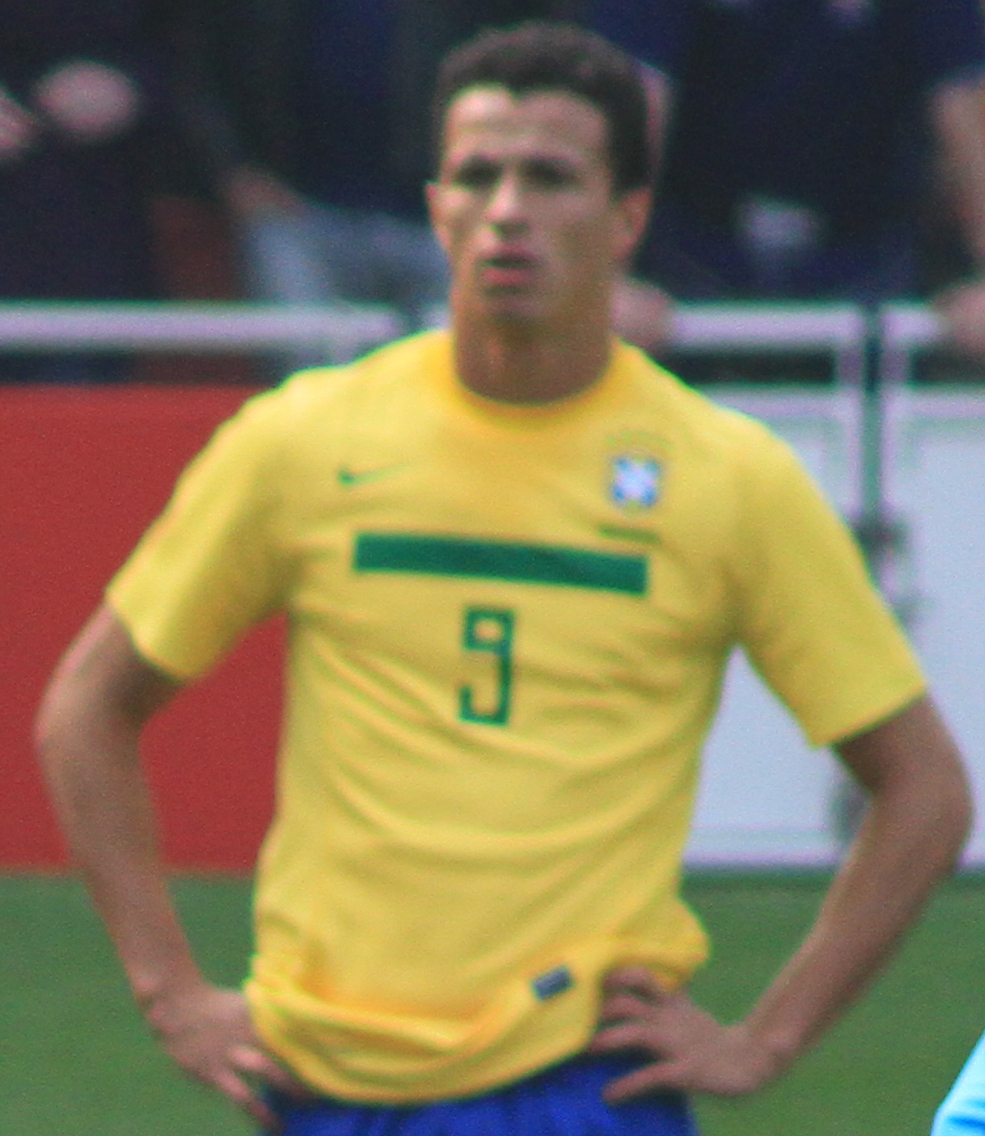
Leandro Damião, as well as Rodrigo Palacio, is joint record holder of most goals scored in a season with three goals.

Argentines Leonardo Ponzio, Sebastián Battaglia, Neri Cardozo, Rodrigo Palacio, and Jesús Dátolo, Uruguayan Camilo Mayada and Paraguayan Claudio Morel Rodríguez are the only players to have won three Recopa Sudamericana winners' medals. The overall top goalscorer in Recopa Sudamericana history is Rodrigo Palacio, scorer of five goals. Leandro Damião is second with 3 goals. Rodrigo Palacio and Leandro Damião hold the record for the most goals scored in a single Recopa Sudamericana. Each of their three goals was scored in the 2006 and 2010 finals, respectively. Claudio Morel Rodríguez is the player with most appearances in the competition, 5 editions (winning three finals), all of them in Boca Juniors with the exception of 2003 (played for San Lorenzo). Paraguayan Julio César Cáceres, Argentine Jesús Dátolo and Brazilian André are the only players that won the Recopa Sudamericana with two teams. Cáceres won in 2003 with Olimpia and 2008 with Boca Juniors, Dátolo won in 2006 and 2008 with Boca and in 2014 with Atlético Mineiro, and André won in 2012 with Santos and 2014 with Atlético Mineiro.

Argentinian Marcelo Gallardo is the only head coach to ever win three Recopa Sudamericana. Brazilians Telê Santana and Levir Culpi, Uruguayan Luis Cubilla, and Argentinian Alfio Basile are the only head coaches to ever win two Recopa Sudamericana. All Recopa Sudamericana winning head coaches were natives of the country they coached to victory except for Cubilla, Mirko Jozić, Jorge Fossati, Edgardo Bauza, Jorge Jesus and Abel Ferreira.

== Performance by club ==
Performance in the Recopa Sudamericana by club
Club	Titles	Runners-up	Seasons won	Seasons runner-up
(Argentina) Boca Juniors	4	1	1990, 2005, 2006, 2008	2004
(Argentina) River Plate	3	2	2015, 2016, 2019	1997, 1998
(Brazil) São Paulo	2	2	1993, 1994	2006, 2013
(Brazil) Internacional	2	1	2007, 2011	2009
(Ecuador) LDU Quito	2	1	2009, 2010	2024
(Paraguay) Olimpia	2	0	1991, 2003	—
(Brazil) Grêmio	2	0	1996, 2018	—
(Argentina) Independiente	1	3	1995	1996, 2011, 2018
(Brazil) Cruzeiro	1	2	1998	1992, 1993
(Brazil) Flamengo	1	2	2020	2023, 2026
(Argentina) Vélez Sarsfield	1	1	1997	1995
(Colombia) Atlético Nacional	1	1	2017	1990
(Brazil) Palmeiras	1	1	2022	2021
(Ecuador) Independiente del Valle	1	1	2023	2020
(Argentina) Racing	1	1	2025	1989
(Argentina) Lanús	1	1	2026	2014
(Uruguay) Nacional	1	0	1989	—
(Chile) Colo-Colo	1	0	1992	—
(Peru) Cienciano	1	0	2004	—
(Brazil) Santos	1	0	2012	—
(Brazil) Corinthians	1	0	2013	—
(Brazil) Atlético Mineiro	1	0	2014	—
(Argentina) Defensa y Justicia	1	0	2021	—
(Brazil) Fluminense	1	0	2024	—
(Argentina) San Lorenzo	0	2	—	2003, 2015
(Brazil) Athletico Paranaense	0	2	—	2019, 2022
(Brazil) Botafogo	0	2	—	1994, 2025
(Colombia) Once Caldas	0	1	—	2005
(Mexico) Pachuca	0	1	—	2007
(Argentina) Arsenal	0	1	—	2008
(Argentina) Estudiantes	0	1	—	2010
Universidad de Chile	0	1	—	2012
(Colombia) Santa Fe	0	1	—	2016
(Brazil) Chapecoense	0	1	—	2017

== See also ==
- List of Recopa Sudamericana winning managers
- Super cup
