= 1994 São Paulo FC season =

São Paulo
1994 season
- Manager: Telê Santana; Muricy Ramalho (at Copa do Brasil and Copa Conmebol)
- Campeonato Brasileiro: Quarter-finals
- Campeonato Paulista: Runner-up in (1995 Copa do Brasil)
- Recopa Sudamericana: Champions (2nd title)
- Copa Libertadores: Runner-up
- Supercopa Sudamericana: Semi-finals
- Copa CONMEBOL: Champions (1st title) (in 1996 Copa Master da CONMEBOL and 1996 Copa de Ouro)
- Top goalscorer: League: Aílton (11); All: Palhinha (20)
Home colours	Away colours

The 1994 season was São Paulo's 65th season since club's existence.

== Statistics ==
=== Scorers ===
Position	Nation	Playing position	Name	Campeonato Paulista	Recopa Sudamericana	Copa Libertadores	Copa Bandeirantes	Campeonato Brasileiro	Supercopa Sudamericana	Copa CONMEBOL	Others	Total
1	(Brazil)	FW	Palhinha	13	0	2	0	2	2	0	1	20
2	(Brazil)	FW	Caio	1	0	0	0	8	2	4	0	15
=	(Brazil)	FW	Euller	7	1	3	0	1	2	0	1	15
3	(Brazil)	FW	Aílton	0	0	0	0	11	2	0	0	13
=	(Brazil)	MF	Juninho	6	0	1	0	1	0	5	0	13
4	(Brazil)	FW	Guilherme	8	1	0	1	0	0	0	1	11
=	(Brazil)	MF	Leonardo	9	1	0	0	0	0	0	1	11
5	(Brazil)	FW	Müller	5	0	2	0	2	1	0	0	10
6	(Brazil)	DF	Júnior Baiano	2	0	0	0	6	0	0	1	9
7	(Brazil)	MF	André Luiz	3	0	1	0	1	0	0	1	6
=	(Brazil)	FW	Catê	0	0	0	0	2	0	4	0	6
8	(Brazil)	DF	Cafu	1	0	0	0	3	0	0	1	5
9	(Brazil)	FW	Jamelli	3	0	0	1	0	0	0	0	4
10	(Brazil)	MF	Axel	1	0	0	0	2	0	0	0	3
=	(Brazil)	DF	Gilmar	3	0	0	0	0	0	0	0	3
=	(Brazil)	MF	Valdeir	3	0	0	0	0	0	0	0	3
11	(Brazil)	FW	Toninho	0	0	0	0	1	0	1	0	2
12	(Brazil)	MF	Alemão	0	0	0	0	1	0	0	0	1
=	(Brazil)	FW	Cláudio Moura	0	0	0	1	0	0	0	0	1
=	(Brazil)	MF	Danilo	0	0	0	1	0	0	0	0	1
=	(Brazil)	MF	Denílson	0	0	0	0	0	0	1	0	1
=	(Brazil)	MF	Doriva	1	0	0	0	0	0	0	0	1
=	(Brazil)	MF	Douglas	0	0	0	1	0	0	0	0	1
=	(Chile)	MF	José Luis Sierra	0	0	0	0	1	0	0	0	1
=	(Brazil)	MF	Pereira	0	0	0	1	0	0	0	0	1
=	(Brazil)	DF	Thiago	0	0	0	1	0	0	0	0	1
=	(Brazil)	DF	Válber	0	0	1	0	0	0	0	0	1
			Total	66	3	10	7	42	9	15	7	159

=== Managers performance ===
Name	Nationality	From	To	P	W	D	L	GF	GA	%
Muricy Ramalho (assistant)	Brazil	23 January	21 December	28	12	9	7	47	32	59%
Telê Santana	Brazil	18 February	3 December	64	30	17	17	112	87	60%

=== Overall ===
Games played	92 (30 Campeonato Paulista, 1 Recopa Sudamericana, 8 Copa Libertadores, 6 Copa Bandeirantes, 27 Campeonato Brasileiro, 6 Supercopa Libertadores, 8 Copa CONMEBOL, 6 Friendly match)
Games won	42 (16 Campeonato Paulista, 1 Recopa Sudamericana, 4 Copa Libertadores, 1 Copa Bandeirantes, 12 Campeonato Brasileiro, 3 Supercopa Libertadores, 3 Copa CONMEBOL, 2 Friendly match)
Games drawn	26 (9 Campeonato Paulista, 0 Recopa Sudamericana, 2 Copa Libertadores, 1 Copa Bandeirantes, 8 Campeonato Brasileiro, 1 Supercopa Libertadores, 3 Copa CONMEBOL, 2 Friendly match)
Games lost	24 (5 Campeonato Paulista, 0 Recopa Sudamericana, 2 Copa Libertadores, 4 Copa Bandeirantes, 7 Campeonato Brasileiro, 2 Supercopa Libertadores, 2 Copa CONMEBOL, 2 Friendly match)
Goals scored	159
Goals conceded	119
Goal difference	+40
Best result	6 -1 (H) v Peñarol - Copa Conmebol - 1994.12.14; 4–0 (H) v Ferroviária – Campeonato Paulista – 1994.02.16; 4–0 (A) v América – Campeonato Paulista – 1994.04.24; 4–0 (H) v Araçatuba – Copa Bandeirantes – 1994.07.29; 4–0 (H) v Paysandu – Campeonato Brasileiro – 1994.11.06
Worst result	0–4 (A) v Botafogo – Campeonato Brasileiro – 1994.08.20
Most appearances	
Top scorer	Palhinha (20)

Source: São Paulo FC

== Friendlies ==
March 15 International	Colombia	1–0	(Brazil) São Paulo	Bogotá
	Aristizábal 12'			Stadium: Estadio Nemesio Camacho (El Campín)

April 5 International	South China (Hong Kong)	4–2	(Brazil) São Paulo	Hong Kong
	Tempest 45', 56', 79'; Li Kim 81'	Report	Palhinha 38'; Cafu 76'

May 29 National	XV de Jaú	0–0	São Paulo	Jaú
				Stadium: Estádio Zezinho Magalhães

June 19 National	Guarani	1–2	São Paulo	Campinas
	Júlio César 22'		Júnior Baiano; André Luiz	Stadium: Estádio Brinco de Ouro; Attendance: 465; Referee: Dagoberto Teixeira

=== Trofeo Club Atlético San Lorenzo de Almagro ===
February 20 International	San Lorenzo (Argentina)	2–3	(Brazil) São Paulo	Buenos Aires
	Netto; Monserrat		Euller 10'; Guilherme; Leonardo 77'	Stadium: Estadio Nuevo Gasometro

=== Taça Solidariedade ===
Friendly match held for the collection of warm clothes.

June 11 International	Corinthians (Brazil)	0–0 (4–1 p)	(Brazil) São Paulo	São Paulo
				Stadium: Estádio do Pacaembu

== Official competitions ==
=== Campeonato Paulista ===
==== League table ====
Pos	Team	Pld	W	D	L	GF	GA	GD	Pts	Qualification or relegation
1	Palmeiras	30	20	7	3	63	24	+39	47	Champions
2	São Paulo	30	16	9	5	66	38	+28	41	
3	Corinthians	30	16	9	5	59	34	+25	41	
4	Santos	30	11	12	7	37	34	+3	34	
5	América	30	12	6	12	32	32	0	30	

Updated to match(es) played on 15 May 1994. Source: RSSSF.com
Rules for classification: 1) points; 2) wins; 3) goal difference; 4) number of goals scored.

===== Matches =====
January 23 1	Santo André	1–4	São Paulo	Santo André
	Raudinei 37'		Valdeir 12'; Leonardo 26', 84'; Palhinha 79'	Stadium: Bruno José Daniel; Attendance: 17,500; Referee: José Mocelin

January 26 2	São Paulo	3–0	Ituano	São Paulo
	Juninho 10'; Valdeir 45'; Palhinha 85'			Stadium: Morumbi; Attendance: 2,313; Referee: Roberto Perassi

January 30 3	São Paulo	2–0	Santos	São Paulo
	Juninho 38'; Valdeir 83'			Stadium: Morumbi; Attendance: 14,693; Referee: Oscar Roberto Godói

February 3 4	União São João	3–2	São Paulo	Araras
	Israel 52', 59'; Pedrinho 72'		Juninho 55', 90'	Stadium: Hermínio Ometto; Attendance: 17,000; Referee: Márcio Rezende

February 6 5	São Paulo	1–1	Portuguesa	São Paulo
	André Luiz 16'		Cuca 45'	Stadium: Canindé; Attendance: 14,366; Referee: Joaquim Caetano

February 9 6	São Paulo	3–1	Guarani	São Paulo
	Axel 25'; Guilherme 29', 80'		Clóvis 39'	Stadium: Morumbi; Attendance: 4,312; Referee: João Paulo Araújo

February 12 7	Rio Branco	0–1	São Paulo	Americana
			André Luiz 19'	Stadium: Décio Vitta; Attendance: 7,558; Referee: Renato Marsiglia

February 16 8	São Paulo	4–0	Ferroviária	São Paulo
	Euller 4'; Guilherme 33', 42', 80'			Stadium: Morumbi; Attendance: 4,910; Referee: José Mocelin

February 18 9	São Paulo	0–0	América	São Paulo
				Stadium: Morumbi; Attendance: 8,747; Referee: Nélson Sônego

February 24 10	Ponte Preta	1–1	São Paulo	Campinas
	Hélio 90'		Guilherme 38'	Stadium: Moisés Lucarelli; Attendance: 6,509; Referee: Roberto Perassi

February 27 11	São Paulo	2–1	Palmeiras	São Paulo
	André Luiz 13'; Leonardo 55'		Evair 18'	Stadium: Morumbi; Attendance: 54,235; Referee: Cláudio Cerdeira

March 2 12	São Paulo	0–1	Bragantino	São Paulo
			Silvio 43'	Stadium: Morumbi; Attendance: 3,165; Referee: Renato Marsiglia

March 6 13	São Paulo	2–2	Corinthians	São Paulo
	Palhinha 17'; Leonardo 41'		Gralak 65'; Tupãzinho 78'	Stadium: Morumbi; Attendance: 53,615; Referee: Oscar Roberto Godói

March 9 14	Novorizontino	3–0	São Paulo	Novo Horizonte
	Romildo 30'; Valter 35'; Guilherme 41'			Stadium: Jorge Ismael de Biasi; Attendance: 6,625; Referee: João Paulo Araújo

March 12 15	São Paulo	5–2	Mogi Mirim	São Paulo
	Palhinha 17', 59'; Juninho 22'; Guilherme 37'; Leonardo 41'		Marco Antônio 16'; Lao 90'	Stadium: Morumbi; Attendance: 4,743; Referee: Nélson Sônego

March 19 16	Ituano	0–1	São Paulo	Itu
			Müller 87'	Stadium: Novelli Júnior; Attendance: 9,402; Referee: Oscar Roberto Godói

March 24 17	São Paulo	2–0	Ponte Preta	São Paulo
	Guilherme 20'; Euller 33'			Stadium: Morumbi; Attendance: 3,138; Referee: Silas Santana

March 26 18	Ferroviária	1–4	São Paulo	Araraquara
	Otávio Augusto 5'		Cafu 30'; Palhinha 36'; Euller 55'; Caio 89'	Stadium: Fonte Luminosa; Attendance: 10,995; Referee: Márcio Rezende

April 10 19	Santos	0–0	São Paulo	São Paulo
				Stadium: Morumbi; Attendance: 33,344; Referee: João Paulo Araújo

April 12 20	São Paulo	3–3	União São João	São Paulo
	Leonardo 45'; Júnior Baiano 57'; Juninho 82'		Edinho 4'; Vagner 49'; Cleomar 59'	Stadium: Morumbi; Attendance: 3,609; Referee: Renato Marsiglia

April 14 21	São Paulo	3–2	Rio Branco	São Paulo
	Palhinha 25'; Leonardo 55', 88'		Marcelo 58'; Souza 63'	Stadium: Estádio do Morumbi; Attendance: 1,530; Referee: Silas Santana

April 17 22	São Paulo	4–2	Portuguesa	São Paulo
	Júnior Baiano 21'; Leonardo 26'; Jamelli 38', 77'		Caio 81'; Tico 89'	Stadium: Morumbi; Attendance: 17,609; Referee: Cláudio Cerdeira

April 24 23	América	0–4	São Paulo	São José do Rio Preto
			Müller 9'; Euller 24', 65', 77'	Stadium: Mário Alves de Mendonça; Attendance: 14,660; Referee: Cláudio Cerdeira

May 1 24	São Paulo	2–3	Palmeiras	São Paulo
	Euller 24'; Müller 34'		Edílson 29'; Maurílio 74'; Evair 82'	Stadium: Morumbi; Attendance: 58,103; Referee: Juan Escobar

May 3 25	São Paulo	5–3	Santo André	São Paulo
	Doriva 20'; Palhinha 43', 59'; Müller 58'; Gilmar 77'		Jorginho 3', 13'; Claudinho 6'	Stadium: Estádio do Morumbi; Attendance: 1,755; Referee: Roberto Perassi

May 6 26	Bragantino	1–0	São Paulo	Bragança Paulista
	Sílvio 36'			Stadium: Marcelo Stéfani; Attendance: 4,984; Referee: José Mocelin

May 8 27	Corinthians	1–1	São Paulo	São Paulo
	Marcelinho Carioca 43'		Palhinha 64'	Stadium: Morumbi; Attendance: 18,991; Referee: Cláudio Cerdeira

May 10 28	Guarani	1–2	São Paulo	Campinas
	Marcelo 27'		Palhinha 25'; Gilmar 85'	Stadium: Estádio Brinco de Ouro; Attendance: 6,482; Referee: Flávio Carvalho

May 12 29	São Paulo	4–4	Novorizontino	São Paulo
	Palhinha 34', 52'; Müller 48'; Gilmar 76'		Guilherme 56', 74'; Alessandro 57'; Genílson 80'	Stadium: Morumbi; Referee: Silas Santana

May 15 30	Mogi Mirim	1–1	São Paulo	Mogi Mirim
	Lao 31'		Jamelli 43'	Stadium: Wilson Fernandes de Barros; Attendance: 10,898; Referee: Márcio Rezende

==== Record ====
Final Position	Points	Matches	Wins	Draws	Losses	Goals For	Goals Away	Win%
2nd	41	30	16	9	5	66	38	68%

=== Recopa Sudamericana ===
April 3 Final	São Paulo (Brazil)	3–1	(Brazil) Botafogo	Kobe
	Leonardo 12'; Guilherme 73'; Euller 89'		Roberto Cavalo 69'	Stadium: Kobe Universiade Memorial Stadium; Attendance: 31,000; Referee: Juan Francisco Escobar

==== Record ====
Final Position	Points	Matches	Wins	Draws	Losses	Goals For	Goals Away	Win%
1st	2	1	1	0	0	3	1	100%

=== Copa Libertadores ===
==== Eightfinals ====
April 27 Round of 16	Palmeiras (Brazil)	0–0	(Brazil) São Paulo	São Paulo
				Stadium: Estádio do Pacaembu; Attendance: 17,296; Referee: João Paulo Araújo

July 24 Round of 16	São Paulo (Brazil)	2–1 (2–1 agg.)	(Brazil) Palmeiras	São Paulo
	Euller 17', 58'		Evair 90'	Stadium: Estádio do Morumbi; Attendance: 28,647; Referee: Antônio Pereira

==== Quarterfinals ====
July 29	Unión Española (Chile)	1–1	(Brazil) São Paulo	Santiago
	Sánchez 30'		Juninho 49'	Stadium: Estadio Santa Laura; Referee: Jorge Nieves

August 3	São Paulo (Brazil)	4–3 (5–4 agg.)	(Chile) Unión Española	São Paulo
	Palhinha 21'; Válber 26'; André Luiz 58'; Euller 78'		Sánchez 51', 62'; Sierra 82'	Stadium: Estádio do Morumbi

==== Semifinals ====
August 10	São Paulo (Brazil)	2–1	(Paraguay) Olimpia	São Paulo
	Palhinha 38'; Müller 65'		Cardozo 12'	Stadium: Estádio do Morumbi; Attendance: 47,474; Referee: Jorge Nieves

August 17	Olimpia (Paraguay)	1–0 (2–2 agg.) (3–4 p)	(Brazil) São Paulo	Asunción
	Ferreira 82'			Stadium: Estadio Defensores del Chaco; Referee: Alberto Tejada

==== Finals ====
August 24	Vélez Sarsfield (Argentina)	1–0	(Brazil) São Paulo	Buenos Aires
	Asad 34'			Stadium: Estadio José Amalfitani; Referee: José Torres Cadena

August 31	São Paulo (Brazil)	1–0 (1–1 agg.) (3–5 p)	(Argentina) Vélez Sarsfield	São Paulo
	Müller 33'			Stadium: Estádio do Morumbi; Attendance: 92,560; Referee: Ernesto Filippi
	Penalties
	Palhinha (penalty missed); André Luiz (penalty scored); Müller (penalty scored); Euller (penalty scored)		Trotta (penalty scored); Chilavert (penalty scored); Zandoná (penalty scored); Almandoz (penalty scored); Pompei (penalty scored)

==== Record ====
Final Position	Points	Matches	Wins	Draws	Losses	Goals For	Goals Away	Win%
2nd	10	8	4	2	2	10	8	62%

=== Copa Bandeirantes ===
July 18 Group stage 1	Novorizontino	1–0	São Paulo	Novo Horizonte
	Carlos Zara 19'			Stadium: Jorge Ismael de Biasi

July 21 Group stage 2	Corinthians	4–1	São Paulo	São Paulo
	Marques 16', 59'; Marcelinho Carioca 57'; Souza 74'		Guilherme 90'	Stadium: Morumbi; Attendance: 2,187; Referee: Dagoberto Teixeira

July 29 Group stage 3	São Paulo	4–0	Araçatuba	São Paulo
	Danilo 21'; Douglas 32'; Pereira 39'; Cláudio Moura 41'			Stadium: Estádio do Morumbi

July 31 Group stage 4	São Paulo	0–2	Corinthians	São Paulo
			Marcelinho Paulista 61'; Rivaldo 63'	Stadium: Morumbi; Attendance: 4,928; Referee: Oscar Roberto Godói

August 5 Group stage 5	São Paulo	1–1	Novorizontino	São Paulo
	Jamelli 66'		Carlos Zara 26'	Stadium: Morumbi

August 7 Group stage 6	Araçatuba	4–1	São Paulo	Araçatuba
	Tiãozinho; Nem (o.g.); Nando 66', 74'		Thiago	Stadium: Adhemar de Barros

==== Record ====
Final Position	Points	Matches	Wins	Draws	Losses	Goals For	Goals Away	Win%
6th	3	6	1	1	4	7	12	25%

=== Campeonato Brasileiro ===
==== First round ====
Pos.	Team	Pt	G	V	N	P	GF	GS	DR
1	Botafogo	12	10	5	2	3	16	12	+4
2	Paysandu	12	10	5	2	3	14	13	+1
3	São Paulo FC	11	10	3	5	2	11	10	+1
4	Portuguesa	10	10	2	6	2	4	4	0
5	Atletico Mineiro	8	10	2	4	4	8	10	-2
6	Vitoria	7	10	1	5	4	9	13	-4

===== Matches =====
August 14 1	Paysandu	0–0	São Paulo	Belém
				Stadium: Mangueirão; Attendance: 11,458; Referee: Francisco Dacildo Mourão Albuquerque

August 18 2	São Paulo	1–0	Atlético Mineiro	São Paulo
	Juninho 27'			Stadium: Morumbi; Attendance: 758; Referee: Carlos Elias Barroso Pimentel

August 20 3	Botafogo	4–0	São Paulo	Niterói
	Rogério 32'; Túlio 71', 76', 83'			Stadium: Caio Martins; Attendance: 2,383; Referee: Antônio Pereira da Silva

August 28 4	São Paulo	2–0	Portuguesa	São Paulo
	Aílton 52'; Caio 90'			Stadium: Morumbi; Attendance: 3,912; Referee: Valdomiro Mathias Silva Filho

September 1 5	São Paulo	2–2	Vitória	São Paulo
	Caio 14', 44'		Roberto Cavalo 22'; Ricky 40'	Stadium: Estádio do Morumbi; Attendance: 353; Referee: Antônio Pereira da Silva

September 4 6	Portuguesa	0–0	São Paulo	São Paulo
				Stadium: Canindé; Attendance: 9,799; Referee: Dalmo Bozzano

September 7 7	Vitória	1–1	São Paulo	Salvador
	Giuliano 11'		Júnior Baiano 15'	Stadium: Fonte Nova; Attendance: 16,959; Referee: Carlos Elias Barroso Pimentel

September 10 8	São Paulo	4–1	Botafogo	São Paulo
	Euller 27'; Caio 35'; Júnior Baiano 50'; Aílton 88'		Nelson 51'	Stadium: Morumbi; Attendance: 7,281; Referee: José Mocellin

September 17 9	Atlético Mineiro	0–0	São Paulo	Belo Horizonte
				Stadium: Mineirão; Attendance: 28,227; Referee: Antônio Pereira da Silva

September 24 10	São Paulo	1–2	Paysandu	São Paulo
	Caio 39'		Mirandinha 30', 48'	Stadium: Morumbi; Attendance: 17,893; Referee: José Mocellin

==== Second round ====
===== First phase =====
Pos.	Team	Pt	G	V	N	P	GF	GS	DR
1	Palmeiras	11	7	4	2	1	8	5	+3
2	Sport Recife	10	7	4	2	1	15	8	+7
3	São Paulo FC	9	7	3	3	1	14	12	+2
4	Esporte Clube Bahia	8	7	2	4	1	9	8	+1
5	Santos	6	7	2	2	3	10	11	-1
6	Botafogo	6	7	2	1	4	7	12	-5
7	Flamengo	4	7	1	2	4	3	7	-4
8	Parana	4	7	0	4	3	5	8	-3

===== Matches =====
October 8 1	Santos	2–3	São Paulo	Santos
	Cafu 6' (o.g.); Moysés 79'		Júnior Baiano 44'; André Luiz 45'; Aílton 50'	Stadium: Vila Belmiro; Attendance: 20,119; Referee: Oscar Roberto de Godói

October 14 2	São Paulo	1–0	Botafogo	São Paulo
	Júnior Baiano 90'			Stadium: Morumbi; Attendance: 4,980; Referee: Dalmo Bozzano

October 16 3	Paraná	2–2	São Paulo	Curitiba
	Carlos Alberto Dias 59'; Nei Santos 80'		Aílton 31'; Müller 53'	Stadium: Estádio Couto Pereira; Attendance: 35,336; Referee: Carlos Eugênio Simon

October 23 4	São Paulo	1–1	Bahia	São Paulo
	Júnior Baiano 48'		Zé Roberto 85'	Stadium: Morumbi; Attendance: 8,897; Referee: José Mocellin

October 28 5	São Paulo	3–0	Flamengo	São Paulo
	Júnior Baiano 15'; Toninho 36'; Catê 44'			Stadium: Morumbi; Attendance: 3,080; Referee: Wilson de Souza Mendonça

October 30 6	São Paulo	2–2	Palmeiras	São Paulo
	Müller 60'; Cafu 70'		Edmundo 38', 82'	Stadium: Morumbi; Attendance: 25,120; Referee: Cláudio Vinícius Cerdeira

November 1 7	Sport	5–2	São Paulo	Recife
	Dedé 8'; Leonardo 29'; Fábio 45', 56'; Juninho 73'		Axel 44'; Caio 83'	Stadium: Ilha do Retiro; Attendance: 30,249; Referee: Francisco Dacildo Mourão Albuquerque

===== Second phase =====
Pos.	Team	Pt	G	V	N	P	GF	GS	DR
1	Botafogo	13	8	5	3	0	13	5	+8
2	Santos FC	11	8	5	1	2	10	3	+7
3	São Paulo FC	10	8	5	0	3	14	9	+5
4	Esporte Clube Bahia	10	8	3	4	1	10	6	+4
5	Parana	8	8	3	2	3	9	9	0
6	Flamengo	7	8	2	3	3	5	9	-4
7	Palmeiras	6	8	2	2	4	11	12	-1
8	Sport Recife	4	8	1	2	5	5	10	-5

===== Matches =====
November 3 1	Vasco da Gama	2–0	São Paulo	Rio de Janeiro
	Gian 27'; Valdir Bigode 41'			Stadium: Maracanã; Attendance: 5,559; Referee: Paulo Jackson Motta Silveira

November 6 2	São Paulo	4–0	Paysandu	São Paulo
	Catê 14'; Aílton 39', 79'; Caio 63'			Stadium: Morumbi; Attendance: 4,345; Referee: Luciano Augusto Teotônio Almeida

November 9 3	São Paulo	0–2	Portuguesa	São Paulo
			Tiba 4'; Paulinho 84'	Stadium: Morumbi; Attendance: 6,271; Referee: João Paulo Araújo

November 12 4	Internacional	0–1	São Paulo	Porto Alegre
			Aílton 85'	Stadium: Beira-Rio; Attendance: 8,651; Referee: Antônio Pereira da Silva

November 16 5	São Paulo	3–1	Grêmio	São Paulo
	Axel 30'; Aílton 74', 81'		Leonidas 60'	Stadium: Morumbi; Attendance: 4,693; Referee: Marco Antônio da Cunha

November 19 6	Guarani	1–0	São Paulo	Campinas
	Amoroso 62'			Stadium: Brinco de Ouro; Attendance: 16,905; Referee: José Mocellin

November 23 7	Corinthians	1–2	São Paulo	São Paulo
	Pinga 65'		Cafu 32'; Sierra 68'	Stadium: Pacaembu; Attendance: 13,082; Referee: Márcio Rezende de Freitas

November 27 8	São Paulo	4–2	Fluminense	São Paulo
	Aílton 24'; Cafu 55'; Alemão 60'; Palhinha 76'		Ézio 41'; Leonardo 87'	Stadium: Morumbi; Attendance: 16,390; Referee: Luciano Augusto Teotônio Almeida

==== Second round table ====
Pos.	Squadra	Pt	G	V	N	P	GF	GS	DR
1	Guarani FC	24	15	9	5	1	22	11	+11
2	São Paulo FC	19	15	8	3	4	28	21	+7
3	Botafogo	19	15	7	4	4	20	17	+3
4	Esporte Clube Bahia	18	15	5	8	2	19	14	+5
5	Santos FC	17	15	7	3	5	20	14	+6
6	Palmeiras	17	15	6	4	5	19	17	+2
7	Portuguesa FC	16	15	7	2	6	22	26	+6
8	Corinthians	16	15	6	3	6	19	22	-3

==== Quarterfinals ====
November 29	São Paulo	1–0	Guarani	São Paulo
	Palhinha 81'			Stadium: Morumbi; Attendance: 21,911; Referee: Cláudio Vinícius Cerdeira

December 3	Guarani	4–2	São Paulo	Campinas
	Sandoval 32'; Julio César 65'; Luizão 71'; Valdeir 90'		Aílton 45'; Caio 87'	Stadium: Estádio Brinco de Ouro; Attendance: 24,993; Referee: Márcio Rezende de Freitas

==== Record ====
Final Position	Points	Matches	Wins	Draws	Losses	Goals For	Goals Away	Win%
6th	32	27	12	8	7	42	35	59%

=== Supercopa Sudamericana ===
==== Eightfinals ====
September 21 Round of 16	Atlético Nacional (Colombia)	0–2	(Brazil) São Paulo	Medellín
			Caio 13'; Euller 18'	Stadium: Estadio Atanasio Girardot; Referee: Alfredo Rodas

September 28 Round of 16	São Paulo (Brazil)	1–1 (3–1 agg.)	(Colombia) Atlético Nacional	São Paulo
	Palhinha 79'		Serna 1'	Stadium: Estádio do Morumbi; Attendance: 5,500; Referee: Francisco Lamolina

==== Quarterfinals ====
October 5 Quarter-final	Colo-Colo (Chile)	2–1	(Brazil) São Paulo	Santiago
	Etcheverry 62'; Pizarro 87'		Aílton 70'	Stadium: Estadio Monumental; Attendance: 30,000; Referee: Anibal Hay

October 12 Quarter-final	São Paulo (Brazil)	4–1 (5–3 agg.)	(Chile) Colo-Colo	São Paulo
	Euller 60'; Aílton 61'; Müller 83'; Palhinha 90'		Fracchia 86'	Stadium: Estádio do Morumbi; Attendance: 50,000; Referee: Armando Hoyos

==== Semifinals ====
October 19 Semi-final	Boca Juniors (Argentina)	2–0	(Brazil) São Paulo	Buenos Aires
	Carranza 30'; Márcico 38'			Stadium: Estadio La Bombonera; Attendance: 50,000; Referee: Salvador Imperatore

October 26 Semi-final	São Paulo (Brazil)	1–0 (1–2 agg.)	(Argentina) Boca Juniors	São Paulo
	Caio 73'			Stadium: Estádio do Morumbi; Attendance: 7,000; Referee: Júlio Matto

==== Record ====
Final Position	Points	Matches	Wins	Draws	Losses	Goals For	Goals Away	Win%
3rd	7	6	3	1	2	9	6	58%

=== Copa CONMEBOL ===
==== Eightfinals ====
November 2 First round	Grêmio (Brazil)	0–0	(Brazil) São Paulo	Porto Alegre
				Stadium: Estádio Olímpico Monumental

November 10 First round	São Paulo (Brazil)	0–0 (0–0 agg.) (6–5 p)	(Brazil) Grêmio	São Paulo
				Stadium: Estádio do Morumbi
	Penalties
	Vaguinho (penalty scored); Ronaldo Luís (penalty scored); Caio (penalty scored); Pereira (penalty missed); Bordon (penalty scored); Juninho Paulista (penalty scored); Rogério Ceni (penalty scored)		(penalty missed) Agnaldo; (penalty scored) Fabinho; (penalty scored) Arílson; (penalty scored) Pingo; (penalty scored) Emerson; (penalty scored) Ciro; (penalty missed) Luís Carlos

==== Quarterfinals ====
November 16 Quarterfinals	São Paulo (Brazil)	3–1	(Peru) Sporting Cristal	São Paulo
	Juninho Paulista 64'; Caio 69'; Denílson 74'		Palacios 37'	Stadium: Estádio do Morumbi; Attendance: 4.693; Referee: Roberto Ruscio (ARG)

November 24 Quarterfinals	Sporting Cristal (Peru)	0–0 (1–3 agg.)	(Brazil) São Paulo	Lima
				Stadium: Estadio José Dias; Attendance: 25.000

==== Semifinals ====
December 2 Semifinals	Corinthians (Brazil)	3–4	(Brazil) São Paulo	São Paulo
	Casagrande 6'; Branco 51'; Marques 84'		Juninho Paulista 12', 33', 58'; Catê 35'	Stadium: Estádio do Pacaembu; Attendance: 16,737; Referee: Oscar Roberto Godói (BRA)

December 9 Semifinals	São Paulo (Brazil)	2–3 (6–6 agg.) (5–4 p)	(Brazil) Corinthians	São Paulo
	Caio 15'; Juninho Paulista 57'		Daniel Franco 41'; Tupãzinho 65'; Viola 79'	Stadium: Estádio do Pacaembu; Attendance: 2,961; Referee: Cláudio Vinícius Cerdeira (BRA)
	Penalties
	Ronaldo Luís (penalty scored); Bordon (penalty scored); Rogério Ceni (penalty scored); Catê (penalty scored); Caio (penalty missed); Nelson (penalty scored)		(penalty missed) Gralak; (penalty scored) Casagrande; (penalty scored) Viola; (penalty scored) Tupãzinho; (penalty scored) Daniel Franco; (penalty missed) Leandro Silva

==== Finals ====
December 14 Finals	São Paulo (Brazil)	6–1	(Uruguay) Peñarol	São Paulo
	Caio 41', 75'; Catê 57', 83', 89'; Toninho 71'		Aguilera 4'	Stadium: Estádio do Morumbi; Attendance: 4,995; Referee: Iván Guerrero (CHI)

December 21 Finals	Peñarol (Uruguay)	3–0 (4–6 agg.)	(Brazil) São Paulo	Montevideo
	Rodríguez 57', 74'; Silva 72'			Stadium: Estadio Centenario; Attendance: 30,000; Referee: Javier Castrilli (ARG)

==== Record ====
Final Position	Points	Matches	Wins	Draws	Losses	Goals For	Goals Away	Win%
1st	9	8	3	3	2	15	11	56%
