= 1995 São Paulo FC season =

São Paulo
1995 season
- Chairman: Fernando Casal de Rey
- Manager: Telê Santana; Muricy Ramalho (at Copa do Brasil)
- Campeonato Brasileiro Série A: First stage
- Campeonato Paulista: Second stage
- Copa do Brasil: Quarter-finals (in 1996 Copa do Brasil)
- Supercopa Sudamericana: Quarter-finals
- Top goalscorer: League: Almir and Caio (6); All: Bentinho (22)

The 1995 season was São Paulo's 66th season since club's existence.

== Statistics ==
=== Scorers ===
Position	Nation	Playing position	Name	Campeonato Paulista	Copa do Brasil	Campeonato Brasileiro	Supercopa Sudamericana	Others	Total
1	(Brazil)	FW	Bentinho	20	1	0	0	1	22
2	(Brazil)	FW	Caio	6	2	6	3	1	18
3	(Brazil)	FW	Aílton	2	4	2	0	1	9
4	(Brazil)	FW	Almir	0	0	6	0	0	6
=	(Brazil)	FW	Catê	2	2	0	0	2	6
=	(Brazil)	MF	Juninho	4	0	0	0	2	6
5	(Brazil)	MF	Denílson	1	0	1	1	2	5
6	(Brazil)	MF	André Luiz	1	1	2	0	0	4
=	(Brazil)	MF	Cláudio Moura	0	0	1	0	3	4
=	(Brazil)	FW	Luciano	0	0	4	0	0	4
=	(Brazil)	MF	Palhinha	3	0	0	1	0	4
7	(Brazil)	FW	Amarildo	0	0	1	2	0	3
=	(Brazil)	FW	Dodô	1	1	1	0	0	3
8	(Brazil)	MF	José Alexandre	0	0	2	0	0	2
=	(Chile)	MF	José Luis Sierra	1	0	0	0	1	2
=	(Brazil)	DF	Júnior Baiano	1	0	0	0	1	2
=	(Brazil)	MF	Pereira	2	0	0	0	0	2
=	(Brazil)	FW	Tico	0	2	0	0	0	2
9	(Brazil)	MF	Alemão	1	0	0	0	0	1
=	(Brazil)	DF	Bordon	1	0	0	0	0	1
=	(Brazil)	MF	Donizete	1	0	0	0	0	1
=	(Brazil)	DF	Murilo	1	0	0	0	0	1
=	(Brazil)	DF	Rogério Pinheiro	1	0	0	0	0	1
=	(Brazil)	MF	Toninho Cerezo	0	0	0	0	1	1
			Own goals	2	0	0	0	0	2
			Total	51	13	26	7	17	114

=== Overall ===
Games played	86 (36 Campeonato Paulista, 7 Copa do Brasil, 23 Campeonato Brasileiro, 6 Supercopa Libertadores, 14 Friendly match)
Games won	39 (17 Campeonato Paulista, 3 Copa do Brasil, 9 Campeonato Brasileiro, 4 Supercopa Libertadores, 6 Friendly match)
Games drawn	24 (10 Campeonato Paulista, 3 Copa do Brasil, 6 Campeonato Brasileiro, 0 Supercopa Libertadores, 5 Friendly match)
Games lost	23 (9 Campeonato Paulista, 1 Copa do Brasil, 8 Campeonato Brasileiro, 2 Supercopa Libertadores, 3 Friendly match)
Goals scored	116
Goals conceded	89
Goal difference	+26
Best result	4–1 (H) v Novorizontino – Campeonato Paulista – 1995.02.04; 4–1 (A) v Náutico – Copa do Brasil – 1995.03.14; 4–1 (H) v Ponte Preta – Campeonato Paulista – 1995.04.20
Worst result	1–4 (A) v Werder Bremen – Friendly match – 1995.08.07
Most appearances	
Top scorer	Bentinho (22)

Source: São Paulo FC

== Friendlies ==
February 1 National	Ituano	1–2	São Paulo	Itu
	Carlos Alberto 40'		Sierra 12'; Juninho 44'	Stadium: Estádio Novelli Júnior; Attendance: 2,068; Referee: Roberto Perassi

February 26 International	Shimizu S-Pulse (Japan)	2–2	(Brazil) São Paulo	Shimizu
	Nakashima 49'; Naito 70'		Bentinho 20'; Caio 86'	Stadium: Nihondaira Sports; Attendance: 20,000; Referee: Ota Kiyoshi

March 4 International	Nagoya Grampus (Japan)	2–1	(Brazil) São Paulo	Aichi
	Yonekuna 35'; Moriyama 54'		Júnior Baiano 3'	Stadium: Naragawa Stadium; Attendance: 11,000; Referee: Katayama

March 7 International	Júbilo Iwata (Japan)	0–1	(Brazil) São Paulo	Iwata
			Juninho 22'	Stadium: Júbilo Iwata Stadium

August 7 International	Werder Bremen (Germany)	4–1	(Brazil) São Paulo	Bremen
	Basler 17'; Cardoso 25'; Scholz 77'; Neubarth 84'		Denílson 29'	Stadium: Weserstadion; Attendance: 12,800; Referee: Kemmling

June 19 139º Aniversário de Ribeirão Preto	Comercial / Botafogo	1–2	São Paulo	Ribeirão Preto
	Goal		Goal	Stadium: Estádio Palma Travassos

August 15 National	Corinthians	2–2	São Paulo	Goiânia
	Elivélton 42'; Serginho 64'		Denílson 78'; Cláudio Moura 86'	Stadium: Estádio Serra Dourada; Referee: Lindonor Ribeiro dos Santos

=== Trofeo Achille e Cesare Bortolotti ===
August 19 International	Atalanta (Italy)	2–2 (8–9 p)	(Brazil) São Paulo	Bergamo
	Marco Sgrò 25'; Daniele Fortunato 72'		Cláudio Moura 10', 86'	Stadium: Stadio Atleti Azzurri d'Italia
	Penalties
	Gianluca Luppi (penalty scored); Marco Sgrò (penalty scored); Domenico Morfeo (penalty missed); Daniele Fortunato (penalty scored); Sandro Tovalieri (penalty scored); Mauro Valentini (penalty scored); Stefano Salvatori (penalty scored); Nicola Boselli (penalty scored); Marco Zanchi (penalty scored); Denis Zanardo (penalty missed)		Bordon (penalty scored); André Luiz (penalty scored); Alemão (penalty scored); Cláudio Moura (penalty missed); Gilmar (penalty scored); Catê (penalty scored); Denílson (penalty scored); Caio (penalty scored); Pavão (penalty scored); Donizete (penalty scored)

=== Torneio Rei Dadá ===
July 15 National	Uberlândia	1–2	São Paulo	Uberlândia
	Goal		Moscatto	Stadium: Estádio Parque do Sabiá

July 16 National	Ferroviária	0–0 (4–5 p)	São Paulo	Uberlândia
				Stadium: Estádio Parque do Sabiá

=== Copa dos Campeões Mundiais ===
July 5 Group stage 1	Santos	2–1	São Paulo	Uberlândia
	Giovanni 16', 35'		Toninho Cerezo 76'	Stadium: Estádio Parque do Sabiá; Referee: Marco Antônio da Cunha

July 11 Group stage 2	São Paulo	1–0	Grêmio	Uberlândia
	Aílton 90'			Stadium: Estádio Parque do Sabiá; Referee: Lincoln Bicalho

July 20 Group stage 3	São Paulo	2–1	Flamengo	Uberlândia
	Catê 23', 26'		Marquinhos 2'	Stadium: Estádio Parque do Sabiá; Referee: Antônio William Gomes

July 28 Final	São Paulo	0–0 (4–3 p)	Santos	Uberlândia
				Stadium: Estádio Parque do Sabiá; Referee: Márcio Rezende de Freitas

== Official competitions ==
=== Campeonato Paulista ===
==== Matches ====
January 29 First stage 1	Araçatuba	0–3	São Paulo	Araçatuba
			Bentinho 34'; Cláudio 61' (o.g.); Pereira 90'	Stadium: Doutor Adhemar de Barros; Attendance: 16,079; Referee: Carlos Elias Barros Pimentel

February 4 First stage 2	São Paulo	4–1	Novorizontino	Santo André
	Bentinho 5', 52'; Juninho 26', 70'		Geraldo 56'	Stadium: Bruno José Daniel; Attendance: 9,815; Referee: Dionísio Roberto Domingos

February 9 First stage 3	União São João	0–2	São Paulo	Araras
			Donizete 35'; Bentinho 44'	Stadium: Hermínio Ometto; Attendance: 15,150; Referee: Oscar Roberto de Godói

February 12 First stage 4	São Paulo	1–2	Portuguesa	São Paulo
	Caio 73'		Jorginho 5'; Tiba 20'	Stadium: Parque Antárctica; Attendance: 14,714; Referee: Cláudio Vinícius Cerdeira

February 18 First stage 5	Juventus	0–1	São Paulo	Santo André
			Rogério Pinheiro 81'	Stadium: Bruno José Daniel; Attendance: 9,035; Referee: José Mocellin

February 22 First stage 6	São Paulo	2–2	Rio Branco	São Paulo
	Palhinha 46', 57'		Marcelo Carioca 35', 42'	Stadium: Morumbi; Attendance: 3,442; Referee: Dalmo Bozzano

March 12 First stage 7	Palmeiras	2–1	São Paulo	São Paulo
	Roberto Carlos 17'; Paulo Isidoro 42'		André Luiz 90'	Stadium: Pacaembu; Attendance: 22,968; Referee: José Mocellin

March 19 First stage 8	São Paulo	1–2	Corinthians	São Paulo
	Caio 50'		Marcelinho Carioca 22'; Tupãzinho 88'	Stadium: Pacaembu; Attendance: 24,377; Referee: Oscar Roberto de Godói

March 22 First stage 9	São Paulo	2–1	Ferroviária	São Paulo
	Caio 15'; Palhinha 17'		Catatau 44'	Stadium: Morumbi; Attendance: 1,503; Referee: Dagoberto Teixeira

March 25 First stage 10	América	0–2	São Paulo	São José do Rio Preto
			Caio 21'; Denílson 58'	Stadium: Mário Alves de Mendonça; Attendance: 7,923; Referee: Márcio Rezende de Freitas

March 29 First stage 11	Ponte Preta	2–2	São Paulo	Campinas
	Arnaldo 51', 79'		Bentinho 45', 61'	Stadium: Moisés Lucarelli; Attendance: 3,732; Referee: Carlos Elias Barros Pimentel

April 1 First stage 12	Bragantino	0–2	São Paulo	Bragança Paulista
			Bentinho 23', 78'	Stadium: Marcelo Stéfani; Attendance: 5,520; Referee: Dalmo Bozzano

April 5 First stage 13	São Paulo	0–2	Guarani	São Paulo
			Djalminha 64'; Nélio 70'	Stadium: Morumbi; Attendance: 4,240; Referee: Roberto Perassi

April 9 First stage 14	Santos	1–1	São Paulo	Santos
	Marcelo Passos 77'		Bentinho 10'	Stadium: Vila Belmiro; Attendance: 20,000; Referee: José Mocellin

April 12 First stage 15	São Paulo	2–2	XV de Piracicaba	São Paulo
	Bentinho 49'; Juninho 59'		Marcão 37'; Cláudio Moura 78'	Stadium: Morumbi; Attendance: 1,476; Referee: Dionísio Roberto Domingos

April 15 First stage 16	São Paulo	2–1	Araçatuba	São Paulo
	Aílton 60'; Catê 86'		Adil 74'	Stadium: Morumbi; Attendance: 2,931; Referee: Nelson Aparecido Sônego

April 20 First stage 17	São Paulo	4–1	Ponte Preta	São Paulo
	Bentinho 33', 38'; Sierra 45'; Juninho 48'		Pedro Luiz 5'	Stadium: Morumbi; Attendance: 1,312; Referee: Marcos Fábio Spironelli

April 23 First stage 18	São Paulo	1–0	Palmeiras	São Paulo
	Bentinho 86'			Stadium: Pacaembu; Attendance: 22,655; Referee: Julio Matto

April 26 First stage 19	São Paulo	1–0	América	São Paulo
	Catê 86'			Stadium: Morumbi; Attendance: 1,723; Referee: Dalmo Bozzano

April 29 First stage 20	XV de Piracicaba	0–1	São Paulo	Piracicaba
			Bentinho 75'	Stadium: Barão da Serra Negra; Attendance: 14,361; Referee: Márcio Rezende de Freitas

May 7 First stage 21	Corinthians	2–2	São Paulo	São Paulo
	Bernardo 17'; Vítor 48'		Bordon 50'; Bentinho 61'	Stadium: Morumbi; Attendance: 19,327; Referee: Pierluigi Pairetto

May 10 First stage 22	Guarani	0–0	São Paulo	Campinas
				Stadium: Brinco de Ouro; Attendance: 6,008; Referee: José Mocellin

May 14 First stage 23	São Paulo	1–0	União São João	São Paulo
	Bentinho 81'			Stadium: Morumbi; Attendance: 3,160; Referee: Alfredo dos Santos Loebling

May 17 First stage 24	São Paulo	1–1	Bragantino	São Paulo
	Bentinho 64'		Maurinho 15'	Stadium: Morumbi; Attendance: 1,231; Referee: Cláudio Vinícius Cerdeira

May 20 First stage 25	Rio Branco	0–2	São Paulo	Americana
			Alemão 10'; Murilo 44'	Stadium: Décio Vitta; Attendance: 4,441; Referee: Márcio Rezende de Freitas

May 24 First stage 26	São Paulo	2–1	Juventus	São Paulo
	Bentinho 1'; Nildo 55' (o.g.)		Anderson 75'	Stadium: Morumbi; Attendance: 1,432; Referee: Roberto Perassi

May 27 First stage 27	Novorizontino	1–1	São Paulo	Novo Horizonte
	Alessandro 74'		Júnior Baiano 64'	Stadium: Jorge Ismael de Biasi; Attendance: 4,427; Referee: Carlos Elias Barros Pimentel

June 4 First stage 28	São Paulo	0–0	Santos	São Paulo
				Stadium: Pacaembu; Attendance: 17,820; Referee: Flávio de Carvalho

June 8 First stage 29	Ferroviária	1–0	São Paulo	Araraquara
	Otávio Augusto 30'			Stadium: Fonte Luminosa; Attendance: 9,459; Referee: Alfredo dos Santos Loebling

June 11 First stage 30	Portuguesa	2–1	São Paulo	São Paulo
	Flávio 7'; Gilmar 27'		Bentinho 10'	Stadium: Canindé; Attendance: 14,559; Referee: José Mocellin

June 17 Second stage 1	São Paulo	0–2	Guarani	São Paulo
			Nélio 28'; Marcinho 45'	Stadium: Morumbi; Attendance: 6,522; Referee: Cláudio Vinícius Cerdeira

June 24 Second stage 2	Mogi Mirim	1–2	São Paulo	Mogi Mirim
	Sandro 70'		Caio 4'; Aílton 88'	Stadium: Wilson Fernandes de Barros; Attendance: 7,920; Referee: Márcio Rezende de Freitas

July 2 Second stage 3	Palmeiras	0–0	São Paulo	Ribeirão Preto
				Stadium: Santa Cruz; Attendance: 48,500; Referee: Léo Feldman

July 8 Second stage 4	São Paulo	1–2	Mogi Mirim	São Paulo
	Bentinho 62'		Valdo 54'; Moreno 63'	Stadium: Morumbi; Attendance: 4,366; Referee: José Mocellin

July 16 Second stage 5	São Paulo	0–1	Palmeiras	Ribeirão Preto
			Rivaldo 54'	Stadium: Santa Cruz; Attendance: 26,171; Referee: Julio Matto

July 22 Second stage 6	Guarani	2–3	São Paulo	Campinas
	Djalminha 45'; Luizão 59'		Dodô 75'; Pereira 81'; Caio 86'	Stadium: Brinco de Ouro; Attendance: 646; Referee: Edílson Pereira de Carvalho

==== Record ====
Final Position	Points	Matches	Wins	Draws	Losses	Goals For	Goals Away	Win%
5th	61	36	17	10	9	51	35	56%

=== Copa do Brasil ===
February 14 Round of 64	Sergipe	1–1	São Paulo	Aracajú
	Gilsinho 42'		Catê 62'	Stadium: Batistão; Attendance: 7.891; Referee: Fernando de Andrade Santana

March 10 Round of 64	São Paulo	3–0	Sergipe	São Paulo
	Caio 52', 56'; André Luiz 78'			Stadium: Morumbi; Attendance: 1,091; Referee: Carlos Jacques Rodrigues Magno

March 14 Round of 32	Náutico	1–4	São Paulo	Recife
	Niquinha 18'		Catê 3'; Aílton 17', 43'; André Luiz 45'	Stadium: dos Aflitos; Attendance: 7,220; Referee: Sidrack Marinho dos Santos

April 7 Round of 16	São Paulo	3–0	Remo	São Paulo
	Tico 46', 64'; Aílton 59'			Stadium: Morumbi; Attendance: 843; Referee: Sidrack Marinho dos Santos

April 18 Round of 16	Remo	1–1	São Paulo	Belém
	Luiz Müller 48'		Dodô 1'	Stadium: Mangueirão; Attendance: 6,981; Referee: Marcelo Bispo Nunes Filho

May 5 Quarterfinals	São Paulo	1–1	Grêmio	São Paulo
	Bentinho 32'		Paulo Nunes 84'	Stadium: Pacaembu; Attendance: 15,934; Referee: Sidrack Marinho dos Santos

May 12 Quarterfinals	Grêmio	2–0	São Paulo	Porto Alegre
	Arílson 68'; Jardel 78'			Stadium: Olímpico; Attendance: 46,791; Referee: Márcio Rezende de Freitas

==== Record ====
Final Position	Points	Matches	Wins	Draws	Losses	Goals For	Goals Away	Win%
6th	12	7	3	3	1	13	6	57%

=== Campeonato Brasileiro ===
==== First round ====
Chave B

Pos.	Team	P	J	V	E	D	GP	GC	SG	%	
1	Fluminense	21	11	6	3	2	10	4	+6	63	Qualified to Semifinals
2	Internacional	21	11	6	3	2	15	10	+5	63	
3	Santos FC	19	11	6	1	4	19	18	+1	57	
4	Sao Paulo FC	19	11	5	4	2	9	5	+4	57	
5	Portuguesa	18	11	5	3	3	16	14	+2	54	

===== Matches =====
August 27 Round 1	São Paulo	1–1	Atlético Mineiro	São Paulo
	Amarildo 68'		Renaldo 78'	Stadium: Morumbi; Attendance: 3,201; Referee: José Carlos Marcondes

August 30 Round 2	Goiás	0–0	São Paulo	Goiânia
				Stadium: Serra Dourada; Attendance: 18,967; Referee: Luciano Augusto Teotônio Almeida

September 2 Round 3	São Paulo	1–1	Fluminense	São Paulo
	Cláudio Moura 4'		Renato Gaúcho 29'	Stadium: Morumbi; Attendance: 2,576; Referee: Márcio Rezende de Freitas

September 7 Round 4	São Paulo	2–0	União São João	São Paulo
	Caio 19', 28'			Stadium: Morumbi; Attendance: 2,489; Referee: Dionísio Roberto Domingos

September 10 Round 5	Vasco da Gama	1–0	São Paulo	Rio de Janeiro
	Valdir Bigode 59'			Stadium: São Januário; Attendance: 1,125; Referee: Francisco Dacildo Mourão Albuquerque

September 16 Round 6	Bahia	1–0	São Paulo	Salvador
	Bobô 68'			Stadium: Pitaçu; Attendance: 12,246; Referee: Valdomiro Mathias Silva Filho

September 19 Round 7	Santos	0–1	São Paulo	Santos
			Denílson 34'	Stadium: Estádio Vila Belmiro; Attendance: 6,290; Referee: Flávio de Carvalho

September 23 Round 8	São Paulo	1–0	Sport	São Paulo
	Almir 19'			Stadium: Morumbi; Attendance: 960; Referee: Jorge Fernando Rabello

September 30 Round 9	Criciúma	0–1	São Paulo	Criciúma
			Alexandre 76'	Stadium: Heriberto Hulse; Attendance: 9,349; Referee: Carlos Jacques Rodrigues Magno

October 4 Round 10	São Paulo	1–0	Portuguesa	São Paulo
	Caio 13'			Stadium: Morumbi; Attendance: 3,312; Referee: Flávio de Carvalho

October 8 Round 11	São Paulo	1–1	Internacional	São Paulo
	Almir 35'		Leandro 43'	Stadium: Morumbi; Attendance: 4,820; Referee: Márcio Rezende de Freitas

==== Second round ====
Chave B

Pos.	Team	P	J	V	E	D	GP	GC	SG	%	
1	Santos FC	27	12	8	3	1	25	13	+12	75	Qualified to Semifinals
2	Atletico Mineiro	26	12	8	2	2	23	15	+8	72	
3	Goias	19	12	6	1	5	17	14	+3	52	
4	Portuguesa	17	12	4	5	3	12	14	–2	47	
5	Sao Paulo FC	14	12	4	2	6	17	18	–1	38	

===== Matches =====
October 12 Round 12	São Paulo	0–2	Botafogo	São Paulo
			Túlio 34', 85'	Stadium: Morumbi; Attendance: 4,681; Referee: Antônio Pereira da Silva

October 14 Round 13	Guarani	4–2	São Paulo	Campinas
	Luizão 21'; Sérgio Soares 24', 77'; Fernando Diniz 48'		Caio 20'; Alexandre 40'	Stadium: Brinco de Ouro; Attendance: 3,703; Referee: Dionísio Roberto Domingos

October 21 Round 14	São Paulo	2–2	Juventude	São Paulo
	Almir 38'; Caio 83'		Andrei 41'; Jorginho 57'	Stadium: Morumbi; Attendance: 1,196; Referee: Jorge dos Santos Travassos

October 29 Round 15	Corinthians	1–0	São Paulo	Ribeirão Preto
	Clóvis 52'			Stadium: Francisco de Palma; Attendance: 9,469; Referee: Márcio Rezende de Freitas

November 5 Round 16	São Paulo	3–1	Paraná	São Paulo
	André Luiz 15'; Caio 31'; Almir 35'		Sílvio 77'	Stadium: Morumbi; Attendance: 2,302; Referee: Marco Antônio da Cunha

November 8 Round 17	Cruzeiro	1–3	São Paulo	Belo Horizonte
	Paulinho McLaren 16'		Luciano 36', 43'; Almir 60'	Stadium: Mineirão; Attendance: 5.786; Referee: Paulo Jackson Motta Silveira

November 11 Round 18	Grêmio	2–1	São Paulo	Porto Alegre
	Dinho 57'; Jardel 71'		Luciano 17'	Stadium: Olímpico; Attendance: 7,080; Referee: Jorge Rabelo

November 18 Round 19	São Paulo	2–0	Vitória	São Paulo
	Luciano 31'; André Luiz 84'			Stadium: Morumbi; Attendance: 1,471; Referee: Léo Felman

November 22 Round 20	Paysandu	1–0	São Paulo	Belém
	Flávio Costa 10'			Stadium: Mangueirão; Attendance: 2,806; Referee: Dacildo Mourão

November 26 Round 21	São Paulo	0–2	Palmeiras	Campo Grande
			Wágner 47'; Müller 89'	Stadium: Morenão; Attendance: 36,612; Referee: Getúlio Souza Lima

November 30 Round 22	São Paulo	2–0	Bragantino	Sorocaba
	Almir 31'; Aílton 84'			Stadium: Estádio Municipal Walter Ribeiro; Attendance: 10,004; Referee: Flávio de Carvalho

December 3 Round 23	Flamengo	2–2	São Paulo	Juiz de Fora
	Rodrigo 55'; Aloísio 52'		Dodô 47'; Aílton 56'	Stadium: Mário Helênio; Attendance: 4,737; Referee: Lincoln Bicalho

==== Record ====
Final Position	Points	Matches	Wins	Draws	Losses	Goals For	Goals Away	Win%
12th	33	23	9	6	8	26	23	47%

=== Supercopa Sudamericana ===
September 13 Group stage 1	São Paulo (Brazil)	1–0	(Argentina) Boca Juniors	São Paulo
	Caio 57'			Stadium: Estádio do Pacaembu; Attendance: 1,488; Referee: José Rosa

September 26 Group stage 2	Olimpia (Paraguay)	1–2	(Brazil) São Paulo	Asunción
			Caio 14'; Denílson 17'	Stadium: Estadio Defensores del Chaco

October 10 Group stage 3	Boca Juniors (Argentina)	2–3	(Brazil) São Paulo	Buenos Aires
	Márcico 69'; Pico 69'		Amarildo 57', 64'; Caio 86'	Stadium: Estadio Alberto J. Armando (La Bombonera); Referee: Eduardo Dluzniewski

October 18 Group stage 4	São Paulo (Brazil)	0–3	(Paraguay) Olimpia	São Paulo
			González 13', 48'; Báez 20'	Stadium: Estádio do Morumbi; Attendance: 433; Referee: Oscar Ruiz

October 24 Quarterfinals	Cruzeiro (Brazil)	0–1	(Brazil) São Paulo	Belo Horizonte
			Palhinha 8'	Stadium: Estádio do Mineirão; Attendance: 18,055; Referee: Wilson de Souza Mendonça

November 2 Quarterfinals	São Paulo (Brazil)	0–1 (1–4 p)	(Brazil) Cruzeiro	São Paulo
			Dinei	Stadium: Estádio do Pacaembu; Attendance: 4,680; Referee: Felix Benegas

==== Record ====
Final Position	Points	Matches	Wins	Draws	Losses	Goals For	Goals Away	Win%
6th	12	6	4	0	2	7	7	66%
