= Bruno Mendes =

Bruno Mendes may refer to:

- Bruno Mendes (footballer, born 1976), Portuguese central defender
- Bruno Mendes (footballer, born 1994), Brazilian striker

== See also ==
- Bruno Méndez (disambiguation)
