= Torneio Rei Dadá =

1995 Torneio Rei Dadá
Tournament details
- Country: Brazil (Uberlândia, Minas Gerais)
- Dates: 15–16 July
- Teams: 4

Final positions
- Champions: São Paulo
- Runners-up: Ferroviária
- Third place: Uberlândia
- Fourth place: Atlético Mineiro

Tournament statistics
- Matches played: 4
- Goals scored: 8 (2 per match)

The Torneio Rei Dadá (English: Rei Dadá Tournament), was a friendly tournament organized by municipality of Uberlândia to celebrate the reopening of the Estádio Parque do Sabiá. The name of the competition was a tribute to Dadá Maravilha, one of the greatest players of the Minas Gerais football history.

== Participants ==
All clubes are invited

| State | Club |
|---|---|
| (Minas Gerais) MG | Atlético Mineiro |
| (São Paulo (state)) SP | Ferroviária |
| (São Paulo (state)) SP | São Paulo |
| (Minas Gerais) MG | Uberlândia |

== São Paulo FC first goalkeeper goal ==
The competition regulations provided for a curiosity: in case of a penalty foul signaled by the referee, the penalty taker should necessarily be the goalkeeper of the benefited team. This fact occurred in the match between Uberlândia and São Paulo, when the goalkeeper Moscatto scored the goal of the São Paulo's victory. The event took place about a year and a half before Rogério Ceni scored his first goal.

== Tournament ==
The tournament was held in knockout mode:

Semi-finals; July 15
(Minas Gerais) Uberlândia | 1
(São Paulo (state)) São Paulo | 2
(Minas Gerais) Atlético Mineiro | 1 (1)
(São Paulo (state)) Ferroviária | 1 (3)

Final; July 16
(São Paulo (state)) São Paulo | 0 (5)
(São Paulo (state)) Ferroviária | 0 (4)
Third place July 16
(Minas Gerais) Uberlândia | 2
(Minas Gerais) Atlético Mineiro | 1

== See also ==
- 1995 São Paulo FC season
- List of goals scored by Rogério Ceni
- List of goalscoring goalkeepers
