= Daniel Franco (Brazilian footballer) =

Brazilian footballer (born 1971)

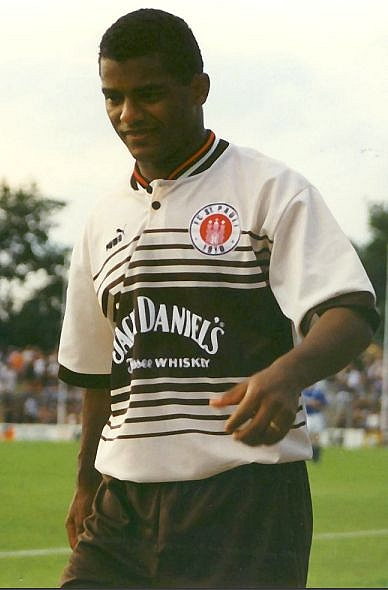
- Daniel da Costa Franco playing for FC St. Pauli

Personal information
- Full name: Daniel da Costa Franco
- Date of birth: 26 August 1971 (age 55)
- Place of birth: Butiá, Brazil
- Height: 1.78 m (5 ft 10 in)
- Position: Left-back

Team information
- Current team: Inhumas (head coach)

Youth career
- 1985–1989: Internacional

Senior career*
Years	Team	Apps	(Gls)
1990–1993	Internacional	107	(6)
1994–1995	Corinthians	36	(4)
1996	Atlético Mineiro	8	(1)
1996–1998	Bahia	6	(0)
1997	→ Avaí (loan)		
1997–1998	→ FC St. Pauli (loan)	8	(0)
1999	Brasil de Pelotas		
2000	Inter de Limeira	7	(2)
2000	Esportivo	3	(0)
2001	São José-RS		
2001	Avaí		
2002	Fortaleza		
2002	Brasil de Pelotas		
2003	Santa Cruz-RS		

Managerial career
- 2016: União Frederiquense
- 2017: Três Passos
- 2018: Lajeadense
- 2018: América-GO
- 2019–2022: União Frederiquense
- 2022: São Luiz
- 2023: Santa Cruz-RS
- 2024: Inter-SM
- 2024–: Inhumas
- * Club domestic league appearances and goals

Daniel da Costa Franco (born 26 August 1971) is a Brazilian football coach and former player who played as a left-back. He is the current head coach of Inhumas.

== Honours ==
=== Player ===
Internacional

- Copa do Brasil: 1992, 1995
- Campeonato Gaúcho: 1991, 1992, 1994

Corinthians

- Campeonato Paulista: 1995
- Copa do Brasil: 1995

=== Coach ===
União Frederiquense

- Campeonato Gaúcho Série A2: 2021

Santa Cruz-RS

- Campeonato Gaúcho Série A2: 2023
