= Moscatto =

Brazilian footballer

Personal information
- Full name: José Augusto Buoro Moscatto
- Date of birth: 11 November 1972 (age 53)
- Place of birth: Jaú, Brazil
- Position: Goalkeeper

Youth career
- XV de Jáu

Senior career*
Years	Team	Apps	(Gls)
1987–1994	XV de Jáu		
1995	Novorizontino		
1995	São Paulo	2	(1)
1996	XV de Piracicaba		
- * Club domestic league appearances and goals as of 2 March 2022

José Augusto Buoro Moscatto (born 11 November 1972), is a Brazilian retired professional footballer who played as a goalkeeper.

His greatest achievement as a football athlete was that he scored the first goalkeeper goal in the history of São Paulo FC, about 1 year before Rogério Ceni, the world record goalscoring goalkeeper, scored his first goal for the club.

== See also ==
- 1995 São Paulo FC season
- Torneio Rei Dadá
- List of goals scored by Rogério Ceni
- List of goalscoring goalkeepers
