= Tupãzinho =

Tupãzinho may refer to:

- Tupãzinho (footballer, 1939-1986) full name José Ernâni da Rosa, Brazilian football striker
- Tupãzinho (footballer, born 1968), full name Pedro Francisco Garcia, Brazilian football midfielder
