= Florisvaldo de Oliveira =

Brazilian serial killer (1958–2012)

- Born: November 18, 1958; Uchoa, Brazil
- Died: September 26, 2012 (aged 53); Pindamonhangaba, Brazil
- Cause of death: Murdered by assailants
- Other name: "Cabo Bruno" or Justiceiro
- Conviction: Murder
- Penalty: 113 years' imprisonment, released after 29 years

Details
- Victims: 50+
- Span of crimes: 1982–1983
- Country: Brazil
- State: São Paulo
- Date apprehended: September 22, 1983

Florisvaldo de Oliveira (November 18, 1958 – September 26, 2012), commonly known as "Cabo Bruno", was a Brazilian vigilante, serial killer and former officer of the Military Police of São Paulo State accused of more than 50 murders on the outskirts of São Paulo during the 1980s. Considered "one of the most controversial characters in crime journalism", he initially admitted to these deaths, but later denied them in his testimony.

== Biography ==
Florisvaldo de Oliveira was born in Uchoa in São Paulo State. The nickname "Cabo Bruno" came from his childhood in Catanduva, derived from a provocation by his friends comparing him to a local alcoholic called Bruno. Even his mother began to exclusively call him by the nickname. (Note: Florisvaldo was a soldier but did not have the rank of corporal; the title was just part of his nickname.) Cabo Bruno was known as a "justiceiro," a type of vigilante who is contracted to kill others, generally from the urban periphery. It was said that he killed "due to hating outlaws", although testimonials suggested that some executions were motivated by the victims' appearance.

He acted, almost always on his days off, in the Pedreira neighborhood in the district of Jabaquara, São Paulo. One resident, speaking anonymously in a 2000 interview on local crime, claimed that "in his time there was not so much insecurity." Local business owners were allegedly his biggest clients, something he denied. José Aparecido Benedito was the only survivor of Cabo Bruno's killings: after being shot, he pretended to be dead and managed to escape. Reports from journalist Caco Barcellos made him notorious, as he covered the criminal's last imprisonment for Jornal Nacional. Most of the shootings that he was charged with took place in 1982, with the many bodies riddled with bullets found in the region during that year causing panic. The cars he used—a Chevrolet Chevette, Ford Maverick and a Chevrolet Opala—which routinely had their colors changed, also helped elevate his fame.

He was arrested for the first time on September 22, 1983, by court order, after being accused of more than twenty murders (being recognized by several witnesses), although he confessed to only one: on February 6, 1982, in the Favela of Jardim Selma, in which he was identified by a surviving friend of the victim. Many years later he would admit to about twenty murders, and according to his second wife, maintained that "The other [victims], they pinned on me. There were people who killed and presented themselves as Cabo Bruno." According to her, he took responsibility as "it would not make much difference." At that time, the São Paulo Military Police estimated that Cabo Bruno and at least twelve police officers, including two officials (a captain and a lieutenant), were responsible for several executions in the city's South Zone. Police further reported that many of the executions had been made based solely on the victim's appearance, including a boy killed because of a small cross tattooed on his wrist—to Cabo Bruno, any tattoo indicated a criminal, even if it was specifically done for religious reasons. When the investigations began, the gang was apparently protected by higher ranks, but the sufficient accumulation of evidence and clues led to the collaboration of the whole organization.

After 12 trials—in one of which, several fellow police officers appeared at the court to apply pressure, but the evidence was overwhelming—Cabo Bruno was sentenced to 113 years in prison. After breaking out three times, with the last escape happening on May 30, 1991, he was detained at the José Augusto César Salgado Penitentiary in Tremembé. He claimed to have become an evangelical and said he preferred not to be called Bruno. In 1998, an exhibition of oil-on-acrylic paintings by him was held in São Paulo. In July 2008, as a pastor in the ecumenical chapel of the prison, he married a woman who worked as a volunteer. In his work as a pastor, Lindemberg Alves became one of his followers.

== Release and death ==
In 2009, after completing one sixth of his sentence, he requested the conversion to a semi-open regime. The Ministério Público Estadual requested a criminological–psychosocial examination, done in two stages and with favorable opinions to the change, which was granted on August 19.

Despite the semi-open regime, on that year he was denied the benefit of temporary leave, which he would only be eligible for after 2017, due to his history of escaping. However, on August 22, 2012, the Taubaté court granted him freedom after 27 years of imprisonment. In addition to the assessment of the prosecutor, which was based on a law prescribing for the definitive release of prisoners with good behavior and imprisonment for more than twenty years, documents with praise from officials and from P2's own management regarding his conduct in prison strengthened the decision. He had the original release order laminated and thereafter always carried a copy with him, along with a list of ten dreams that he would like to accomplish before he died. "In my escapes, they [the police] would always stop me," he complained in a joking tone. "Now that I have the [release] order, no one will stop me anymore."

Just over a month after leaving prison, Cabo Bruno was killed with eighteen to twenty shots in the neighborhood Quadra Coberta, in Pindamonhangaba, around 11:30 pm on September 26, 2012. He was returning from a religious service in the municipality of Aparecida accompanied by relatives, which were unharmed when he was gunned down. According to preliminary information from the Military Police, two men arrived on foot and shot only at him, with no robbery being announced, and there was a car near the scene, possibly used by the shooters in their escape. With no leads on the perpetrators, it was treated as a likely execution, to be investigated by the Civil Police. As he was declared dead at the scene, Bruno was not taken to a hospital; crime scene experts collected shell casings from a .40 Smith & Wesson and another weapon, a .380 ACP.

== See also ==
- List of serial killers in Brazil
- List of serial killers by number of victims
