= Bruno Mendes (footballer, born 1976) =

Portuguese footballer

Personal information
- Full name: Bruno Miguel da Cunha Sousa Oliveira Mendes
- Date of birth: 15 March 1976 (age 50)
- Place of birth: Carregado, Portugal
- Height: 1.85 m (6 ft 1 in)
- Position: Centre back

Youth career
- 1987–1989: Carregado
- 1989–1994: Vilafranquense

Senior career*
Years	Team	Apps	(Gls)
1994–1998	Vilafranquense		
1998–2001	Campomaiorense	43	(0)
2001–2010	Rio Ave	161	(3)
Total		204	(3)
- * Club domestic league appearances and goals

Bruno Miguel da Cunha Sousa Oliveira Mendes (born 15 March 1976 in Carregado, Lisbon) is a Portuguese retired footballer who played as a central defender.

== Club career ==
After making his Primeira Liga debut in the 1998–99 season with S.C. Campomaiorense, which folded soon after, Mendes moved to Rio Ave FC, going on to play in the club for nearly a decade and becoming one of the players with most matches in the Vila do Conde side's all-time list with more than 150 overall, only behind Evandro and Niquinha.

In the 2008–09 campaign, after helping Rio Ave to a top flight promotion, Mendes was an undisputed defensive starter, partnering former FC Porto's Gaspar in the middle and scoring in a 2–4 home loss against Vitória de Guimarães on 3 January 2009.

In 2009–10, Rio Ave again managed to retain their top division status, but he only contributed with two games, retiring at the end of the season aged 34.
