= Benjamin Abdala Júnior =

Brazilian writer, scholar, and literary critic

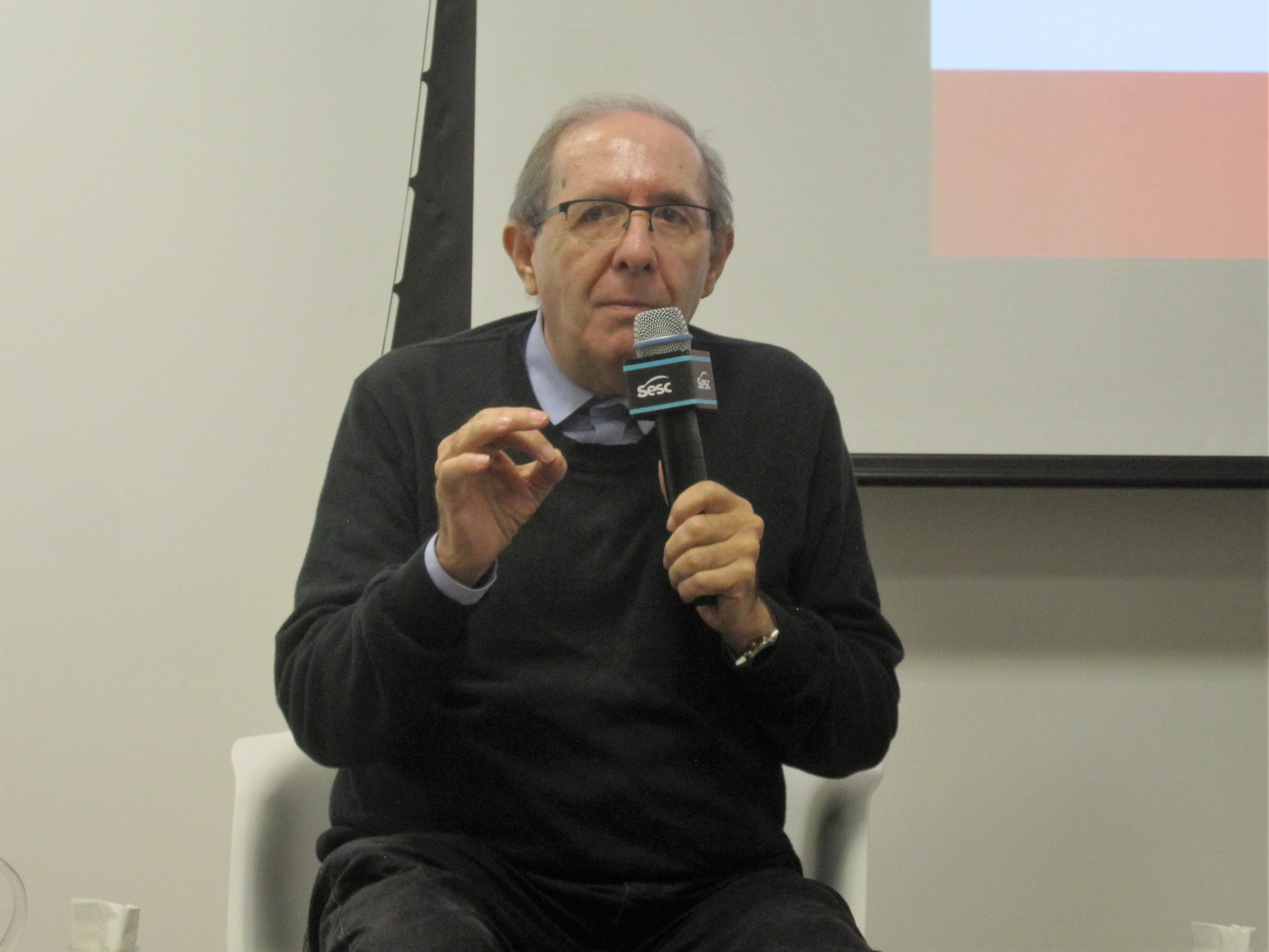
Junior in 2017.

Benjamin Abdala Júnior (born 1943 in Uchoa, São Paulo) is a Brazilian writer, scholar, and literary critic. His first book, A Escrita Neo-Realista, was published in 1981. He published the book Antologia da Poesia Brasileira - Realismo/Parnasianismo in 1985. He has written over 40 published books and hundreds of chapters in book collection, articles in newspapers and literary magazines. He has worked with the main Brazilian Scientific Agencies (CNPq, CAPES, FAPESP) evaluating scholarships and grants requested by researchers from the main Brazilian universities. Benjamin has also lived in Portugal and France, where he expanded his research and gave lectures on Comparative, Portuguese and African Literatures. He has been invited to the main universities in Africa, China, United States, Canada, France, England, Portugal, Austria, Tchecoslovaquia, Russia and Chile, giving lectures on African Literatures of Portuguese Speaking Countries, Comparative Literature, Neo-realism in Portugal and Brazil, among other subjects. Grandson of Lebanese immigrants, he received a Merit Medal celebrating 130 years of Middle Eastern Immigration to South America from BibliASPA - Biblioteca e Centro de Pesquisa América do Sul - Países Árabes. He has 3 children and 3 grandchildren, and lives in São Paulo. He is retired from University of São Paulo after 35 years of contribution as professor and administrator, but he is still actively involved in the Faculdade de Filosofia, Letras and Ciencias Humanas (College of Philosophy, Language and Humanities) as a researcher.

== Published books, coordinator ==
- Estudos comparados: teoria, crítica e metodologia. 1. ed. Cotia (SP): Ateliê Editorial, 2014. v. 1. 466 p.
- Silva, R. V. R. E. (Org.) . Literatura e memória política. 1. ed. Cotia (SP): Ateliê Editorial, 2014. v. 1. 385 p.
- Pinto, A. J. A. (Org.); Silva, A. R. (Org.), Esse entre-lugar da literatura: concepção estética e fronteiras. 1. ed. São Paulo: Arte e Ciência, 2013. v. 1. 317 p.
- Literatura comparada e relações comunitárias, hoje. 1. ed. Cotia: Ateliê Editorial, 2012. v. 1. 333 p.
- Literatura, história e política - 2ª edição. 2ª. ed. Cotia: Ateliê Editorial, 2007. 285 p.
- Literaturas de Língua Portuguesa: Marcos e Marcas - Portugal. 1ª. ed. São Paulo: Editora Arte & Ciência, 2007. 363 p.
- Cara, S. A. (Org.), Moderno de nascença: figurações críticas do Brasil. São Paulo: Boitempo Editorial, 2006. 244 p.
- MARQUEZINI, F. B. C. (Org.), Via Atlântica N. 9. São Paulo: ECLLP/FFLCH/USP, 2006. v. 9. 280 p.
- Cara, S. A. (Org.), Via Atlântica N. 8. 8. ed. São Paulo: ECLLP/FFLCH/USP, 2005. 308 p.
- Melhores poemas de Antero de Quental. 1. ed. São Paulo: Global Editora, 2004. v. 1. 115 p.
- Margens da cultura: mestiçagens, hibridismo & outras misturas. São Paulo: Boitempo Editorial, 2004. v. 1. 182 p.
- Scarpelli, M. O. F. (Org.), Portos flutuantes. Trânsitos ibero-afro-americanos. Cotia: Ateliê Editorial, 2004. 371 p.
- De vôos e ilhas. Literatura e comunitarismos. 1ª. ed. Cotia (SP): Ateliê Editorial, 2003. 312 p.
- Incertas relações. Brasil e Portugal no século XX. São Paulo: Editora SENAC São Paulo, 2003. 184 p.
- Revista da Biblioteca Mário de Andrade - Carlos Drummond de Andrade: 100 Anos. São Paulo: Secretaria Municipal da Cultura, 2003. v. 1. 144 p.
- Fronteiras múltiplas, identidades plurais - um ensaio sobre mestiçagem e hibridismo cultural. 1ª. ed. São Paulo: Editora SENAC São Paulo, 2002. 179 p.
- Mota, L. D. (Org.). Personae: grandes personagens da literatura brasileira. São Paulo: Editora SENAC, 2001. 328 p.
- Ecos do Brasil. Eça de Queirós, leituras brasileiras e portuguesas. São Paulo: Editora SENAC São Paulo, 2000. 200 p.
- Revista da Biblioteca Mario de Andrade. São Paulo: SECRETARIA MUNICIPAL DE CULTURA, 1998. 160 p.
- Poesia Contemporanea. São Paulo: INSTITUTO CULTURAL ITAU, 1997. 48 p.+
- Alexandre, I. . Canudos - Palavra de Deus, Sonho da Terra. São Paulo: BOITEMPO/SENAC, 1997. 160 p.
- Parnasianismo/Simbolismo. São Paulo: INSTITUTO CULTURAL ITAU, 1997. 48 p.
- Parnasianismo/Simbolismo. São Paulo: ITAU CULTURAL, 1997. 54 p.
- Revista da Biblioteca Mario de Andrade (Editor). São Paulo: SECRETARIA MUNICIPAL DA CULTURA, 1997. 160 p.
- Gil Vicente. São Paulo: SENAC OBS.: PREMIO DE EXCELENCIA GRAFICA DE 1996, 1996. 128 p.
- Romantismo. São Paulo: INSTITUTO CULTURAL ITAU, 1995. 48 p.
- Introducao A Analise Narrativa. São Paulo: SCIPIONE, 1995. 96 p.
- Movimentos e Estilos Literarios. São Paulo: SCIPIONE, 1994. 96 p.
- Contos Brasileiros. São Paulo: SCIPIONE, 1993. 96 p.
- O Romance Social Brasileiro. São Paulo: SCIPIONE, 1993. 96 p.
- Camões - Épica e Lírica. São Paulo - SP: SCIPIONE, 1993. 96 p.
- Imaginação Política. São Paulo: FFLCH/USP, 1988. 240 p.
- Literatura, História e Política. São Paulo: ATICA, 1988. 210 p.
- Tempos da Literatura Brasileira (4 Edicoes). São Paulo: ATICA, 1985. 320 p.
- Antologia da Poesia Brasielira. Realismo e Parnasianismo. São Paulo: ATICA, 1985. 80 p.
- Vieira. São Paulo: EDITORA TRES, 1984. 24 p.
- Almeida Garrett. São Paulo: EDITORA TRES, 1984. 24 p.
- Camilo Castelo Branco. São Paulo: EDITORA TRES, 1984. 24 p.
- Eça de Queirós. São Paulo: EDITORA TRES, 1984. 24 p.
- João Cabral de Melo Neto. São Paulo: ABRIL, 1982. 148 p.
- Ziraldo. São Paulo: Abril, 1982. 148 p.
- História Social da Literatura Portuguesa (5 Edições). São Paulo: Ática, 1982. 320 p.
- Jose Lins do Rego. São Paulo: ABRIL, 1982. 248 p.
- A Escrita Neo-Realista. São Paulo: ATICA, 1981. 128 p.
- Clarice Lispector (4 Edicoes). São Paulo: ABRIL, 1981. 148 p.
- Eçaa de Queirós (4 Edicoes). São Paulo: ABRIL, 1980. 148 p.
- Representacao e Participacao: A Dinâmica do Concreto Nos Romances de Carlos de Oliveira e Graciliano Ramos. São Paulo: FFLCH/USP, 1977. 240 p.
- BECHARA, L. . Proposta Curricular de Tecnicas de Redação Em Lingua Portuguesa Para Ao Paulo. São Paulo: CENP/Secretaria Estadual de Educação, 1977. 64 p.
- O Processo de Fundamentação da Escritura Nos Romances de Carlos de Oliveira. São Paulo: FFLCH/USP, 1973. 128 p.

== Chapters in book collections ==
- "Redação de 6 Verbetes (Realismo)". In: Cultrix. (Org.), PEQUENO DICIONÁRIO DE LITERATURA PORTUGUESA. São Paulo: CULTRIX, 1981, v. , p. -.
- "Prefacio de O Crime do Padre Amaro". In: Eça de Queirós (Author). (Org.), O CRIME DO PADRE AMARO. São Paulo: ATIC', 1982, v. , p. 03-09.
- "Os Ritmos do Tempo Em Torno do Engenho". In: Rego, José Lins. (Org.), FOGO MORTO. São Paulo: CIRCULO DO LIVRO, 1987, v. , p. 273-280.
- "Ideologia e Linguagem Nos Romances de Graciliano Ramos". In: A. Bosi; J. C. Garbuglio; V. Facioli. (Org.). GRACILIANO RAMOS. São Paulo: ATICA, 1987, v. , p. 398-406.
- "Abdala Junior, B.; Campedelli, S. Y., Vozes da Critica". In: Benedito Nunes. (Org.). A PAIXAO SEGUNDO GH. PARIS, BRASILIA: ARCHIVES/CNPQ, 1988, v. , p. 196-209.
- "Apresentação". In: Torres, Alexandre Pinheiro. (Org.), ESPINGARDAS E MUSICA CLASSICA. São Paulo: ESTação LIBERDADE, 1989, v. , p. 05-08.
- "Agostinho Neto e A Poética Subjacente Ao Caderno Poesia Negra de Expressão Portuguesa". In: Organizadores. (Org.). A VOZ IGUAL. Porto - Portugal: FUND. ANTONIO DE ALMEIDA, 1990, v. , p. 11-21.
- "Imagens Na ação Política". In: L. F. Trigueiros; L. P. Duarte. (Org.), TEMAS PORTUGUESES E BRASILEIROS. LISBOA: INSTITUTO DE CULTURA PORTUGUESA, 1992, v. , p. 517-538.
- "O Sonho do Escritor e As Aspirações do Crítico". In: Helder Macedo. (Org.), STUDIES IN PORTUGUESE LITERATURE AND HISTORY. LONDON: TAMESIS BOOKS, 1993, v. , p. 199-206.
- "Apresentação". In: J. C. Magdalena. (Org.). UM SECULO DE SILENCIO. São Paulo: SENAC, 1997, v. , p. 09-11.
- "Monteiro Lobato". In: W. Sacchetta et alii. (Org.). MONTEIRO LOBATO: FURACÃO NA BOTOCUNDIA. São Paulo: SENAC-SP, 1997, v. , p. -.
- "A Historia Literaria e O Ensino de Literaturas de Língua Portuguesa". In: M. H. N. Garcez; R. L. Rodrigues. (Org.). O MESTRE- HOMENAGEM A ANTONIO SOARES AMORA. São Paulo: CEP/ECLLP/AL, 1997, v. , p. 31-40.
- "Estado e Nação Nas Literaturas de Lingua Portuguesa". In: A. M. Brito; F. Oliveira; I. P. Lima; R. M. Martelo. (Org.). SENTIDO QUE A VIDA FAZ: ESTUDOS PARA OSCAR LOPES. PORTO: CAMPO DAS LETRAS, 1997, v. , p. 241-248.
- "De Convicçoes e Heterodoxias". In: C. A. Iannone; M. V. Z. Gobi; R. S. Junqueira. (Org.). SOBRE AS NAUS DA INICIAÇÃO: ESTUDOS PORTUGUESES DE LITERATURA E HISTORIA. São Paulo: EDUNESP, 1998, v. , p. 195-206.
- "Tarsila, Amora, Amorável do Amaral". In: Nádia Battella Gotlib. (Org.). TARSILA A MOPDERNISTA. São Paulo: SENAC - SP, 1998, v. , p. -.
- "Prefacio". In: E. Madruga. (Org.). NAS TRILHAS DA DESCOBERTA (REPERCUSSÃO DO MODERNISMO BRASILEIRO NA LITERATURA ANGOLANA). JOAO PESSOA: IMPRENSA UNIVERSITARIA, 1998, v. , p. 7-9.
- "Verbetes Relativos As Literaturas de Lingua Portuguesa". In: Nova Cultural / Folha de S.Paulo. (Org.). GRANDE ENCICLOPEDIA LAROUSSE CULTURAL. São Paulo: NOVA CULTURAL / FOLHA DE SAO PAULO / O GLOBO, 1998, v. , p. -.
- "ApresentAÇÃO". In: Marcos Losekann. (Org.). O RONCO DA POROROCA. São Paulo: SENAC-SP, 1999, v. , p. -.
- "GlobalizAÇÃO e Comunitarismos: Narrativas de Viagem e Fronteiras Culturais". In: Luiza Lobo. (Org.). GLOBALIZAÇÃO E LITERATURA - DISCURSOS TRANSCULTURAIS. RIO DE JANEIRO: RELUME DUMARA, 1999, v. , p. 21-35.
- "Globalização, cultura e identidade em Orlanda Amarilis". In: Carvalhal, Tânia Franco; Tutikian, Jane. (Org.). Literatura e história. Três vozes de expressão portuguesa. Porto Alegre: EDUFRGS, 1999, v. 1, p. 09-20.
- "Narrativas de viagem e fronteiras culturais". In: Duarte, Lélia Parreira. (Org.). Para sempre em mim: homenagem a Ângela Vaz Leão. Belo Horizonte: CESPUC, 1999, v. , p. 286-294.
- "Antonio Candido: Formação da literatura brasileira". In: Mota, Lourenço Dantas. (Org.). Introdução ao Brasil: um banquete no trópico. São Paulo: Editora SENAC São Paulo, 1999, v. , p. 357-379.
- "Viagem e solidariedade em Casa da Malta, de Fernando Namora". In: Silveira, Jorge Fernandes. (Org.). Escrever a casa portuguesa. Belo Horizonte: Editora UFMG, 1999, v. , p. 79-90.
- "Abraços que sufocam". In: Espinosa, Roberto. (Org.). Abraços que sufocam e outros ensaios. São Paulo: Viramundo, 2000, v. , p. 09-16.
- "Eça de Queirós, o realismo e a circulação literária entre Portugal e o Brasil". In: Benjamin Abdala Jr.. (Org.). Ecos do Brasil. Eça de Queirós, leituras brasileiras e portuguesas. São Paulo: Editora SENAC São Paulo, 2000, v. , p. 89-117.
- "Apresentação". In: Benjamin Abdala Jr.. (Org.). Ecos do Brasil. Eça de Queirós, leituras brasileiras e portuguesas. São Paulo: Editora SENAC São Paulo, 2000, v. , p. -.
- "Como a cultura nos tem ensinado an olhar nosso corpo?". In: Renato da S. Queirós. (Org.). O corpo do brasileiro. Ensaios de estética e beleza. São Paulo: Editora SENAC São Paulo, 2000, v. , p. -.
- "A voz do professor". In: Adilson Citelli. (Org.). Comunicação e educação. A linguagem em movimento. São Paulo: Editora SENAC São Paulo, 2000, v. , p. -.
- "Prefácio". In: Roberto Espinosa (Author). (Org.). Abraços que sufocam e outros ensaios sobre a liberdade. São Paulo: Editora Viramundo, 2000, v. , p. 9-16.
- "Necessité et solidarité entre littératures de langue portugaise". In: Steven Tötösy de Zepetnek; Milan V. Dimic. (Org.). Comparative literature today: theories and practice/La littérature comparée d´aujoud´hui. Théories et réalisations. Paris: Honoré Champio, 2001, v. , p. -.
- "O pio da coruja e as cercas de Paulo Honório". In: Benjamin Abdala Junior; Lourenço Dantas Mota. (Org.). Personae: grandes personagens da literatura brasileira. São Paulo: Editora SENAC, 2001, v. , p. 163-194.
- "Abdala Junior, B.; Mota, L. D., Apresentação". In: Benjamin Abdala Junior; Lourenço Dantas Mota. (Org.). Personae: grandes personagens da literatura brasileira. São Paulo: Editora SENAC, 2001, v. , p. 9-11.
- "De percursos e distâncias: entre dois finais de século". In: Marli de Oliveira Fantini Scarpelli; Paulo Motta Oliveira. (Org.). Os centenários: Eça, Freyre e Nobre. Belo Horizonte: Faculdade de Letras da UFMG, 2001, v. , p. 35-50.
- "Silvio Romero - História da Literatura Brasileira". In: Lourenço Dantas Mota. (Org.). Introdução ao Brasil. Um banquete no trópico. : , 2001, v. 2, p. 189-217.
- "Mundialização e comunitarismo: origens da consciência nacional na literatura caboverdiana". In: E. F. Coutinho. (Org.). Fronteiras imaginadas: cultura nacional/teoria internacional. Rio de Janeiro: Aeroplano Editora, 2001, v. , p. 273-285.
- "Prefácio". In: Conceição Flores. (Org.). Do mito ao romance: uma leitura do evangelho segundo Saramago. Natal: Editora da UFRN, 2001, v. , p. III-.
- "Fronteiras múltiplas e hibridismo cultural". In: Scarpelli, M. F.; Duarte, E. A.. (Org.). Poéticas da diversidade. Belo Horizonte: UFMG, 2002, v. , p. 15-35.
- "Dona Flor, em longa metragem". In: DUARTE, C. L.; DUARTE, E. A.; BEZERRA, K. C.. (Org.). Gênero e representação na literatura brasileira. Belo Horizonte: UFMG, 2002, v. , p. 275-290.
- "De vôos e ilhas - imagens utópicas do mito em recortes clásicos e contemporâneos". In: MARDATO, Izabel. (Org.). Figuras da lusofonia. Lisboa: Instituto Camões, 2002, v. , p. 158-171.
- "Notas sobre utopia em Pepetela". In: CHAVES, Rita; MACEDO, Tânia. (Org.). PORTANTO.... PEPETELA. Luanda: Edições Chá de Caxinde, 2002, v. , p. 197-204.
- "Abrindo caminhos". In: CANIATO, B. L.; MINÉ, E.. (Org.). Abrindo caminhos. Homenagem a Maria Aparecida Santilli. São Paulo: FFLCH/USP, 2002, v. , p. 9-14.
- "Angola também é aqui". In: Macedo, T.. (Org.). Angola e Brasil - estudos comparados. São Paulo: Arte & Ciência, 2002, v. , p. 9-11.
- "Notas sobre a utopia, em Pepetela". In: Chaves, R.; Macedo, T. C.. (Org.). Portanto... Pepetela. Luanda: Chá de Caxinde, 2003, v. , p. 197-204.
- "Angola também é aqui". In: Macedo, Tania. (Org.). Angola e Brasil - estudos comparados. São Paulo: Ciência & Arte, 2003, v. , p. 9-11.
- "Apresentação: ensaios de relações e relações comunitárias". In: ABDALA JR, B.. (Org.). Incertas relações. Brasil-Portugal no século XX. São Paulo: Editora SENAC São Paulo, 2003, v. , p. 09-35.
- "Antonio Jacinto, José Craveirinha, Solano Trindade - o sonho (diurno) de uma poética popular". In: Chaves, R,; Secco, C.L.T.; Macedo, T.. (Org.). Brasil/Africa: como se o mar fosse mentira. Maputo: Imprensa Universitária/Universidade E. Mondlane, 2003, v. , p. 75-86.
- "Narrativas de viagem e fronteiras culturais". In: Matos, E.; Cavalcante, N.; Lopez, T.A.P.; Lima, Y.D.. (Org.). A presença de Castello. São Paulo: Humanitas, 2003, v. , p. 141-154.
- "História literária e ensino de literaturas de língua portuguesa". In: Becker, P.; Barbosa, M.H.S.. (Org.). Questões de literatura. Passo Fundo: Universidade de Passo Fundo, 2003, v. , p. 13-26.
- "Utopia e dualidade no contato de culturas: o nascimento da literatura caboverdiana". In: Leão, A. V.. (Org.). Contatos e ressonâncias. Belo Horizonte: Editora PUCMinas, 2003, v. , p. 209-236.
- "Antero de Quental, as margens da esperança". In: Caniato, B. J.; Guimarães, E.. (Org.). Linhas e entrelinhas: homenagem a Nelly Novaes Coelho. São Paulo: Editora Casemiro, 2003, v. , p. 46-55.
- Castro, E. M. G. M. E. . Carta-depoimento enviada a Benjamin Abdala Junior como resposta a seu questionário/entrevista (Entrevista em Livro)". In: Lemos, F.; Leite, R. M.. (Org.). A missão portuguesa: rotas entrecruzadas. São Paulo: Edunesp, 2003, v. , p. 94-100.
- "As margens da alegria: perspectivando a cultura brasileira". In: Duarte, Lélia Parreira. (Org.). Veredas de Rosa II. Belo Horizonte: Editora PUCMinas, 2003, v. , p. 92-102.
- "Antero de Quental, cidadão e poeta: a esperança como princípio". In: Benjamin Abdala Junior. (Org.). Melhores poemas de Antero de Quental. 1 ed. São Paulo: Global Editora, 2004, v. 1, p. 9-29.
- "Um ensaio de abertura: mestiçagem e hibridismo, globalização e comunitarismo". In: Benjamin Abdala Junior. (Org.). Margens da cultura: mestiçagem, hibridismo & outras misturas. São Paulo: Boitempo Editorial, 2004, v. 1, p. 9-20.
- "Apresentação". In: Garmes, Hélder. (Org.). Oriente, engenho e arte. Imprensa e literatura de língua portuguesa em Goa, Macau e Timor Leste. São Paulo: Alameda, 2004, v. , p. 7-8.
- "Timor, no horizonte da língua portuguesa". In: Garmes, Hélder. (Org.). Oriente, engenho e arte. Imprensa e literatura de língua portuguesa em Goa, Macau e Timor Leste. São Paulo: Alameda, 2004, v. , p. 107-114.
- "Abdala Junior, B.; Scarpelli, M. O. F., Apresentação". In: Abdala Jr, B; Scarpelli, M. F.. (Org.). Portos flutuantes. Trânsitos ibero-afro-anericanos. Cotia: Ateliê Editorial, 2004, v. , p. 11-13.
- "Globalização e novas perspectivas comunitárias". In: Abdala Jr., B; Scarpelli, M. F.. (Org.). Porto flutuantes. Trânsitos ibero-afro-americanos. Cotia: Ateliê Editorial, 2004, v. , p. 61-72.
- "Prefácio". In: GOES, M. L.. (Org.). Sonho - Terra - Homem. Estudo da obra de Francisco Marins. São Paulo: Clíper Editora, 2004, v. , p. 11-12.
- "De percursos e distâncias entre dois finais de século". In: Filisola, A.; Cardoso, P. S.; Oliveira, P.M.; Junqueira, R.S. (Org.). Verdade, amor, razão, merecimento: coisas do mundo e de quem nela anda. Curitiba: Editora da UFPR, 2005, v. , p. 115-126.
- "Poder simbólico e comunitarismos: fluxos ibero-afro-americanos". In: Jobim, José Luís et al.. (Org.). Sentidos dos lugares. Rio de Janeiro: Eduerj/Abralic, 2005, v. , p. -.
- "Olhares para a banda de lá". In: D´Angelo, Biagio. (Org.). Confluencias e intercambios. La literatura comparada y el Perú hoy. Lima (Peru): Fondo Editorial de la UCSS, 2005, v. , p. -.
- "Códigos e habitus culturais: a dinâmica do diverso". In: CHAVES, R.; MACÊDO, T.; MATA, I.. (Org.). Boaventura Cardoso: a escrita em processo. São Paulo/Luanda: Alameda/UEA, 2005, v. , p. -.
- "Abdala Junior, B.; Cara, S. A. . Editorial". In: Abdala Junior, b.; Cara, S. A.. (Org.). Via Atlântica N. 8. São Paulo: ECLLP/FFLCH/USP, 2005, v. 8, p. 9-10.
- "Formação da literatura brasileira, de Antonio Candido". In: Benjamin Abdala Junior; Salete de Almeida Cara. (Org.). Moderno de nascença: figurações do Brasil. São Paulo: Boitempo editorial, 2006, v. , p. 255-276.
- "Panorama histórico da literatura angolana". In: Chaves, Rita; Macêdo, Tania. (Org.). Marcas da diferença: as literaturas africanas de língua portuguesa. São Paulo: Alameda: Fapesp, 2006, v. , p. 211-216.
- "A administração da diferença". In: Jobim, J. L.;Reis, L.;Secchin, A. C.;Rocha, J. C. C.;Souza, R. A.Q.;Almeida, C. M. P.. (Org.). Lugares dos discursos literários e culturais - o local, o regional, o nacional, o internacional, o planetário. Niterói: Editora da Universidade Federal Fluminense, 2006, v. , p. 40-53.
- "Antônio Jacinto, José Craveirinha, Solano Trindade - o sonho (diurno) de uma poética populat". In: Chaves, R.; Secco, C.; Macedo, T.. (Org.). Brasil/África: como se o mar fosse mentira. São Paulo; Luanda: Editora UNESP; Chá de Caxinde, 2006, v. , p. 69-78.
- "Abdala Junior, B.; Brito, R. H. P.; Faccina, R. L.; Busquets, V. L., O país e a motivação para o Projeto Universidades em Timor Leste". In: Regina Helena Pires de Brito; Rosemeire Leão Faccina; Vera Lúcia Busquets. (Org.). Sensibilizando para a comunicação em língua portuguesa. São Paulo: Mack Pesquisa, 2007, v. , p. 131-140.
- "Imagens de um Kalunga colonial". In: Chaves, R.; Macedo, T.; Vecchia, R. (Org.). A kinda e a misanga. Encontros brasileiros com a literatura angolana. São Paulo; Luanda: EDUNESP, NZILA, 2007, v. , p. 27-34.
- "Reimaginando a nação". In: Chaves, R.; Macedo, T.; Vecchia, R. (Org.). A kinda e a misanga. Encontros brasileiros com a Literatura Angolana. São Paulo: Luanda: EDUNESP: NDJILA, 2007, v. , p. 27-34.
- "Utopia e dualidade no contato de culturas: o nascimento da literatura caboverdiana". In: Tutikian, Jane; Brasil, Assis. (Org.). Mar horizonte: literaturas africanas lusófonas. Porto Alegre: Edipucrs, 2007, v. , p. 99-120.
- "O sonho e o projeto". In: PontesJr., G.; Almeida, C.. (Org.). Relações literárias internacionais: lusofonia e francofonia. Rio de Janeiro: Eduff; Instituto de Letras da UFRJ, 2007, v. , p. 182-198.
- "Debuxos, de Machado para Graciliano". In: Fantini, Marli. (Org.). Crônicas da antiga corte: literatura e memória em Machado de Assis. Belo Horizonte: Editora UFMG, 2008, v. , p. 233-249.
- "Observações sobre o intellectual e os caminhos da imaginação social". In: Nitrini, S; Pereira, H. B.C.; Leonel, M. C. Hossne, A. S.; Bastazin, V.; Levin, O.. (Org.). Literaturas, Artes, Saberes. São Paulo: Aderaldo & Rothschild/Abralic, 2008, v. , p. 23-42.
- "Graciliano, leitor de Machado". In: Secchin, Antonio Carlos; Bastos, Dau; Jobim, José Luís. (Org.). Machado de Assis: novas perspectivas sobre a obra e o author, no centenário de sua morte. 1a. ed. Rio de Janeiro; Niterói: De Letras; EdUFF, 2008, v. , p. 21-33.
- "Imaginário social e globalização". In: Santos, A. C.; Almeida, Cláudia; Pontes Jr., Geraldo. (Org.). Relações literárias internacionais II: intersecções e fricções entre fonias. Rio de Janeiro; Niterói: De Letras; EdUFF, 2008, v. , p. 73-84.
- "O Brasil e a América Latina: imagens literárias da travessia do rio". In: Silva, Agnaldo Rodrigues da. (Org.). Diálogos literários: literatura, comparativismo e ensino. Cotia: Ateliê Editorial, 2008, v. , p. 15-29.
- "No fluxo das águas: jangadas, margens e travessias". In: Santos, Paulo Sérgio Nolasco dos. (Org.). Literatura e práticas culturais. 1a. ed. Dourados: Editora da UFGD, 2009, v. , p. 11-26.
- "A literatura, a diferença e a condição intellectual". In: Remédios, M. L. R.; Silveira, R. C.. (Org.). Redes & capulanas: identidade, cultura e história nas literaturas lusófonas. Porto Alegre: Ed. UniRitter, 2009, v. , p. 63-85.
- "Notas sobre a Utopia, em Pepetela". In: Chaves, Rita: Macedo, Tania. (Org.). Portanto... Pepetela. 2ª ed. São Paulo: Ateliê Editorial, 2009, v. 1, p. 171-178.
- "Por linhas tortas". In: Fantini, Marli. (Org.). Machado e Rosa: leituras críticas. Cotia: Ateliê Editorial, 2010, v. , p. 131-141.
- "A distância crítica do narrador naturalista. O crime do padre Amaro, de Eça de Queirós. 16 ed. São Paulo: Ática, 2010, v. , p. 07-11.
- "Literatura, cultura e comunitarismos". In: Secco, C. L. T.; Salgado, M. T.; Jorge, S. R. (Org.). Pensando África: literatura, arte, cultura e ensino. Rio de Janeiro: Fundação Biblioteca Nacional, 2010, v. , p. 144-153.
- "Comunitarismo literário-cultural e a globalização: os países de língua portuguesa". In: Petar Petrov. (Org.). Lugares da lusofonia. Lisboa: Edições Colibri?Centro de Estudos Linguísticos e Literários da Universidade do Algarve, 2010, v. , p. 29-43.
- "Democracia e comunitarismos". In: Buescu, H.; Cerdeira, T. C. (Org.). Literatura Portuguesa e a Construção do Passado e do Futuro. Casal de Cambra (Portugal): Caleidoscópio, 2011, v. , p. 283-294.
- "Utopia e Dualidade no Contato de Culturas: o Nascimento da Literatura Caboverdiana". In: Ribeiro, M. C.; Jorge, S. R. (Org.). Literaturas Insulares: Leituras e Escritas de Cabo Verde e São Tomé e Príncipe. Porto (Portugal): Edições Afrontamento, 2011, v. , p. 81-98.
- "Eça e Machado nas Linhas Tortas de Graciliano". In: PETROV, P.; OLIVEIRA, M. G.. (Org.). A Primazia do Texto. Ensaios em homenagem a Maria Lúcia Lepecki. Lisboa (Portugal): Esfera do Caos Editores, 2011, v. , p. 273-284.
- "Literatura, história e política - Reflexões sobre um percurso crítico". In: Baumgarten, Carlos Alexandre. (Org.). História da Literatura: itinerários de perspectivas. Rio Grande: Editora da FURG, 2011, v. , p. 13-31.
- "Concepção de sujeito e experiência poética". In: Luiz Coronel. (Org.). Fernando Pessoa, um poeta predestinado. Porto Alegre: Tab Marketing, 2011, v. , p. 99-.
- "Notas críticas. Administração da diferença, preservação da hegemonia". In: Margato, Izabel; Gomes, Renato Cordeiro. (Org.). Literatura e revolução. Belo Horizonte: Editora UFMG, 2012, v. , p. 29-41.
- "Geocrítica, marcas eurocêntricas e comparatismo literário". In: Petrov, Petar; Sousa, Pedro Quintino de; López-Iglésias, Samartim; Feijóo, Elias Torres. (Org.). Avanços em Cultura e Comparatismo nas Lusofonias. 1 ed. Santiago de Compostela - Faro: Associação Internacional de Lusitanistas - Através Editora, 2012, v. , p. 25-45.
- "Literatura e política: a posição do intellectual, os comunitarismos supranacionais e a nova repactualização política". In: Ferreira, R. S. S.; Pereira, T. M. S.. (Org.). Literatura & política. Juiz de Fora (MG): Editora UFJF, 2012, v. , p. -.
- "Manuel Lopes". In: Rector, Monica; Vernon, Richard. (Org.). African Lusophone Writers. Chicago, IL - Estados Unidos: GALE - A Bruccoli Clarck Layman Book, 2012, v. 367, p. 102-105.
- "Agostinho Neto". In: Rector, Monica; Vernon, Richard. (Org.). African Lusophone Writers. Chicago, IL - Estados Unidos: GALE - A Bruccoli Clarck Layman Book, 2012, v. 367, p. 120-125.
- "Benjamin . Limiaridades identitárias: para uma geocrítica do eurocentrismo". In: FONSECA, M. N. S.; CURY, M. Z.. (Org.). África: dinâmicas culturais e literárias. 1 ed. Belo Horizonte: Editora PUC Minas, 2012, v. , p. 66-87.
- "Literatura e Política: José Craveirinha e as inclinações prospectivas de uma poética populat". In: CHAVES, R.; MACÊDO, T.. (Org.). Passagens para o Índico: encontros brasileiros com a literatura moçambicana. 1ª ed. Maputo: Marimbique, 2012, v. , p. 61-71.
- "Doze dias de Abril, sob teto de zinco". In: Silva, A. R.; Battista, E.; Maquêa, V. (Org.). Poéticas, políticas e representações literárias. 1 ed. São Paulo: Arte & Ciência Editora, 2012, v. 1, p. 71-82.
- "Medo, solidão e os horizontes comunitários". In: Oliveira, M. G.; Petrov, P.. (Org.). As vozes da Balada. 30º aniversário de Balada da Praia dos Cães, de José Cardoso Pires.. 1 ed. Lisboa: CLEPUL, 2012, v. 1, p. 132-136.
- "Os intelectuais e os caminhos da imaginação social. Reflexões sobre o neo-realismo, hoje". In: Margato, I.; Gomes, R. C.. (Org.). Novos realismos. 1 ed. Belo Horizonte: Editora UFMG, 2012, v. 1, p. 51-70.
- "Notas históricas: solidariedade e relações comunitárias nas literaturas dos países africanos de língua portuguesa". In: Tutikian, J.; Conte, D.. (Org.). Palavra Nação. 1ª ed. Porto Alegre: PPGL-UFRGS, 2012, v. 1, p. 141-152.
- "O mundo do rio e a ponte". In: Neves, José Alberto Pinho; Nogueira, Nícia Helena. (Org.). ROSA, João Guimarães. 1ª ed. Juiz de Fora: UFJF/Museu de Arte Murilo Mendes, 2012, v. 1, p. 113-131.
- "Doze dias de abril, sob teto de zinco". In: CHAVES, Rita; MACEDO, Tania; CAVACAS, Fernanda. (Org.). MIA COUTO: um convite à diferença. 1 ed. São Paulo: Humanitas, 2012, v. 1, p. 297-306.
- "Imaginário social e globalização: o diálogo possível". In: CRUZ, A. D.; ALVES, L. K.. (Org.). Literatura e sociedade no contexto Latino-americano. 1ª ed. Cascavel: Edunioeste, 2012, v. III, p. 281-292.
- "O poeta e os enredamentos da 'vida menor'"". In: Coronel, L.. (Org.). Carlos Drummond de Andrade : a dimensão lírica do cotidiano. 1ª ed. Porto Alegre: Tab Marketing, 2013, v. 1, p. 99-99.
- "Carlos de Oliveira: o intellectual, a política e a literatura - um depoimento sob anos de chumbo". In: Alves, Ida. (Org.). Coisas desencadeadas estudos sobre an obra de Carlos de Oliveira. 1 ed. Rio de Janeiro: Oficina Raquel, 2013, v. , p. 17-35.
- "Uma história de barcas e travessias". In: Vicente, Gil. (Org.). Auto da Barca do Inferno. 1ª ed. São Paulo: FTD, 2013, v. , p. 5-9.
- "Asymmetric Cultural Flows and Community Reflections". In: João Cezar de Castro Rocha. (Org.). Lusofonia and its futures. 1 ed. North Dartmouth: Tagus Press Books, 2013, v. 25, p. 15-24.
- "Globalização, cultura e identidade em Orlanda Amarílis, como Homenagem a Maria Aparecida Santilli". In: Motta, P. M.. (Org.). Travessias: D. João VI e o Mundo Lusófono. 1 ed. Cotia (SP): Ateliê Editorial, 2013, v. 1, p. 319-332.
- "Fluxos culturais assimétricos e reflexões comunitárias". In: Pinto, A. J. A.; Abdala Junior, B.; Silva, A. R.. (Org.). Esse entre-lugar da literatura: concepção estética e fronteiras. 1 ed. São Paulo: Arte e Ciência, 2013, v. 1, p. 11-25.
- "Globalização, cultura e identidade em Orlanda Amarílis". In: Anne Begenat-Neuschäfer; Flavio Quintale. (Org.). Vozes femininas de África. 1 ed. Frankfurt am Nain: Peter Lang Edition, 2014, v. 1, p. 59-72.
- "Do poder socioeconômico ao simbólico: pensar politicamente o comparatismo literário". In: Abdala Junior, B.. (Org.). Estudos comparados: teoria, crítica e metodologia. 1 ed. Cotia (SP): Ateliê Editorial, 2014, v. 1, p. 133-162.
