= Donizete Oliveira =

Brazilian footballer (born 1968)

Personal information
- Full name: Donizete Francisco de Oliveira
- Date of birth: 21 February 1968 (age 58)
- Place of birth: Bauru, Brazil
- Height: 1.76 m (5 ft 9 in)
- Position: Midfielder

Senior career*
Years	Team	Apps	(Gls)
1987–1989	Fluminense	44	(2)
1990–1991	Grêmio	30	(0)
1992–1994	Bragantino	48	(2)
1995	São Paulo	16	(0)
1996–1997	Cruzeiro	38	(1)
1998	Vitória	21	(0)
1999–2000	Cruzeiro	39	(0)
2001	Urawa Reds	7	(0)
2001–2002	Vasco da Gama	15	(0)
2003	Sporting Cristal		

International career
1990–2000	Brazil	6	(0)
- * Club domestic league appearances and goals

Donizete Francisco de Oliveira (born 21 February 1968), sometimes known as just Donizete, is a Brazilian former professional footballer who played as a midfielder.

== Career statistics ==
=== Club ===
Appearances and goals by club, season and competition
Club	Season	League		
Club	Season	Division	Apps	Goals
Fluminense	1987	Série A	7	0
Fluminense	1988	Série A	23	1
Fluminense	1989	Série A	14	1
Fluminense	Total		44	2
Grêmio	1990	Série A	19	1
Grêmio	1991	Série A	13	0
Grêmio	Total		32	1
Bragantino	1992	Série A	20	1
Bragantino	1993	Série A	13	0
Bragantino	1994	Série A	15	1
Bragantino	Total		48	2
São Paulo	1995	Série A	16	0
Cruzeiro	1996	Série A	19	0
Cruzeiro	1997	Série A	12	0
Cruzeiro	Total		31	0
Vitória	1998	Série A	19	0
Cruzeiro	1999	Série A	18	0
Cruzeiro	2000	Série A	21	0
Cruzeiro	Total		39	0
Vasco da Gama	2001	Série A	15	0
Urawa Reds	2001	J1 League	7	0
Palmeiras	2001	Série A	1	0
Vasco da Gama	2002	Série A	0	0
Career total			252	5

=== International ===
Appearances and goals by national team and year
National team	Year	Apps	Goals
Brazil	1990	3	0
Brazil	1991	2	0
Brazil	1992	0	0
Brazil	1993	0	0
Brazil	1994	0	0
Brazil	1995	0	0
Brazil	1996	0	0
Brazil	1997	0	0
Brazil	1998	0	0
Brazil	1999	0	0
Brazil	2000	1	0
Total		6	0
