= Bruno Méndez =

Bruno Méndez may refer to:

- Bruno Méndez (footballer) (born 1999), Uruguayan footballer
- Bruno Méndez (racing driver) (born 1990), Spanish racing driver
