= Uchoa =

- Municipality
- The Municipality of Uchoa
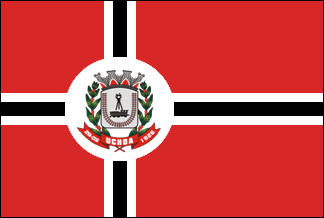
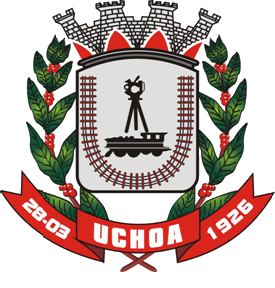
- Flag Coat of arms

- Location of Uchoa

- Location within Brazil
- Coordinates: 20°57′10″S 49°10′29″W
- Country: Brazil
- Region: Southeast
- State: São Paulo
- Established: 2009

Area
  - Total: 252.5 km^{2} (97.5 sq mi)
- Elevation: 485 m (1,591 ft)

Population (2020)
  - Total: 10,151
  - Density: 37.51/km^{2} (97.2/sq mi)
- Time zone: UTC−3 (BRT)
- Postal Code: 15890-000
- Area code: +55 17
- Website: Prefecture of Uchoa

Uchoa is a municipality in the state of São Paulo, Brazil. The population is of 10,151 inhabitants and the area is 252.5 km^{2}. Uchoa belongs to the Mesoregion of São José do Rio Preto.

== Economy ==
The Tertiary sector is the economic basis of Uchoa, corresponding to 62.27% of the city GDP. The Secondary sector is 21.83% of the GDP, and the Primary sector corresponds to 15.9%.

== Media ==
In telecommunications, the city was served by Telecomunicações de São Paulo. In July 1998, this company was acquired by Telefónica, which adopted the Vivo brand in 2012. The company is currently an operator of cell phones, fixed lines, internet (fiber optics/4G) and television (satellite and cable).

== Notable people ==
- Benjamin Abdala Júnior — Writer
- Florisvaldo de Oliveira — Serial killer

== See also ==
- List of municipalities in São Paulo
- Interior of São Paulo
