= Caio Ribeiro =

Brazilian footballer (born 1975)

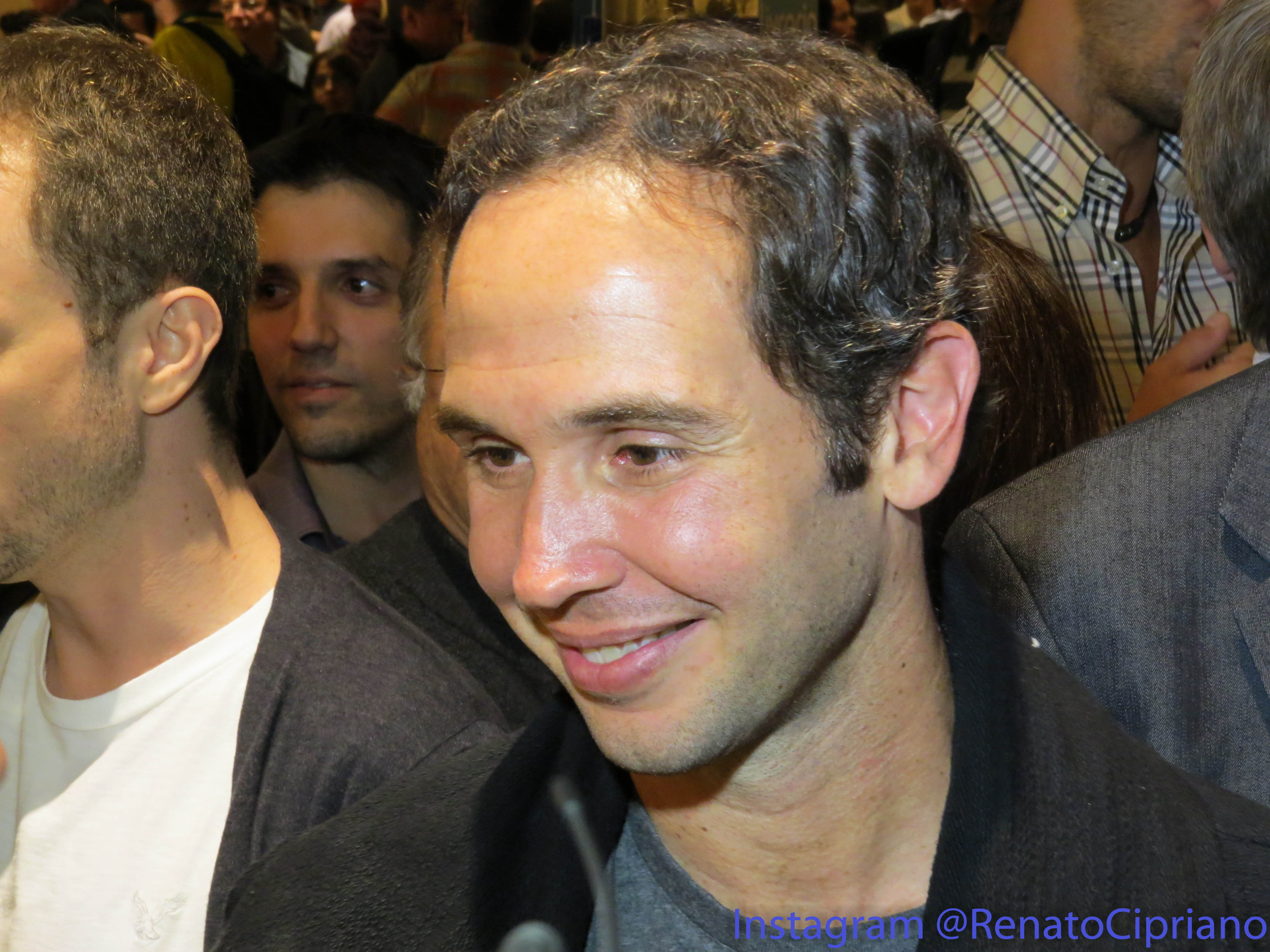

Personal information
- Full name: Caio Ribeiro Decousseau
- Date of birth: 16 August 1975 (age 51)
- Place of birth: São Paulo, Brazil
- Height: 1.77 m (5 ft 10 in)
- Position: Forward

Senior career*
| Years | Team | Apps | (Gls) |
| 1994–1995 | São Paulo | 31 | (14) |
| 1995–1996 | Inter Milan | 6 | (0) |
| 1996–1997 | Napoli | 20 | (0) |
| 1997 | Santos | 25 | (6) |
| 1998–1999 | Flamengo | 30 | (3) |
| 2000–2001 | Santos | 11 | (0) |
| 2001–2002 | Fluminense | 13 | (1) |
| 2002 | Flamengo | 7 | (0) |
| 2003 | Grêmio | 27 | (4) |
| 2003–2004 | Rot-Weiß Oberhausen | 15 | (1) |
| 2004–2005 | Botafogo | 42 | (10) |
| Total | | 227 | (39) |

International career
| 1995 | Brazil U20 | | |
| 1996 | Brazil | 4 | (3) |
- * Club domestic league appearances and goals

Caio Ribeiro Decoussau (born 16 August 1975) is a Brazilian football pundit and retired footballer who played as a forward.

== Club career ==
Born in São Paulo, Caio Ribeiro played for São Paulo, Inter Milan, Napoli, Santos, Flamengo, Fluminense, Grêmio, Rot-Weiß Oberhausen and Botafogo. When he moved from São Paulo to Inter Milan in 1995 at the age of 19, it was a record transfer for a teenager at £6.6 million.

== International career ==
Caio Ribeiro participated at the 1995 FIFA World Youth Championship, winning the Golden Ball award.

Caio Ribeiro scored 3 goals in 4 games for the Brazil senior team in 1996.

== Later career ==
After retiring from football Caio Ribeiro studied sports management, and became a commentator for Rede Globo in 2007. Alongside his Globo coworker Gustavo Villani, they are the official Brazilian Portuguese commentators of FIFA series (now EA Sports FC) since FIFA 21; previously, Ribeiro had been partnered with Tiago Leifert from FIFA 13 to FIFA 20.

== Career statistics ==
=== International ===
Appearances and goals by national team and year
| National team | Year | Apps | Goals |
|---|---|---|---|
| Brazil | 1996 | 4 | 3 |
| Total | | 4 | 3 |

Scores and results list Brazil's goal tally first, score column indicates score after each Ribeiro goal.

List of international goals scored by Caio Ribeiro
| No. | Date | Venue | Opponent | Score | Result | Competition | Ref. |
|---|---|---|---|---|---|---|---|
| 1 | 12 January 1996 | Los Angeles Memorial Coliseum, Los Angeles, United States | Canada | 2–0 | 4–1 | 1996 CONCACAF Gold Cup | |
| 2 | 14 January 1996 | Los Angeles Memorial Coliseum, Los Angeles, United States | Honduras | 1–0 | 5–0 | 1996 CONCACAF Gold Cup | |
| 3 | 14 January 1996 | Los Angeles Memorial Coliseum, Los Angeles, United States | Honduras | 5–0 | 5–0 | 1996 CONCACAF Gold Cup | |
