= Emerson (footballer, born August 1973) =

Brazilian footballer

Personal information
- Full name: Emerson Pereira da Silva
- Date of birth: 21 August 1973 (age 53)
- Place of birth: São Paulo, Brazil
- Position: Midfielder

Senior career*
Years	Team	Apps	(Gls)
1993–1995	São Paulo	10	(0)
1995–1999	Colo-Colo	86	(6)
1999	Perugia	2	(0)
2000–2001	Corinthians	26	(1)
2001	Botafogo (SP)	8	(0)
2002	Juventude	8	(0)
2003	Rentistas		
2003	Unión Española	15	(0)
2004	Monterrey	9	(0)
2004	Unión Española	13	(1)
2006	Unión Española	9	(0)

International career
1993	Brazil U20		

Managerial career
- 2013–2014: Jacuipense
- 2014: São Paulo (youth)
- 2015–2016: Liverpool (youth)
- 2017–2018: Shandong Luneng (youth)
- 2017–2018: Desportivo Brasil (youth)
- 2019: Corinthians (youth)
- 2020–2021: Chiangrai United (interim)
- 2021–2022: Chiangrai United
- 2022–2023: Nongbua Pitchaya
- 2024: Buriram United (caretaker)
- 2024–2025: Thailand U20
- 2025: Buriram United (caretaker)
- 2026: Buriram United (caretaker)
- * Club domestic league appearances and goals

Emerson Pereira da Silva (born 21 August 1973) is a Brazilian football manager and former footballer who played as a midfielder.

== Club career ==
In October 1998 he was signed by Italian club A.C. Perugia.

== International career ==
He played for the Brazil U20 side in the 1993 FIFA World Youth Championship.

== Managerial statistics ==
As of 7 September 2026

Managerial record by team and tenure
Team	Nat.	From	To	Record					Ref.
Team	Nat.	From	To	G	W	D	L	Win %	Ref.
Chiangrai United	(Thailand)	3 November 2020	7 December 2022	88	40	22	26	45.45	
Nongbua Pitchaya	(Thailand)	8 December 2022	23 February 2023	6	0	2	4	0.00	
Buriram United (caretaker)	(Thailand)	22 May 2024	26 May 2024	2	1	0	1	50.00	
Thailand U20	(Thailand)	6 June 2024	20 February 2025	13	6	2	5	46.15	
Buriram United (caretaker)	(Thailand)	5 September 2026	7 September 2026	1	1	0	0	100.00	
Career Total				110	48	26	36	43.64	

== Honours ==
=== Playing honour ===
- FIFA U-20 World Cup: 1993 (Champions)

=== Coaching honour ===
Chiangrai United

- Thai FA Cup: 2020–21
