= Tupãzinho (footballer, born 1968) =

Brazilian footballer

Personal information
- Full name: Pedro Francisco Garcia
- Date of birth: July 7, 1968 (age 58)
- Place of birth: Uchoa, SP, Brazil
- Position: Midfielder

Senior career*
Years	Team	Apps	(Gls)
1987–1989	São Bento		
1990–1996	Corinthians	340	(52)
1996	Fluminense		
1997–1999	América-MG		
- Matonense
- XV de Piracicaba
- Jaboticabal
- União de Rondonópolis (MT)
- Cene (MS)
- Ituiutaba (MG)
- * Club domestic league appearances and goals

Pedro Francisco Garcia, best known as Tupãzinho (born in Uchoa, July 7, 1968 was a Brazilian footballer, nicknamed by fans Talismã da Fiel (Fiel's Talisman).

He was the player who scored the goal that gave the first Brazilian Championship title for Sport Club Corinthians Paulista at 1990.

== Honours ==
- 1990 : Brazilian Championship
- 1995 : Copa do Brasil
- 1995 : Campeonato Paulista
- 1997 : Campeonato Brasileiro Série B
