= 1995 Copa do Brasil =

Copa do Brasil 1995

Tournament details
- Country: Brazil
- Dates: February 14 – June 21
- Teams: 36

Final positions
- Champions: Corinthians (SP)
- Runners-up: Grêmio (RS)

Tournament statistics
- Matches played: 69
- Goals scored: 166 (2.41 per match)
- Top goal scorer: Sávio (7)

The Copa do Brasil 1995 is the 7th staging of the Copa do Brasil.

The competition started on February 14, 1995, and concluded on June 21, 1995, with the second leg of the final, held at the Olímpico in Porto Alegre, in which Corinthians lifted the trophy for the first time after defeating Grêmio 1–0.

== Preliminary round ==
Team 1	Agg.	Team 2	1st leg	2nd leg
Sergipe-SE	1-4	São Paulo-SP	1-1	0-3
Sousa-PB	0-2	Flamengo-RJ	0-1	0-1
Juventude-RS	8-0	Figueirense-SC	5-0	3-0
Democrata-GV-MG	2-1	Goiás-GO	2-0	0-1

== Knockout round ==
First Round
Náutico-PE	1
São Paulo-SP	4
Remo-PA	1	3
Ferroviário-CE	1	1
Desportiva-ES	0	1
Grêmio-RS	1	2
ABC-RN	1	0
Palmeiras-SP	2	1
Gama-DF	1	0
Flamengo-RJ	2	3
Maranhão-MA	0	0
Kaburé-TO	0	2
CSA-AL	1	0
Cruzeiro-MG	2	4
Volta Redonda-RJ (p)	0	0 (6)
Bahia-BA	0	0 (7)

Round of 16
São Paulo-SP	3	1
Remo-PA	0	1
Grêmio-RS (a)	1	2
Palmeiras-SP	1	2
Flamengo-RJ	1	8
Kaburé-TO	0	0
Cruzeiro-MG (a)	1	1
Bahia-BA	0	2

Quarterfinals
São Paulo-SP	1	0
Grêmio-RS	1	2
Flamengo-RJ	1	1
Cruzeiro-MG	0	1

Semifinals
Grêmio-RS
Flamengo-RJ

First Round
Paraná-PR	1	1
Juventude-RS	0	0
Pontaporanense-MT	0	0
Internacional-RS	2	5
Operário-MT	1	0
Corinthians-SP	1	4
Rio Branco-AC	2	2
Palmares-RO	0	2
Democrata-GV-MG	3	0
Vitória-BA	2	2
Atlético Mineiro	1	2
Sport-PE	0	2
Flamengo-PI	1	1
Vasco da Gama-RJ	2	4
Cristal-AP	1	0
Nacional-AM	1	1

Round of 16
Paraná-PR	1	1
Internacional-RS	0	0
Corinthians-SP	3	2
Rio Branco-AC	0	0
Vitória-BA	2	1
Atlético Mineiro	3	1
Vasco da Gama-RJ	2	4
Nacional-AM	0	1

Quarterfinals
Paraná-PR	0	1
Corinthians-SP	0	2
Atlético Mineiro	0	1 (1)
Vasco da Gama-RJ (p)	1	0 (4)

Semifinals
Corinthians-SP
Vasco da Gama-RJ

== Semifinals ==
Team 1	Agg.	Team 2	1st leg	2nd leg
Grêmio-RS (a)	2-2	Flamengo-RJ	1-2	1-0
Corinthians-SP	6-0	Vasco da Gama-RJ	1-0	5-0

== Finals ==
Team 1	Agg.	Team 2	1st leg	2nd leg
Grêmio-RS	1-3	Corinthians-SP	1-2	0-1

== Champion ==
Copa do Brasil 1995

First title
