= Niquinha =

Brazilian footballer (born 1971)

Personal information
- Full name: Edson Pereira de Barros
- Date of birth: 30 September 1971 (age 55)
- Place of birth: Belo Horizonte, Brazil
- Height: 1.72 m (5 ft 8 in)
- Position: Midfielder

Senior career*
Years	Team	Apps	(Gls)
1992–1995	Náutico	44	(5)
1996	Sport	0	(0)
1997	Manchete		
1997–2009	Rio Ave	340	(18)
2009–2010	Francana		
- * Club domestic league appearances and goals

Edson Pereira de Barros (born 30 September 1971), known as Niquinha, is a Brazilian retired footballer who played as a midfielder.

== Club career ==
Born in Belo Horizonte, Minas Gerais, Niquinha started his professional career in Brazil with Clube Náutico Capibaribe and Manchete Futebol Clube, with a spell in between with Sport Club do Recife in which he collected no Série A appearances. He moved to Portugal in 1997, joining Rio Ave F.C. where he went on to become one of its most influential players, with nearly 400 competitive games for the Vila do Conde club.

After still contributing regularly in the 2008–09 season – 22 matches, 16 starts – as Rio Ave eventually retained their Primeira Liga status, Niquinha returned home aged 38, joining amateurs Associação Atlética Francana.
