= 1992 São Paulo FC season =

São Paulo
1992 season
- Chairman: José Eduardo Mesquita Pimenta
- Manager: Telê Santana
- Campeonato Brasileiro: 6th
- Intercontinental Cup: Champions (1st title)
- Copa Libertadores: Champions (1st title) (in 1993 Copa Libertadores, 1992 Supercopa Libertadores, 1993 Recopa Sudamericana and 1993 Copa de Oro)
- Campeonato Paulista: Champions (18th title) (in 1993 Copa do Brasil)
- Supercopa Libertadores: Quarterfinals
- Top goalscorer: League: Müller, Palhinha and Raí (5); All: Raí (31)
Home colours	Away colours

The 1992 season was São Paulo's 63rd season since club's existence.

== Statistics ==
=== Scorers ===
Position	Nation	Playing position	Name	Campeonato Brasileiro	Copa Libertadores	Campeonato Paulista	Supercopa Sudamericana	Intercontinental Cup	Others	Total
1	(Brazil)	MF	Raí	5	3	15	1	2	5	31
2	(Brazil)	FW	Palhinha	5	7	9	2	0	2	25
3	(Brazil)	FW	Müller	5	2	12	1	0	4	24
4	(Brazil)	DF	Ivan	1	0	5	0	0	0	6
=	(Brazil)	FW	Macedo	4	2	0	0	0	0	6
5	(Brazil)	DF	Cafu	1	0	4	0	0	0	5
6	(Brazil)	DF	Antônio Carlos	2	2	0	0	0	0	4
=	(Brazil)	MF	Dinho	0	0	3	1	0	0	4
=	(Brazil)	MF	Elivélton	0	2	1	0	0	1	4
7	(Brazil)	FW	Cuca	0	0	3	0	0	0	3
=	(Brazil)	FW	Maurício	0	0	2	0	0	1	3
=	(Brazil)	DF	Ronaldão	1	1	1	0	0	0	3
=	(Brazil)	MF	Toninho Cerezo	0	0	3	0	0	0	3
=	(Brazil)	DF	Válber	0	0	2	1	0	0	3
8	(Brazil)	FW	Catê	0	0	2	0	0	0	2
=	(Brazil)	FW	Rinaldo	1	1	0	0	0	0	2
9	(Brazil)	DF	Ronaldo Luiz	1	0	0	0	0	0	1
=	(Brazil)	DF	Vítor	0	0	1	0	0	0	1
			Own goals	2	0	0	0	0	1	3
			Total	28	20	63	6	2	14	133

=== Managers performance ===
Name	Nationality	From	To	P	W	D	L	GF	GA	%
Telê Santana	Brazil	29 January	20 December	84	45	21	18	133	73	66%

=== Overall ===
Games played	84 (25 Campeonato Brasileiro, 14 Copa Libertadores, 34 Campeonato Paulista, 4 Supercopa Sudamericana, 1 Intercontinental Cup, 6 Friendly match)
Games won	45 (10 Campeonato Brasileiro, 8 Copa Libertadores, 21 Campeonato Paulista, 1 Supercopa Sudamericana, 1 Intercontinental Cup, 4 Friendly match)
Games drawn	21 (7 Campeonato Brasileiro, 3 Copa Libertadores, 9 Campeonato Paulista, 1 Supercopa Sudamericana, 0 Intercontinental Cup, 1 Friendly match)
Games lost	18 (8 Campeonato Brasileiro, 3 Copa Libertadores, 4 Campeonato Paulista, 2 Supercopa Sudamericana, 0 Intercontinental Cup, 1 Friendly match)
Goals scored	133
Goals conceded	73
Goal difference	+60
Best result	6–0 (H) v Noroeste - Campeonato Paulista - 1992.10.15
Worst result	0–4 (H) v Palmeiras - Campeonato Brasileiro - 1992.03.08
Top scorer	Raí (31)

Source: São Paulo FC

== Friendlies ==
=== Trofeo Teresa Herrera ===
August 14 International	Peñarol (Uruguay)	2–2 (4–5 p)	(Brazil) São Paulo	A Coruña
	Aguirre 27'; Martínez 76'		Palhinha 46'; Raí 59'	Stadium: Estadio Riazor

August 15 International	Barcelona (Spain)	1–4	(Brazil) São Paulo	A Coruña
	Salinas 3'		Müller 9'; Maurício 47'; Raí 60', 63'	Stadium: Estadio Riazor

=== Trofeo Ramón de Carranza ===
August 28 International	Cádiz (Spain)	0–2	(Brazil) São Paulo	Cádiz
			Palhinha 34'; Raí 70'	Stadium: Estadio Ramón de Carranza

August 29 International	Real Madrid (Spain)	0–4	(Brazil) São Paulo	Cádiz
			Elivélton 7'; Raí 48'; Müller 49', 58'	Stadium: Estadio Ramón de Carranza

=== Trofeo Ciudad de Barcelona ===
September 1 International	Espanyol (Spain)	1–2	(Brazil) São Paulo	Barcelona
	Escaich 16'		Mino 42' (o.g.); Müller 85'	Stadium: Estadio Sarriá

=== Trofeo Villa de Madrid ===
September 3 International	Atlético Madrid (Spain)	2–0	(Brazil) São Paulo	Madrid
	Luis García 23'; Futre 55'			Stadium: Estadio Vicente Calderón

== Official competitions ==
=== Campeonato Brasileiro ===
==== League table ====
Pos	Team	Pld	W	D	L	GF	GA	GD	Pts	Qualification
4	Flamengo	19	8	6	5	32	24	+8	22	Qualified to Group 1
5	Corinthians	19	8	6	5	24	22	+2	22	Qualified to Group 2
6	São Paulo	19	8	5	6	22	16	+6	21	Qualified to Group 1
7	Cruzeiro	19	7	7	5	10	14	−4	21	Qualified to Group 2
8	Santos	19	7	7	5	23	18	+5	21	Qualified to Group 1

==== Matches ====
29 January 1992 1	Santos	1–1	São Paulo	Santos
	Paulinho McLaren 55'		16' (o.g.) Castro	Stadium: Vila Belmiro; Attendance: 18,017; Referee: José Aparecido de Oliveira

February 2 2	Bragantino	0–0	São Paulo	Bragança Paulista
				Stadium: Marcelo Stéfani; Attendance: 6,823; Referee: Oscar Roberto de Godói

February 9 First stage 3	São Paulo	2–1	Bahia	São Paulo
	Müller 8'; Raí 89'		Marcelo Ramos 46'	Stadium: Pacaembu; Attendance: 9,433; Referee: Dalmo Bozzano

February 15 First stage 4	São Paulo	2–0	Atlético Mineiro	São Paulo
	Ronaldo Luiz 52'; Raí 53'			Stadium: Canindé; Attendance: 8,925; Referee: Léo Feldman

February 19 First stage 5	Flamengo	3–2	São Paulo	Rio de Janeiro
	Gaúcho 31', 84'; Rogério Lourenço 72'		Palhinha 64'; Wilson Gottardo 86' (o.g.)	Stadium: Maracanã; Attendance: 35,450; Referee: Renato Marsiglia

February 23 First stage 6	São Paulo	0–1	Guarani	São Paulo
			Aílton 84'	Stadium: Pacaembu; Attendance: 8,429; Referee: Flávio de Carvalho

March 8 First stage 7	São Paulo	0–4	Palmeiras	São Paulo
			Evair 23', 57'; Andrei 27'; Edu Marangon 34'	Stadium: Morumbi; Attendance: 20,947; Referee: Oscar Roberto de Godói

March 11 First stage 8	Internacional	1–0	São Paulo	Porto Alegre
	Simão 12'			Stadium: Beira-Rio; Attendance: 24,263; Referee: Márcio Rezende de Freitas

March 23 First stage 9	São Paulo	5–0	Atlético Paranaense	São Paulo
	Ronaldão 1'; Cafu 18'; Müller 34'; Palhinha 48'; Antônio Carlos 61'			Stadium: Morumbi; Attendance: 3,027; Referee: Válter Senra

March 25 First stage 10	São Paulo	0–0	Corinthians	São Paulo
				Stadium: Morumbi; Attendance: 23,510; Referee: Oscar Roberto de Godói

March 29 First stage 11	Sport	0–0	São Paulo	Recife
				Stadium: Ilha do Retiro; Attendance: 23,738; Referee: Cláudio Vinícius Cerdeira

April 4 First stage 12	Cruzeiro	0–2	São Paulo	Belo Horizonte
			Raí 56'; Müller 61'	Stadium: Mineirão; Attendance: 26,453; Referee: José Mocellin

April 11 First stage 13	São Paulo	1–0	Fluminense	São Paulo
	Macedo 51'			Stadium: Morumbi; Attendance: 15,665; Referee: Márcio Rezende de Freitas

April 18 First stage 14	São Paulo	0–1	Portuguesa	São Paulo
			Adil 39'	Stadium: Morumbi; Attendance: 13,244; Referee: Ulisses Tavares da Silva Filho

April 25 First stage 15	Goiás	1–1	São Paulo	Goiânia
	Wallace 34'		Rinaldo 12'	Stadium: Serra Dourada; Attendance: 10,608; Referee: Márcio Rezende de Freitas

May 3 First stage 16	São Paulo	1–0	Vasco da Gama	São Paulo
	Antônio Carlos 53'			Stadium: Morumbi; Attendance: 15,044; Referee: José Roberto Ramiz Wright

May 10 First stage 17	São Paulo	3–0	Botafogo	São Paulo
	Palhinha 33'; Macedo 39', 54'			Stadium: Morumbi; Attendance: 32,873; Referee: José Mocellin

May 23 First stage 18	Paysandu	3–0	São Paulo	Belém
	Dema 37'; Vladimir 69'; Reginaldo 89'			Stadium: Estádio do Morumbi; Attendance: 8,548; Referee: Wilson Carlos dos Santos

May 31 First stage 19	São Paulo	2–0	Náutico	São Paulo
	Palhinha 39'; Raí 87'			Stadium: Estádio do Morumbi; Attendance: 31,444; Referee: Dalmo Bozzano

==== Second stage ====
Group 1
Pos	Team	Pld	W	D	L	GF	GA	GD	Pts	Qualification
1	Flamengo	6	3	1	2	7	5	+2	7	Finalist
2	Vasco	6	1	4	1	10	9	+1	6	
3	São Paulo	6	2	2	2	6	7	−1	6	
4	Santos	6	1	3	2	7	9	−2	5	

===== Matches =====
June 14 Second stage 1	Flamengo	1–0	São Paulo	Rio de Janeiro
	Rogério Lourenço 16'			Stadium: Maracanã; Attendance: 48,652; Referee: José Mocellin

June 21 Second stage 2	São Paulo	2–2	Vasco da Gama	São Paulo
	Müller 13', 20'		Edmundo 35'; Bebeto 75'	Stadium: Estádio do Morumbi; Attendance: 25,333; Referee: José Roberto Ramiz Wright

June 27 Second stage 3	Santos	1–1	São Paulo	São Paulo
	Almir 90'		Iván Rocha 5'	Stadium: Pacaembu; Attendance: 33,042; Referee: Ulisses Tavares da Silva Filho

July 1 Second stage 4	São Paulo	1–0	Santos	São Paulo
	Macedo 9'			Stadium: Estádio do Morumbi; Attendance: 35,691; Referee: Renato Marsiglia

July 4 Second stage 5	São Paulo	2–0	Flamengo	São Paulo
	Raí 51'; Palhinha 70'			Stadium: Estádio do Morumbi; Attendance: 42,597; Referee: José Roberto Ramiz Wright

July 8 Second stage 6	Vasco da Gama	3–0	São Paulo	Rio de Janeiro
	Bebeto 10'; Bismarck 46'; Edmundo 69'			Stadium: São Januário; Attendance: 4,586; Referee: José Roberto Ramiz Wright

==== Record ====
Final Position	Points	Matches	Wins	Draws	Losses	Goals For	Goals Away	Win%
5th	27	25	10	7	8	28	23	54%

=== Copa Libertadores ===
==== First stage ====
Team	Pts	Pld	W	D	L	GF	GA	GD
(Brazil) Criciúma	9	6	4	1	1	13	7	6
(Brazil) São Paulo	8	6	3	2	1	11	5	6
(Bolivia) Bolívar	6	6	2	2	2	9	9	0
(Bolivia) San José	1	6	0	1	5	5	17	-12

6 March 1992 1	Criciúma (Brazil)	3–0	(Brazil) São Paulo	Criciúma
	Jairo Lenzi 42'; Gélson 50' (pen.); Adílson 89'			Stadium: Estádio Heriberto Hulse; Attendance: 20,000; Referee: Renato Marsiglia

March 17 Group 2	San Jose (Bolivia)	0–3	(Brazil) São Paulo	Oruro
			Palhinha 28', 67', 72'	Stadium: Estadio Jesús Bermúdez; Attendance: 30,000; Referee: Milton Vicencio

March 20 Group 2	Bolívar (Bolivia)	1–1	(Brazil) São Paulo	La Paz
	Hirano 15'		Raí 83'	Stadium: Estadio Hernando Siles; Attendance: 39,000; Referee: Jorge Orellana

April 1 Group 2	São Paulo (Brazil)	4–0	(Brazil) Criciúma	São Paulo
	Raí 33'; Palhinha 44'; Elivélton 70'; Müller 77'			Stadium: Estádio do Morumbi; Attendance: 30,000; Referee: Cláudio Vinícius Cerdeira

April 7 Group 2	São Paulo (Brazil)	1–1	(Bolivia) San Jose	São Paulo
	Palhinha 34'		Antelo 83'	Stadium: Estádio do Morumbi; Attendance: 2,000; Referee: Efigenio Verdum

April 14 Group 2	São Paulo (Brazil)	2–0	(Bolivia) Bolívar	São Paulo
	Antônio Carlos 23'; Macedo 59'			Stadium: Estádio do Morumbi; Attendance: 5,000; Referee: Francisco Lamolina

==== Eightfinals ====
April 28 Round of 16	Nacional (Uruguay)	0–1	(Brazil) São Paulo	Montevideo
			Elivélton 18'	Stadium: Estadio Centenario; Attendance: 22,000; Referee: Enrique Marin

May 6 Round of 16	São Paulo (Brazil)	2–0 (3–0 agg.)	(Uruguay) Nacional	São Paulo
	Ronaldão 4'; Antônio Carlos 52'			Stadium: Estádio do Morumbi; Attendance: 20,000; Referee: Francisco Escobar

==== Quarterfinals ====
May 13 Quarterfinals	São Paulo (Brazil)	1–0	(Brazil) Criciúma	São Paulo
	Macedo 82'			Stadium: Estádio do Morumbi; Attendance: 17,000; Referee: Renato Marsiglia

May 20 Quarterfinals	Criciúma (Brazil)	1–1 (1–2 agg.)	(Brazil) São Paulo	Criciúma
	Soares 9'		Palhinha 53'	Stadium: Estádio Heriberto Hulse; Attendance: 21,050; Referee: Márcio Rezende de Freitas

==== Semifinals ====
May 27 Semifinals	São Paulo (Brazil)	3–0	(Ecuador) Barcelona	São Paulo
	Müller 5'; Palhinha 11'; Rinaldo 44'			Stadium: Estádio do Morumbi; Referee: Francisco Lamolina

June 3 Semifinals	Barcelona (Ecuador)	2–0 (2–3 agg.)	(Brazil) São Paulo	Guayaquil
	Gavica 51'; Gílson 87'			Stadium: Estadio Isidro Romero; Attendance: 25,000; Referee: Ernesto Filipi

==== Finals ====
June 10 Finals	Newell's Old Boys (Argentina)	1–0	(Brazil) São Paulo	Rosario
	Berizzo 39' (pen.)			Stadium: Estadio Gigante de Arroyito; Attendance: 35,000; Referee: Hernán Silva (CHI)

June 17 Finals	São Paulo (Brazil)	1–0 (1–1 agg.) (3–2 p)	(Argentina) Newell's Old Boys	São Paulo
	Raí 65' (pen.)			Stadium: Estádio do Morumbi; Attendance: 105,185; Referee: José Torres Cadena (COL)
	Penalties
	Raí (penalty scored); Ivan (penalty scored); Ronaldão (penalty missed); Cafú (penalty scored)		(penalty missed) Berizzo; (penalty scored) Zamora; (penalty scored) Llop; (penalty missed) Mendoza; (penalty missed) Gamboa

==== Record ====
Final Position	Points	Matches	Wins	Draws	Losses	Goals For	Goals Away	Win%
1st	19	14	8	3	3	20	9	67%

=== Campeonato Paulista ===
==== League table ====
Pos	Team	Pld	W	D	L	GF	GA	GD	Pts	Qualification or relegation
1	São Paulo	26	14	8	4	43	22	+21	36	Qualified
2	Palmeiras	26	12	9	5	30	16	+14	33	Qualified
3	Corinthians	26	12	8	6	32	20	+12	32	Qualified
4	Santos	26	10	12	4	39	23	+16	32	Qualified
5	Portuguesa	26	10	11	5	34	20	+14	31	Qualified

Updated to match(es) played on 1 November 1992. Source: RSSSF.com
Rules for classification: 1) points; 2) wins; 3) goal difference; 4) number of goals scored.

===== Matches =====
July 12 Round 1	Juventus	1–1	São Paulo	São Paulo
	Ricardo Eugênio 6'		Palhinha 14'	Stadium: Pacaembu; Attendance: 1,591; Referee: João Paulo Araújo

July 21 Round 2	São Paulo	3–3	Ituano	São Paulo
	Raí 10'; Palhinha 13'; Müller 85'		Paulo César Cruvinel 19'; Vânder 53'; Juninho 84'	Stadium: Estádio do Morumbi; Attendance: 3,094; Referee: Dionísio Roberto Domingos

July 26 Round 3	Noroeste	0–1	São Paulo	Bauru
			Müller 80'	Stadium: Estádio Alfredo de Castilho; Attendance: 9,022; Referee: Silas Santana

July 30 Round 4	Botafogo	1–1	São Paulo	Ribeirão Preto
	Bira 20'		Müller 83'	Stadium: Estádio Santa Cruz; Attendance: 6,273; Referee: Edmundo Lima Filho

August 2 Round 5	São Paulo	1–1	Bragantino	São Paulo
	Dinho 44'		Ronaldo Alfredo 81'	Stadium: Estádio do Morumbi; Attendance: 1,406; Referee: Paulo Eduardo Pereira Barjas

August 6 Round 6	Internacional	0–1	São Paulo	Limeira
			Cuca 86'	Stadium: Estádio Levy Sobrinho; Attendance: 5,730; Referee: Dagoberto Teixeira

August 9 Round 7	São Paulo	1–0	Palmeiras	São Paulo
	Dinho 9'			Stadium: Estádio do Morumbi; Attendance: 11,867; Referee: Edmundo Lima Filho

August 20 Round 8	Guarani	0–0	São Paulo	Campinas
				Stadium: Estádio Brinco de Ouro; Attendance: 8,328; Referee: João Paulo Araújo

August 23 Round 9	São Paulo	2–1	Portuguesa	São Paulo
	Ronaldão 50'; Palhinha 87'		Bentinho 31'	Stadium: Estádio do Morumbi; Attendance: 7,553; Referee: Oscar Roberto de Godói

September 5 Round 10	Santos	3–2	São Paulo	Santos
	Guga 3'; Ronaldão 27' (o.g.); Adilson 70' (o.g.)		Palhinha 83'; Iván Rocha 87'	Stadium: Estádio Vila Belmiro; Attendance: 13,947; Referee: José Roberto Ramiz Wright

September 8 Round 11	São Paulo	5–2	Santo André	São Paulo
	Maurício 28'; Iván Rocha 39', 41', 62'; Müller 87'		Reginaldo 31'; Lima 84'	Stadium: Estádio do Morumbi; Attendance: 2,223; Referee: João Paulo Araújo

September 10 Round 12	São Paulo	1–0	Sãocarlense	São Paulo
	Müller 70'			Stadium: Estádio do Morumbi; Attendance: 3,216; Referee: Sergio Correia da Silva

September 13 Round 13	Corinthians	0–1	São Paulo	São Paulo
			Palhinha 44'	Stadium: Estádio do Morumbi; Attendance: 74,671; Referee: Silas Santana

September 20 Round 14	São Paulo	0–0	Santos	São Paulo
				Stadium: Estádio do Morumbi; Attendance: 37,928; Referee: Dionísio Roberto Domingos

September 24 Round 15	São Paulo	1–0	Botafogo	São Paulo
	Maurício 23'			Stadium: Estádio do Morumbi; Attendance: 4,207; Referee: Joaquim Carlos Caetano

September 27 Round 16	Santo André	1–1	São Paulo	Santo André
	Rizza 33'		Dinho 10'	Stadium: Estádio Bruno José Daniel; Attendance: 13,184; Referee: Dagoberto Teixeira

October 2 Round 17	São Paulo	3–0	Internacional	São Paulo
	Müller 12', 30'; Raí 38'			Stadium: Estádio do Morumbi; Attendance: 3,333; Referee: Válter Francisco dos Santos

October 4 Round 18	São Paulo	3–0	Corinthians	São Paulo
	Müller 19'; Palhinha 34'; Iván Rocha 74'			Stadium: Estádio do Morumbi; Attendance: 44,146; Referee: Ulisses Tavares da Silva Filho

October 7 Round 19	Sãocarlense	0–2	São Paulo	São Carlos
			Raí 9'; Catê 66'	Stadium: Estádio Luís Augusto de Oliveira; Attendance: 13,764; Referee: Paulo Eduardo Pereira Barjas

October 11 Round 20	Portuguesa	2–2	São Paulo	São Paulo
	Dener 46', 85'		Müller 17'; Palhinha 74'	Stadium: Canindé; Attendance: 19,122; Referee: José Roberto Ramiz Wright

October 15 Round 21	São Paulo	6–0	Noroeste	São Paulo
	Raí 11', 24', 56', 73', 85'; Müller 80'			Stadium: Estádio do Morumbi; Attendance: 5,983; Referee: José Roberto Ramiz Wright

October 18 Round 22	Bragantino	1–0	São Paulo	Bragança Paulista
	Adílson 39' (o.g.)			Stadium: Estádio Marcelo Stéfani; Attendance: 8,899; Referee: Dagoberto Teixeira

October 22 Round 23	São Paulo	2–0	Juventus	São Paulo
	Válber 36'; Raí 52'			Stadium: Pacaembu; Attendance: 3,702; Referee: Dionísio Roberto Domingos

October 25 Round 24	São Paulo	2–1	Guarani	São Paulo
	Catê 17'; Palhinha 72'		Edílson 77'	Stadium: Pacaembu; Attendance: 12,766; Referee: Edmundo Lima Filho

October 29 Round 25	Ituano	2–1	São Paulo	Itu
	Celso 25'; Chiquinho 71'		Cuca 53'	Stadium: Estádio Novelli Júnior; Attendance: 4,743; Referee: Válter Francisco dos Santos

November 1 Round 26	Palmeiras	3–0	São Paulo	São Paulo
	César Sampaio 12'; Evair 26', 82'			Stadium: Morumbi; Attendance: 29,964; Referee: Dagoberto Teixeira

==== Second phase ====
Pos	Team	Pld	W	D	L	GF	GA	GD	Pts	Qualification or relegation
1	São Paulo	6	5	1	0	14	4	+10	11	Qualified
2	Portuguesa	6	3	1	2	8	8	0	7	
3	Ponte Preta	6	1	2	3	5	8	−3	4	
4	Santos	6	1	0	5	5	12	−7	2	

Updated to match(es) played on 29 November 1992. Source: RSSSF.com
Rules for classification: 1) points; 2) wins; 3) goal difference; 4) number of goals scored.

===== Matches =====
November 7 1	Portuguesa	0–2	São Paulo	São Paulo
			Cafu 17'; Toninho Cerezo 30'	Stadium: Pacaembu; Attendance: 30,876; Referee: Dionísio Domingos

November 11 2	Santos	0–3	São Paulo	São Paulo
			Palhinha 39'; Toninho Cerezo 59'; Vítor 83'	Stadium: Pacaembu; Attendance: 40,000; Referee: Oscar Roberto Godói

November 14 Round 3	São Paulo	4–2	Ponte Preta	São Paulo
	Raí 13', 42', 58'; Válber 85'		Jucemar 60', 74'	Stadium: Morumbi; Attendance: 32,776; Referee: João Paulo de Araújo

November 18 Round 4	São Paulo	2–1	Santos	São Paulo
	Cafu 6'; Müller 78'		Almir 80'	Stadium: Pacaembu; Attendance: 15,133; Referee: Flávio de Carvalho

November 21 Round 5	Ponte Preta	0–0	São Paulo	Campinas
				Stadium: Moisés Lucarelli; Attendance: 16,805; Referee: Dagoberto Teixeira

November 28 Round 6	São Paulo	3–1	Portuguesa	São Paulo
	Elivélton 32'; Cafu 72'; Cuca 80'		Capitão 24'	Stadium: Pacaembu; Attendance: 15,045; Referee: Antônio Sales

==== Finals ====
December 5 Final	Palmeiras	2–4	São Paulo	São Paulo
	Daniel Frasson 22'; Zinho 73'		Cafu 11'; Raí 35', 81', 90+3'	Stadium: Morumbi; Attendance: 90,688; Referee: Oscar Roberto Godói

December 20 Final	São Paulo	2–1 (6–3 agg.)	Palmeiras	São Paulo
	Müller 24'; Toninho Cerezo 60'		Zinho 90'	Stadium: Morumbi; Attendance: 110,887; Referee: José Aparecido de Oliveira

==== Record ====
Final Position	Points	Matches	Wins	Draws	Losses	Goals For	Goals Away	Win%
1st	51	34	21	9	4	63	29	75%

=== Supercopa Sudamericana ===
September 30 First round	Santos (Brazil)	1–1	(Brazil) São Paulo	São Paulo
	Guga 72'		Müller 78'	Stadium: Parque Antártica

October 13 First round	São Paulo (Brazil)	4–1 (5–2 agg.)	(Brazil) Santos	São Paulo
	Raí 9'; Palhinha 17'; Válber 68'; Dinho 84'		Guga 45'	Stadium: Estádio do Morumbi

October 20 Quarterfinals	São Paulo (Brazil)	1–2	(Paraguay) Olimpia	São Paulo
	Palhinha 41'		Amarilla 30'; Sanabria 54'	Stadium: Estádio do Morumbi

October 27 Quarterfinals	Olimpia (Paraguay)	1–0 (3–1 agg.)	(Brazil) São Paulo	Asunción
	Amarilla 2'			Stadium: Estadio Defensores del Chaco

==== Record ====
Final Position	Points	Matches	Wins	Draws	Losses	Goals For	Goals Away	Win%
7th	3	4	1	1	2	6	5	37%

=== Intercontinental Cup ===
December 13 Final	Barcelona (Spain)	1–2	(Brazil) São Paulo	Tokyo
12:00 (UTC+9)	Stoichkov 12'		Raí 27', 78'	Stadium: National Stadium; Attendance: 60,000; Referee: Juan Carlos Loustau (ARG)

==== Record ====
Final Position	Points	Matches	Wins	Draws	Losses	Goals For	Goals Away	Win%
1st	2	1	1	0	0	2	1	100%
