= 1992 Copa Libertadores finals =

- Event: 1992 Copa Libertadores
Newell's Old Boys	São Paulo
(Argentina)	(Brazil)
1	1
- São Paulo won the penalty shootout 3–2

First leg
Newell's Old Boys	São Paulo
1	0
- Date: 10 June 1992
- Venue: Gigante de Arroyito, Rosario
- Referee: Hernán Silva
- Attendance: 35,000

Second leg
São Paulo	Newell's Old Boys
1	0
- Date: 17 June 1992
- Venue: Estádio do Morumbi, São Paulo
- Referee: José Torres
- Attendance: 71,986 (105,185)

The 1992 Copa Libertadores final was a two-legged football match-up to determine the 1992 Copa Libertadores champion. The final was contested by Brazilian club São Paulo and Argentine side Newell's Old Boys. The first leg was held in Estadio Gigante de Arroyito (home venue of club Rosario Central) where Newell's beat Sao Paulo 1–0 in front of 35,000 spectators.

In the second leg, held in Estádio do Morumbi, Sao Paulo defeated Newell's 1–0. As both teams tied on points and goal difference, a penalty shootout was conducted to decide a champion. Sao Paulo won the series 3–2 on penalties, therefore the Brazilian team won their first Copa Libertadores trophy.

== Qualified teams ==
Team	Previous finals app.
(Argentina) Newell's Old Boys	1988
(Brazil) São Paulo	1974

- **Bold** indicates winning years

== Venues ==
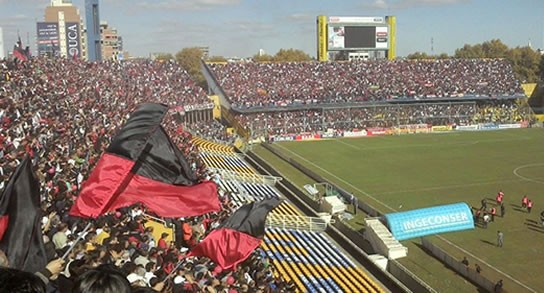
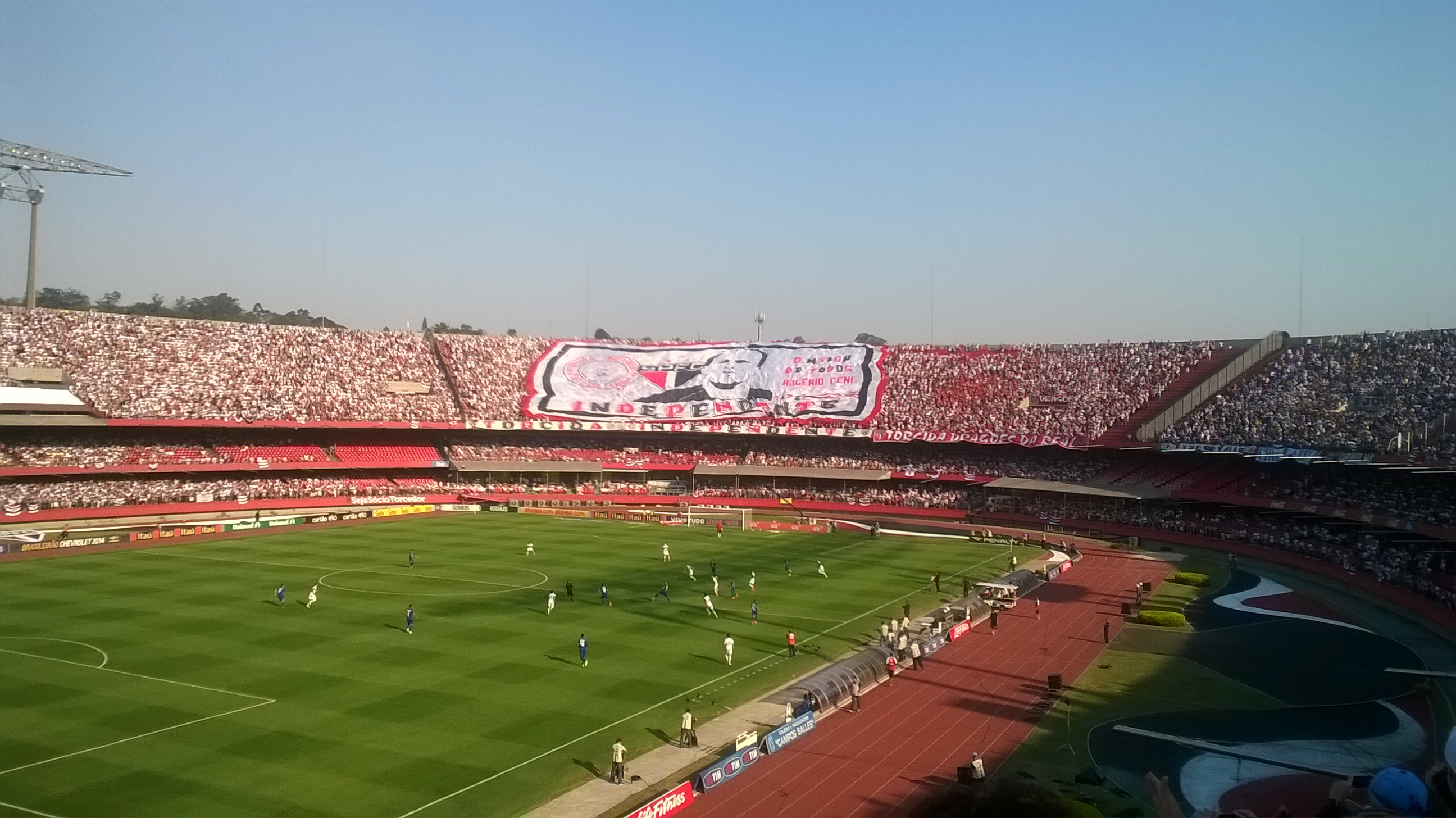
Estadio Gigante de Arroyito (left) and Estádio do Morumbi, venues for the finals

== Match details ==
=== First leg ===
10 June 1992
First leg

Newell's Old Boys (Argentina)	1–0	(Brazil) São Paulo
Berizzo 39' (pen.)

Estadio Gigante de Arroyito, Rosario
Attendance: 45,000
Referee: Hernán Silva (Chile)

**Newell's**	**São Paulo**

GK	1	(Argentina) Norberto Scoponi
RB	2	(Argentina) Fernando Gamboa	Booked
CB	3	(Argentina) Eduardo Berizzo
CB	19	(Argentina) Gustavo Raggio
LB	6	(Argentina) Mauricio Pochettino
DM	14	(Argentina) Alfredo Berti
RM	4	(Argentina) Julio Saldaña
LM	7	(Argentina) Julio Zamora
AM	8	(Argentina) Gerardo Martino (c)		(substituted off) 85'
CF	20	(Argentina) Ricardo Lunari
CF	22	(Paraguay) Alfredo Mendoza	Booked	(substituted off) 78'
Substitutes:
FW	9	(Argentina) Cristian Domizzi		(substituted on) 78'
FW	11	(Argentina) Aldo Soria
GK	12	(Argentina) Luis Romero
FW	13	(Argentina) Fabián Garfagnoli		(substituted on) 85'
DF	16	(Argentina) Miguel D'Agostino
Manager:
(Argentina) Marcelo Bielsa

GK	1	(Brazil) Zetti
RB	2	(Brazil) Cafu
CB	3	(Brazil) Antônio Carlos	Booked
CB	4	(Brazil) Ronaldão
LB	15	(Brazil) Iván
DM	13	(Brazil) Adílson
DM	14	(Brazil) Pintado
AM	10	(Brazil) Raí (c)
FW	7	(Brazil) Müller
FW	18	(Brazil) Palhinha		(substituted off) 62'
FW	11	(Brazil) Elivélton
Substitutes:
GK	12	(Brazil) Bonequini
MF	5	(Brazil) Sídnei
MF	8	(Brazil) Suélio
FW	9	(Brazil) Macedo		(substituted on) 62'
FW	23	(Brazil) Rinaldo
Manager:
(Brazil) Telê Santana

Assistant referees:
Gastón Castro (Chile)
Salvador Imperatore (Chile)
Fourth official:
Unknown

=== Second leg ===
17 June 1992
Second leg

São Paulo (Brazil)	1–0	(Argentina) Newell's Old Boys
Raí 65' (pen.)
Penalties
Raí (penalty scored); Iván (penalty scored); Ronaldão (penalty missed); Cafu (penalty scored)	3–2	(penalty missed) Berizzo; (penalty scored) Zamora; (penalty scored) Llop; (penalty missed) Mendoza; (penalty missed) Gamboa

Estádio do Morumbi, São Paulo
Attendance: 105,185
Referee: José Torres Cadena (Colombia)

**São Paulo**	**Newell's**

GK	1	(Brazil) Zetti
RB	2	(Brazil) Cafu
CB	3	(Brazil) Antônio Carlos	Booked
CB	4	(Brazil) Ronaldão
LB	15	(Brazil) Iván
DM	13	(Brazil) Adílson
DM	14	(Brazil) Pintado	Booked
AM	10	(Brazil) Raí (c)
FW	7	(Brazil) Müller		(substituted off) 65'
FW	18	(Brazil) Palhinha
FW	11	(Brazil) Elivélton	Booked
Substitutes:
GK	12	(Brazil) Bonequini
MF	5	(Brazil) Sídnei
MF	8	(Brazil) Suélio
FW	9	(Brazil) Macedo		(substituted on) 65'
FW	23	(Brazil) Rinaldo
Manager:
(Brazil) Telê Santana

GK	1	(Argentina) Norberto Scoponi
CB	2	(Argentina) Fernando Gamboa	Booked
CB	3	(Argentina) Eduardo Berizzo
CB	6	(Argentina) Mauricio Pochettino
RM	4	(Argentina) Julio Saldaña
CM	14	(Argentina) Alfredo Berti	Booked
CM	5	(Argentina) Juan Manuel Llop
LM	7	(Argentina) Julio Zamora	Booked
AM	8	(Argentina) Gerardo Martino (c)		(substituted off) 46'
CF	20	(Argentina) Ricardo Lunari	Booked
CF	22	(Paraguay) Alfredo Mendoza
Substitutes:
FW	9	(Argentina) Cristian Domizzi		(substituted on) 46'
Manager:
(Argentina) Marcelo Bielsa

Assistant referees:
John Toro Rendón (Colombia)
Jorge Eliezer Zuluaga (Colombia)
Fourth official:
Ulisses Tavares da Silva (Brazil)
