= 1993 Copa Libertadores finals =

- Event: Copa Libertadores
| São Paulo | Universidad Católica |
| (Brazil) | (Chile) |
| 5 | 3 |

First leg
| São Paulo | Universidad Católica |
| 5 | 1 |
- Date: 19 May 1993
- Venue: Estádio do Morumbi, São Paulo
- Referee: José Torres Cadena (Colombia)
- Attendance: 99,000

Second leg
| Universidad Católica | São Paulo |
| 2 | 0 |
- Date: 26 May 1993
- Venue: Estadio Nacional, Santiago
- Referee: Juan Francisco Escobar (Paraguay)
- Attendance: 50,000

The 1993 Copa Libertadores final was a two-legged football match-up to determine the 1993 Copa Libertadores champion. The finals were a match up of Brazilian club São Paulo and Universidad Católica from Chile.

The 1993 final was São Paulo's third appearance in the final, and second consecutive final. Universidad Católica was playing in their first Libertadores final. São Paulo won the title 5–3 on aggregate.

== Qualified teams ==
| Team | Previous finals app. |
|---|---|
| (Brazil) São Paulo | 1974, **1992** |
| (Chile) Universidad Católica | None |

Bold indicates winning years

== Venues ==
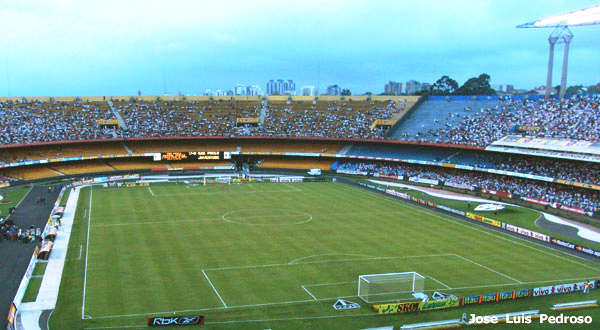
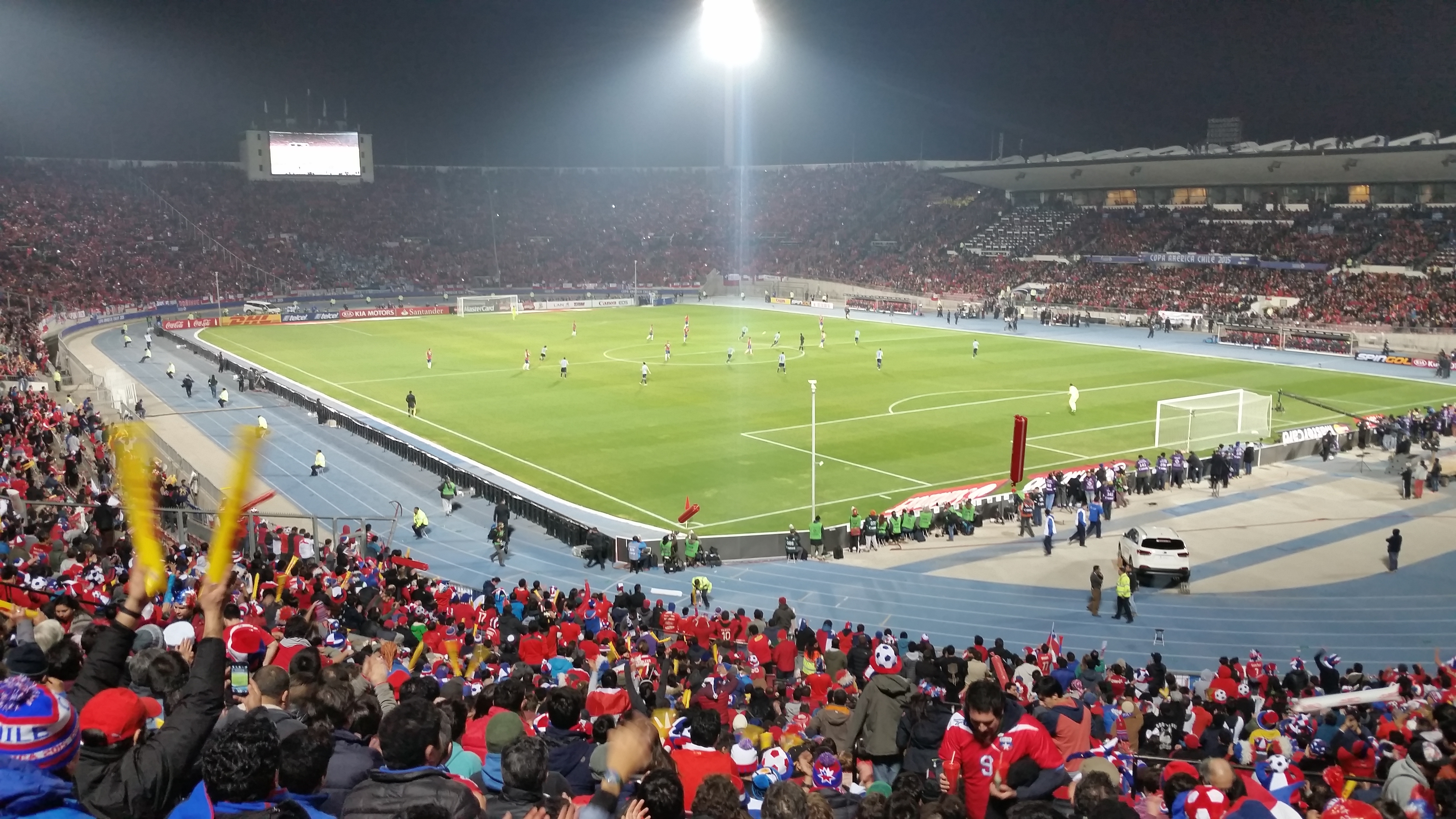
Estadio do Morumbi (left) and Estadio nacional, venues for the series

== Match details ==
=== First leg ===
19 May 1993
First leg

| São Paulo (Brazil) | 5–1 | (Chile) Universidad Católica |
|---|---|---|
| López 30' (o.g.); Vitor 40'; Gilmar 54'; Raí 60'; Müller 65' | Report | Almada 85' (pen.) |

Estádio do Morumbi, São Paulo
Attendance: 99,000
Referee: José Torres Cadena (Colombia)

| **São Paulo** | **Universidad Católica** |

| GK | 1 | (Brazil) Zetti |
| RB | 2 | (Brazil) Vitor | (substituted off) 66' |
| CB | 3 | (Brazil) Válber |
| CB | 15 | (Brazil) Gilmar |
| LB | 6 | (Brazil) Ronaldo Luiz | (substituted off) 66' |
| DM | 5 | (Brazil) Pintado |
| DM | 17 | (Brazil) Dinho |
| CM | 10 | (Brazil) Raí (c) |
| FW | 11 | (Brazil) Cafu |
| FW | 9 | (Brazil) Palhinha |
| FW | 7 | (Brazil) Müller |
Substitutes:
| GK | 12 | (Brazil) Gilberto |
| DF | 14 | (Brazil) Adílson |
| DF | 16 | (Brazil) André Luiz | (substituted on) 66' |
| FW | 18 | (Brazil) Catê | (substituted on) 66' |
| FW | 21 | (Brazil) Elivélton |
Manager:
(Brazil) Telê Santana

| GK | 12 | (Chile) Oscar Wirth |
| DF | 15 | (Chile) Leonel Contreras |
| DF | 5 | (Chile) Daniel López | (substituted off) 62' |
| DF | 3 | (Argentina) Sergio Vázquez |
| DF | 2 | (Chile) Andrés Romero |
| DF | 14 | (Chile) Raimundo Tupper |
| MF | 8 | (Argentina) Ricardo Lunari |
| MF | 19 | (Chile) Nelson Parraguez |
| MF | 6 | (Chile) Mario Lepe (c) |
| FW | 11 | (Argentina) Juan Carlos Almada |
| FW | 7 | (Chile) Luis Pérez | (substituted off) 73' |
Substitutes:
| GK | 1 | (Chile) Patricio Toledo |
| FW | 9 | (Paraguay) José Cardozo |
| MF | 10 | (Argentina) Gerardo Reinoso | (substituted on) 73' |
| MF | 16 | (Chile) Rodrigo Gómez |
| FW | 20 | (Chile) Rodrigo Barrera | (substituted on) 62' |
Manager:
(Chile) Ignacio Prieto

Assistant referees:
John Toro Rendón (Colombia)
Jorge Eliezer Zuluaga (Colombia)
Fourth official:
??? (Colombia)

=== Second leg ===
26 May 1993
Second leg

| Universidad Católica (Chile) | 2–0 | (Brazil) São Paulo |
|---|---|---|
| Lunari 9'; Almada 15' (pen.) | Report |

Estadio Nacional, Santiago
Attendance: 50,000
Referee: Juan Escobar (Paraguay)

| **Universidad Católica** | **São Paulo** |

| GK | 12 | (Chile) Oscar Wirth |
| DF | 15 | (Chile) Leonel Contreras | | (substituted off) 82' |
| DF | 3 | (Argentina) Sergio Vázquez |
| DF | 2 | (Chile) Andrés Romero |
| DF | 14 | (Chile) Raimundo Tupper | | (substituted off) 65' |
| MF | 8 | (Argentina) Ricardo Lunari |
| MF | 19 | (Chile) Nelson Parraguez |
| MF | 6 | (Chile) Mario Lepe (c) |
| MF | 11 | (Argentina) Juan Carlos Almada |
| FW | 7 | (Chile) Luis Pérez |
| FW | 20 | (Chile) Rodrigo Barrera |
Substitutes:
| GK | 1 | (Chile) Patricio Toledo |
| DF | | (Chile) Jorge Gómez |
| FW | 9 | (Paraguay) José Cardozo | | (substituted on) 82' |
| MF | 10 | (Argentina) Gerardo Reinoso | (yellow card) 87' | (substituted on) 65' |
| MF | 16 | (Chile) Rodrigo Gómez |
Manager:
(Chile) Ignacio Prieto

| GK | 1 | (Brazil) Zetti |
| RB | 2 | (Brazil) Vitor | | (substituted off) 66' |
| CB | 3 | (Brazil) Válber |
| CB | 15 | (Brazil) Gilmar | (yellow card) 63' |
| LB | 24 | (Brazil) Marcos Adriano |
| DM | 5 | (Brazil) Pintado |
| DM | 17 | (Brazil) Dinho |
| CM | 10 | (Brazil) Raí (c) |
| FW | 11 | (Brazil) Cafu |
| FW | 9 | (Brazil) Palhinha |
| FW | 7 | (Brazil) Müller |
Substitutes:
| GK | 12 | (Brazil) Gilberto |
| MF | 8 | (Brazil) Toninho Cerezo | | (substituted on) 66' (yellow card) 69' |
| DF | 14 | (Brazil) Adílson |
| DF | 16 | (Brazil) André Luiz |
| FW | 18 | (Brazil) Catê |
Manager:
(Brazil) Telê Santana

Assistant referees:
Sabino Fariña (Paraguay)
Oscar Velásquez (Paraguay)
Fourth official:
Eduardo Gamboa (Chile)
