= Marcos Bonequini =

Brazilian footballer

Personal information
- Full name: Marcos Antônio Alvim Bonequini
- Date of birth: 27 April 1970 (age 56)
- Place of birth: Jundiaí, Brazil
- Height: 1.88 m (6 ft 2 in)
- Position: Goalkeeper

Youth career
- 1985–1988: Guarani
- 1989–1991: São Paulo

Senior career*
Years	Team	Apps	(Gls)
1989–1994	São Paulo	5	(0)
1993	→ Novorizontino (loan)		
1995–1996	América-RN		
1995	→ XV de Piracicaba (loan)		
1997	America-RJ		
1997–1998	Ceará		
1999–2000	Noroeste		
2001	CRB		
2001	União Barbarense		
2002	Atlético Sorocaba		
2003	São José-SP		
2003	Noroeste		
2004	Portuguesa Santista		
- * Club domestic league appearances and goals as of 20 October 2023

Marcos Antônio Alvim Bonequini (born 27 April 1970), better known as Marcos Bonequini, is a Brazilian former professional footballer who played as a goalkeeper.

== Career ==
Started in São Paulo's youth sectors, he was Zetti's substitute goalkeeper most of the time, competing for position with other young players such as Alexandre and Rogério. He also played for teams in the interior of the state of São Paulo and for football in the northeast. Bonequini is a frequent participant in masters matches and tributes of São Paulo FC, being in the club's hall of fame.

== Honours ==
São Paulo

- Intercontinental Cup: 1992
- Copa Libertadores: 1992
- Campeonato Brasileiro: 1991
- Copa CONMEBOL: 1994
- Campeonato Paulista: 1991, 1992

Ceará

- Campeonato Cearense: 1998
