= Macedo (footballer) =

Brazilian footballer (born 1969)

Personal information
- Full name: Natanael dos Santos Macedo
- Date of birth: 16 December 1969 (age 56)
- Place of birth: Americana, Brazil
- Height: 1.71 m (5 ft 7 in)
- Position: Forward

Youth career
- 1988–1990: Rio Branco

Senior career*
Years	Team	Apps	(Gls)
1990	Rio Branco		
1990–1993	São Paulo		
1993–1994	Cádiz		
1994–1995	Santos		
1995	Cruzeiro		
1996	Vasco da Gama		
1997	Santos		
1998	Coritiba		
1999	Grêmio		
2000–2002	Ponte Preta		
2003	Fortaleza		
2004	Ponte Preta		
2005	Taubaté		
2005–2006	Atlético Sorocaba		
2006	Comercial (RP)		
2007	Itabaiana		
2008	Operário (MS)		
2009	União Mogi		

International career
1991–1992	Brazil U23	2	(0)
- * Club domestic league appearances and goals as of 4 April 2022

Natanael dos Santos Macedo, known as Macedo (16 December 1969) is a Brazilian former professional footballer.

== Career ==
At the age of 12, Macedo started in the youth levels of Rio Branco Esporte Clube. He turned professional in 1990. That year, he shared the topscorer of the second level of São Paulo league with 14 goals. In January 1991, he had the pass bought by São Paulo, in a negotiation that totaled 550.000 dollars.

Macedo arrived in São Paulo FC at the age of 20, in 1990. He stood out in the club, having even been champion of the Copa Libertadores and the Intercontinental Cup. In the second game of the 1992 Copa Libertadores Final, against Newell's Old Boys, he entered the second half and suffered a penalty which was converted by Raí. The 1–0 result took the decision to penalties kicks, and São Paulo won the title.

One day, he arrived at São Paulo training with hair extensions, Rastafarian style. The manager Telê Santana didn't like the look at all and made the player undo the hairstyle.

When he left São Paulo in 1993, he went to play for Cádiz, but his time at the Spanish club was short-lived.

With stints in other traditional clubs, such as Santos FC, Cruzeiro EC, Vasco, Grêmio, Coritiba and Fortaleza EC, Macedo also played prominently in Ponte Preta, between 2000 and 2002 and in 2004. In the final part of his career, he defended EC Taubaté, Atlético Sorocaba, Comercial de Ribeirão Preto, Itabaiana and Operário, leaving the fields in 2009, at União Mogi, then in the Campeonato Paulista Série A3.

For the Brazil national under-23 team, he played 2 games between 1991 and 1992, not scoring any goals. His son, Lucas, also become a footballer and played for São Bento in 2025.

== Honours ==
São Paulo

- Campeonato Paulista: 1991, 1992
- Campeonato Brasileiro: 1991
- Copa Libertadores: 1992, 1993
- Supercopa Libertadores: 1993
- Intercontinental Cup: 1992, 1993

Santos

- 'Torneio Rio-São Paulo: 1997

Grêmio

- Campeonato Gaúcho: 1999
- Copa Sul: 1999
