= Alexandre (footballer, born 1972) =

Brazilian footballer

Personal information
- Full name: Alexandre Escobar Ferreira
- Date of birth: 2 January 1972
- Place of birth: Sorocaba, Brazil
- Date of death: 18 July 1992 (aged 20)
- Place of death: São Paulo, Brazil
- Height: 1.90 m (6 ft 3 in)
- Position: Goalkeeper

Youth career
- –1991: São Paulo

Senior career*
Years	Team	Apps	(Gls)
1991–1992	São Paulo	8	(0)

International career
1986	Brazil U17		
- * Club domestic league appearances and goals as of 25 August 2023

Alexandre Escobar Ferreira (2 January 1972 – 18 July 1992), simply known as Alexandre, was a Brazilian football goalkeeper who played for São Paulo FC.

== Career ==
Alexandre was touted as Zetti's chosen successor, an honour that went to Rogério Ceni after Zetti himself left. His most memorable match was against Nacional in the 1992 Copa Libertadores.

== Death ==
Around 6:30 am on July 18, 1992, at km 13.5 on the Castelo Branco Highway, Alexandre lost control of his car and crashed into a barrier. He was taken to the University of São Paulo Hospital, but did not recover. His funeral was held at the CT da Barra Funda.

== Honours ==
=== São Paulo ===
- Campeonato Brasileiro: 1991
- Campeonato Paulista: 1991
- Copa Libertadores: 1992

=== Brazil U17 ===
- 1986 South American U-16 Championship: Runners-up

== See also ==
- List of association football players who died during their careers
