= Sídnei Lobo =

Brazilian footballer

Personal information
- Full name: Sídnei Espírito Santo
- Date of birth: 3 February 1970 (age 56)
- Place of birth: São Paulo, Brazil
- Position: Defensive midfielder

Youth career
- 1989–1991: São Paulo

Senior career*
Years	Team	Apps	(Gls)
1991–1995	São Paulo	74	(1)
1993	→ Rio Branco-SP (loan)		
1994	→ Ponte Preta (loan)		
1995	→ Rio Branco-SP (loan)		
1995	→ Criciúma (loan)		
1996–1998	Paraná		
1998	Fluminense		
1999	Atlético Paranaense		
2000	Araçatuba		
2000–2001	Juventude		
2002	Figueirense		
2002	Paraná		
2003	Iraty		

Managerial career
- 2004: 15 de Novembro (assistant)
- 2004–2005: Caxias (assistant)
- 2005–2007: Grêmio (assistant)
- 2008–2010: Corinthians (assistant)
- 2010–2012: Brazil (assistant)
- 2013: Flamengo (assistant)
- 2014: Corinthians (assistant)
- 2015: Cruzeiro (assistant)
- 2016: Shandong Luneng (assistant)
- 2016–2019: Cruzeiro (assistant)
- 2019: Palmeiras (assistant)
- 2020: Bahia (assistant)
- 2021: Al-Nassr (assistant)
- 2022–2023: Internacional (assistant)
- 2023–2024: Corinthians (assistant)
- 2024–2025: Fluminense (assistant)
- 2025–: Grêmio (assistant)
- * Club domestic league appearances and goals as of 4 October 2024

Sídnei Espírito Santo (born 3 February 1970), better known as Sídnei Lobo, is a Brazilian former professional footballer and manager, who played as a defensive midfielder.

== Career ==
Revealed by the youth sectors of São Paulo FC in the early 1990s, Sídnei participated in part of the club's greatest achievements, such as the 1992 Copa Libertadores, the 1991 national title and two state titles. He also had a notable stint in Paraná, winning the state championships in 1996 and 1997.

== Managerial career ==
In 2004, Sídnei became an assistant to his friend Mano Menezes, who had started his career as a coach at 15 de Novembro de Campo Bom, and since then, having participated in all of the coach's projects, including Grêmio, Corinthians and Brazil national team.

== Honours ==
São Paulo

- Copa Libertadores: 1992
- Campeonato Brasileiro: 1991
- Campeonato Paulista: 1991, 1992

Paraná

- Campeonato Paranaense: 1996, 1997

Figueirense

- Campeonato Catarinense: 2002
