= Flávio Cuca =

Brazilian footballer (born 1970)

Personal information
- Full name: Flávio Monteiro Santos
- Date of birth: 12 September 1970 (age 56)
- Place of birth: São Paulo, Brazil
- Height: 1.77 m (5 ft 10 in)
- Position: Forward

Senior career*
Years	Team	Apps	(Gls)
1991–1994	Juventus-SP		
1992	→ Atlético Mineiro (loan)	2	(0)
1992	→ São Paulo (loan)	10	(3)
1994–1998	Mulhouse	78	(27)
1995–1996	→ Saint-Étienne (loan)	17	(1)
- * Club domestic league appearances and goals

Flávio Monteiro Santos (born 12 September 1970), known simply as Cuca or Flávio Cuca, is a Brazilian former professional footballer who played as a forward.

== Career ==
Discovered by the youth ranks of Juventus-SP, Cuca was loaned to Atlético Mineiro in the first half of the 1992, and for São Paulo subsequently, being part of the state championship-winning squad that year, as well as being part of the delegation that traveled to Tokyo to compete in the 1992 Intercontinental Cup. Later he played in French football, for Mulhouse, and in 1995–96 for Saint-Étienne, playing in the Ligue 1 season. He scored only one goal for the club, against Le Havre.

== Honours ==
São Paulo

- Campeonato Paulista: 1992
