= Domizzi =

Domizzi is a surname. Notable people with the surname include:

- Cristian Domizzi (born 1969), Argentine footballer
- Maurizio Domizzi (born 1980), Italian footballer
