= Maurício (footballer, born 1971) =

Brazilian footballer

Personal information
- Full name: Maurício Cardoso da Silva
- Date of birth: 25 August 1971 (age 55)
- Place of birth: Limeira, Brazil
- Height: 1.71 m (5 ft 7 in)
- Position: Forward

Youth career
- –1991: São Paulo

Senior career*
Years	Team	Apps	(Gls)
1991–1994	São Paulo	25	(3)
1991	→ Rio Branco-SP (loan)		
1993	→ Santo André (loan)		
1993	→ Náutico (loan)		
1995	XV de Jaú		
1995–1996	União São João		
1998	Inter de Limeira		
1999	XV de Jaú		
- * Club domestic league appearances and goals

Maurício Cardoso da Silva (born 25 August 1971), known simply as Maurício and sometimes as Mauricinho, is a Brazilian former professional footballer who played as a forward.

== Career ==
Discovered in São Paulo's youth ranks, Maurício even participated in training sessions with under-16 national teams. He was part of the squad from 1991 to 1994, with some loan spells during that period, but played in the state championship-winning campaigns of 1991 and 1992. In total he played 25 matches for São Paulo, scoring 3 goals.

== Personal life ==
Maurício has a twin brother named Marcelo who did not become a player. He is currently a pastor at the Renewed Baptist Church in Limeira.

== Honours ==
São Paulo

- Campeonato Paulista: 1991, 1992
