= Ronaldão (footballer) =

Brazilian footballer

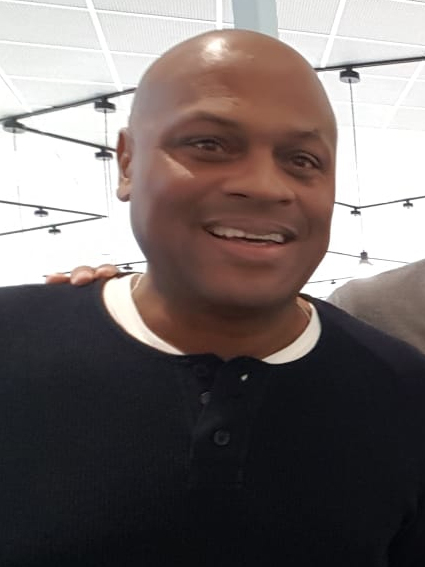
- Ronaldão in 2008

Personal information
- Full name: Ronaldo Rodrigues de Jesus
- Date of birth: 19 June 1965 (age 61)
- Place of birth: São Paulo, Brazil
- Height: 1.87 m (6 ft 2 in)
- Position: Defender

Youth career
- Rio Preto

Senior career*
Years	Team	Apps	(Gls)
1986–1993	São Paulo	85	(4)
1994–1995	Shimizu S-Pulse	46	(3)
1995–1996	Flamengo	44	(1)
1997	Santos	38	(2)
1998	Coritiba	0	(0)
1998–2002	Ponte Preta	88	(0)
Total		301	(10)

International career
1991–1995	Brazil	14	(1)
Medal record
Men's football
Representing Brazil
FIFA World Cup
Winner	1994
Copa América
Runner-up	1995 Uruguay
- * Club domestic league appearances and goals

Ronaldo Rodrigues de Jesus (born 19 June 1965 in São Paulo, Brazil) is a Brazilian former professional footballer, initially known on the football pitch as Ronaldo and then as Ronaldão (big Ronaldo) to differentiate him from his younger compatriot and teammate, also dubbed Ronaldo, who was nicknamed Ronaldinho (little Ronaldo) before this was adopted by Ronaldinho Gaúcho.

A former defender, Ronaldão played 14 matches in the Brazil national team between 1991 and 1995, scoring one goal, and winning the 1994 FIFA World Cup, although he did not play in any matches in the tournament. He was called up to the World Cup on its opening day, traveling from Japan to the United States as a substitute for injured Ricardo Gomes. He was also a member of the team that finished in second place in the 1995 Copa América.

He was also successful at club level, winning numerous domestic, continental, and international trophies, including two consecutive Copa Libertadores and Intercontinental Cup titles with São Paulo in 1992 and 1993.

== Career statistics ==
=== Club ===
Appearances and goals by club, season and competition
Club	Season	League		
Club	Season	Division	Apps	Goals
São Paulo	1986	Série A	2	0
São Paulo	1987	Série A	7	0
São Paulo	1988	Série A	8	0
São Paulo	1989	Série A	0	0
São Paulo	1990	Série A	15	1
São Paulo	1991	Série A	17	1
São Paulo	1992	Série A	22	1
São Paulo	1993	Série A	4	0
São Paulo	Total		75	3
Shimizu S-Pulse	1994	J1 League	36	3
Shimizu S-Pulse	1995	J1 League	10	0
Shimizu S-Pulse	Total		46	3
Flamengo	1995	Série A	18	0
Flamengo	1996	Série A	19	1
Flamengo	Total		37	1
Santos	1997	Série A	28	0
Coritiba	1998	Série A	0	0
Ponte Preta	1998	Série A	21	0
Ponte Preta	1999	Série A	18	0
Ponte Preta	2000	Série A	17	0
Ponte Preta	2001	Série A	10	0
Ponte Preta	2002	Série A	3	0
Ponte Preta	Total		69	0
Career total			255	7

=== International ===
Appearances and goals by national team and year
National team	Year	Apps	Goals
Brazil	1991	1	0
Brazil	1992	5	0
Brazil	1993	1	0
Brazil	1994	0	0
Brazil	1995	7	1
Total		14	1

== Honours ==
Brazil

- FIFA World Cup: 1994
- Umbro Cup: 1995

São Paulo

- Intercontinental Cup: 1992, 1993
- Copa Libertadores: 1992, 1993
- Campeonato Brasileiro: 1986, 1991
- Campeonato Paulista: 1987, 1989, 1991, 1992
- Supercopa Libertadores: 1993
- Recopa Sudamericana: 1993

Flamengo

- Campeonato Carioca: 1996
- Taça Guanabara: 1996
- Taça Rio: 1996
- Copa de Oro: 1996

Santos

- Torneio Rio-São Paulo: 1997

Individual

- São Paulo FC Hall of Fame
