= Biro-Biro =

Biro-Biro or Biro Biro may refer to:

- Biro-Biro (footballer, born 1959), born Antônio José da Silva Filho, Brazilian footballer
- Biro-Biro (footballer, born 1964), born Gilberto Ribeiro de Carvalho, Brazilian footballer
- Biro-Biro (footballer, born 1974), born João Bosco Gualberto de Freitas, Brazilian footballer
- Biro Biro (footballer, born 1994), born Diego Santos Gama Camilo, Brazilian footballer
