= Suélio Lacerda =

Brazilian footballer

Personal information
- Full name: José Suélio da Silva Lacerda
- Date of birth: 1 December 1967 (age 58)
- Place of birth: Campina Grande, Brazil
- Height: 1.76 m (5 ft 9 in)
- Position: Defensive midfielder

Youth career
- -1984: Campinense

Senior career*
Years	Team	Apps	(Gls)
1984–1985	Campinense		
1986–1990	Matsubara		
1991–1993	São Paulo	64	(1)
1993	Botafogo		
1994	Ponte Preta		
1995–1996	Bahia		
1996–1997	Necaxa		

Managerial career
- 2002: Treze (assistant)
- 2003: Botafogo-PB
- 2003: Campinense
- 2007–2008: ASA
- 2009: Baraúnas
- 2010: Campinense
- 2010: Sousa
- 2011–2012: Botafogo-PB
- 2012–2013: Sousa
- 2014: Lucena
- 2016: Paraíba de Cajazeiras
- 2017–2018: Serrano-PB
- 2021: Serrano-PB
- 2022: Treze
- * Club domestic league appearances and goals as of 26 September 2023

José Suélio da Silva Lacerda (born 1 December 1967), also known as Suélio Lacerda or simply Suélio, is a Brazilian former professional footballer and manager who played as defensive midfielder.

== Career ==
Suélio Lacerda began his career at Campinense, and in 1986 he transferred to Matsubara de Cambará, where he stayed for a few years. In 1991 he arrived at São Paulo FC where he participated in the two-time Copa Libertadores champion team led by Telê Santana. In 1993, he was also part of the Copa Conmebol winning squad for Botafogo.

== Managerial career ==
As a manager, Suélio Lacerda managed several teams, especially in the state of Paraíba. with emphasis on the 2012 Campeonato Paraibano runner-up achieved with Sousa EC.

== Honours ==
=== Player ===
São Paulo

- Campeonato Paulista: 1991, 1992
- Copa Libertadores: 1992, 1993

Botafogo

- Copa CONMEBOL: 1993
