= Gil Baiano =

Brazilian footballer (born 1966)

Personal information
- Full name: José Gildásio Pereira de Matos
- Date of birth: November 3, 1966 (age 59)
- Place of birth: Tucano, Brazil
- Height: 1.76 m (5 ft 9 in)
- Position: Right back

Senior career*
Years	Team	Apps	(Gls)
1987–1988	Guarani		
1988–1993	Bragantino	62	(?)
1993–1994	Palmeiras	7	(?)
1994	Vitória	19	(?)
1995–1996	Paraná	20	(?)
1996–1997	Sporting Portugal		
1998	Ituano		
1998	Paraná	9	(?)
1999	Bragantino		
2000	Comercial-SP		
2000	Paraná	4	(?)
2001	XV de Piracicaba		
2002	Bragantino		

International career
1990–1991	Brazil	7	(0)
- * Club domestic league appearances and goals

José Gildásio Pereira de Matos (born November 3, 1966), commonly known by the nickname Gil Baiano, is a retired professional association football right back, who played for several Campeonato Brasileiro Série A clubs, and for the Brazil national team.

== Career ==
Born in Tucano, Bahia, Gil Baiano started playing professionally in 1987, defending Campinas' club Guarani. In 1988, he was transferred to Bragantino, of Bragança Paulista, winning the Campeonato Paulista in 1990, and playing 62 Campeonato Brasileiro Série A games during his spell at the club. In 1993, he joined Palmeiras, where he played 19 Série A games. leaving the club in 1994, to defend Vitória, playing 20 games Série A until leaving the club. In 1995, he played 20 Série A games for Paraná, leaving the club in 1996, to play for Portuguese club Sporting Portugal. In 1998, he returned to Brazil, playing for Ituano, then Paraná again, where he played nine Série A games. In 1999, he played again for Bragantino, joining Comercial-SP in 2000. In 2000, he also played four Série A games for Paraná, joining XV de Piracicaba in 2001, and retiring while playing for Bragantino in 2002.

=== National team ===
Gil Baiano played seven games defending the Brazil national team, without scoring a goal. His first game was played on September 12, 1990, against Spain. He played his last game for Brazil on March 26, 1991, against Argentina.
