= Adílson (footballer, born 1965) =

Brazilian footballer (born 1965)

Personal information
- Full name: Adílson José Pinto
- Date of birth: 6 January 1965 (age 61)
- Place of birth: Cruzeiro, Brazil
- Height: 1.81 m (5 ft 11 in)
- Position: Centre-back

Youth career
- 1984–1985: Cruzeiro-SP

Senior career*
Years	Team	Apps	(Gls)
1986–1993	São Paulo	267	(2)
1991	→ Flamengo (loan)		
1993–1994	Guarani		
1994	Internacional		
1995	Bragantino		
1995	Vitória		
1996–1997	Juventude		
1998	Fluminense		
1999	Paraná		
2000	Juventude		
2002	15 de Novembro		
2003	Esportivo		
2004	Passo Fundo		

Managerial career
- 2025–: São Paulo (U13)
- * Club domestic league appearances and goals as of 10 June 2023

Adílson José Pinto (born 6 January 1965), or simply Adílson, is a former football player, who played as a centre-back. Adílson is considered one of the greatest players in the history of São Paulo.

From 13 September 1987 to 23 November 1989, Adílson played a total of 53 consecutive games as a starter for the Campeonato Brasileiro Série A, holding the record for consecutive matches played uninterruptedly in the competition.

On 2025 he became manager of the São PauloFC youth sectors.

== Honours ==
São Paulo

- Campeonato Brasileiro: 1986
- Campeonato Paulista: 1987, 1989, 1991, 1992
- Copa Libertadores: 1992, 1993
- Intercontinental Cup: 1992
