= Ronaldo Luiz =

Brazilian footballer (born 1966)

Personal information
- Full name: Ronaldo Luiz Gonçalves
- Date of birth: 14 August 1966 (age 60)
- Place of birth: Belo Horizonte, Brazil
- Height: 1.77 m (5 ft 10 in)
- Position: Defender

Senior career*
Years	Team	Apps	(Gls)
1987	Guarani-MG		
1988–1991	América Mineiro		
1992–1995	São Paulo	109	(2)
1996	Cruzeiro		
1997	América Mineiro		
1997	Coritiba		
1998	Vasco da Gama	12	(0)
2000	Avaí		
2001	Mamoré		
- * Club domestic league appearances and goals as of 10 June 2023

Ronaldo Luiz Gonçalves (born 14 August 1966), better known as Ronaldo Luiz, is a Brazilian former professional footballer who played as a defender. Disputed 109 matches for São Paulo FC, participating in the conquest of several titles. His most outstanding performance for the club's colors was against Barcelona, in the 1992 Intercontinental Cup.

== Honours ==
=== São Paulo ===
- Campeonato Paulista: 1992
- Copa Libertadores: 1992, 1993
- Intercontinental Cup: 1992, 1993
- Supercopa Libertadores: 1993
- Recopa Sudamericana: 1993
- Copa CONMEBOL: 1994

=== Cruzeiro ===
- Copa do Brasil: 1996

=== Vasco da Gama ===
- Copa Libertadores: 1998
