= Tucano, Bahia =

Coordinates: 10°57′46″S 38°47′13″W

Tucano
- Municipality
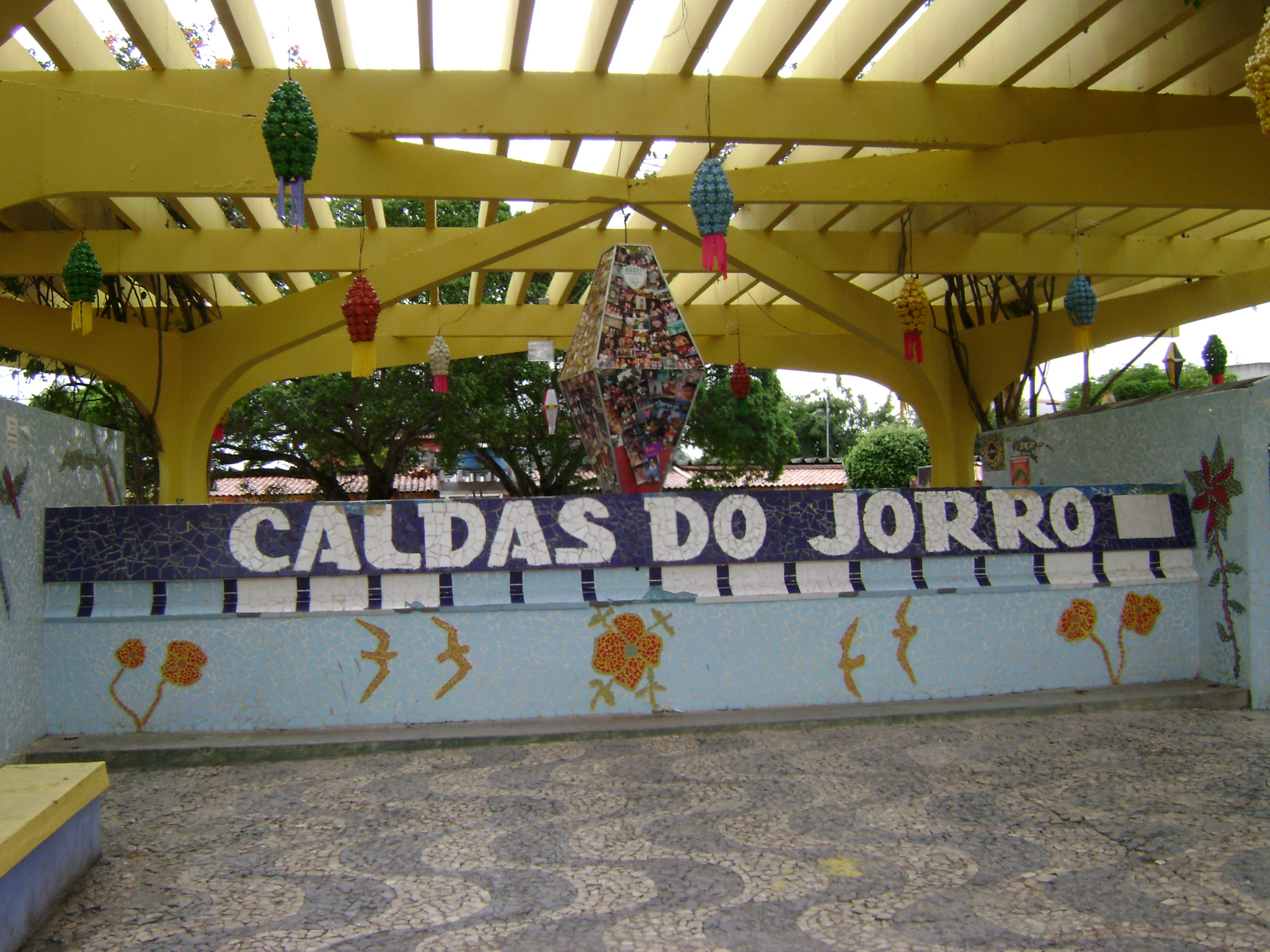

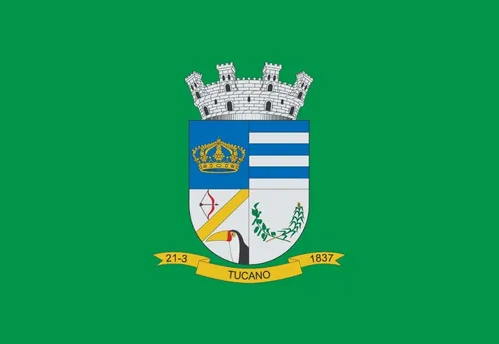
- Flag Coat of arms
- Interactive map of Tucano
- Country: Brazil
- Region: Nordeste
- State: Bahia

Population (2020)
  - Total: 50,798
- Time zone: UTC−3 (BRT)

Tucano is a municipality in the state of Bahia in the North-East region of Brazil.

== See also ==
- List of municipalities in Bahia
