= 1997 Torneio Rio-São Paulo =

Torneio Rio-São Paulo
- Season: 1997
- Champions: Santos (5th title)
- Matches: 14
- Goals: 45 (3.21 per match)
- Top goalscorer: Romário (Flamengo) – 7 goals
- Biggest home win: Flamengo 3–0 Corinthians (Jan 21)
- Biggest away win: São Paulo 1–3 Flamengo (Feb 2)

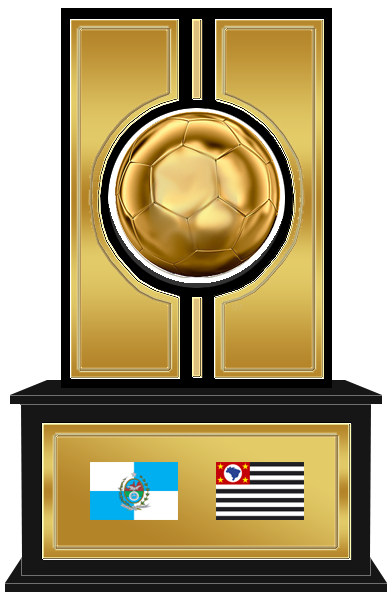
Torneio Rio-São Paulo

The 1997 Torneio Rio São Paulo was the 21st edition of the Torneio Rio-São Paulo. It was disputed between 18 January to 6 February 1997.

== Participants ==
Team	City	Ground	Nº participations	Best result
Botafogo	(Rio de Janeiro (state)) Rio de Janeiro	Maracanã	18	Champions: 1962, 1964 (shared), 1966 (shared)
Corinthians	(São Paulo (state)) São Paulo	Pacaembu	21	Champions: 1950, 1953, 1954, 1966 (shared)
Flamengo	(Rio de Janeiro (state)) Rio de Janeiro	Maracanã	20	Champions: 1961
Fluminense	(Rio de Janeiro (state)) Rio de Janeiro	Maracanã	20	Champions: 1957, 1960
Palmeiras	(São Paulo (state)) São Paulo	Parque Antártica	21	Champions: 1933, 1951, 1965, 1993
Santos	(São Paulo (state)) Santos	Vila Belmiro	17	Champions: 1959, 1963, 1964 (shared), 1966 (shared)
São Paulo	(São Paulo (state)) São Paulo	Morumbi	20	Runners-up: 1933, 1962
Vasco da Gama	(Rio de Janeiro (state)) Rio de Janeiro	São Januário	21	Champions: 1958, 1966 (shared)

== Format ==
The tournament were disputed entirely in a knockout format.

== Tournament ==
Following is the summary of the 1997 Torneio Rio-São Paulo tournament:

=== Bracket ===
Quarterfinals
(São Paulo (state)) São Paulo	2	1	3 (5)
(Rio de Janeiro (state)) Fluminense	2	1	3 (4)
(São Paulo (state)) Corinthians	0	2	2
(Rio de Janeiro (state)) Flamengo	3	0	3
(São Paulo (state)) Palmeiras	3	1	4
(Rio de Janeiro (state)) Botafogo	2	1	3
(São Paulo (state)) Santos	2	3	5 (4)
(Rio de Janeiro (state)) Vasco da Gama	2	3	5 (3)

Semifinals
(São Paulo (state)) São Paulo	0	1	1
(Rio de Janeiro (state)) Flamengo	1	3	4
(São Paulo (state)) Palmeiras	1	1	2
(São Paulo (state)) Santos	3	0	3

Finals
(Rio de Janeiro (state)) Flamengo	1	2	3
(São Paulo (state)) Santos	2	2	4

=== Finals ===
4 February 1997

Santos (São Paulo (state))	2–1	(Rio de Janeiro (state)) Flamengo
Alessandro 6'; Macedo 29'		Marcelo Ribeiro 85'

Morumbi, São Paulo
Attendance: 24,236
Referee: Cláudio Vinícius Cerdeira

6 February 1997

Flamengo (Rio de Janeiro (state))	2–2	(São Paulo (state)) Santos
Romário 37', 45'		Anderson 33'; Juari 77'

Maracanã, Rio de Janeiro
Attendance: 70,729
Referee: Oscar Roberto Godói

== Top scorers ==
Rank	Player	Club	Goals
1	Romário	Flamengo	7
2	Ramon	Vasco da Gama	4
3	Adriano	São Paulo	3
3	Alessandro	Santos	3
