= Biro-Biro (footballer, born 1964) =

Brazilian footballer

Personal information
- Full name: Gilberto Ribeiro de Carvalho
- Date of birth: June 29, 1964 (age 62)
- Place of birth: Guarujá, São Paulo, Brazil
- Height: 1.66 m (5 ft 5 in)
- Position: Left back

Senior career*
Years	Team	Apps	(Gls)
1990–1992	Bragantino	58	(0)
1992–1993	Sport	12	(0)
1994	Palmeiras		
1994–1995	Paysandu	25	(0)
1996	Bragantino	15	(0)
- Sinop
- * Club domestic league appearances and goals

Gilberto Ribeiro de Carvalho, commonly known as Biro-Biro (born June 29, 1964) is a retired professional Brazilian footballer who played as a left back for several Campeonato Brasileiro Série A clubs.

== Career ==
Born in Guarujá, São Paulo, Biro-Biro played for Bragantino from 1990 to 1992, winning the Placar's Campeonato Brasileiro Série A Bola de Prata award in 1990, and helping his club finish as Campeonato Brasileiro Série A runner-up in 1991. After playing for Sport in 1992 and in 1993, Palmeiras in 1994, playing two Copa Libertadores games, and Paysandu in 1994 and in 1995, when he played 25 Série A games, then he returned to Bragantino in 1996, where he played 15 more Campeonato Brasileiro Série A games. He eventually retired while playing for Sinop.
