= Vítor (footballer, born 1972) =

Brazilian footballer

Personal information
- Full name: Claudemir Vítor Marques
- Date of birth: 28 September 1972 (age 54)
- Place of birth: Mogi Guaçu, Brazil
- Height: 1.77 m (5 ft 10 in)
- Position: Right-back

Senior career*
Years	Team	Apps	(Gls)
1990–1994	São Paulo	17	(0)
1993	→ Real Madrid (loan)	3	(0)
1995	Corinthians	13	(1)
1996–1999	Cruzeiro	40	(0)
1998	→ Vasco da Gama (loan)	6	(0)
2000	Botafogo	15	(0)
2001–2002	Inter de Limeira		
2002	Kocaelispor	1	(0)
2003	Ceará		
2003	Osasco		
2004	Mogi Mirim		
2005	Juventus-SP		
2006–2007	Inter de Limeira		
2007	Primavera		
2009	Guaçuano		
Total		95	(1)

International career
1992–1993	Brazil	2	(0)
- * Club domestic league appearances and goals

Claudemir Vítor Marques (born 28 September 1972), commonly known as Vítor, is a Brazilian former footballer who played as a defender; he spent most of his career in Brazil.

== Playing career ==
He also played briefly for Real Madrid. When the club tried to sign Cafu for the 1993–94 season, São Paulo asked them to wait for the winter transfer window so he could play the Intercontinental Cup and offered them Vítor on loan in the meanwhile. He just took part in the first three fixtures of the championship.

Years later he played against Real Madrid in the 1998 Intercontinental Cup, while he played for Vasco da Gama on loan from Cruzeiro.

== Career statistics ==
=== Club ===
Club	Season	League			State League		Cup		Continental		Other		Total	
Club	Season	Division	Apps	Goals	Apps	Goals	Apps	Goals	Apps	Goals	Apps	Goals	Apps	Goals
São Paulo	1990	Série A	2	0	0	0	0	0	0	0	0	0	2	0
São Paulo	1991	Série A	4	0	0	0	0	0	0	0	18	1	22	1
São Paulo	1992	Série A	4	0	0	0	0	0	0	0	36 (Note: Thirty five appearances unknown, one appearance in the 1992 Intercontinental Cup)	1	40	1
São Paulo	1993	Série A	0	0	0	0	0	0	8 (Note: Appearances in the Copa Libertadores)	1	32 (Note: Thirty appearances unknown, two appearances in the Copa de Oro)	0	40	1
São Paulo	1994	Série A	7	0	0	0	0	0	9 (Note: Eight appearances in the Copa Libertadores, one appearance in the Copa CONMEBOL)	0	1 (Note: Appearances in the Supercopa Libertadores)	0	17	0
São Paulo	Total		17	0	0	0	0	0	17	1	87	2	121	3
Real Madrid (loan)	1993–94	La Liga	3	0	–		0	0	0	0	0	0	3	0
Corinthians	1995	Série A	12	0	1 (Note: Appearances in the Campeonato Paulista)	1	3 (Note: Appearances in the Copa do Brasil)	0	0	0	0	0	16	1
Cruzeiro	1996	Série A	19	0	7 (Note: Appearances in the Campeonato Mineiro)	0	6	0	0	0	2	0	34	0
Cruzeiro	1997	Série A	13	0	1	0	0	0	12	0	1 (Note: Appearances in the 1997 Intercontinental Cup)	0	27	0
Cruzeiro	1998	Série A	0	0	0	0	0	0	0	0	0	0	0	0
Cruzeiro	1999	Série A	0	0	0	0	0	0	0	0	0	0	0	0
Cruzeiro	Total		32	0	8	0	6	0	12	0	3	0	61	0
Vasco da Gama (loan)	1998	Série A	6	0	0	0	0	0	10	0	1 (Note: Appearances in the 1998 Intercontinental Cup)	0	17	0
Botafogo	2000	Série A	15	0	0	0	1	0	0	0	0	0	16	0
Kocaelispor	2001–02	Süper Lig	1	0	–		0	0	0	0	0	0	1	0
Career total			86	0	9	1	10	0	39	1	91	2	235	4

=== International ===
National team	Year	Apps	Goals
Brazil	1992	1	0
Brazil	1993	1	0
Total		2	0
