= Jairo Lenzi =

Brazilian footballer

Personal information
- Full name: Jairo Jair Lenzi
- Date of birth: 22 June 1968 (age 58)
- Place of birth: Barra Velha, Brazil
- Position: Forward

Senior career*
| Years | Team | Apps | (Gls) |
| 1987–1989 | Marcílio Dias | | |
| 1989–1992 | Criciúma | | |
| 1992 | Grêmio | | |
| 1993 | Internacional | | |
| 1993–1994 | Criciúma | | |
| 1995 | Figueirense | | |
| 1995 | Portuguesa | 3 | (0) |
| 1996 | America-RJ | | |
| 1996 | Botafogo | | |
| 1997 | Ituano | | |
| 1998 | ABC | | |
| 1999 | Sampaio Corrêa | | |
| 2000 | Bahia | | |
| 2000 | Marcílio Dias | | |
| 2001 | Ceará | | |
- * Club domestic league appearances and goals as of 29 November 2023

Jairo Lenzi (born 22 June 1968), is a Brazilian former professional footballer who played as a forward.

== Career ==
Great highlight of Criciúma EC in the early 90s, champion of the 1991 Copa do Brasil and who competed in the 1991 Copa Libertadores. He was negotiated with Grêmio but didn't have many opportunities, moving to rival Internacional, again with a discreet transition, where played again in the Copa Libertadores. He returned to Criciúma and later played for several clubs in Brazil, but without firming up for long periods.

Lenzi ended his career in 2001, playing for Ceará, after suffering a knee injury.

== Honours ==
Criciúma

- Copa do Brasil: 1991
- Campeonato Catarinense: 1990, 1991
