= Zetti =

Brazilian footballer and manager (born 1965)

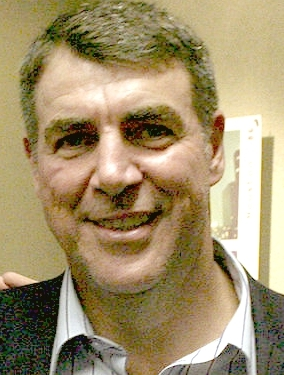

Personal information
- Full name: Armelino Donizetti Quagliato
- Date of birth: 10 January 1965 (age 61)
- Place of birth: Porto Feliz, São Paulo, Brazil
- Height: 1.89 m (6 ft 2 in)
- Position: Goalkeeper

Senior career*
Years	Team	Apps	(Gls)
1983	Toledo	0	(0)
1984	Palmeiras	0	(0)
1985	Londrina	0	(0)
1986	Guarani	?	(?)
1987–1989	Palmeiras	29	(0)
1990–1996	São Paulo	155	(0)
1997–1999	Santos	72	(0)
2000	Fluminense	0	(0)
2001	União Barbarense	0	(0)
2001	Sport Recife	?	(?)

International career
1993–1997	Brazil	17	(0)

Managerial career
- 2003–2004: Paulista
- 2004: Guarani
- 2004: Fortaleza
- 2004–2005: São Caetano
- 2005: Bahia
- 2005: Ponte Preta
- 2006–2007: Paraná
- 2007: Atlético Mineiro
- 2007: Fortaleza
- 2008: Ituano
- 2008: Juventude
- 2009: Paraná
Medal record
Men's football
Representing Brazil
FIFA World Cup
Winner	1994
- * Club domestic league appearances and goals

Armelino Donizetti Quagliato, best known as Zetti (born 10 January 1965), is a Brazilian football pundit, manager and former goalkeeper. He was a member of Brazil's victorious 1994 FIFA World Cup squad.

== Playing career ==
=== Club ===
Zetti played with São Paulo from 1990 to 1996. Arguably one of the most successful goalkeepers in the club's history he won 1 Brazilian championship, 2 Copas Libertadores and 2 Intercontinental Cups during this period. Other clubs played for include Guarani, Toledo, Londrina, Palmeiras, Santos, Fluminense and Sport.

=== International ===
He was called up to the Brazil national squad for the 1994 FIFA World Cup. He made 17 appearances for his country during the early 1990s.

== Managerial career ==
Zetti was the manager of Esporte Clube Juventude in the Brazilian league second division. On May 7, 2009, he was hired as the manager of Paraná Clube, replacing previous coach Velloso.

== Honours ==
=== Club ===
São Paulo

- Campeonato Brasileiro Série A: 1991
- Campeonato Paulista: 1991, 1992
- Copa Libertadores: 1992, 1993
- Supercopa Libertadores: 1993
- Recopa Sudamericana: 1993, 1994
- Intercontinental Cup: 1992, 1993
- Copa Master de CONMEBOL: 1996

Santos

- Torneio Rio-São Paulo: 1997

=== International ===
Brazil

- FIFA World Cup: 1994
