= Cristian Domizzi =

Argentine footballer (born 1969)

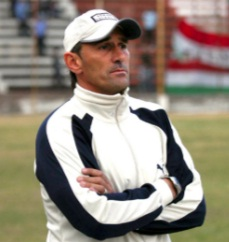

Personal information
- Full name: Cristian Eduardo Domizzi
- Date of birth: 9 June 1969 (age 57)
- Place of birth: Argentina
- Position: Striker

Senior career*
Years	Team	Apps	(Gls)
1987–1990	Central Córdoba	40	(7)
1991–1992	Newell's		
1992–1995	Atlas		
1995–1996	Independiente		
1996–1998	Pumas	45	(22)
1998	Monterrey		
1999–2000	Unión	53	(10)
2000–2001	Independiente		
2001–2002	Lanús	12	(1)
2002–2003	Newell's		

Managerial career
- 2007: Luján de Cuyo
- 2007-2009: Sportivo Belgrano
- 2010: Deportivo Guaymallén
- 2011-2012: Estudiantes de Río Cuarto
- 2012-2013: Deportivo Madryn
- 2013: San Martín de Mendoza
- 2015-2016: Club Sportivo Ben Hur
- 2016: Club Atlético Sarmiento (La Banda)
- 2017: San Lorenzo de Alem
- 2018: Club Villa Mitre
- 2018-2019: Sportivo Belgrano
- 2020-2021: Atletico Marte
- 2021: Aguila
- 2024-Present: Aguila (Sports Director)
- * Club domestic league appearances and goals

Cristian Eduardo Domizzi (born 9 June 1969) is an Argentine football manager and former footballer who last managed Águila.

== Career ==
In 1991, Domizzi signed for Argentine side Newell's. He helped the club win the league. In 1992, he signed for Mexican side Atlas. He was regarded as a fan favorite while playing for the club. He went on to play for UNAM Pumas for 2 years playing 45 games and scoring 22 goals.

== Personal life ==
Domizzi has been nicknamed "Pajaro". He is a native of Rosario, Argentina.
