= Müller (footballer, born 1966) =

Brazilian footballer

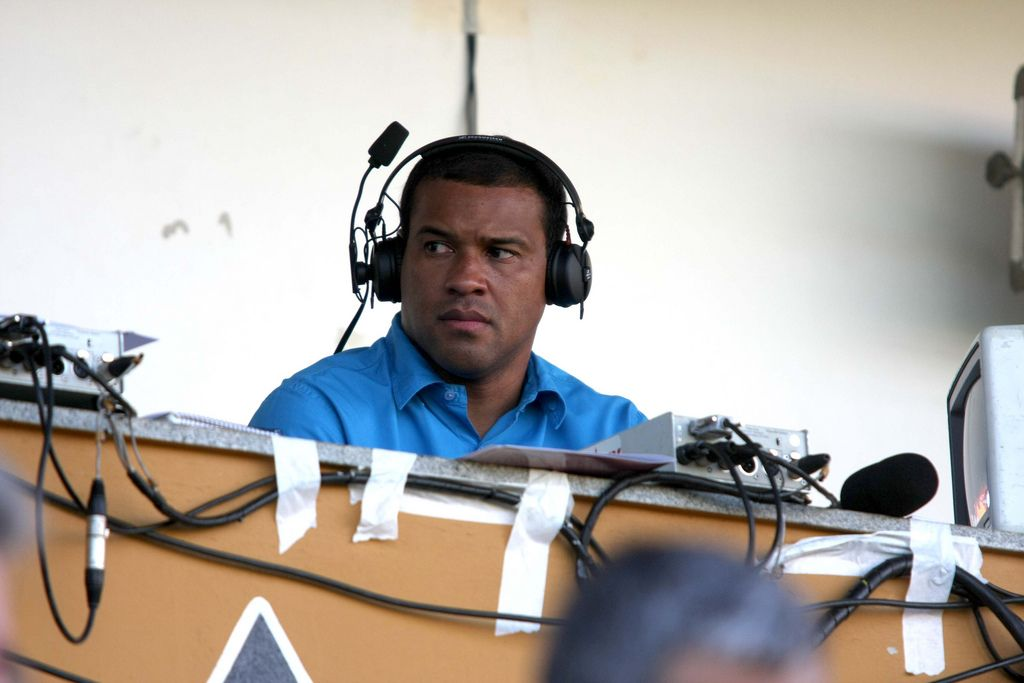

Personal information
- Full name: Luís Antônio Corrêa da Costa
- Date of birth: 31 January 1966 (age 60)
- Place of birth: Campo Grande, Brazil
- Height: 1.78 m (5 ft 10 in)
- Position: Forward

Youth career
- 1983: Operário (MS)

Senior career*
| Years | Team | Apps | (Gls) |
| 1984–1988 | São Paulo | 60 | (25) |
| 1988–1991 | Torino | 65 | (24) |
| 1991–1994 | São Paulo | 41 | (13) |
| 1994–1996 | Kashiwa Reysol | 24 | (8) |
| 1995–1996 | → Palmeiras (loan) | 20 | (8) |
| 1996 | São Paulo | 20 | (11) |
| 1997 | Perugia | 6 | (0) |
| 1997–1998 | Santos | 27 | (10) |
| 1998–2001 | Cruzeiro | 43 | (9) |
| 2000–2001 | → Corinthians (loan) | 6 | (1) |
| 2001–2002 | São Caetano | 16 | (4) |
| 2003 | Tupi | 0 | (0) |
| 2003 | Portuguesa | 7 | (1) |
| 2004 | Ipatinga | 0 | (0) |
| 2015 | Fernandópolis | 1 | (1) |
| Total | | 335 | (114) |

International career
| 1986–1998 | Brazil | 56 | (12) |

Managerial career
- 2009: Grêmio Maringá
- 2010: Sinop
- 2011: Imbituba
- 2014: Grêmio Maringá
Medal record
Men's football
Representing Brazil
FIFA World Cup
| Winner | 1994 USA |
FIFA U–20 World Cup
| Winner | 1985 USSR |
- * Club domestic league appearances and goals

Luís Antônio Corrêa da Costa, nicknamed Müller, (born January 31, 1966) is a Brazilian football pundit and retired footballer who played as a second striker.

== Club career ==
Müller is one of São Paulo's all-time leading scorers with 158 goals. With the club he won the Intercontinental Cup in 1993, scoring the third goal against A.C. Milan in Tokyo. He later had spells in Italy before returning to Brazil and retired from professional football in 2004.

== International career ==
Müller made his debut for the Brazil national team in March 1986, in a friendly against West Germany. He was on the losing side as the Germans won 2–0 in Frankfurt. He continued to appear in friendlies across that spring, including scoring his first goal for the National team against East Germany in a 3–0 home win. That summer, Müller played a part in each of Brazil's games in the 1986 FIFA World Cup in Mexico. Brazil were eliminated in the Quarter finals after losing a penalty shootout to France. Müller had been substituted by this point and his replacement, Zico, had missed a penalty (actually stopped by Joël Bats) in normal time with the scores level.

Müller played for Brazil in the 1987 Copa America. They were eliminated in the opening round by the eventual runners-up, Chile. He was then left out of Brazil's victory in the 1989 Copa America, but returned to the side in time to play in the 1990 FIFA World Cup in Italy. He registered two goals and an assist during an impressive group stage for Brazil, but the team fell to Argentina in the second round.

Müller would feature less after the World Cup and missed the 1991 Copa America, but he was recalled by Carlos Alberto Parreira and was a key player in the 1993 Copa America, where Brazil lost to Argentina on penalties in the Quarter Finals. Müller went to his third World Cup when he was named in the squad for the 1994 FIFA World Cup in the USA. By this time, Brazil's favoured strikers were Romario and Bebeto, and so Müller's contributions were limited to a nine-minute substitute appearance against Cameroon in the first round.

Müller would make fewer appearances for Brazil after the 1994 World Cup. His next appearance was in a home friendly against Wales in November 1997. His last appearance for the national team came in a friendly in September 1998 against Yugoslavia.

== Style of play ==
Müller played in an "old fashioned" left sided forward position, despite being naturally right footed. His function as a second striker was primarily that of making passes, serving his teammates, and creating goalscoring opportunities or providing assists, but he was also capable of playing as a striker, due to his effectiveness on counter-attacks, as well as his ability to make runs from the left flank or cut into the centre to strike on goal with his stronger foot.

== After football ==
After retiring from professional football in 2004, Müller worked as a television football commentator.

== Personal life ==
Müller's brother, Cocada, was also a footballer.

== Career statistics ==
=== Club ===
Appearances and goals by club, season and competition
| Club | Season | League | | |
| Club | Season | Division | Apps | Goals |
|---|---|---|---|---|
| São Paulo | 1984 | Série A | 0 | 0 |
| São Paulo | 1985 | Série A | 15 | 4 |
| São Paulo | 1986 | Série A | 30 | 11 |
| São Paulo | 1987 | Série A | 15 | 10 |
| São Paulo | 1988 | Série A | 0 | 0 |
| São Paulo | Total | | 60 | 25 |
| Torino | 1988–89 | Serie A | 31 | 11 |
| Torino | 1989–90 | Serie B | 27 | 11 |
| Torino | 1990–91 | Serie A | 7 | 2 |
| Torino | Total | | 65 | 24 |
| São Paulo | 1991 | Série A | 7 | 3 |
| São Paulo | 1992 | Série A | 17 | 5 |
| São Paulo | 1993 | Série A | 12 | 3 |
| São Paulo | 1994 | Série A | 5 | 2 |
| São Paulo | Total | | 41 | 18 |
| Kashiwa Reysol | 1994 | Football League | 13 | 3 |
| Kashiwa Reysol | 1995 | J1 League | 11 | 5 |
| Kashiwa Reysol | Total | | 24 | 8 |
| Palmeiras (loan) | 1995 | Série A | 20 | 8 |
| São Paulo | 1996 | Série A | 20 | 11 |
| Perugia | 1996–97 | Serie A | 6 | 0 |
| Santos | 1997 | Série A | 27 | 10 |
| Cruzeiro | 1998 | Série A | 22 | 5 |
| Cruzeiro | 1999 | Série A | 16 | 2 |
| Cruzeiro | 2000 | Série A | 2 | 0 |
| Cruzeiro | Total | | 40 | 7 |
| Corinthians (loan) | 2000 | Série A | 6 | 1 |
| São Paulo | 2001 | Série A | 0 | 0 |
| São Caetano | 2001 | Série A | 15 | 4 |
| São Caetano | 2002 | Série A | 0 | 0 |
| São Caetano | Total | | 15 | 4 |
| Tupi | 2003 | | 0 | 0 |
| Portuguesa Desportos | 2003 | Série B | 7 | 1 |
| Ipatinga | 2004 | Série C | 0 | 0 |
| Career total | | | 331 | 112 |

=== International ===
Appearances and goals by national team and year
| National team | Year | Apps | Goals |
|---|---|---|---|
| Brazil | 1986 | 12 | 1 |
| Brazil | 1987 | 10 | 2 |
| Brazil | 1988 | 3 | 1 |
| Brazil | 1989 | 3 | 0 |
| Brazil | 1990 | 7 | 3 |
| Brazil | 1991 | 1 | 1 |
| Brazil | 1992 | 2 | 0 |
| Brazil | 1993 | 12 | 4 |
| Brazil | 1994 | 4 | 0 |
| Brazil | 1995 | 0 | 0 |
| Brazil | 1996 | 0 | 0 |
| Brazil | 1997 | 1 | 0 |
| Brazil | 1998 | 1 | 0 |
| Total | | 56 | 12 |

== Honours ==
São Paulo

- São Paulo State League: 1985, 1987, 1991, 1992
- Brazilian League: 1986, 1991
- Copa Libertadores: 1992, 1993
- Intercontinental Cup: 1992, 1993
- Libertadores Supercup: 1993

Torino

- Serie B: 1989–90
- Mitropa Cup: 1991

Palmeiras

- São Paulo State League: 1996
- Copa do Brasil runner-up: 1996

Cruzeiro

- Minas Gerais State League: 1998
- Recopa Sudamericana: 1998
- Brazilian Cup: 2000

Corinthians

- South Minas Cup: 2001

Brazil U20

- FIFA World Youth Championship: 1985

Brazil

- Rous Cup: 1987
- FIFA World Cup: 1994

Individual

- Brazilian League Top Scorer: 1987
- Top player of the Intercontinental Cup's final: 1992
- Bola de Prata: 1997
