= 1992 Intercontinental Cup =

Association football match

- Match programme cover
Barcelona	São Paulo
(Spain)	(Brazil)
1	2
- Date: 12 December 1992
- Venue: National Stadium, Tokyo
- Man of the Match: Raí (São Paulo)
- Referee: Juan Carlos Loustau (Argentina)
- Attendance: 60,000

The 1992 Intercontinental Cup was an association football match played on 12 December 1992, between FC Barcelona, winners of the 1991–92 European Cup, and São Paulo, winners of the 1992 Copa Libertadores. The match was played at the National Stadium in Tokyo and was won by São Paulo 2–1. Raí was named as man of the match.

== Venue ==
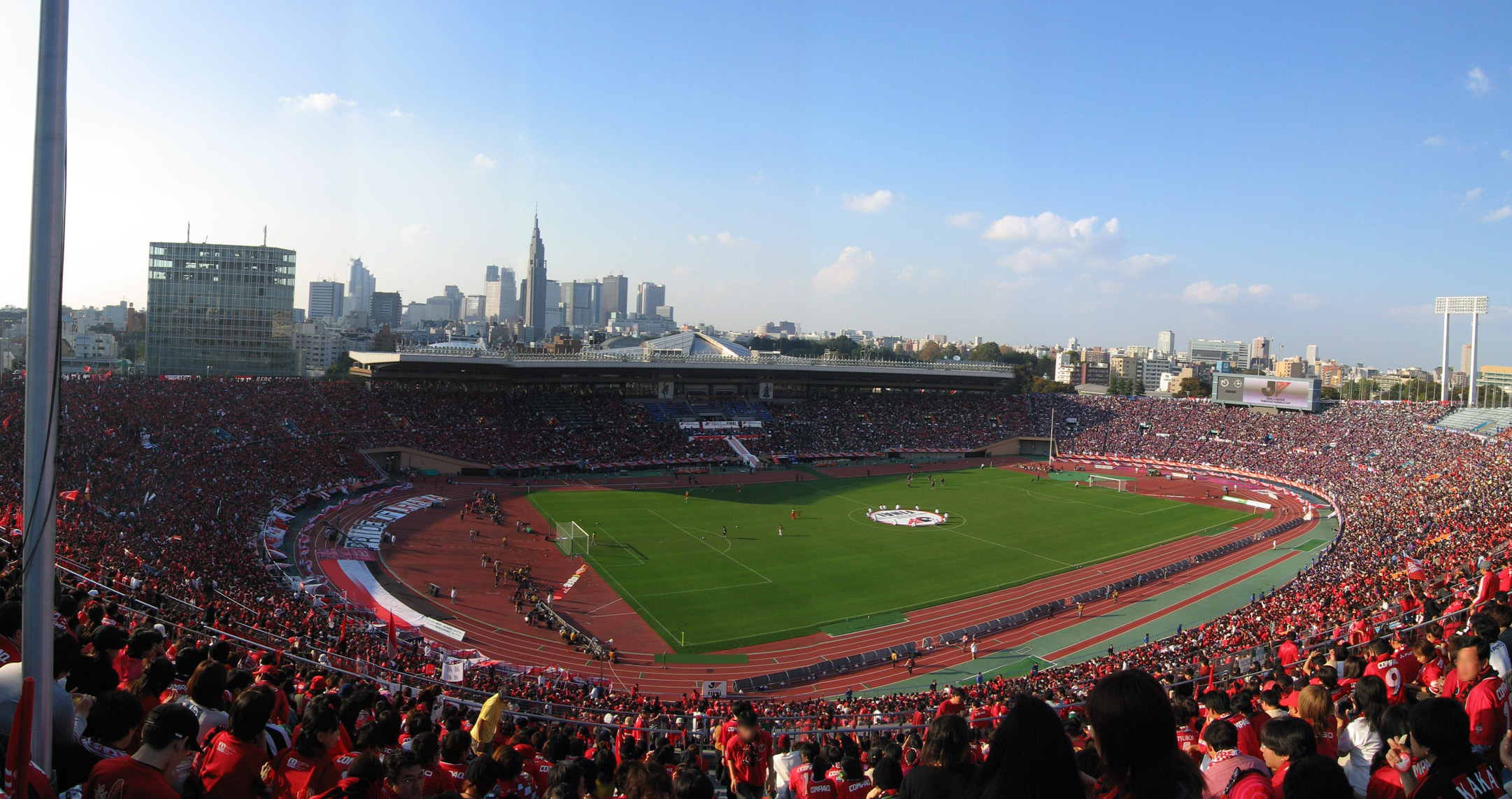
The National Stadium in Tokyo hosted the match

== Match details ==
12 December 1992
12:00 (UTC+09:00)

Barcelona (Spain)	1–2	(Brazil) São Paulo
Stoichkov 12'	Report	Raí 27', 78'

National Stadium, Tokyo
Attendance: 60,000
Referee: Juan Carlos Loustau (Argentina)

Barcelona	São Paulo

GK	1	(Spain) Andoni Zubizarreta (c)
DF	2	(Spain) Albert Ferrer	(yellow card) 88'
DF	4	(Netherlands) Ronald Koeman
DF	5	(Spain) Eusebio
MF	7	(Spain) Guillermo Amor
MF	3	(Spain) Pep Guardiola
MF	10	(Netherlands) Richard Witschge
MF	6	(Spain) José Mari Bakero		(substituted off) 52'
FW	11	(Spain) Txiki Begiristain	(yellow card) 43'	(substituted off) 81'
FW	9	(Denmark) Michael Laudrup
FW	8	(Bulgaria) Hristo Stoichkov
Substitutes:
GK	13	(Spain) Carles Busquets
DF	12	(Spain) José Ramón Alexanko
MF	14	(Spain) Miguel Ángel Nadal		(substituted on) 81'
DF	15	(Spain) Juan Carlos
FW	16	(Spain) Jon Andoni Goikoetxea	(yellow card) 89'	(substituted on) 52'
Manager:
(Netherlands) Johan Cruyff

GK	1	(Brazil) Zetti
DF	2	(Brazil) Vítor
DF	3	(Brazil) Adilson
DF	4	(Brazil) Ronaldão	(yellow card) 26'
DF	6	(Brazil) Ronaldo Luiz
MF	5	(Brazil) Pintado
MF	8	(Brazil) Toninho Cerezo	(yellow card) 58'	(substituted off) 82'
MF	10	(Brazil) Raí (c)
FW	11	(Brazil) Cafu
FW	9	(Brazil) Palhinha
FW	7	(Brazil) Müller
Substitutes:
GK	12	(Brazil) Marcos Bonequini
DF	13	(Brazil) Válber
MF	14	(Brazil) Dinho		(substituted on) 82'
FW	15	(Brazil) Catê
FW	16	(Brazil) Elivélton
Manager:
(Brazil) Telê Santana

Man of the Match:
Raí (São Paulo)

== See also ==
- 1991–92 European Cup
- 1992 Copa Libertadores
- FC Barcelona in international football competitions
