= 1991 Campeonato Brasileiro Série A =

Campeonato Brasileiro Série A
- Season: 1991
- Champions: São Paulo (3rd title)
- Copa Libertadores: São Paulo; Criciúma (via Copa do Brasil)

The 1991 Campeonato Brasileiro Série A was the 35th edition of the Campeonato Brasileiro Série A. The competition was won by São Paulo. Santos Futebol Clube's Paulinho McLaren, with 15 goals, was the competition's top goal scorer.

== Overview ==
It was contested by 20 teams, and São Paulo won the championship. 20 teams played against each other once in the first stage. The four best-placed teams qualified to the semi-finals, played in two legs. The semi-final winners qualified to the final, played in two legs.

== Standings ==
=== First stage ===
Pos	Team	Pld	W	D	L	GF	GA	GD	Pts	Qualification or relegation
1	São Paulo	19	11	4	4	26	14	+12	26	Qualified to Semifinals
2	Bragantino	19	9	8	2	27	14	+13	26	Qualified to Semifinals
3	Fluminense	19	10	4	5	28	19	+9	24	Qualified to Semifinals
4	Atlético Mineiro	19	8	8	3	28	19	+9	24	Qualified to Semifinals
5	Corinthians	19	8	8	3	23	17	+6	24	
6	Palmeiras	19	7	8	4	20	19	+1	22	
7	Internacional	19	5	10	4	19	16	+3	20	
8	Santos	19	7	5	7	23	20	+3	19	
9	Flamengo	19	7	5	7	20	24	−4	19	
10	Portuguesa	19	5	9	5	14	15	−1	19	
11	Vasco da Gama	19	4	11	4	22	26	−4	19	
12	Botafogo	19	6	6	7	19	21	−2	18	
13	Bahia	19	5	8	6	16	18	−2	18	
14	Náutico	19	7	3	9	19	25	−6	17	
15	Goiás	19	6	5	8	27	24	+3	17	
16	Cruzeiro	19	5	6	8	23	28	−5	16	
17	Atlético Paranaense	19	5	5	9	27	28	−1	15	
18	Sport	19	4	5	10	15	30	−15	13	
19	Grêmio	19	3	6	10	15	24	−9	12	Relegated
20	Vitória	19	3	6	10	17	27	−10	12	Relegated

=== Playoffs ===
Semi-finals
Atlético Mineiro	1	0	1
São Paulo	1	0	1
Fluminense	0	1	1
Bragantino	1	1	2

Final
São Paulo	1	0	1
Bragantino	0	0	0

== The final ==
June 5, 1991

São Paulo	1 – 0	Bragantino
Mário Tilico 49'

Morumbi (São Paulo)
Attendance: 67,759
Referee: Márcio Rezende de Freitas Minas Gerais

São Paulo: Zetti; Cafu, Antônio Carlos, Ricardo Rocha and Leonardo; Ronaldão, Bernardo and Raí; Müller, Macedo and Elivélton (Mário Tilico). Head coach: Telê Santana.

Bragantino: Marcelo; Gil Baiano, Júnior, Nei and Biro-Biro; Mauro Silva, Alberto and Mazinho Oliveira; Ivair (Luís Müller), Sílvio and Ronaldo Alfredo (Franklin). Head coach: Carlos Alberto Parreira.

June 9, 1991

Bragantino	0 – 0	São Paulo

Estádio Marcelo Stéfani (Bragança Paulista)
Attendance: 12,492
Referee: José Roberto Wright São Paulo

Bragantino: Marcelo; Gil Baiano, Júnior, Nei and Biro-Biro; Mauro Silva, Alberto and Mazinho Oliveira; Ivair (Luís Müller), Sílvio and João Santos (Franklin). Head coach: Carlos Alberto Parreira.

São Paulo: Zetti; Zé Teodoro, Antônio Carlos, Ricardo Rocha and Leonardo; Ronaldão, Bernardo, Cafu and Raí; Macedo and Müller (Flávio). Head coach: Telê Santana.

== Final standings ==
Pos	Team	Pld	W	D	L	GF	GA	GD	Pts	
1	São Paulo	23	12	7	4	28	15	+13	31	1992 Copa Libertadores
2	Bragantino	23	10	10	3	29	16	+13	30	
3	Atlético Mineiro	21	8	10	3	29	20	+9	26	
4	Fluminense	21	10	5	6	29	21	+8	25	
5	Corinthians	19	8	8	3	23	17	+6	24	
6	Palmeiras	19	7	8	4	20	19	+1	22	
7	Internacional	19	5	10	4	19	16	+3	20	
8	Santos	19	7	5	7	23	20	+3	19	
9	Flamengo	19	7	5	7	20	24	−4	19	
10	Portuguesa	19	5	9	5	14	15	−1	19	
11	Vasco da Gama	19	4	11	4	22	26	−4	19	
12	Botafogo	19	6	6	7	19	21	−2	18	
13	Bahia	19	5	8	6	16	18	−2	18	
14	Náutico	19	7	3	9	19	25	−6	17	
15	Goiás	19	6	5	8	27	24	+3	17	
16	Cruzeiro	19	5	6	8	23	28	−5	16	
17	Atlético Paranaense	19	5	5	9	27	28	−1	15	
18	Sport	19	4	5	10	15	30	−15	13	
19	Grêmio	19	3	6	10	15	24	−9	12	
20	Vitória	19	3	6	10	17	27	−10	12	
