= 1991 Campeonato Paulista =

Campeonato Paulista – Série A1
- Season: 1991
- Champions: São Paulo
- Relegated: São Bento
- Copa do Brasil: Corinthians; Palmeiras
- Matches played: 390
- Goals scored: 756 (1.94 per match)
- Top goalscorer: Raí (São Paulo) – 20 goals
- Biggest home win: São Paulo 5–0 São José (October 12, 1991); Bragantino 5–0 Ituano (October 20, 1991)
- Biggest away win: Catanduvense 0–5 São Paulo (September 18, 1991)
- Highest scoring: São Paulo 5–2 Marília (August 7, 1991); União São João 4–3 Ponte Preta (August 18, 1991); Santo André 4–3 Noroeste (October 23, 1991)

The 1991 Campeonato Paulista da Primeira Divisão de Futebol Profissional was the 90th season of São Paulo's top professional football league. São Paulo won the championship for the 17th time. São Bento was relegated.

== Championship ==
The twenty-eight teams competing in the championship were divided into two groups of fourteen teams. The Green Group comprised the teams that had qualified to the Third Phase and the winners of the Second Phase's two groups in the previous year, and the Yellow Group comprised other the ten teams that had been eliminated in the Second Phase, and the four teams that had been promoted from the second level. The bottom team in the Yellow Group would be relegated.

The Second phase's eight teams were divided into two groups of four, with every team playing twice against the teams of its own group and the winners of each group qualifying to the Finals.

=== First phase ===
==== Green Group ====
Pos	Team	Pld	W	D	L	GF	GA	GD	Pts	Qualification or relegation
1	Corinthians	26	9	14	3	27	14	+13	32	Qualified
2	Palmeiras	26	12	7	7	21	15	+6	31	Qualified
3	Botafogo	26	9	13	4	21	14	+7	31	Qualified
4	Portuguesa	26	11	8	7	25	21	+4	30	Qualified
5	Guarani	26	10	10	6	25	15	+10	30	Qualified
6	Bragantino	26	10	9	7	29	22	+7	29	
7	Santos	26	7	13	6	21	15	+6	27	
8	Ituano	26	9	8	9	22	29	−7	26	
9	América	26	5	14	7	15	21	−6	24	1992 Group B
10	XV de Piracicaba	26	7	8	11	22	27	−5	22	1992 Group B
11	Novorizontino	26	6	10	10	22	29	−7	22	1992 Group B
12	XV de Jaú	26	6	9	11	26	34	−8	21	1992 Group B
13	Ferroviária	26	5	13	8	16	18	−2	23	1992 Group B
14	Mogi Mirim	26	5	9	12	21	35	−14	19	1992 Group B

Updated to match(es) played on November 3, 1991. Source: RSSSF.com
Rules for classification: 1) points; 2) wins; 3) goal difference; 4) number of goals scored.

==== Yellow Group ====
Pos	Team	Pld	W	D	L	GF	GA	GD	Pts	Qualification or relegation
1	São Paulo	26	17	8	1	50	20	+30	42	Qualified
2	Inter de Limeira	26	16	2	8	37	22	+15	34	Qualified
3	Santo André	26	10	12	4	39	29	+10	32	Qualified
4	Noroeste	26	9	10	7	28	25	+3	28	1992 Group A
5	Sãocarlense	26	9	10	7	31	29	+2	28	1992 Group A
6	Juventus	26	9	10	7	23	24	−1	28	1992 Group A
7	Ponte Preta	26	8	11	7	26	18	+8	27	
8	Rio Branco	26	10	5	11	24	22	+2	25	
9	União São João	26	7	10	9	26	26	0	24	
10	São José	26	8	7	11	23	33	−10	23	
11	Marília	26	7	7	12	25	30	−5	21	
12	Catanduvense	26	4	12	10	15	33	−18	20	
13	Olímpia	26	5	9	12	16	30	−14	19	
14	São Bento	26	4	7	15	18	36	−18	15	Relegated

Updated to match(es) played on November 3, 1991. Source: RSSSF.com
Rules for classification: 1) points; 2) wins; 3) goal difference; 4) number of goals scored.

=== Second phase ===
==== Group 1 ====
Pos	Team	Pld	W	D	L	GF	GA	GD	Pts	Qualification or relegation
1	Corinthians	6	6	0	0	11	2	+9	12	Qualified
2	Portuguesa	6	4	0	2	8	6	+2	8	
3	Inter de Limeira	6	1	0	5	4	9	−5	2	
4	Santo André	6	1	0	5	5	11	−6	2	

Updated to match(es) played on December 1, 1991. Source: RSSSF.com
Rules for classification: 1) points; 2) best season record; 3) wins; 4) goal difference.

==== Group 2 ====
Pos	Team	Pld	W	D	L	GF	GA	GD	Pts	Qualification or relegation
1	São Paulo	6	3	3	0	13	7	+6	9	Qualified
2	Palmeiras	6	4	1	1	11	5	+6	9	
3	Guarani	6	2	1	3	8	11	−3	5	
4	Botafogo	6	0	1	5	4	13	−9	1	

Updated to match(es) played on December 1, 1991. Source: RSSSF.com
Rules for classification: 1) points; 2) best season record; 3) wins; 4) goal difference.

=== Finals ===
Team 1	Agg.	Team 2	1st leg	2nd leg
São Paulo	3–0	Corinthians	3–0	0–0
