= 1992 Campeonato Paulista =

Campeonato Paulista - Série A1
- Season: 1992
- Champions: São Paulo
- Copa do Brasil: São Paulo; Palmeiras
- Matches played: 390
- Goals scored: 889 (2.28 per match)
- Top goalscorer: Válber (Mogi Mirim) - 17 goals
- Biggest home win: Mogi Mirim 6-0 Catanduvense (August 2, 1992); São Paulo 6-0 Noroeste (October 15, 1992)
- Biggest away win: Catanduvense 0-6 Ponte Preta (October 7, 1992)
- Highest scoring: Noroeste 5-4 Botafogo (August 9, 1992)

The 1992 Campeonato Paulista de Futebol Profissional da Primeira Divisão - Série A1 was the 91st season of São Paulo's top professional football league. São Paulo won the championship for the 18th time. No teams were relegated.

== Championship ==
The twenty-eight teams competing in the championship were divided into two groups of fourteen teams. Group A comprised the eight best teams of the Green Group and the six best teams of the Yellow Group in the previous year. Group B comprised the bottom six of the Green Group, the other teams of the Yellow Group and the champion of the second level. Every team played twice against the teams of its own group, and the six best teams of Group A and the two best teams of Group B qualified to the Second phase. No teams were to be relegated that year.

The Second phase's eight teams were divided into two groups of four, with every team playing twice against the teams of its own group and the winners of each group qualifying to the Finals.

=== First phase ===
==== Group A ====
Pos	Team	Pld	W	D	L	GF	GA	GD	Pts	Qualification or relegation
1	São Paulo	26	14	8	4	43	22	+21	36	Qualified
2	Palmeiras	26	12	9	5	30	16	+14	33	Qualified
3	Corinthians	26	12	8	6	32	20	+12	32	Qualified
4	Santos	26	10	12	4	39	23	+16	32	Qualified
5	Portuguesa	26	10	11	5	34	20	+14	31	Qualified
6	Guarani	26	8	14	4	30	26	+4	30	Qualified
7	Ituano	26	8	12	6	31	29	+2	28	
8	Bragantino	26	10	6	10	24	25	−1	26	
9	Noroeste	26	9	7	10	22	32	−10	25	
10	Juventus	26	8	9	9	25	27	−2	25	
11	Botafogo	26	7	7	12	24	37	−13	21	1993 Group B
12	Santo André	26	3	13	10	20	32	−12	19	1993 Group B
13	Sãocarlense	26	4	8	14	25	41	−16	16	1993 Group B
14	Inter de Limeira	26	2	6	18	14	43	−29	10	1993 Group B

Updated to match(es) played on 1 November 1992. Source: RSSSF.com
Rules for classification: 1) points; 2) wins; 3) goal difference; 4) number of goals scored.

==== Group B ====
Pos	Team	Pld	W	D	L	GF	GA	GD	Pts	Qualification or relegation
1	Mogi Mirim	26	16	5	5	43	21	+22	37	Qualified
2	Ponte Preta	26	13	10	3	43	22	+21	36	Qualified
3	Rio Branco	26	13	8	5	35	20	+15	34	1993 Group A
4	União São João	26	11	10	5	35	26	+9	32	1993 Group A
5	Marília	26	11	8	7	36	29	+7	30	1993 Group A
6	XV de Piracicaba	26	9	12	5	35	28	+7	30	1993 Group A
7	Novorizontino	26	8	9	9	27	26	+1	25	
8	Olímpia	26	8	9	9	24	25	−1	25	
9	Ferroviária	26	9	6	11	25	22	+3	24	
10	América	26	8	8	10	39	39	0	24	
11	Araçatuba	26	5	10	11	16	25	−9	20	
12	São José	26	4	11	11	22	34	−12	19	
13	XV de Jaú	26	7	3	16	24	50	−26	17	
14	Catanduvense	26	2	7	17	10	47	−37	11	

Updated to match(es) played on 1 November 1992. Source: RSSSF.com
Rules for classification: 1) points; 2) wins; 3) goal difference; 4) number of goals scored.

=== Second phase ===
==== Group 1 ====
Pos	Team	Pld	W	D	L	GF	GA	GD	Pts	Qualification or relegation
1	São Paulo	6	5	1	0	14	4	+10	11	Qualified
2	Portuguesa	6	3	1	2	8	8	0	7	
3	Ponte Preta	6	1	2	3	5	8	−3	4	
4	Santos	6	1	0	5	5	12	−7	2	

Updated to match(es) played on 29 November 1992. Source: RSSSF.com
Rules for classification: 1) points; 2) wins; 3) goal difference; 4) number of goals scored.

==== Group 2 ====
Pos	Team	Pld	W	D	L	GF	GA	GD	Pts	Qualification or relegation
1	Palmeiras	6	4	0	2	8	7	+1	8	Qualified
2	Corinthians	6	3	1	2	12	10	+2	7	
3	Guarani	6	3	0	3	12	9	+3	6	
4	Mogi Mirim	6	1	1	4	5	11	−6	3	

Updated to match(es) played on 29 November 1992. Source: RSSSF.com
Rules for classification: 1) points; 2) wins; 3) goal difference; 4) number of goals scored.

=== Finals ===
Team 1	Agg.	Team 2	1st leg	2nd leg
São Paulo	6–3	Palmeiras	4-2	2–1
