= Neymar =

Brazilian footballer (born 1992)

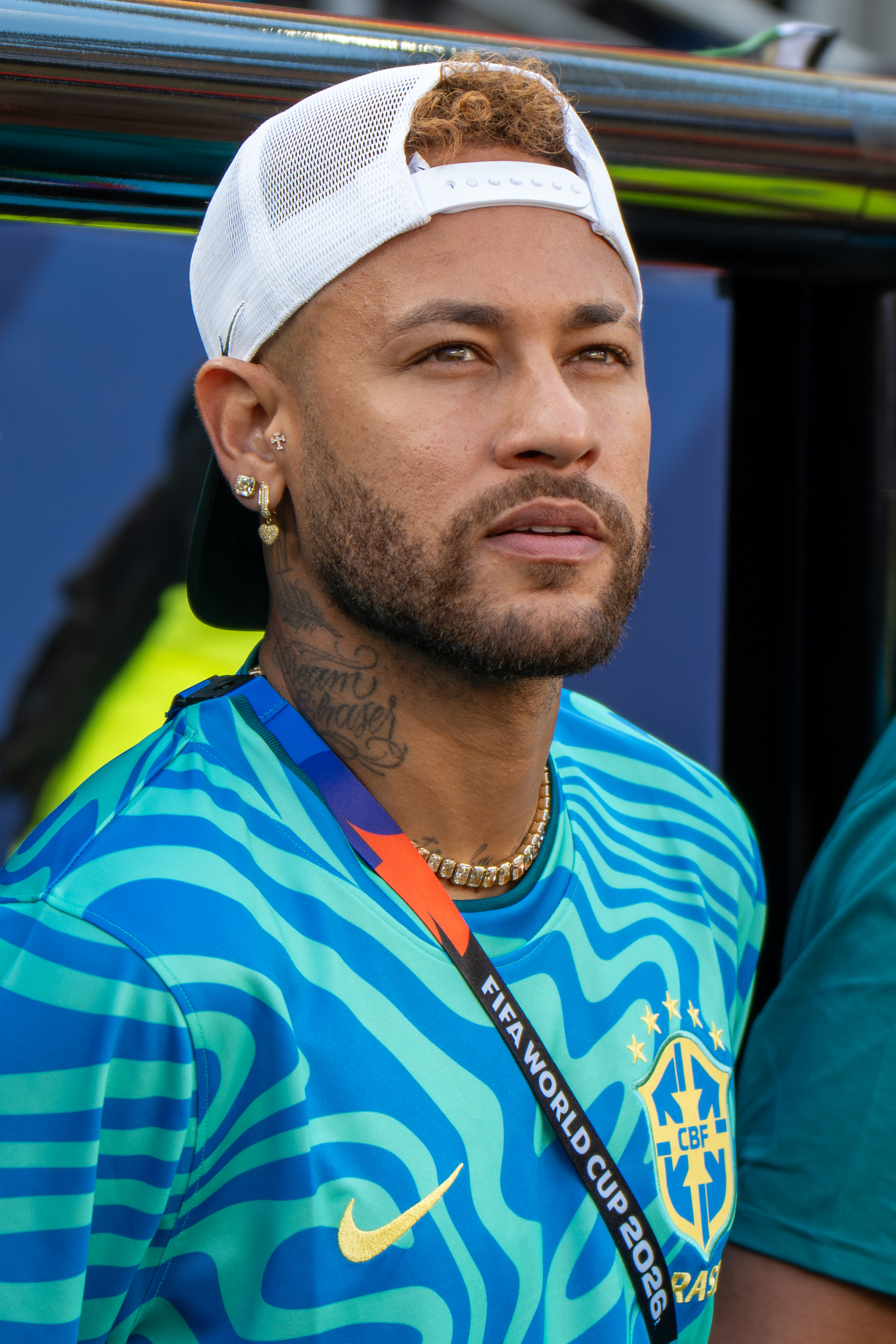
- Neymar with Brazil in 2026

Personal information
- Full name: Neymar da Silva Santos Júnior
- Date of birth: 5 February 1992 (age 34)
- Place of birth: Mogi das Cruzes, São Paulo, Brazil
- Height: 1.75 m (5 ft 9 in)
- Positions: Attacking midfielder; forward

Team information
- Current team: Santos
- Number: 10

Youth career
- 1999–2003: Portuguesa Santista
- 2003–2009: Santos

Senior career*
Years	Team	Apps	(Gls)
2009–2013	Santos	179	(107)
2013–2017	Barcelona	123	(68)
2017–2023	Paris Saint-Germain	112	(82)
2023–2025	Al-Hilal	3	(0)
2025–	Santos	45	(19)

International career
2009	Brazil U17	3	(1)
2011	Brazil U20	7	(9)
2012–2016	Brazil U23	14	(8)
2010–2026	Brazil	130	(80)
Medal record
Men's Football
Representing Brazil
FIFA Confederations Cup
Winner	2013 Brazil
Copa América
Runner-up	2021 Brazil
Summer Olympics
Gold medal – first place	2016 Rio de Janeiro	Team
Silver medal – second place	2012 London	Team
South American U-20 Championship
Winner	2011 Peru
Website	neymarjr.com
Signature
- * Club domestic league appearances and goals as of 02:23, 19 November 2026 (UTC)

Neymar da Silva Santos Júnior (Note: Brazilian Portuguese pronunciation: [nejˈmaʁ dɐ ˈsiwvɐ ˈsɐ̃tuz‿ˈʒuni.oʁ]) (born 5 February 1992), is a Brazilian professional footballer who plays as an attacking midfielder and a forward for the Campeonato Brasileiro Série A club Santos, which he also captains. He is known for his dribbling, technical ability, agility, passing, and finishing. Often regarded as one of the greatest players of all time, Neymar is both the all-time top goalscorer (80) and assist provider (59) for the Brazil national team. He is one of the few players to have scored over 100 goals with three different clubs. (Note: The other four players are Isidro Lángara, Romário, Cristiano Ronaldo, and Robert Lewandowski.) Official performance data ranked him as one of the top two players in Europe for five consecutive seasons from 2015–16 to 2019–20, ranking as the best player in 2016–17 and 2017–18.

Neymar made his professional debut with Santos in 2009 and soon emerged as a teenage sensation. In 2011, he led Santos to the Copa Libertadores title and was named the tournament's best player. Neymar joined Barcelona in 2013, where he was part of the MSN attacking trio alongside Lionel Messi and Luis Suárez. He finished as the joint top scorer in the UEFA Champions League and the joint top scorer in the Copa del Rey as Barcelona completed the continental treble in 2014–15. At the age of 23, Neymar was viewed as one of the world's three best players, alongside Messi and Cristiano Ronaldo.

In 2017, Neymar joined Paris Saint-Germain in a world-record €222 million transfer that made him one of the world's highest-paid sportsmen. However, his time at the club was largely affected by injuries. Despite this, he was particularly influential to Ligue 1 title wins in 2017–18, 2019–20 and 2022–23, but finished as Champions League runners-up with PSG in 2020. In 2020–21, Neymar became the first player to score 20 goals in the Champions League with two different clubs. With 118 goals, he is PSG's fourth-all-time top goalscorer. In 2023, he joined Saudi club Al-Hilal before returning to Santos in January 2025.

Neymar was capped 130 times for the Brazil national team, the second-most for the country. He appeared in four consecutive FIFA World Cups from 2014 to 2026, scoring nine goals in 15 matches. His international honours include the 2013 FIFA Confederations Cup, for which he won the Golden Ball, as well as an Olympic gold medal in 2016 — the nation's first — and a silver medal in 2012. After missing Brazil's triumph at the 2019 Copa América due to injury, Neymar led them to the final of the 2021 Copa América, for which he jointly received the Golden Ball. He retired from international football in 2026.

One of the world's most famous athletes, Neymar has been named the world's most marketable athlete by SportsPro, has appeared regularly on Forbes' annual list of the world's highest-paid athletes, and was included in the Time 100 Most Influential People list in 2017.

== Early life ==
Neymar was born in Mogi das Cruzes, São Paulo, to Neymar Santos Sr. and Nadine da Silva and had a Christian upbringing. He inherited his name from his father, who is a former footballer and became his son's advisor as Neymar's talents began to grow. Neymar comments on his father's role: "My father has been by my side since I was little. He takes care of things, my finances and my family." Neymar has a very close sibling relationship with his sister Rafaella Beckran. He honoured Beckran by tattooing her face on his arm while she tattooed her brother's eyes on her arm.

Growing up, Neymar combined his love of futsal with street football. Neymar said that futsal had a massive influence on him growing up, helping him develop his technique, speed of thought and ability to perform moves in tight spaces. He was inspired by Robinho — his "idol" — Ronaldinho, Lionel Messi and Wayne Rooney.

In 2003, Neymar moved with his family to São Vicente, where he began playing for youth side Portuguesa Santista. Then, later in 2003, they moved to Santos, where Neymar joined Santos. With the success of his youth career and added income, the family bought their first property, a house next to Vila Belmiro, Santos' home stadium. Their quality of family life improved, as at age 15, Neymar was earning 10000 reais per month and at 16, 125000 reais per month. At 17, he signed his first full professional contract, was upgraded to the Santos first team, and began signing his first sponsorship deals.

== Club career ==
=== Santos ===
==== Youth ====
Neymar began playing football at an early age and he was soon spotted by Santos who offered him a contract in 2003; where he was inducted into their youth academy, which has, in the past, produced Brazilian internationals like Coutinho, Clodoaldo, Diego, Elano and Alex. He also joined the likes of Pepe, Pelé and Robinho in starting out his career at the club, nicknamed Peixe. While in the youth academy, Neymar met Paulo Henrique Ganso, becoming good friends in the process. Aged 14, Neymar travelled to Spain for tryouts with the Real Madrid youth team. He did not stay in Madrid, however, as his father decided at the time that he preferred the young prodigy to keep growing up while playing at Santos.

==== 2009–11: Teenage sensation and Copa Libertadores triumph ====
"The 18-year-old is a magnificent prospect. He is sleek and skilful, able to beat the defender on either side, capable of combining well, and full of tricks he can put to productive use in and around the penalty area."

— South American football journalist Tim Vickery on Neymar in 2010.

Neymar made his professional debut on 7 March 2009, one month after turning 17 years old, in a 2–1 win against Oeste in the 2009 Campeonato Paulista. On 11 April, Neymar scored the decisive goal in a 2–1 win against Palmeiras in the 2009 Campeonato Paulista semi-final first leg. In the final, however, Santos suffered a 4–2 aggregate defeat to Corinthians. Neymar continued his rapid development in 2010, scoring 42 goals in 60 matches in all competitions and helping Santos win its first ever Copa do Brasil title, where he finished as the tournament's top scorer with 11 goals. It was a breakout season for him, emerging as one of the hottest prospects in world football and being heralded the 'new Pelé'. However, his apparent tendency for diving and his fallout with manager Dorival Júnior drew criticism.

In the 2010 summer transfer window, Santos received bids for Neymar from Premier League clubs Chelsea and West Ham United, the former reported to be in the region of £20 million. Neymar remained at Santos, but said a year later that it was a "dream" of his "to play in Europe", while also stating that at the time it had been the right decision to stay in Brazil.

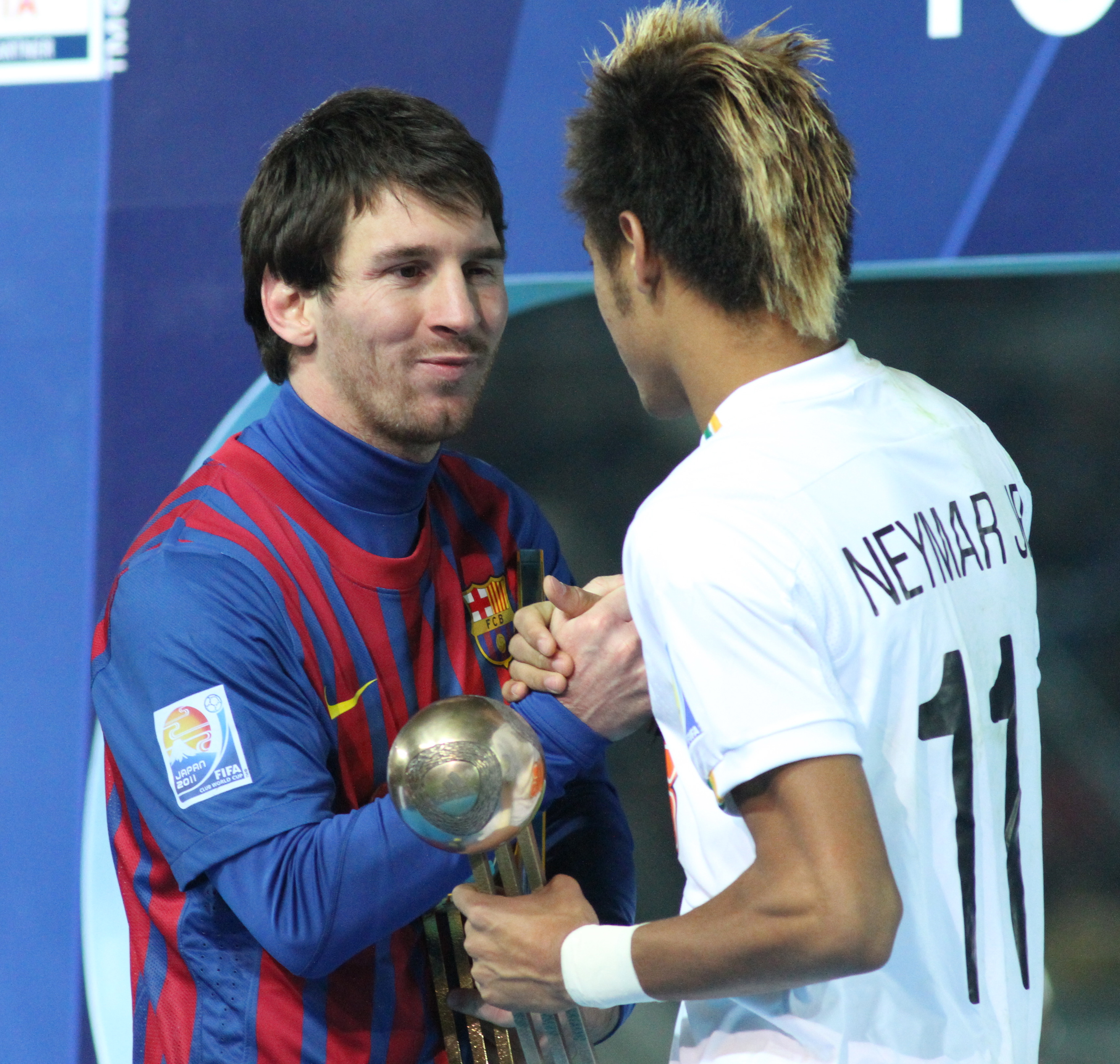
Neymar and Lionel Messi greeting each other after the 2011 FIFA Club World Cup final

Neymar scored crucial goals during the 2011 season, including the winning goal in the second leg of the finals against Corinthians to help his club clinch back-to-back state titles. He scored six goals during Santos' run to the 2011 Copa Libertadores finals, including the opening goal in the second leg of the final against Uruguayan side Peñarol, where Santos won 2–1. This was the club's first Copa Libertadores title since the "Pelé era" in the 1960s. Neymar was awarded Man of the Match and named the tournament's Best Player. On 27 July 2011, he scored a spectacular solo dribble in a thrilling 5–4 loss against Ronaldinho's Flamengo that went on to be awarded the 2011 FIFA Puskás Award. Later in the same year, he signed a contract extension until after the 2014 FIFA World Cup, reportedly increasing his wages by 50%, shunning off interest from top European clubs, including Real Madrid.

On 14 December, Neymar scored the opening goal from 20 meters for Santos as they defeated Kashiwa Reysol 3–1 in the semi-final of the FIFA Club World Cup in Toyota, Japan. In the final on 18 December against Barcelona, Neymar made a very small impact and Santos were defeated 4–0. He was awarded the tournament's Bronze Ball as the third-best player, behind Messi and Xavi. On 31 December, he won the 2011 South American Footballer of the Year award for the first time, by a record margin. In a UOL survey of 100 Campeonato Brasileiro Série A players, Neymar was voted the best player in Brazil, earning 89% of the votes.

==== 2012–13: Continued individual dominance and final season ====
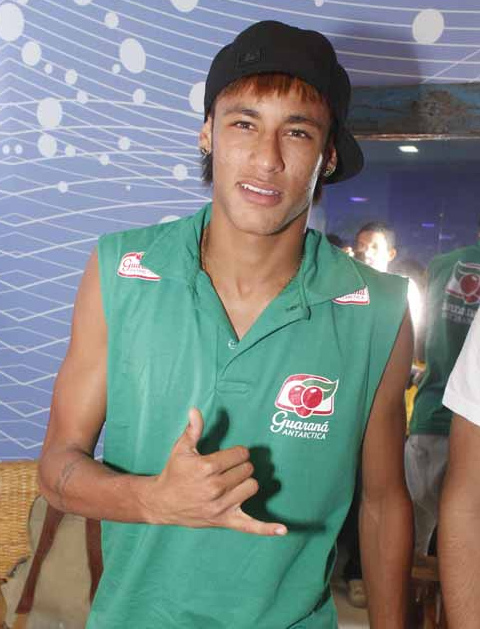
Neymar (pictured in 2012) was awarded the South American Footballer of the Year for the second consecutive time.

The 2012 season was arguably Neymar's finest with Santos. Early in the year, at 19 years old, Neymar finished 10th in the 2011 FIFA Ballon d'Or rankings. This was an unprecedented feat for a non-European club player. On 5 February 2012, when he turned 20, he scored his 100th goal as a professional football player, against Palmeiras in the Campeonato Paulista. On 25 February, he scored two goals, one of which was from 25-yards, and created two assists to help his side to a 6–1 win over Ponte Preta. On 7 March, Neymar netted a hat-trick as Santos saw off Brazilian rivals Internacional with a 3–1 win in the Copa Libertadores group stage. In the fixture against São Paulo on 29 April, he scored a hat-trick with the match ending 3–1.

In the 2012 Campeonato Paulista finals against Guarani, Neymar scored twice in the first and second legs, which ended 7–2 on aggregate to crown Santos champions. He finished the 2012 Campeonato Paulista with 20 goals and was voted the Best Player and Best Forward. He also finished as joint top scorer in the Copa Libertadores with eight goals, where Santos were eliminated by eventual champions Corinthians in the semi-finals. He was voted the Best Player of the 2012 Recopa Sudamericana, which Santos won.

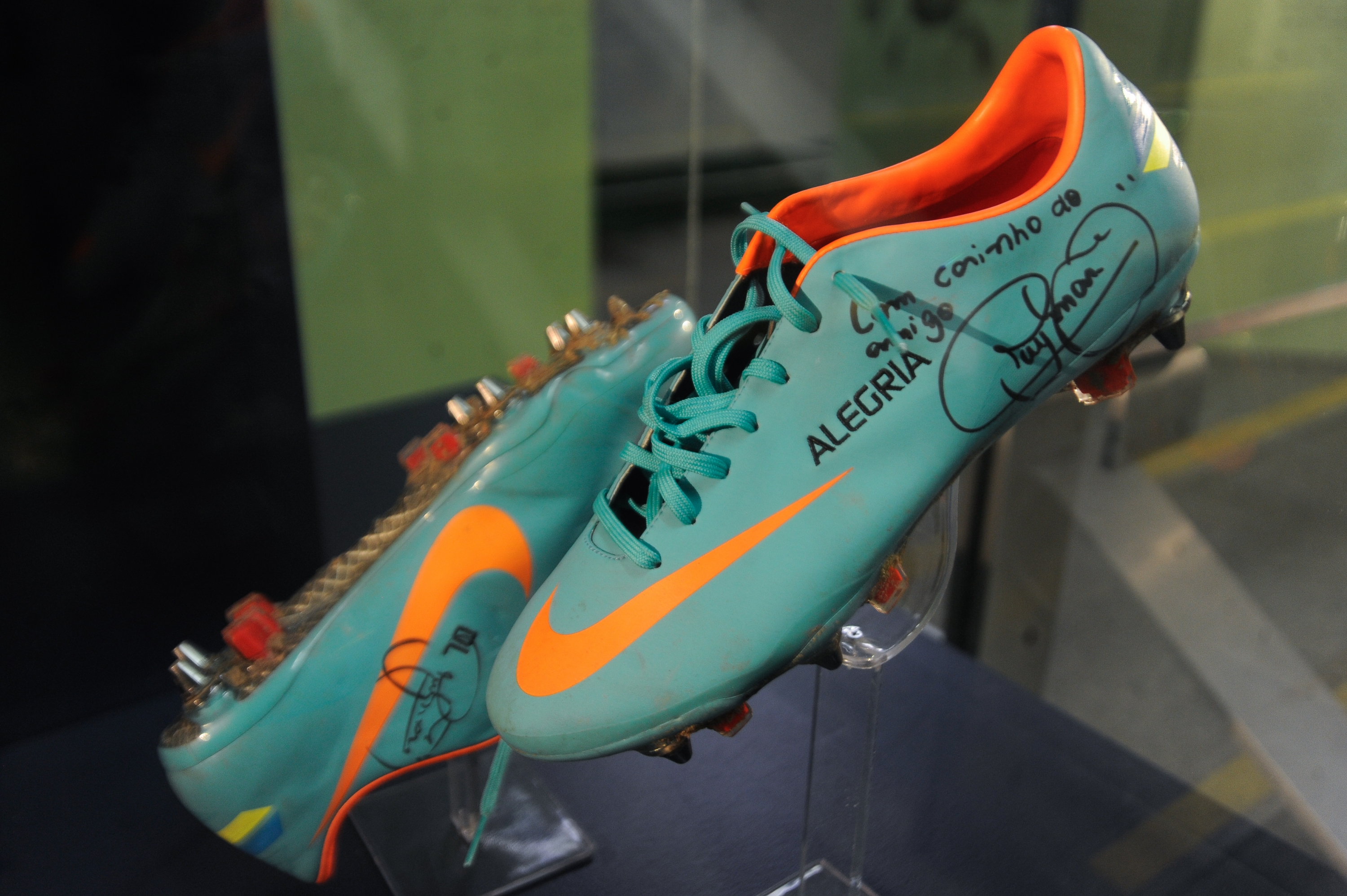
Neymar's autographed boots from the 2013 season on display at an exhibition

On 25 August 2012, he scored a brace in the 2–1 away win at Palmeiras. On 3 November, in the league fixture away at Cruzeiro, Neymar scored a hat-trick and assisted Felipe Anderson's goal, to help his side to a 4–0 win. Neymar finished off the 2012 season in style, first setting-up Victor Andrade's equaliser, then scoring twice, to give Santos a 3–1 home win over Palmeiras on 1 December. Neymar finished the 2012 season with 43 goals in just 47 matches. He won the 2012 South American Footballer of the Year, retaining his award. Pelé claimed that Neymar is the best player in the world; former Argentine player Diego Maradona responded to this: "Maybe Neymar is the best player in the world, but only if you say that Messi is from a different planet." At this point in his career, Neymar was touted to emulate Messi — or even surpass him.

Neymar started the 2013 Campeonato Paulista scoring twice in the first match, which ended in a 3–1 win over São Bernardo on 19 January 2013. On 3 February, in the Paulista fixture against São Paulo, Santos won 3–1 with Neymar scoring and making two assists. Often compared to Pelé early in his career, he appeared on the cover of Time magazine with the title 'The Next Pelé' in February 2013. He scored all four goals as Santos beat União Barbarense 4–0 in the Paulista on 13 April. On 25 April, his agent and father revealed that Neymar intended to leave for Europe before the 2014 World Cup. Neymar said the month prior that he had a "dream of playing in Europe, for a big club like Barcelona, Real Madrid and Chelsea." Ahead of his last match for Santos, on 26 May against Flamengo in the first round of the 2013 Brazilian Championship, Neymar was in tears during the national anthem, with the match ending in a draw.

In 2021, UOL included Neymar in their ranking of the 'Top 5 Greatest Players in the History of Santos'.

=== Barcelona ===
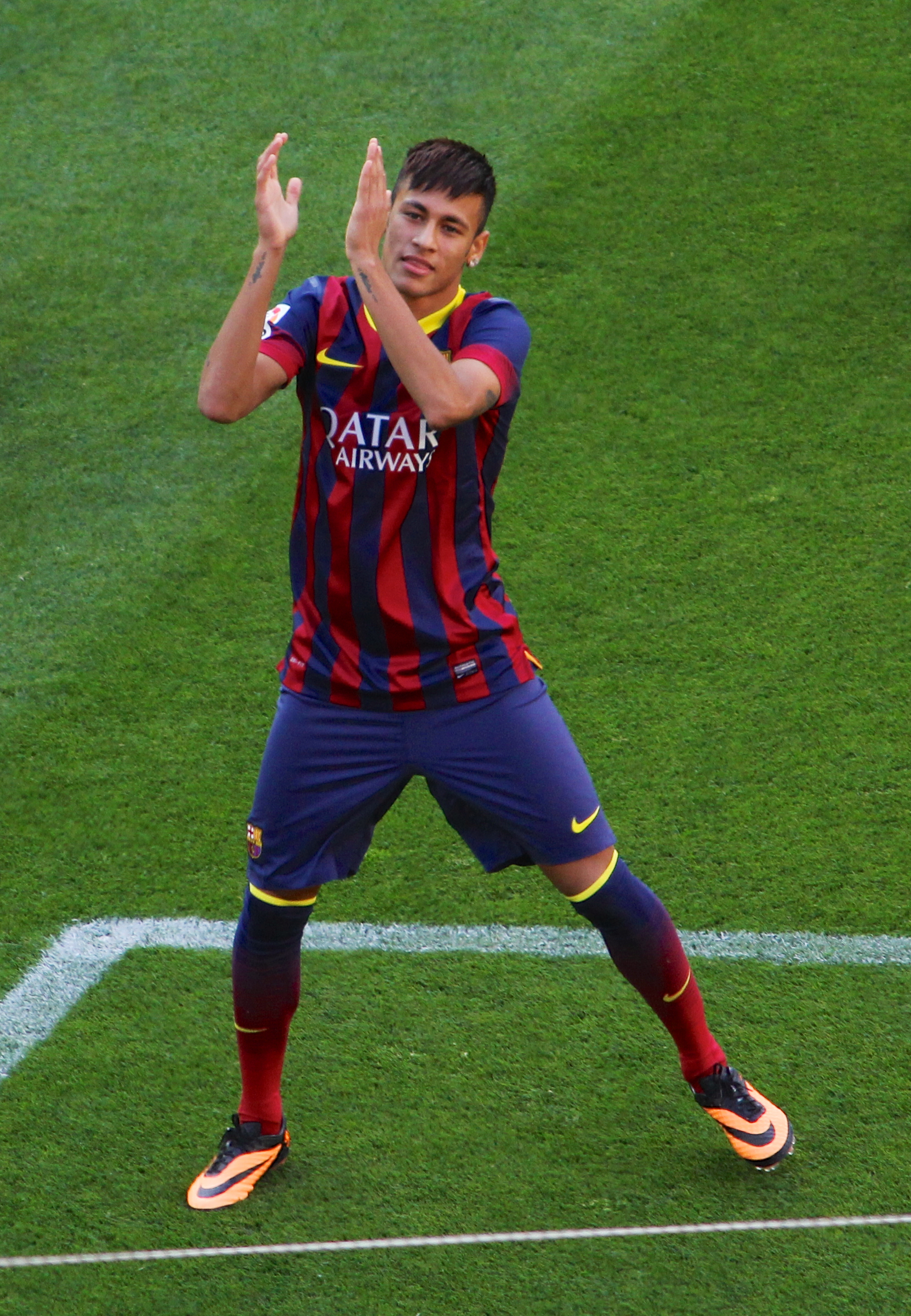
Neymar during his presentation as a Barcelona player on 3 June 2013

On 24 May 2013, Santos announced that they had received two offers for Neymar. The following day, Neymar announced he would sign with Barcelona on 27 May and join the team after playing in the 2013 FIFA Confederations Cup. Neither Neymar nor the clubs released details on the transfer fee or personal terms, save to say he signed a five-year deal. On 3 June, Neymar was unveiled by Barcelona after passing medical tests and signing a contract that would keep him at the club through June 2018.

Neymar was presented at the Camp Nou in front of 56,500 fans, a record turnout for a Brazilian player. Club vice-president Josep Maria Bartomeu initially said Neymar's transfer fee was €57.1 million and his release clause set at €190 million. Barcelona's doctor suggested he might need to gain weight to be able to cope physically in Spanish football.

==== Transfer investigation ====
In January 2014, the prosecutor's office in Madrid began investigating the transfer fee that Barcelona paid for Neymar. The documents submitted to the authorities on request contained contradictory information. On 23 January 2014, Sandro Rosell resigned from his position as president. A day later, the details of the transfer were revealed by Barcelona; the transfer had in fact cost them €86.2 million (£71.5 million), with Neymar's parents confirmed to have received a €40 million sum. In the aftermath, Barcelona and Bartomeu were charged with tax fraud.

==== 2013–14: Settling into Spain ====
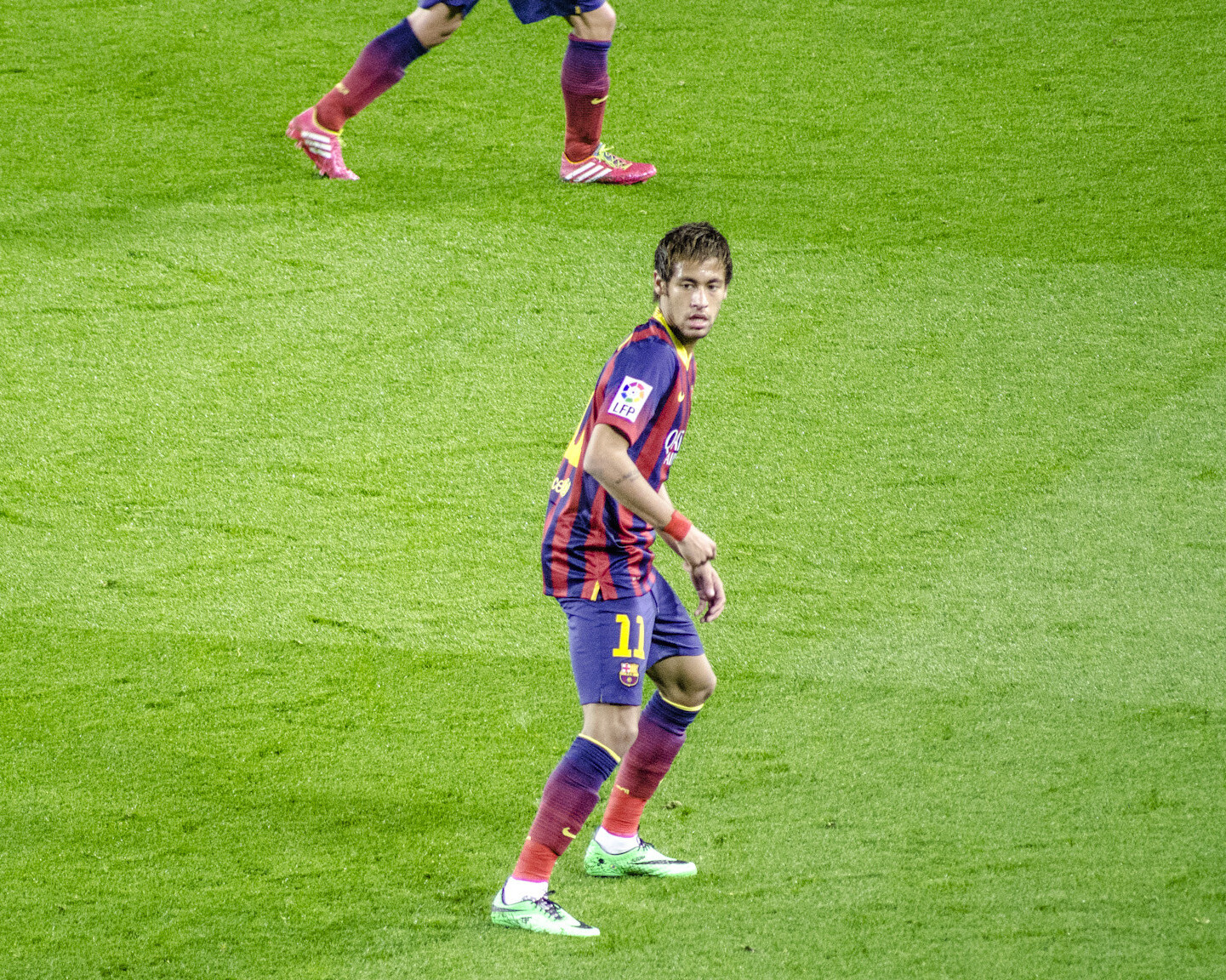
Neymar playing in a La Liga fixture against Almería in March 2014

Neymar made his official debut for Barcelona during the opening game of the 2013–14 La Liga season as a 63rd-minute substitute for Alexis Sánchez in a 7–0 win against Levante. On 21 August, he played in the 2013 Supercopa de España against Copa del Rey holders Atlético Madrid; he made an immediate impact, scoring Barcelona's only goal as they won the Supercopa on away goals.

On 18 September, he made his UEFA Champions League debut, assisting a Gerard Piqué goal as Barça beat Ajax 4–0 in their opening match of the 2013–14 tournament. Six days later, Neymar scored his first goal in La Liga in Barcelona's 4–1 defeat of Real Sociedad at Camp Nou. On 26 October, in his first El Clásico appearance, he scored the opening goal and assisted the team's winning goal in a 2–1 win over Real Madrid. On 11 December, he scored a hat-trick in a 6–1 win over Celtic in the group stage. A few days later, on 14 December, Neymar scored both of Barcelona's goals in their 2–1 win against Villarreal.

15 games into the La Liga season, Neymar had produced a respectable four goals and eight assists, nailing down the left-wing position in the Barcelona team. However, Neymar felt low, expressing in an interview over a decade later: "I spent the first 6 months at Barça with butterflies in my stomach". On 26 March 2014, Neymar scored twice in a 3–0 win against Celta Vigo. On 1 April, he scored in the Champions League quarter-final first leg against Atlético Madrid to level the match 1–1, though Atlético defeated Barcelona 1–0 in the second leg to eliminate them. On 16 April, Neymar played in the 2014 Copa del Rey final against Real Madrid, which Barcelona lost. He featured heavily in his debut season with Barcelona, ending the campaign with 15 goals in 41 appearances. At the end of the year, Eurosport ranked Neymar as the best under-23 player in the world, ahead of the likes of Paul Pogba and Mario Götze.

==== 2014–15: MSN trio and continental treble ====
The 2014–15 season notably marked the birth of the new attacking trio of Lionel Messi, new signing Luis Suárez and Neymar — dubbed MSN. A sports writer noted that Neymar's understanding with Messi, in comparison to the previous season, was "close to telepathic at times", and the addition of Suárez's "tenacity and hunger" resulted in "possibly the most formidable strike-force in European football".

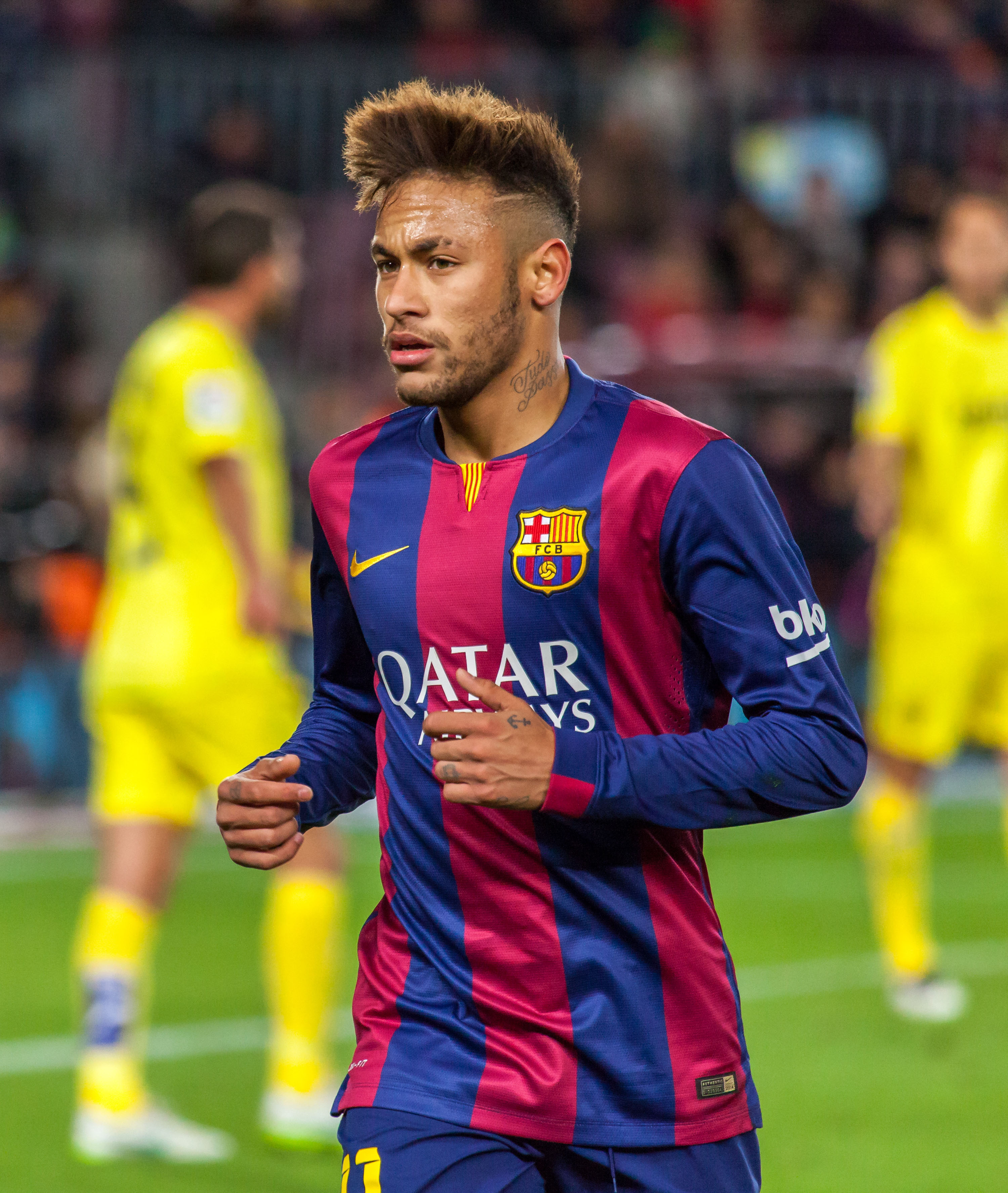
Neymar during a La Liga match against Villarreal in February 2015

On 13 September, Neymar scored both of Barcelona's goals in their 2–0 win against Athletic Bilbao in La Liga. Two weeks later, he scored a hat-trick against Granada in a 6–0 win on 27 September. On 24 January 2015, Neymar scored twice and assisted a goal in a 6–0 win at Elche. He continued to deliver for Barcelona, scoring twice in the Copa del Rey round of 16, twice in the quarter-final and twice in the semi-final to reach the final. After defeating Atlético Madrid 1–0 to secure the league title on 17 May, Barcelona defeated Athletic Bilbao 3–1 at Camp Nou in the 2015 Copa del Rey final on 30 May, with Neymar scoring the club's second goal to tie him as the competition's top goalscorer with 7.

Neymar was vital for Barcelona in the Champions League, scoring six goals in the knock out stages against Paris Saint-Germain (PSG) and Bayern Munich as Barcelona proceeded to the 2015 Champions League final on 6 June. In the final, Neymar scored the third goal for Barcelona in the 3–1 defeat of Italian champions Juventus at Berlin's Olympiastadion, ensuring the club won its fifth Champions League title and become the first club in history to win the treble twice. Neymar became one of the few players to win both the Copa Libertadores and the Champions League, and the first player to score in both quarter-final matches, both semi-final matches and the final of the Champions League.

Neymar ended the season with 39 goals in all competitions, including 10 in the Champions League, making him the joint top scorer with Ronaldo and teammate Messi in the latter competition. He was the first player apart from those two to top the competition's scoring list since compatriot Kaká in 2006–07. Barcelona's attacking trio, MSN, ended the season with a combined 122 goals, the most in a season for an attacking trio in Spanish football history. France Football ranked Neymar as the best under-23 player in the world and included him in their World XI.

==== 2015–17: Ballon d'Or candidate, domestic double and final season ====
In the 2015–16 season, on 12 September, Neymar scored a near-immediate equaliser against Atlético Madrid in La Liga before Barcelona went on to win the match 2–1. In late September, Messi suffered a serious knee injury in the league, keeping him out for two months. In Messi's absence, Neymar experienced one of the greatest peaks in his career, scoring 13 goals and providing 9 assists in just 8 games. His run included a four goal display in Barcelona's 5–2 home win in the league over Rayo Vallecano; a two goal display in a 3–0 win against BATE Borisov in the Champions League groupstage; two goals in a 3–0 win against Villarreal, including a "stunning" goal where he received the ball from just inside the area and flicked it up over his shoulder and over a defender before volleying it into the goal; two goals in a 4–0 victory against Real Sociedad; and a goal alongside an assist in Barcelona's 4–0 away win against Real Madrid. Villarreal manager Marcelino lauded Neymar as "probably the most in-form attacker in the league, decisive in front of goal and also in their [buildup] play". Neymar was named the La Liga Player of the Month for November, which made him the first Barcelona player to receive the award since it was inaugurated in September 2013. In December, he featured in the 2015 FIFA Club World Cup, delivering two assists in Barcelona's 3–0 win against River Plate in the final on 20 December.

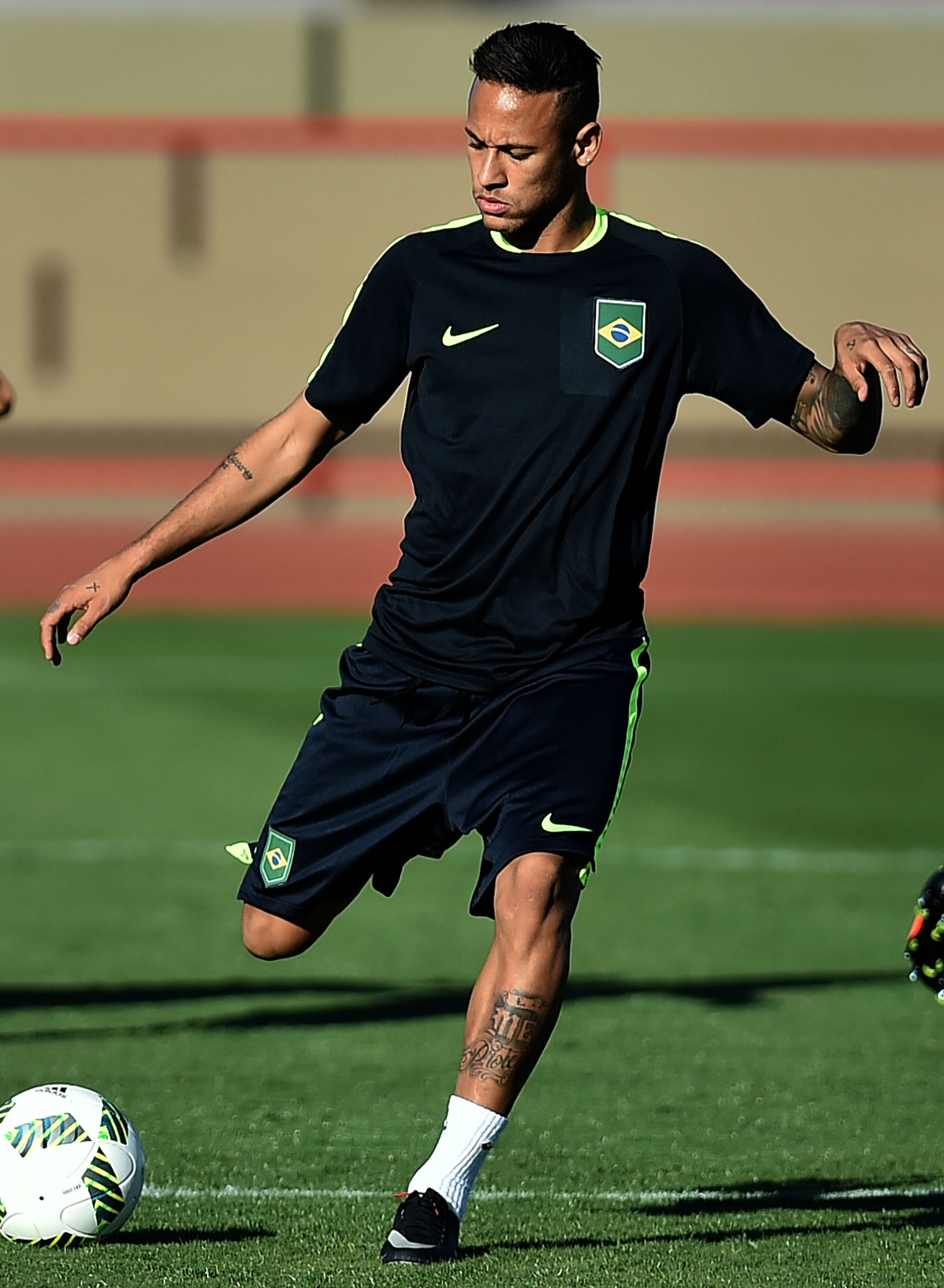
Neymar training with the Brazil under-23 in August 2016, soon after his contract extension with Barcelona

At 23 years old, Neymar was being praised for elevating to the same level of Messi and Ronaldo, possibly entering the best player in the world debate. He was shortlisted for the 2015 FIFA Ballon d'Or alongside Messi and Ronaldo. Several journalists argued that he deserved to win the award, particularly for his crucial performances in the knockout stages of the 2014–15 Champions League and during Messi's absence during the first half of 2015–16. He came in third place, receiving 7.86 percent of the vote. Both L'Équipe and Sky Sports ranked Neymar as the second-best player in the world of 2015, only behind Messi.

In the quarter-final of the Copa del Rey in January 2016, Neymar scored twice in Barcelona's 5–2 aggregate win over Athletic Bilbao. On 12 March, in a 6–0 win, he scored twice against Getafe in the league. Neymar had another successful La Liga campaign, being directly involved in 40 goals (24 goals and 16 assists) as Barcelona won the title, finishing just one point ahead of Real Madrid. He also won eight penalties for Barcelona, more than any other player in the league. He was included in The Guardian's La Liga Team of the Season. On 22 May, he scored in Barcelona's 2–0 win against Sevilla in the 2016 Copa del Rey final, celebrating a domestic double triumph.

The front three of Messi, Suárez and Neymar finished the season with 131 goals, breaking the record they had set the previous year for most goals by an attacking trio in a single season. Despite a dip in form at the end of the season, Neymar ultimately reached over 30 goals for the second consecutive season, scoring 31, as well as 27 assists. For the second consecutive year, Sky Sports ranked him at number two in their 2016 Top 100 Players of the Year list.

On 1 July 2016, Neymar signed a new contract with Barcelona until 2021. His new contract included a €200 million buy-out clause, rising to €222m in the second year of his deal, and €250m thereafter. His future at Barcelona had been in doubt over rumours that the likes of PSG, Real Madrid and Manchester City were considering to make huge offers for him.

On 12 September of the 2016–17 season, Neymar registered a goal and four assists in Barcelona's 7–0 win against Celtic in the group stage of the Champions League. In an away fixture in La Liga against Sporting Gijón on 24 September, he scored twice in a 5–0 win. On 19 January 2017, he scored his club's only goal in a 1–0 win in the first leg of the Copa del Rey quarter-final against Real Sociedad, converting from the penalty spot. Neymar's form drastically dipped, having scored just five goals in La Liga by February. ESPN said that Neymar looked "rusty in front of goal". While tiredness was cited as an explanation, sections of the media instead attributed his decline to the aggressive treatment he received from oppositions, with Mundo Deportivo describing him as "the most hunted player in La Liga".

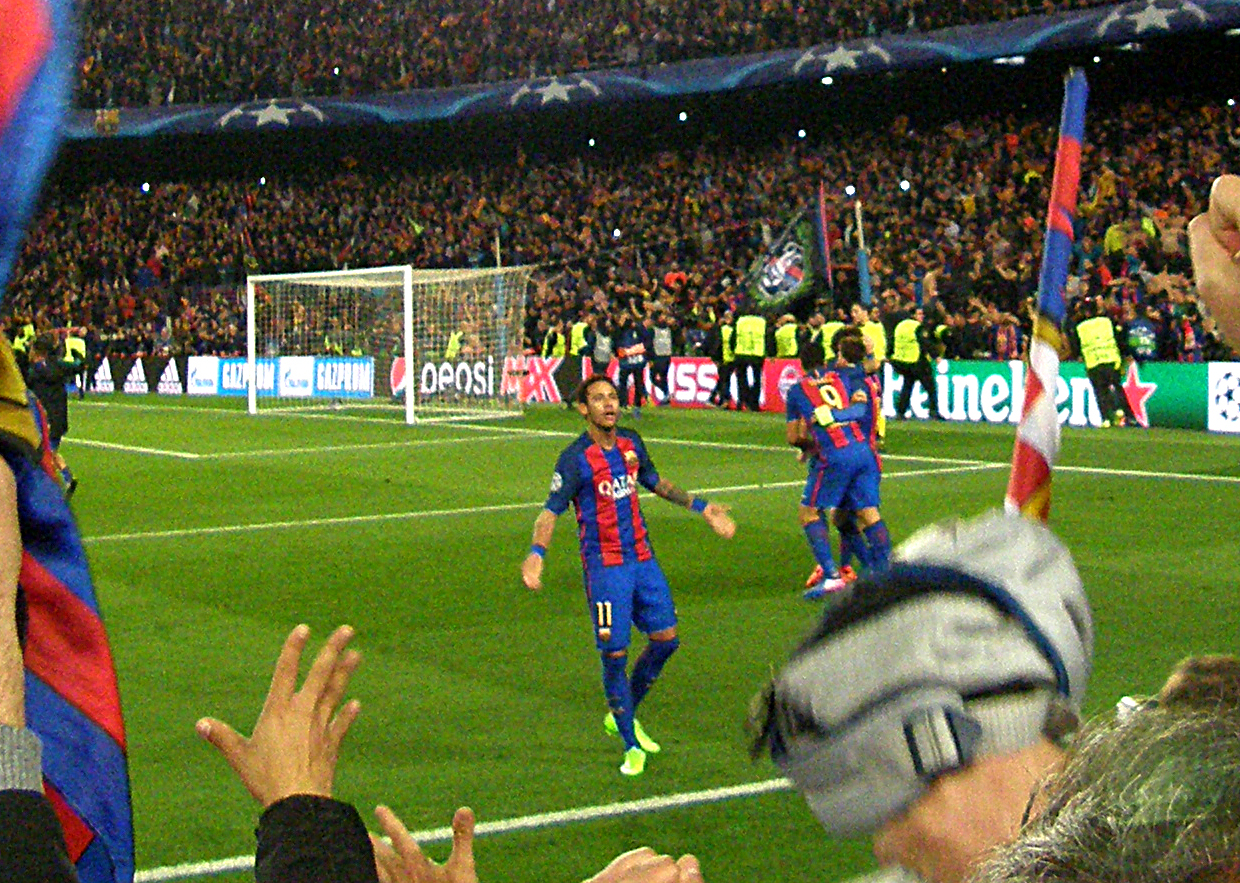
Neymar celebrating after Barcelona's sixth goal against PSG in the UEFA Champions League second leg win in March 2017

Neymar was pivotal in Barcelona's 6–1 victory (widely known as La Remontada English translation: The Comeback) over PSG in the Champions League round of 16 on 8 March, overcoming the 4–0 loss in the first leg. It is widely regarded as the greatest comeback in football history. Barcelona were 5–3 down on aggregate in the 88th minute, but scored three goals in the final seven minutes to progress into the quarter-final — Neymar contributed to all three goals, scoring twice and providing an assist in the 95th minute. A sports writer said that Neymar's performance cemented his legacy as the third-best player of his generation, behind Messi and Ronaldo. PSG's midfielder Marco Verratti later said, "If I could sign one player for PSG it would be Neymar [...] He is at the same level as Messi."

On 15 May, Neymar scored his first away hat-trick for Barcelona in a 4–1 victory against Las Palmas, ensuring that Barcelona were still in the La Liga title race, but Real Madrid ultimately won the title on 20 May. On 27 May, he scored his 105th, and final, goal for Barcelona in the 2017 Copa del Rey final, as Barcelona defeated Alavés 3–1. This made him the first player to score in three consecutive Copa del Rey finals since Ferenc Puskás in the 1960s. Despite being less prolific than his previous two seasons, prominent journalist Guillem Balagué credited Neymar for being more of a provider and for maturing his game. In Balagué's view, Neymar was "now second only to Messi as the best player in the world." According to WhoScored, which is powered by Opta Sports data, Neymar was Europe's best-performing player during the season.

By July 2017, media speculation emerged that Neymar wanted to leave Barcelona for PSG, who he had been "close to joining" the previous year according to his agent Wagner Ribeiro. Neymar was driven to join PSG as he wanted a new challenge and to play with several of his Brazil national team teammates who were at the club, including new signing Dani Alves. On 2 August, Neymar asked Barcelona to allow him to leave. Barcelona president, Bartomeu, admitted he was powerless to stop him from wanting to leave. In the short time that Neymar was at Barcelona, he was a "crucial piece" to the club's success in those years, scoring 105 goals and assisting 76 in 186 appearances. Sports Illustrated said that he arguably eclipsed Ronaldo as the second-best player in the world during his final three seasons at Barcelona.

=== Paris Saint-Germain ===
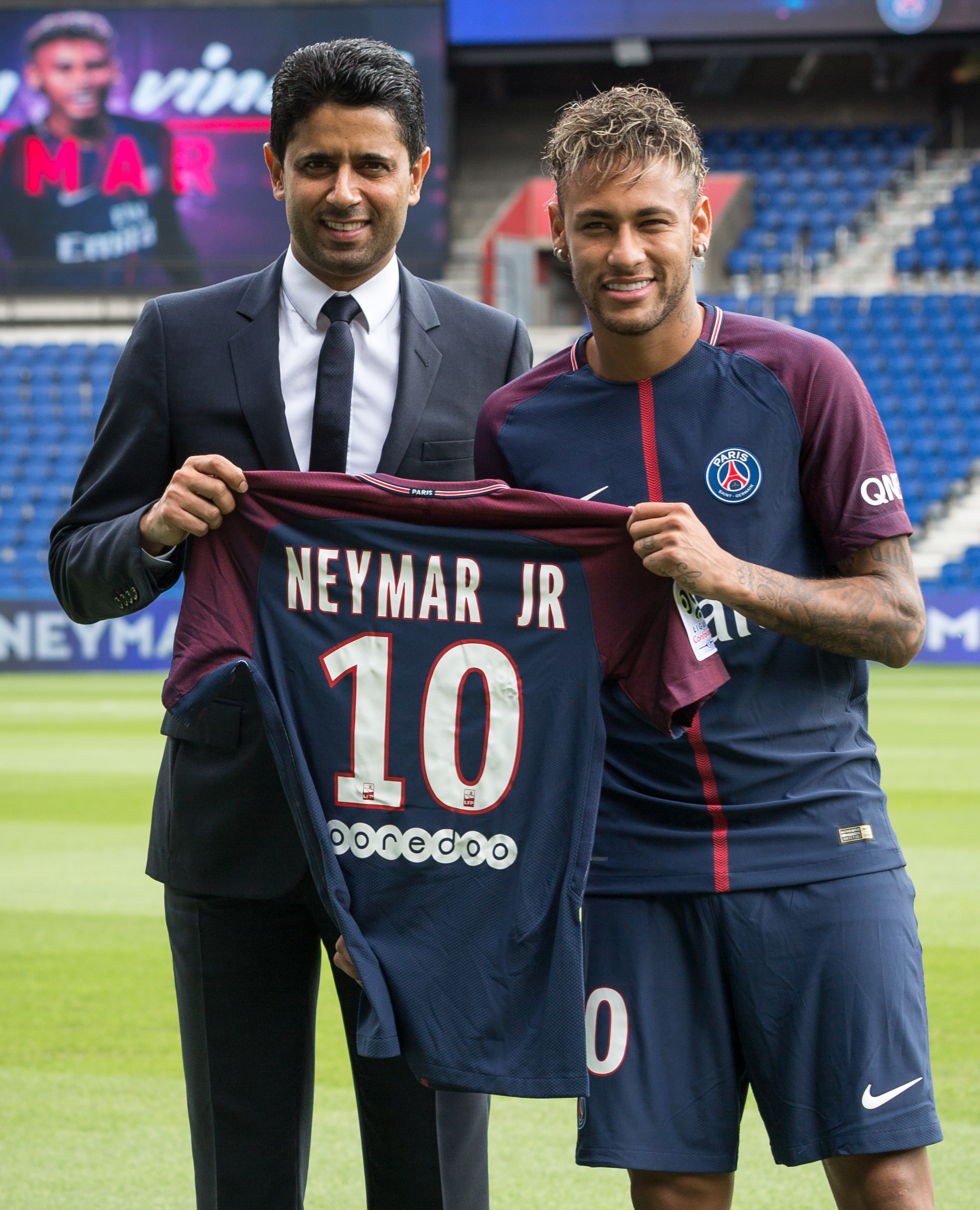
Neymar posing with his PSG number 10 jersey alongside club president Nasser Al-Khelaifi

On 3 August 2017, Barcelona announced that Neymar's legal representatives made a payment of €222 million to the club, equal to the release clause of his contract, which constituted the most expensive transfer ever. The situation was unusual, in that the fee was paid to the club directly, after La Liga had refused to receive the payment — citing violation of Financial Fair Play (FFP) rules by PSG.

Neymar's unexpected departure from Barcelona and the record-breaking transfer fee made global headlines, with some in the media labelling it as "the signing of the century". He joined PSG on a contract that would run until 2022, earning roughly €36 million a year — one of the largest sports contracts — to make him the second-highest paid player in the world. This was a €12 million increase from his salary at Barcelona.

As the club's main player, Neymar was touted to lead PSG to their first Champions League title. He was given the number 10 shirt by the club's midfielder Javier Pastore as a "welcome gift". The Eiffel Tower celebrated the arrival of Neymar by displaying his name and the red and blue colours of PSG.

According to Goal, the relationship between Neymar and Barcelona fans was tainted following his move to PSG. In his presentation on 17 August, he said that leaving Barcelona was one of the toughest decisions in his life. He joined a growing list of Brazilian players who had signed for PSG in previous years, including Thiago Silva, Lucas Moura and David Luiz.

==== Contract breach lawsuit ====
On 27 August 2017, Barcelona filed a lawsuit against Neymar, demanding he return the contract-renewal bonus he'd received as well as €8.5 million in damages and an additional 10% in arrears. The club claimed the money is owed on the basis of the renewal of the contract they signed in 2016. The club also requested PSG to take on the financial responsibility for the payment of the fees if the player is shown unable to do so. Neymar's lawyers announced that they would contest the case, but on 19 June 2020, a Spanish court ruled that Neymar must return $7.5 million (€6.7 million) to Barcelona. In 2021, the club and the player announced they've reached an "amicable" out-of-court settlement, whose details were not publicly divulged.

==== 2017–19: PSG's talisman, domestic success and injuries ====
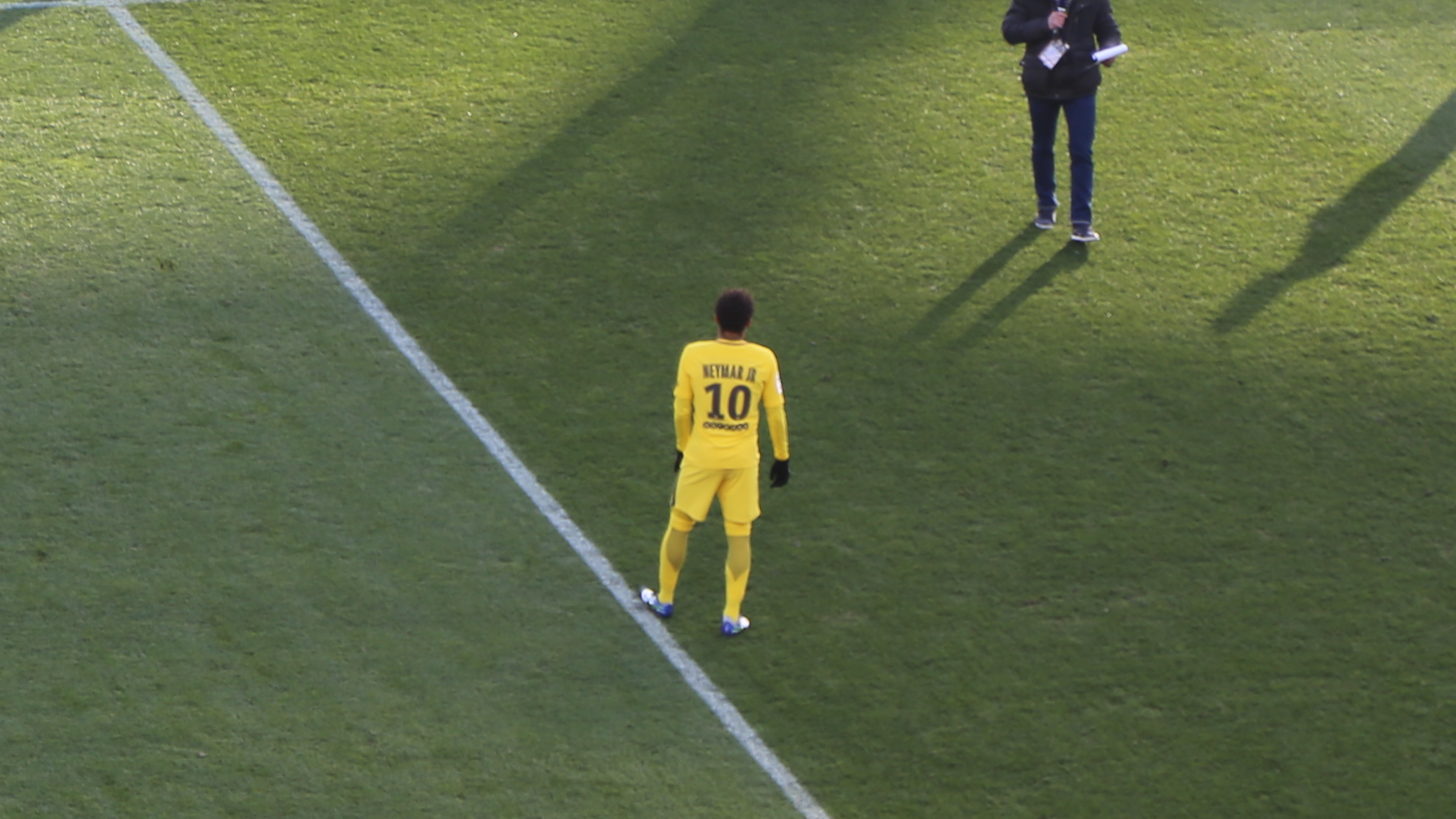
Neymar ahead of a Ligue 1 fixture against Toulouse in February 2018

Neymar made his debut for PSG on 13 August 2017, scoring a goal and assisting another in a 3–0 away victory over Guingamp in the league. Guingamp's defender Lucas Deaux said "I have never seen a player like this before". In the next fixture on 20 August against Toulouse, Neymar contributed with two goals and two assists to help PSG win 6–2. On 30 September, Neymar scored twice in another 6–2 win as PSG defeated Bordeaux. On 22 October, he scored against rivals Marseille in his first Le Classique in a 2–2 result, but was sent off — the first time in his PSG career. On 16 December, Neymar scored twice and assisted twice to help PSG defeat Rennes 4–1. As the talisman at PSG, Neymar had immediately established himself as the club's most influential player, enjoying more freedom than he had at Barcelona.

In the Champions League group stage, Neymar scored six goals in six games against Celtic, Bayern Munich and Anderlecht as PSG topped their group table. The club had also set a new record for most goals in the group stage, with 25 goals. 16 of the club's goals were scored by the new attacking trio of Neymar, Edinson Cavani and Kylian Mbappé, turning PSG into a serious contender in the competition. In December, the CIES Football Observatory produced a team of the best performing players in Europe since the start of the season; Neymar was included alongside his fellow PSG teammates Verratti and Alves. He was also included in the FIFA FIFPRO World 11 for the second time in his career. In the 2017 Ballon d'Or, he came in third place, with only Messi and Ronaldo finishing ahead of him. He received 12.88% of the vote.

On 7 January 2018, Neymar scored twice in his first Coupe de France match as his side defeated Rennes 6–1 to progress to the round of 32. On 17 January, he displayed one of his greatest career performances, scoring four goals and assisting two in an 8–0 thrashing of Dijon in the league, including an excellent solo goal starting from the byline. He became one of the few players to earn a 10 rating from L'Équipe. By the end of January, Neymar was considered the most in-form player in Europe, having been involved in 40 of PSG's goals (24 goals and 16 assists). On 14 February, he featured in his first Champions League knock out game for PSG, delivering a "clever" back-heel pass to assist the opening goal against Real Madrid in the round of 16 first leg, though they went on to lose 3–1.

Neymar's 2017–18 season ended in late February 2018 after suffering a metatarsal injury in his right foot in a league fixture against Marseille, causing him to miss PSG's crucial second leg tie against Real Madrid in the Champions League, who ultimately eliminated them. He scored 28 goals in 30 matches, helping his new club win the domestic treble of the Ligue 1, Coupe de France, and Coupe de la Ligue. He was particularly the driving force to PSG retrieving the Ligue 1 title following Monaco's triumph in the previous season, being rewarded with the Ligue 1 Player of the Year.

Neymar was included in the ESM Team of the Year for the first time, and for the second consecutive season was recognised as the best-performing player in Europe according to WhoScored, recording the highest ever rating for a single season in one of Europe's top five leagues up to that point. WhoScored also included him in their European Team of the Season for the third consecutive season. (Note: Talksport released an article that includes an official image of the WhoScored's European Team of the Season for 2017–18, which includes Neymar (the highest rated player on the team), but Talksport is not allowed to be referenced.) Despite his success with PSG, Neymar finished outside of the top 10 for the 2018 Ballon d'Or (12th) for the first time since 2012, with journalists citing his cut short season with PSG and his disappointing 2018 FIFA World Cup tournament with Brazil as the reason for the low place finish.

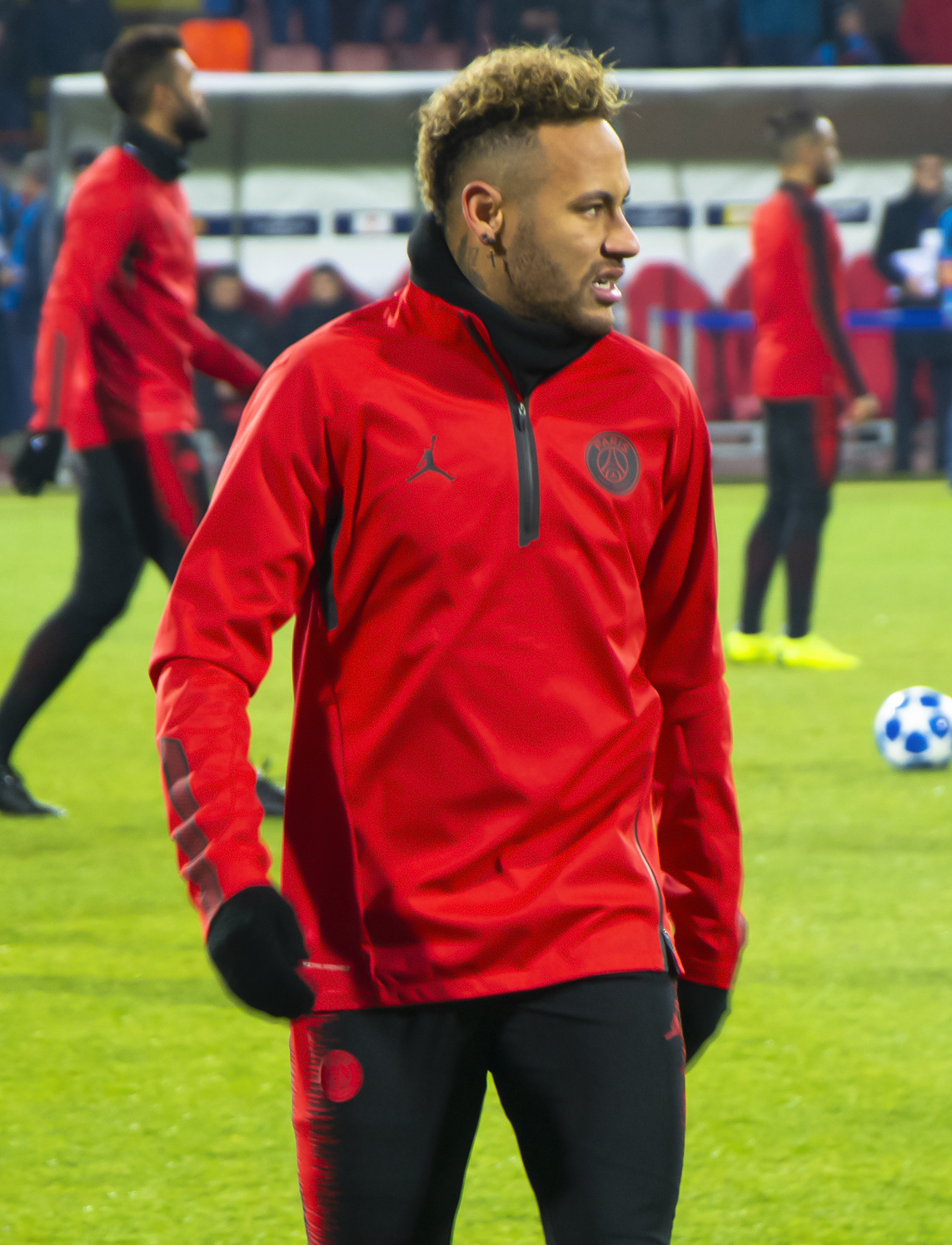
Neymar before the Champions League fixture against Red Star Belgrade in December 2018

On 12 August 2018, Neymar scored PSG's opening league goal of the 2018–19 season in a 3–0 home win over Caen. On 29 September, he scored twice in the league fixture against Nice, winning 3–0. He scored what proved to be the winning goal in a 2–1 victory over Lille on 2 November after Lille pulled one back with a late penalty. This was PSG's 12th consecutive win since the start of the Ligue 1 season, an all-time record for any team in the big five European leagues at the time.

In the Champions League group stage, Neymar helped PSG top a group that included the previous year's runners-up Liverpool, as well as Napoli and Red Star Belgrade. He scored a hattrick in a 6–1 win over Red Star Belgrade (including two free kicks) and PSG's second goal in their 2–1 win against Liverpool, which meant he surpassed Kaká's tally of 30 goals to become the top-scoring Brazilian in the Champions League with 31 goals. For the second consecutive season, Goal included Neymar in their Champions League Team of the Group Stage.

On 19 January 2019, Neymar provided two goals and an assist in PSG's 9–0 defeat of Guingamp, the club's biggest home win. On 23 January, nearly a year after his season-ending injury, Neymar reinjured the metatarsal in his right foot in PSG's win against Strasbourg in the Coupe de France. He missed the Champions League round of 16 tie against Manchester United; after United eliminated PSG, Neymar went on social media to insult video review officials for awarding a stoppage-time penalty to United, resulting in UEFA banning him for three matches in UEFA competitions for the insult.

On 27 April, Neymar returned from the foot injury to play in the 2019 Coupe de France final against Rennes, where he assisted the opening goal and scored PSG's second, but Rennes made a comeback and won on penalties. After the match, he was caught on video appearing to punch a spectator in the face, who had been filming and insulting PSG players. Although PSG had already clinched the Ligue 1 title on 21 April, Neymar continued to contribute in the league. On 4 May, he scored the equaliser from the penalty spot in a 1–1 draw with Nice. On the next matchday, 11 May, he opened the scoring with a diving header before assisting PSG's second goal in a 2–1 win against Angers. Neymar was banned for three matches for his actions in the Coupe de France final, causing him to miss the final two league games of the season and the eventual 2019 Trophée des Champions.

Despite the cup final disappointment and another injury interrupted season, Neymar trailed only Mbappé in PSG's top goalscorers of the season, with 23 goals in 28 matches. However, he was not included on the 30-man shortlist for the Ballon d'Or for the first time since 2010 due to having a "black year": injuries, including an additional injury in the summer that caused him to miss Brazil's triumph at the 2019 Copa América, and the controversies off the field. Nevertheless, at the end of the year France Football included him in their Team of the Decade for 2011–2020.

==== 2019–20: Decisive in Ligue 1, Coupe de France final winning goal and UEFA Champions League runner-up ====
In July 2019, it was revealed that Neymar wanted to leave PSG as he felt referees never protected him, there was jealousy towards him from some dressing room team-mates, fans did not appreciate his talent showcased in PSG and sections of the French media were against him. He heavily pushed for a move back to Barcelona, and was also linked with Real Madrid. He ultimately agreed to stay at PSG after talks with Barcelona broke down.

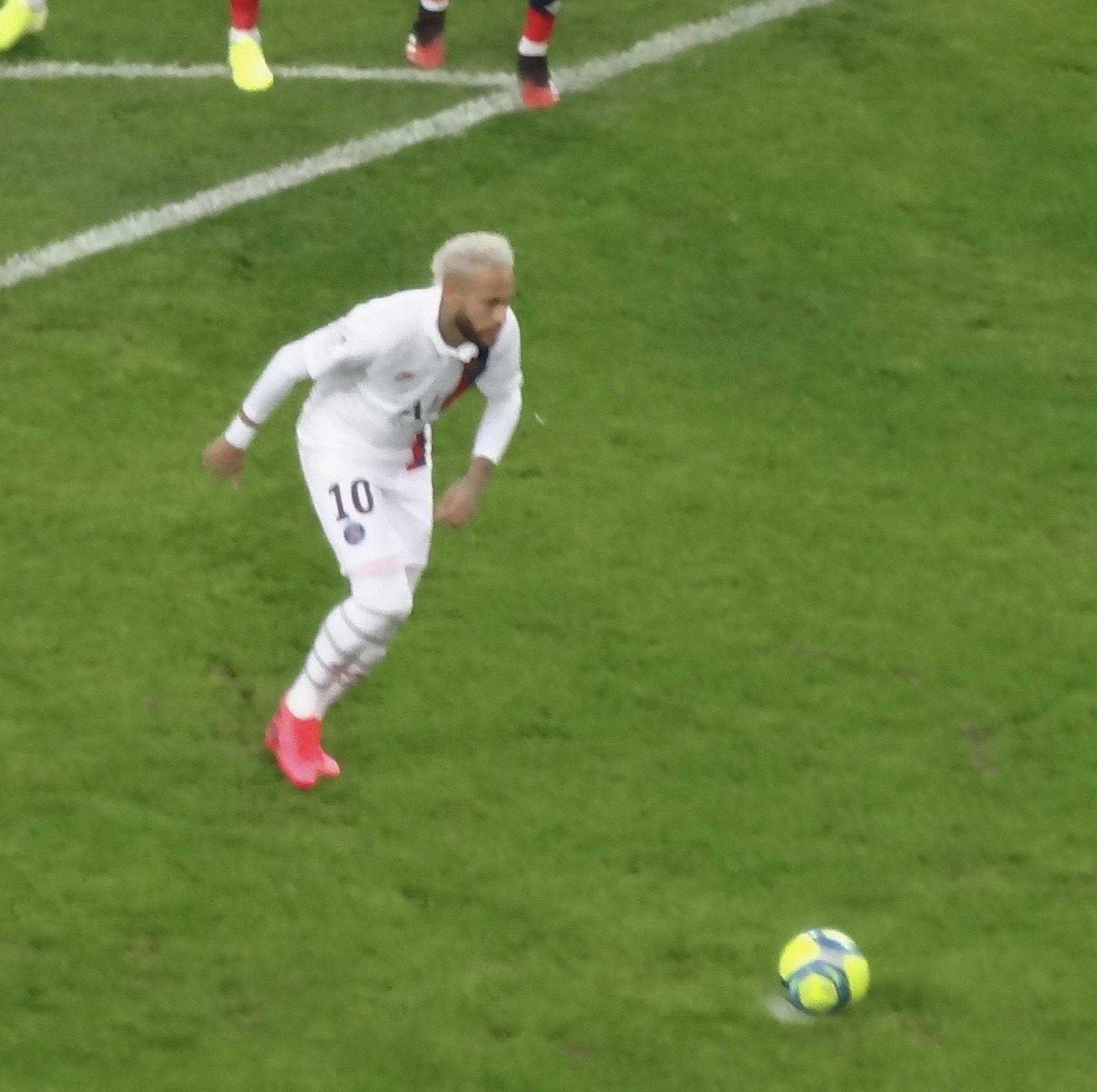
Neymar before converting his penalty against Lille in Ligue 1 in January 2020

The long drawn-out transfer speculation of Neymar returning to Barcelona caused tensions in Paris. On 14 September, Neymar's first appearance for PSG in the 2019–20 season, he was relentlessly booed throughout the match before scoring a bicycle kick in the 92nd minute to win 1–0 against Strasbourg in Ligue 1. He scored another late winner on the next matchday as PSG defeated Lyon 1–0 on 23 September. Neymar continued to be vital in Ligue 1, scoring the only goal in a win against Bordeaux, scoring and assisting in a 3–1 comeback win against Montpellier, and assisting twice and scoring in a 4–0 win against Saint-Étienne. During this period, he went on a seven-match scoring run and matched the record of Marseille's Gunnar Andersson in the early 1950s of scoring 47 goals in his first 50 matches in Ligue 1.

Entering into the new year, Neymar continued his fine form for PSG. He was at the core of all of PSG's goals against Monaco in Ligue 1 on 12 January 2020, scoring twice and causing an own goal, though the match ended in a 3–3 draw. Two weeks later, on 26 January, he scored both goals in a 2–0 win against Lille. On 4 March, Neymar converted from the penalty spot to put PSG 2–1 up against Lyon in the 2019–20 Coupe de France semi-finals; PSG went on to win 5–1. PSG won the domestic treble, with Neymar scoring the club's lone goal in the Coupe de France final on 24 July to win 1–0. Despite official Ligue 1 awards not being given by the UNFP due to the impact of the COVID-19 pandemic, Neymar was honoured by L'Équipe as the Best Player in Ligue 1 for 2019–20. He was also included in both L'Équipe's and France Football's Ligue 1 Team of the Season.

During the knockout stages of the Champions League, Neymar was hailed as "a leader", dictating play and contributing with two goals and two assists against Borussia Dortmund, Atalanta and RB Leipzig en route to PSG reaching its first ever Champions League final to face Bayern Munich on 23 August. He was praised as the best player in the world, including by former long-time Arsenal manager Arsène Wenger. In the final, PSG lost 1–0. With his ambition of guiding PSG to its first ever Champions League title, Neymar was visibly distraught at full time.

Despite another injury-hit season with PSG, 2019–20 was one of Neymar's most successful seasons of his career. He was named in the UEFA Team of the Year for the first time since the 2014–15 season and was also included in L'Équipe's world team of the year for the fourth time in his career. The Independent included him in their Champions League team of the tournament. Neymar finished second behind Robert Lewandowski in the fan vote for the 2020 The Best FIFA Men's Player award, but a lack of votes from coaches, national team captains and journalists resulted in a finish outside the top five. Eurosport also ranked Neymar second in their top 10 players of the year list behind Lewandowski.

==== 2020–21: Goalscoring records, Champions League heroics and Ligue 1 title race ====
Early in 2020–21, Neymar entered PSG's top ten goalscorers as he scored his 72nd goal for the club in a 6–1 win against Angers on October 3, in which he scored twice and assisted a goal. In November, he reached 50 goals in Ligue 1 in 58 matches, making him the fastest player in the 21st century and the third-fastest player ever to do so, surpassing the likes of forwards Zlatan Ibrahimović and Radamel Falcao. Like the previous season, he was largely influential for PSG in the Champions League, where they lost two of their opening three games in the group stage, being at risk of being eliminated. In PSG's final three games in their group, Neymar converted a penalty as his side won 1–0 over Leipzig, scored twice in their 3–1 victory against Manchester United at Old Trafford, and netted a hat-trick in their 5–1 win against İstanbul Başakşehir. His goals made him the first player in European Cup and Champions League history to reach 20 goals for two different clubs, having previously done so with Barcelona. He also became the fourth-quickest player to reach 40 goals in the Champions League (65 matches). His third goal against Başakşehir was named by UEFA as the best goal of the 2020–21 Champions League group stage.

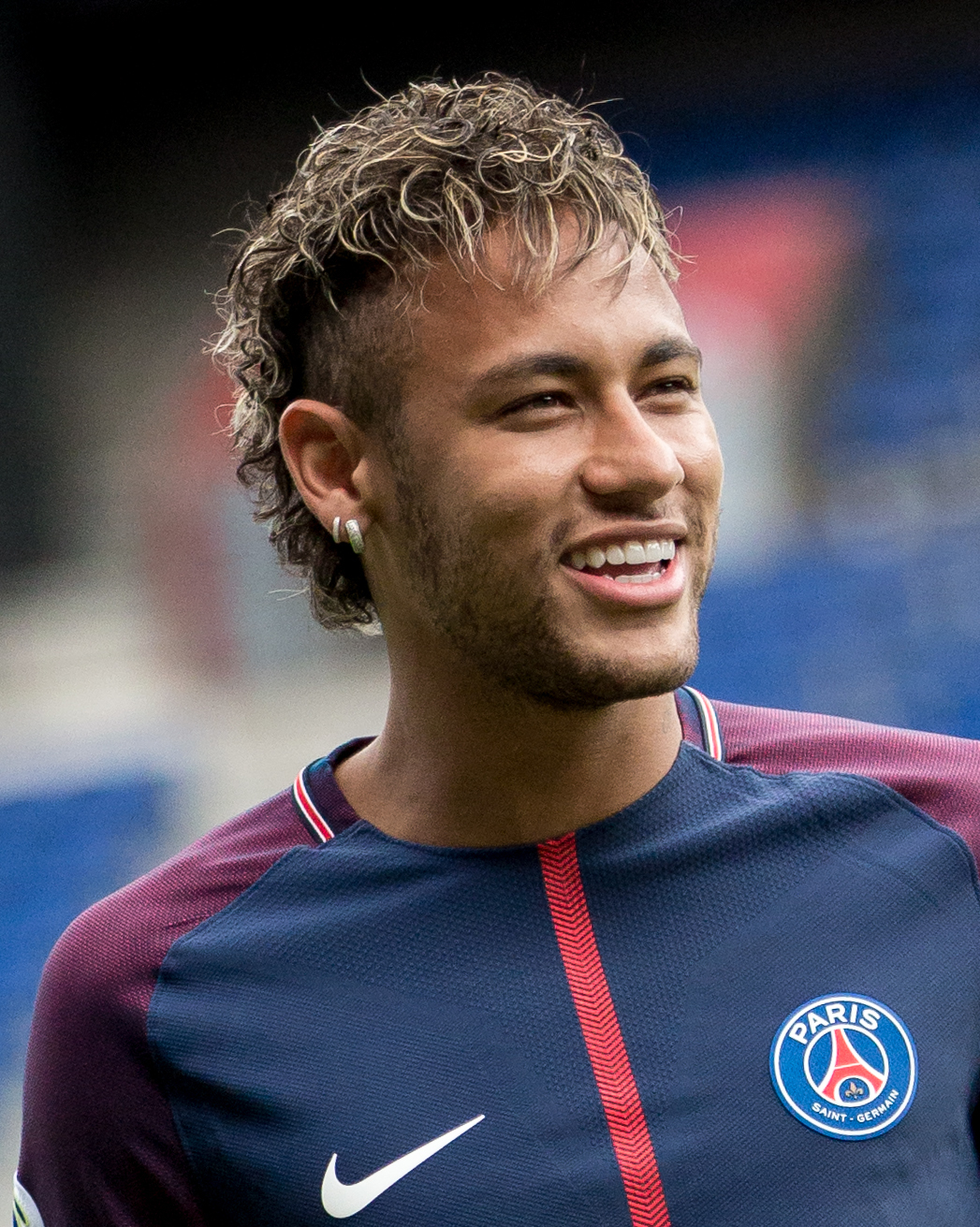
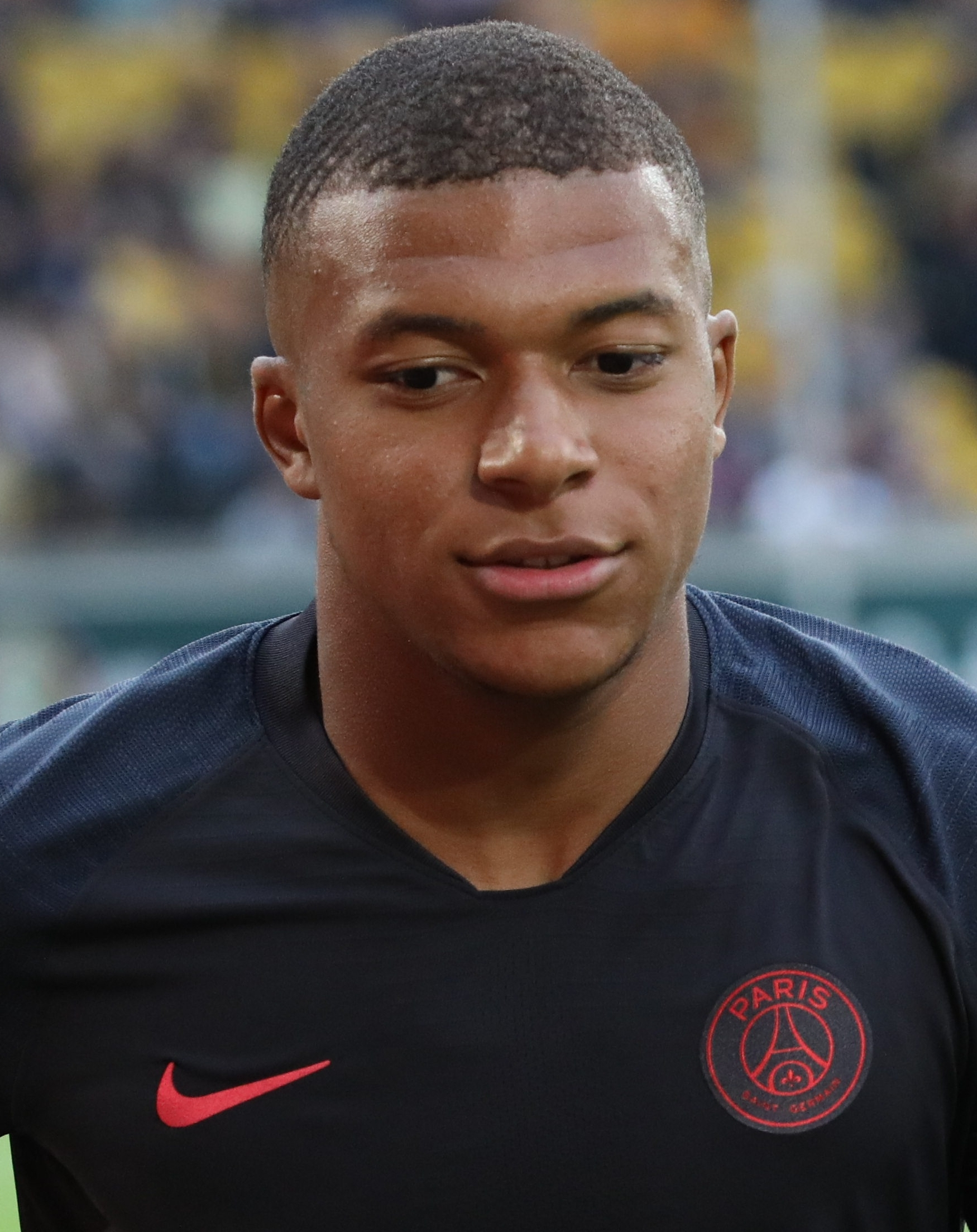
The duo of Neymar and Kylian Mbappé were influential to PSG's run to the 2020–21 Champions League semi-finals.

On 13 January 2021, Neymar scored from a penalty in PSG's 2–1 win over rivals Marseille to win the Trophée des Champions. He soon suffered his third injury of the season, causing him to miss the round of 16 tie against Barcelona in the Champions League. Neymar was available for the quarter-final victory against defending champions Bayern Munich in April, registering two assists to help PSG progress to the semi-finals to face Man City in May. Reflecting on Neymar, Balagué opinionated that his performance in the first 45 minutes of the second leg against Bayern Munich was "the best individual performance of the season". Ahead of the semi-final, the duo of Neymar and Mbappé was viewed as the main threat to Man City. PSG's wait for a first Champions League title continued as they were knocked out by Man City.

In May, towards the end of the season, Neymar was crucial in Ligue 1 amid the title race with Lille, scoring a goal and assisting another in a 2–1 victory over Lens to return PSG back to the top of the league table. He went on to open the scoring against Rennes with a penalty in an eventual 1–1 draw and opened the scoring with a penalty again in a 4–0 win over Reims. On 23 May, however, Lille pipped PSG to the title by just one point, preventing them from winning a record-tying 10th league title. Despite this, they won the Coupe de France, which was Neymar's third and final cup with PSG.

Neymar was nominated for the 2021 Ballon d'Or, which was his ninth nomination — a joint record for a Brazilian player. At the end of the season, the CIES Football Observatory, with support of performance data by InStat, concluded that Neymar ranked second in their list of the top 10 players in Europe during 2020–21 (ahead of Lewandowski and only behind Messi), simultaneously being recognised as the best-performing player in Ligue 1. Earlier on in the year, the IFFHS ranked him only behind Messi, Ronaldo, and Andrés Iniesta for their World's Best Player of the Decade award.

On 8 May, Neymar extended his contract with PSG until 2025. Upon this extension, he said he wanted to achieve PSG's biggest dream, to win the Champions League.

==== 2021–23: 100th club goal, return to top form and departure ====
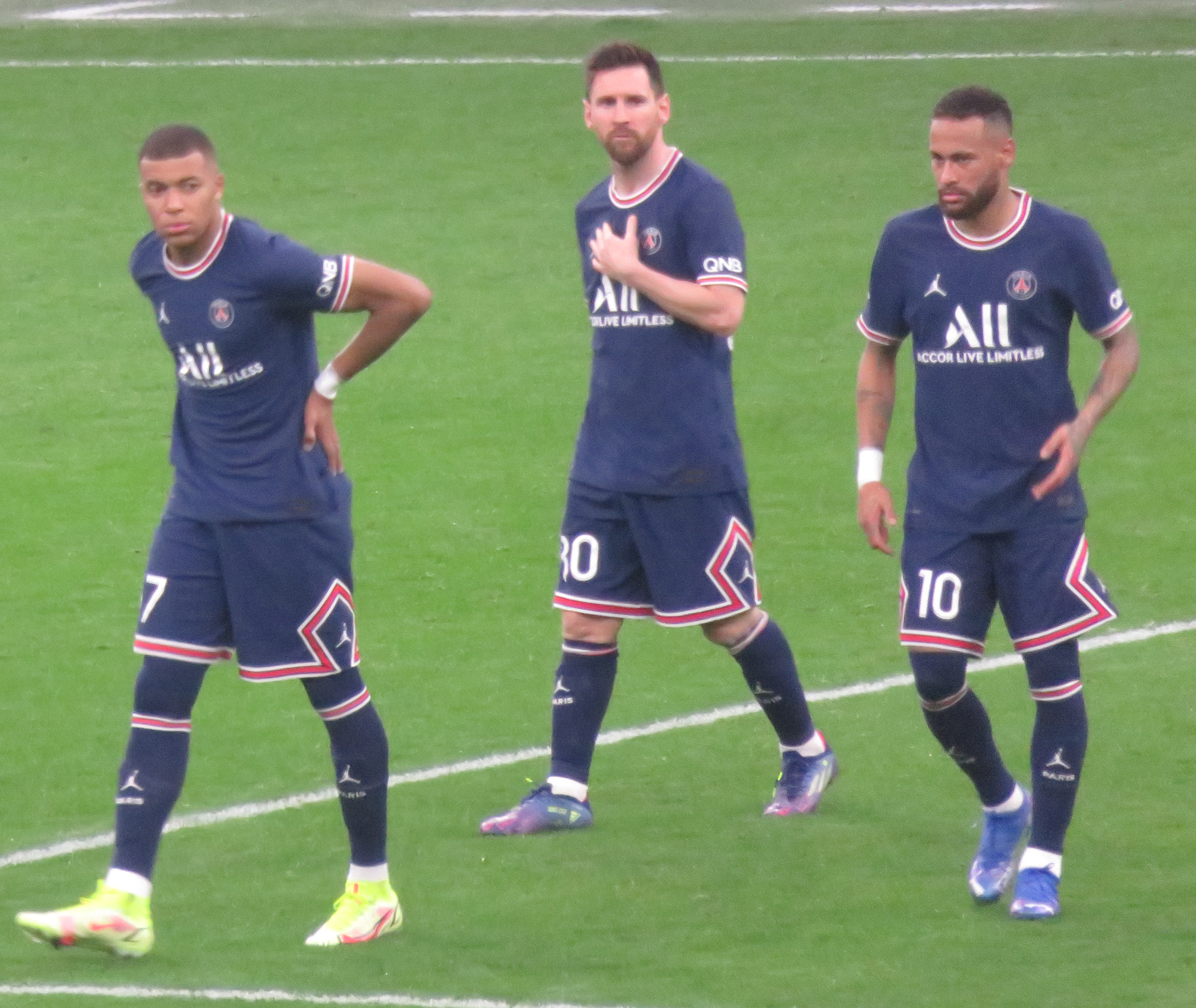
Neymar (right) alongside Messi and Kylian Mbappé in a league fixture against Marseille (Le Classique) in October 2021

Ahead of the 2021–22 season, PSG had acquired several new players, including Neymar's former teammate Messi and longtime Real Madrid defender Sergio Ramos, leading the club to be considered genuine favourites to win the 2021–22 Champions League. The arrival of Messi also saw the formation of a new attacking trio of Mbappé, Neymar, and Messi, dubbed by the media as MNM.

Neymar scored his first goal of the season on 19 September, converting a penalty in a 2–1 win over Lyon. He scored his 400th career goal on 6 November against Bordeaux, where he scored a brace and helped the team win the match 3–2. On 28 November, Neymar suffered an ankle injury in a 3–1 win against Saint-Étienne. The next day, PSG announced that Neymar would be unavailable for up to eight weeks.

On 15 February 2022, Neymar returned in the round of 16 first leg in the Champions League as PSG faced Real Madrid. He came off the bench in the second half and assisted Mbappé with a backheel pass to help his team win 1–0. On 3 April, Neymar scored twice in a 5–1 victory against Lorient before scoring a hat-trick six days later on 9 April, as PSG defeated Clermont 6–1. On 21 May, he scored his 100th goal for PSG in a 5–0 win over Metz, making him one of the few players to have scored at least 100 goals for three different clubs. Neymar helped PSG win their record-tying 10th Ligue 1 title, though with 13 goals and 8 assists across all competitions, this was his lowest output since arriving in Europe in 2013.

Neymar drew criticism for his decline in performance compared to his previous seasons. He notably scored just three goals in Ligue 1 by the time of the lengthy injury sustained in November and scored no goals in the entire Champions League campaign for the first time in his career. In the previous year, he suggested that he was growing tired of the intense demands of European football. He was linked with a potential departure from PSG, but ultimately remained at the club. Ahead of the new season, he said his ambitions included winning the Champions League, further saying, “It must be with Paris. I have a contract with PSG, so there is no other choice.”

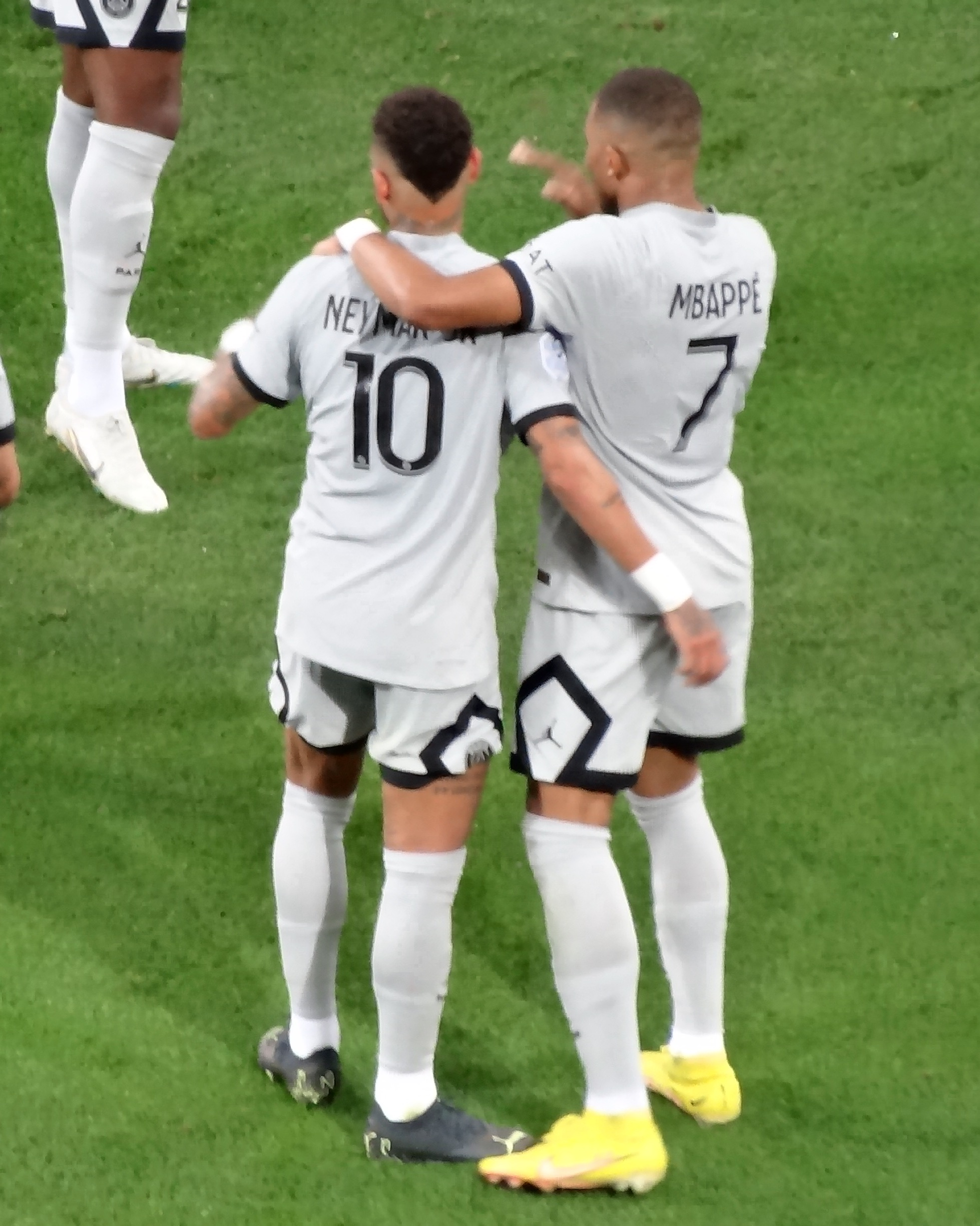
Neymar celebrating with Mbappé after scoring in Ligue 1 in August 2022

Neymar started the 2022–23 season in tremendous form, scoring twice against Nantes on 31 July in PSG's 4–0 result to win the Trophée des Champions, scoring a goal and providing a hat-trick of assists in a 5–0 win against Clermont on 6 August, scoring twice in a 5–2 win against Montpellier, and scoring twice and registering three more assists in a 7–1 away win over Lille. He was named Ligue 1's Player of the Month in August.

On 10 September, Neymar surpassed PSG's former striker Pauleta to become the club's fourth-top scorer of all time, scoring his 110th goal in a 1–0 win in the league against Brest. On 16 October, he scored in a 1–0 win against Marseille, taking PSG three points clear at the top of the league table. Neymar helped PSG extend their lead over Lens at the top of the table, scoring the goal to put PSG 3–2 ahead in an eventual 4–3 victory against Troyes, while also assisting a goal. Neymar was influential in Ligue 1 again on 8 November, when he produced a goal and an assist to help PSG defeat Lorient, winning 2–1.

In the group stage of the Champions League, Neymar registered 2 goals and 2 assists against Juventus, Maccabi Haifa and Benfica, helping PSG advance to the knockout stage. Neymar had returned to his best form and was considered the most in-form player in the world, scoring 15 goals and providing 11 assists in just 20 games. Ahead of the 2022 World Cup that would take place during the winter, both English football pundits Jamie Redknapp and Gary Neville tipped him to be the star player of the tournament. He was also an early favourite for the 2023 Ballon d'Or. In January 2023, Neymar was announced as one of the fourteen players nominated for the 2022 The Best FIFA Men's Player award.

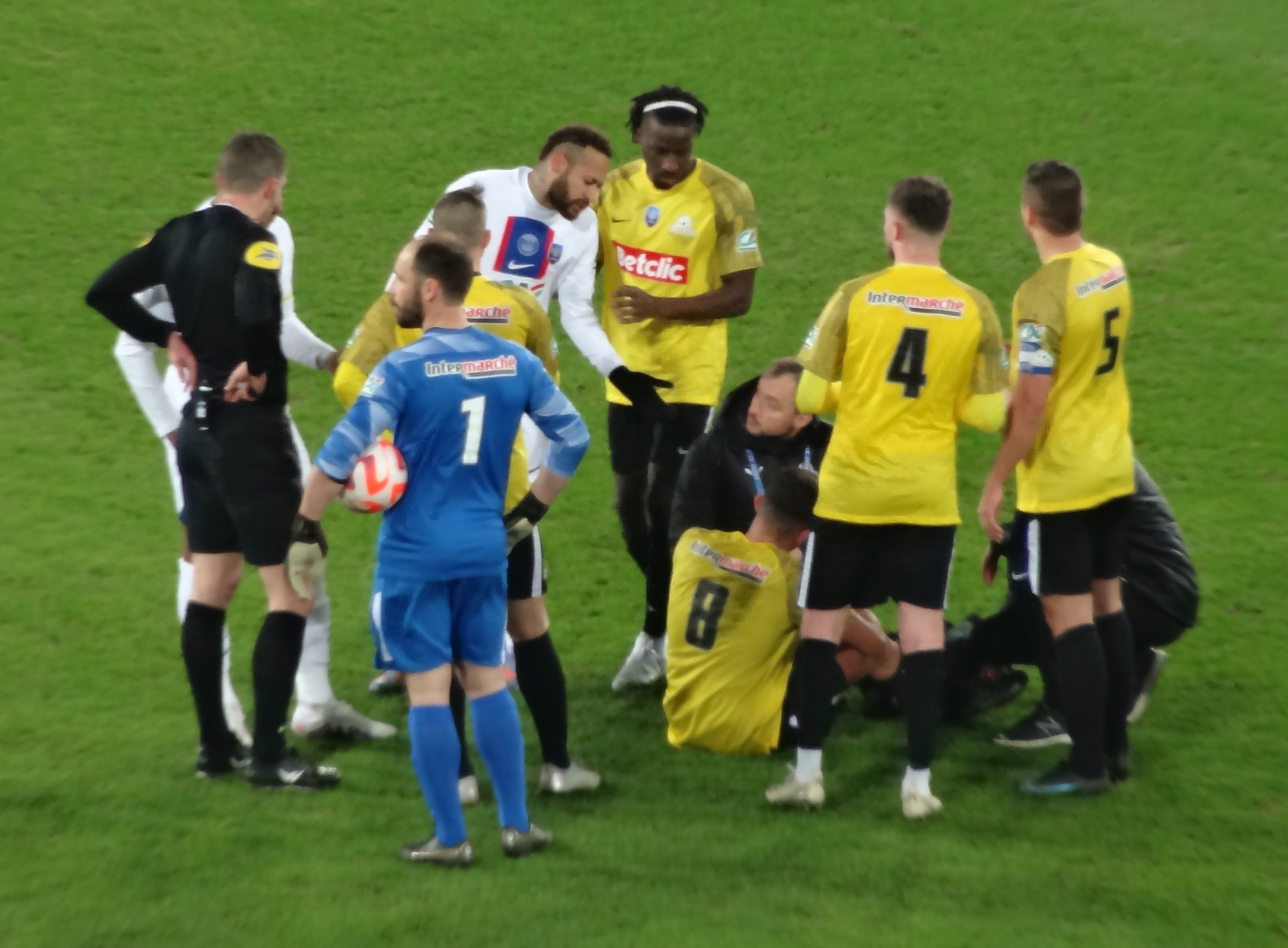
Neymar during a Coupe de France match against Pays de Cassel in January 2023

On 19 February, Neymar suffered a season-ending ankle injury against Lille in a Ligue 1 fixture, in which he scored PSG's second goal in a dramatic 4–3 comeback victory. Following PSG's elimination by Bayern Munich in the Champions League round of 16 on 8 March, Neymar and Messi faced heavy criticism from sections of the French media and PSG supporters; although he missed the second leg, his performance in the first leg — along with other PSG players — was criticised. On 27 May, PSG won Ligue 1 by just one point ahead of Lens; this was Neymar's fifth and final league title in France, contributing with 13 goals and 11 assists in 20 matches.

At the end of the season, PSG began a squad overhaul, with Neymar being one of several players not being in the team's plans for the following season. Neymar was linked with a potential return to Barcelona, however, Barcelona's hierarchy never reached an advanced stage to discuss finer economic details and possibilities, as the club's manager Xavi was not keen on signing him, leading both clubs to fail to reach an agreement.

Neymar has been credited as a legend of PSG, trailing only Ibrahimović, Cavani, and Mbappé in the club's top scorers at the time of his departure, and one of Ligue 1's greatest players. However, his tenure at PSG was marred by injuries, hindering his chances of helping the club win its first Champions League title. He missed 119 matches for PSG in total as a result of being injured around 20 times across his six-year spell, showing a fragility that was not seen either at Barcelona or Santos. Despite this, he had the second-most goal contributions for the club during his six seasons there (188), only behind Mbappé.

Following PSG's first Champions League title win in 2024–25, their captain Marquinhos dedicated the triumph to previous players at the club, including Neymar.

=== Al Hilal ===
On 15 August 2023, Neymar completed a transfer to Saudi Pro League club Al Hilal on a two-year contract, joining a list of European league players who signed for the club, including Rúben Neves, Kalidou Koulibaly, and Sergej Milinković-Savić. The transfer fee was reported to be worth €90 million, making him the most expensive purchase in Saudi Pro League history. He was also reportedly being paid €150m a year at Al Hilal, six times the amount he earned at PSG. According to The Independent, Barcelona was the only European club that showed genuine interest in signing Neymar; other top clubs turned away primarily due to his high salary and the expected transfer fee to sign him.

Some media outlets criticised Neymar for choosing to not remain in a top European league and dubbed him as the 'Prince who never became King' due to leaving Europe without being crowned the world's best player with the Ballon d'Or. However, Neymar declared, "I wouldn't be surprised if the Saudi league is better than the French", in light of fellow star players joining the league, including Ronaldo and Karim Benzema. As a marquee signing, Neymar's transfer to Al Hilal drew comparisons to former Brazil international Rivellino's transfer to the club in 1978.

==== 2023–25: First matches before injury and termination of contract ====
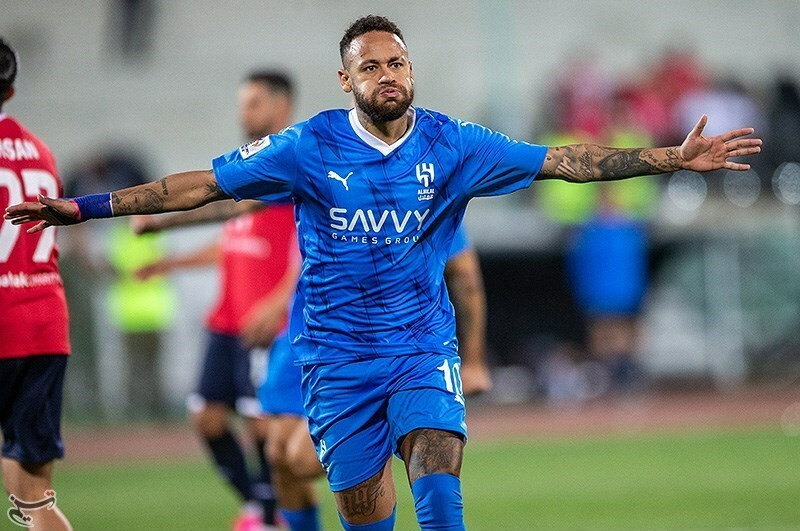
Neymar celebrating his first and only goal for Al Hilal in October 2023

On 15 September 2023, Neymar made his debut for Al Hilal in the league during a 6–1 thrashing of Al-Riyadh, coming off the bench and providing an assist to a goal by fellow Brazilian Malcom. That same year, on 3 October, Neymar scored his first goal for the club in a 3–0 away win against Nassaji Mazandaran in an AFC Champions League group stage match. He played five games for his new club before rupturing his anterior cruciate ligament while on international duty in October 2023 and was out for the rest of the season. Al Hilal won the 2023–24 Saudi Pro League title; despite Neymar playing just three games in the league, he collected his eighth career league title.

Neymar returned to action for 2024–25 on 21 October 2024 during Al Hilal's AFC Champions League match against Al Ain. However, he soon suffered a hamstring injury that sidelined him for the rest of the year. According to Al Hilal coach Jorge Jesus, Neymar could "no longer perform at the level we are used to" due to the lengthy injuries. On 27 January 2025, the club announced an agreement for the termination of Neymar's contract by mutual consent. In a leaving message, Neymar said, "I gave it all to play, and I wish we could have enjoyed better moments together on the field".

Neymar totalled one goal and two assists in seven appearances for Al Hilal; considering his transfer fee and wages, various media outlets debated whether Neymar's transfer to the club is the worst transfer in football history.

=== Santos return ===
==== 2025: Injuries, match-winning performances and avoiding relegation ====
On 30 January 2025, Neymar announced through his social media that he would be signing a contract with his first club Santos. The following day, Santos confirmed his return. One of the reasons for Neymar returning to Santos was to regain top form ahead of the 2026 World Cup. He started wearing the number 10 jersey, the number which Pelé had worn during his time spent between 1956 and 1974. Neymar made his re-debut for Peixe on 6 February, coming on as a half-time substitute for Gabriel Bontempo in a 1–1 Campeonato Paulista home draw against Botafogo-SP. According to Reuters, "The Urbano Caldeira stadium erupted in celebration as jubilant and tearful fans lit up their mobile phones to give the striker, who left the club 12 years ago, a hero's welcome before kick-off." He received the Man of the Match award after the match.

Neymar playing for Santos in February 2025

Neymar scored his first goal after returning ten days later, netting the opener in a 3–1 home win over Água Santa through a penalty; he also assisted Guilherme in the club's third goal, and received another Man of the Match award. On 23 February, Neymar scored directly from a corner kick in a 3–0 win over Inter de Limeira, and earned the Man of the Match award again. With his physical fitness experiencing an improvement compared to his time at Al-Hilal, he would make his Série A debut on 13 March, coming on as a substitute 1–0 loss against Fluminense. In the same month, he was awarded the Best Goal of the 2025 Campeonato Paulista for the direct corner kick goal in February. On 16 April, Neymar wore the number 100 jersey for the match against Atlético Mineiro which resulted in a 2–0 win, landmarking his 100th match at the Vila Belmiro; he would feature in only 32 minutes during the match, however, and was subbed off after suffering an injury.

Neymar spent more than a month sidelined before returning in 2025 Copa do Brasil match against CRB in Maceió on 22 May; coming on as a second-half substitute, he converted his penalty in the shoot-out, but his side was knocked out. Neymar returned to the starting line-up on 1 June in a match against Botafogo. Deployed as a false nine, he played for 76 minutes in the match before being sent off after handballing; Santos eventually lost the match 1–0, with the opponent's goal coming ten minutes after his ejection.

On 24 June, Santos announced Neymar's contract renewal until the end of the year, with an option for a further six months. The club's president Marcelo Teixeira said that Neymar's return to Santos has led to record-breaking social media growth and significant commercial gains for the club. On his first match after the renewal, he scored the winner in a 1–0 home win over Flamengo on 16 July.

On 4 August, Neymar scored twice in a 3–1 win against Juventude, increasing Santos' hopes of remaining in the top division. In September, Santos coach Juan Pablo Vojvoda praised Neymar as "one of the greatest in history". In the same month, he suffered another thigh injury while training, and spent 48 days sidelined before returning to action. Later that year, on 3 December, he scored his first hat-trick since his return in a 3–0 away win over Juventude, helping Santos to move out the relegation zone. The goals took his goal tally for Santos to 150.

==== 2026– ====
On 6 January 2026, Neymar extended his contract with Santos until the end of the year. On 26 February, he led Santos to a 2–1 victory over Vasco da Gama, scoring both goals. On 26 July, he scored twice against Chapecoense in a 2–2 draw, scoring the equaliser from the penalty spot in the final minutes of the game. On 4 August, Neymar assisted the only goal as Santos defeated Remo 1–0 in the 2026 Copa do Brasil to progress to the quarter-finals, however, after the match tension was ignited between the two teams, with Neymar being captured on video taunting the staff of Remo by shouting "eliminated, eliminated". On 13 August, Neymar was decisive in the Copa Sudamericana match against Macará, assisting both goals in a 2–1 comeback victory.

On 2 September 2026, during a match against rivals Palmeiras which sealed Santos' elimination from the national cup, Neymar suffered another thigh injury, being subbed off at half-time. He was also at the centre of controversy weeks later on 17 September; after being caught mocking the Atlético Mineiro players after a 2–0 home win for the first leg of the Copa Sudamericana quarter-finals, he was himself a target of mockery after the club's elimination on penalties. On 9 October, after nearly a month away due to injury, Neymar returned to action and rescued Santos from a loss against league leaders Flamengo, scoring two penalties after coming off the bench as his side drew 2–2. Late in that month, he received a yellow card (for throwing a ball in his opponent) and then a direct red card (for covering his mouth when talking) in a 1–1 home draw against Bahia, both offences ocurring during altercations with Bahia's Rodrigo Nestor; he received a two-match ban (which was later reduced to a simple one-match suspension) for the red card incident, and another one-match ban for accumulation of yellow cards was also triggered.

== International career ==
=== 2010–2012: Senior debut and first major tournaments ===
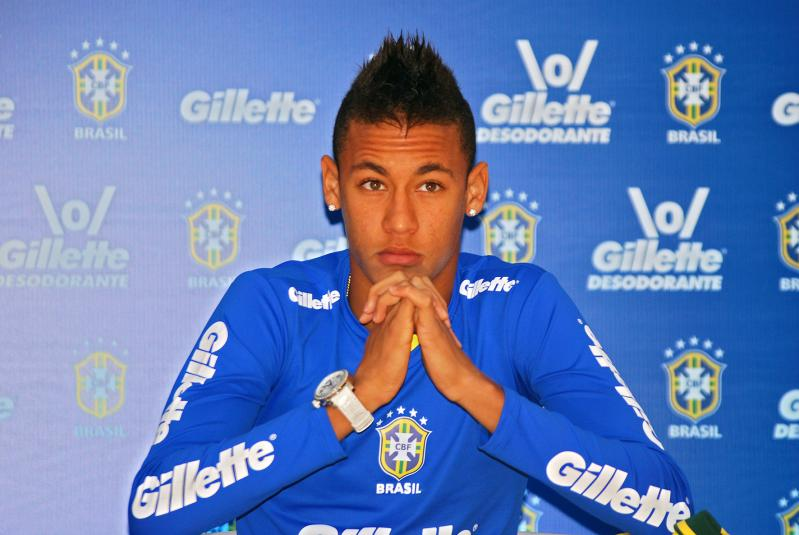
Neymar at a press conference for Brazil in August 2010. He made his senior debut that month aged 18.

Following Neymar's performances for Santos in their successful early 2010 season, including winning the 2010 Copa do Brasil, in which he was the top goalscorer, and the 2010 Campeonato Paulista, in which he scored 14 goals, former Brazilian football players Pelé and Romário reportedly urged coach Dunga to take Neymar to the 2010 World Cup. Although the opinion that Neymar deserved a place in Dunga's squad went as far as a 14,000 signature petition, and despite the pressure on Dunga to pick Neymar, he was omitted from both the squad of 23, and the stand-by list. Although Dunga described Neymar as "extremely talented", he said that the 18-year-old had not been tested sufficiently on the international level to earn a World Cup spot and he had failed to impress enough while on international duty.

On 26 July 2010, Neymar was selected for the first time in the Brazil senior team by new head coach Mano Menezes for a friendly match against the United States to be played in East Rutherford, New Jersey. On 10 August 2010, he made his debut with the national team in that game, aged 18 years old, starting the match and wearing the number 11 jersey. He scored on his debut after 28 minutes, a header coming from an André Santos cross in a 2–0 win for Brazil. On 1 March 2011, Neymar said: "Being on the Brazilian team is a privilege. There are some marvelous players and I'm very happy to be among them."

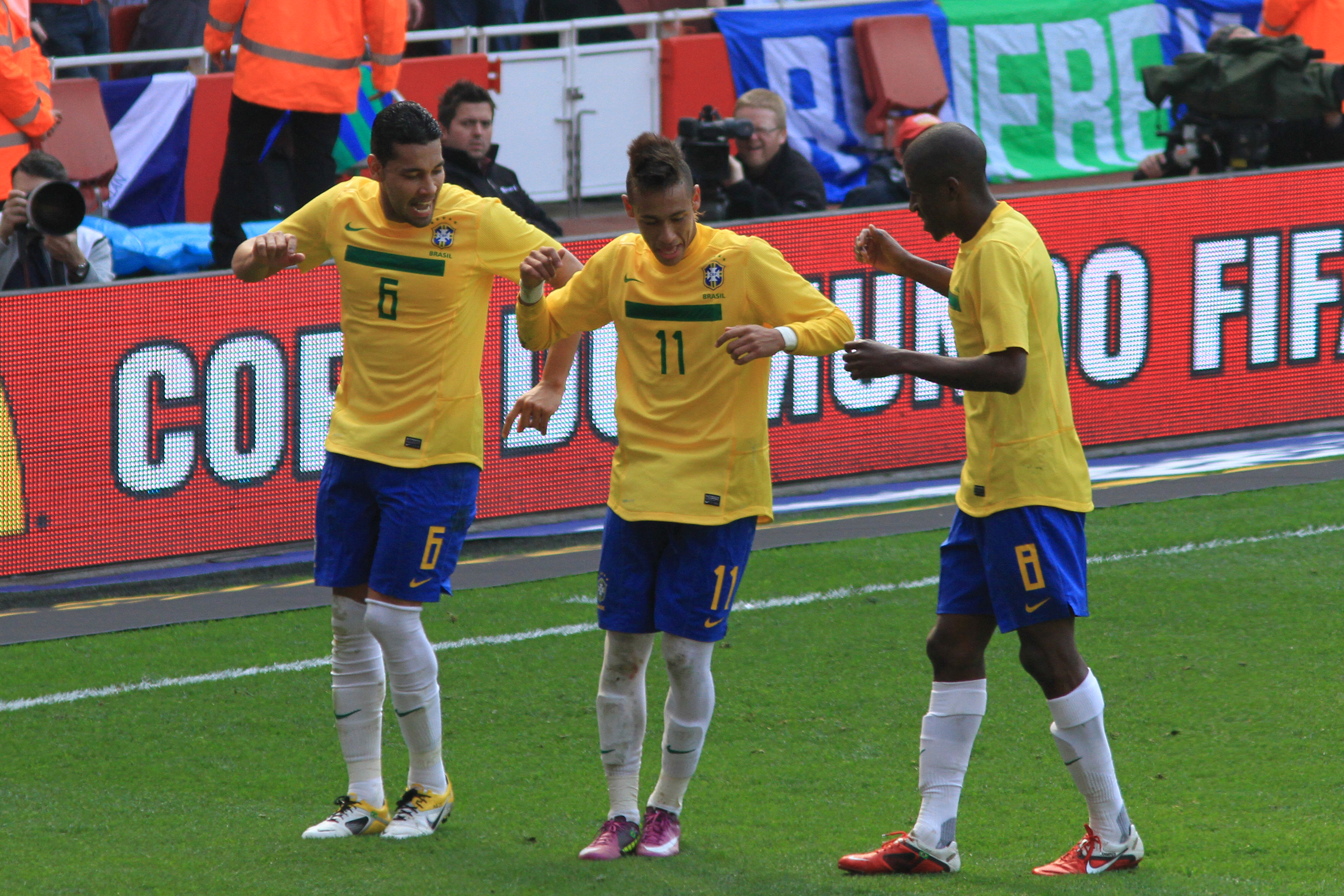
Neymar celebrates his goal for Brazil against Scotland, on 27 March 2011, with André Santos and Ramires.

On 27 March 2011, he scored twice in a 2–0 win against Scotland at the Emirates Stadium. After he scored from the penalty spot, a banana was thrown onto the pitch, leading Neymar to complain about 'constant jeering and an atmosphere of racism' from the stands. While Scottish officials explained that Neymar had been booed solely for perceived injury-feigning, a German student who was in the stadium amongst Brazil supporters said that he threw the banana with no racist intentions. This led to the Scottish Football Association asking the Brazilian Football Confederation for an apology for the accusations made to the Scottish fans. Neymar refused to apologise or retract his words, claiming he "did not accuse any person or any group of supporters".

Neymar was the leading goalscorer of the 2011 South American Youth Championship with nine goals, including two in the final, in Brazil's 6–0 win against Uruguay. He also took part at the 2011 Copa América in Argentina, where he scored two goals in the first-round game against Ecuador. He was selected 'Man of the Match' in Brazil's first match against Venezuela, which ended a 1–1 draw. Brazil were eliminated in the quarter-finals in a penalty shoot-out against Paraguay (2–2 a.e.t.), with Neymar being substituted in the 80th minute.

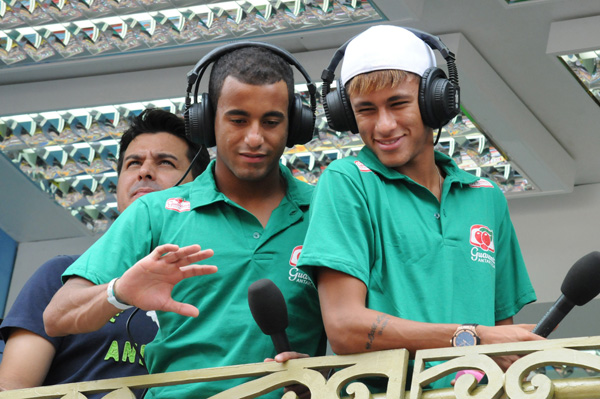
Neymar with Brazilian teammate Lucas Moura on international duty in 2012

By 20 years old, Neymar was viewed as the star player of the national team. At this point, he was described as "a national demigod in Brazil" by SportsPro. On 11 May 2012, Neymar was selected for the squad of the Brazil Olympic football team to participate in the London 2012 Olympic Games. In Brazil's first warm-up match on 20 July 2012, against the host nation Great Britain at Riverside Stadium, Neymar was involved in both goals of a 2–0 win, first making an assist with a free-kick into the six-yard box for Sandro's header, before converting a penalty. On 26 July, he scored his first goal in Brazil's opening fixture against Egypt, which ended a 3–2 victory for Brazil. In the following match against Belarus at Old Trafford in Manchester, Neymar scored a free-kick from 25-yards into the top-right corner of the goal and set up goals for Alexandre Pato's header with a cross from the right and Oscar with a back heel as Brazil secured their place in the quarter-finals with a 3–1 win. Afterwards he said: "I scored and made two assists so for me it was perfect".

On 5 August 2012, in the quarter-final encounter against Honduras, Neymar scored a penalty, his third goal of the tournament and assisted in Leandro Damião's second goal on the match, to help Brazil to a 3–2 victory at St James' Park and book a place in the semi-finals. On 11 August, Brazil lost 2–1 to Mexico in the final at Wembley Stadium in London.

Neymar scored his first full international hat-trick on 10 September 2012, in an 8–0 win over China at the Estádio José do Rego Maciel in Recife. On 19 September, Neymar scored the winner against Argentina in a 2–1 win in the first leg of the 2012 Superclásico de las Américas at the Estádio Serra Dourada in Goiânia, Brazil.

=== 2013–2014: Confederations Cup triumph and World Cup breakthrough ===
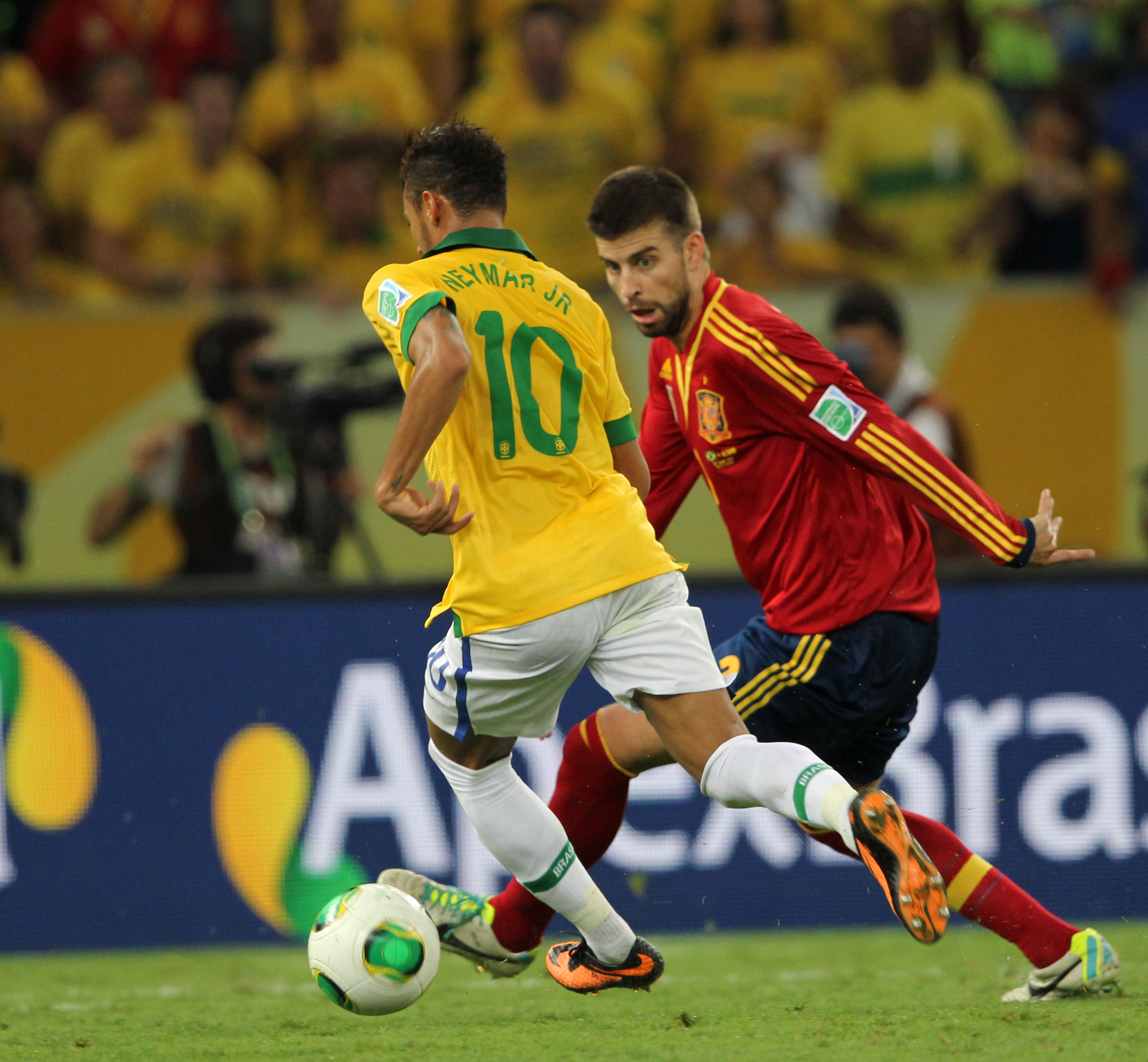
Neymar playing against Spain's Gerard Piqué in the 2013 FIFA Confederations Cup Final

Neymar was selected as part of Luiz Felipe Scolari's Brazil squad for the 2013 Confederations Cup on home soil. For the tournament he was assigned the number 10 shirt, having previously worn 11.

Neymar scored the first goal of the tournament in a 3–0 win over Japan at the Estádio Nacional Mané Garrincha on 15 June. In their second match, Neymar scored after nine minutes and crossed for Jô's late goal to give Brazil a 2–0 win over Mexico. He scored in his third consecutive match, with a powerful free kick from the edge of the penalty area, as Brazil beat Italy 4–2, and received his third consecutive man-of-the-match award. On 30 June, Neymar was involved in Fred's opening goal and then subsequently scored Brazil's second in the 3–0 final victory over Spain. Neymar's performances saw him receive the Golden Ball for player of the tournament. He also finished in 5th place for the 2013 FIFA Ballon d'Or.

On 5 March 2014, Neymar scored a hat-trick in a friendly win against South Africa in Johannesburg. He made headlines for his conduct after the final whistle when a South African boy ran onto the pitch. As security staff began to escort the boy from the field, Neymar intervened and introduced him to his Brazil teammates before they lifted him in the air during their celebrations.

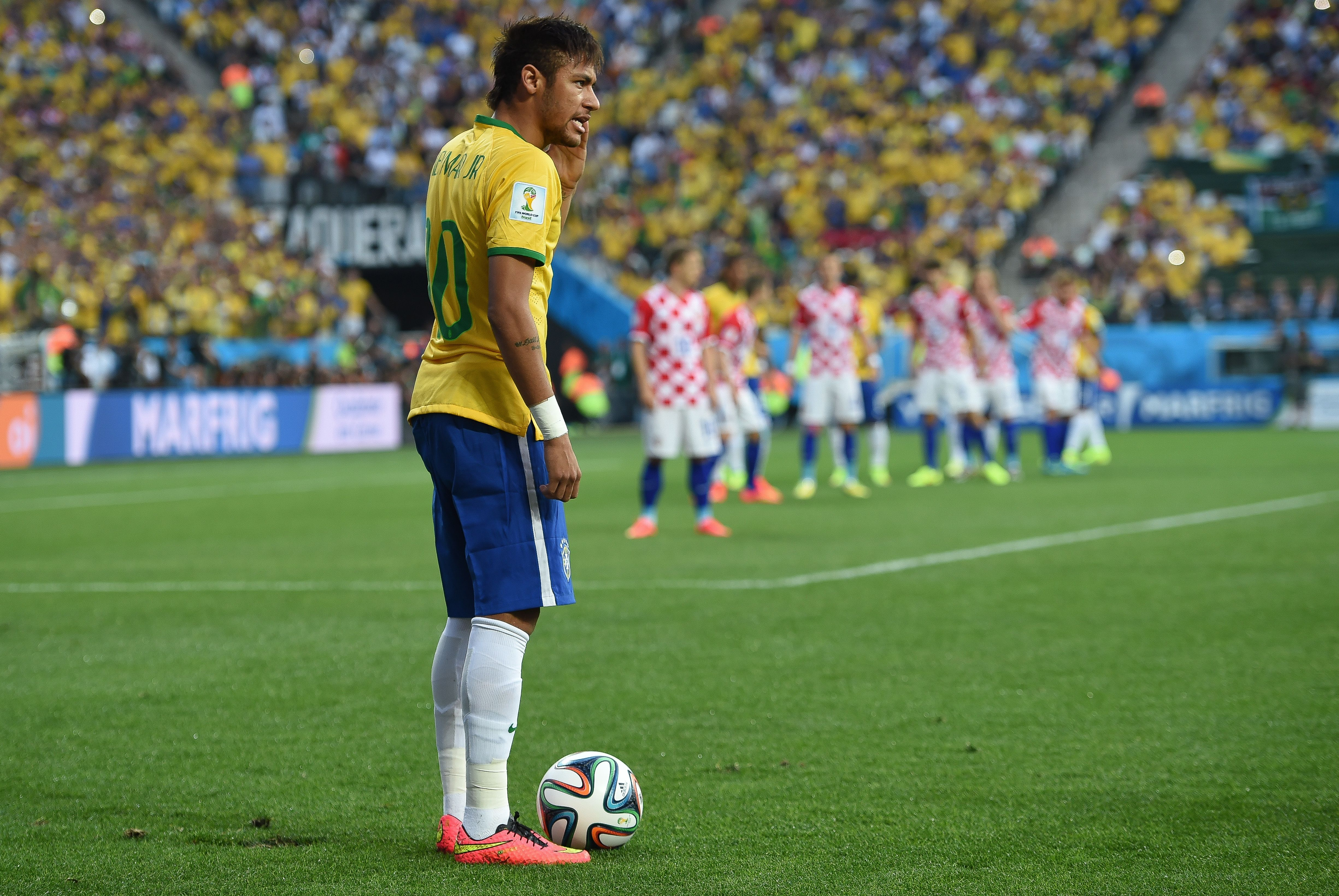
Neymar prepares to take a free kick during Brazil's opening match of the 2014 FIFA World Cup against Croatia.

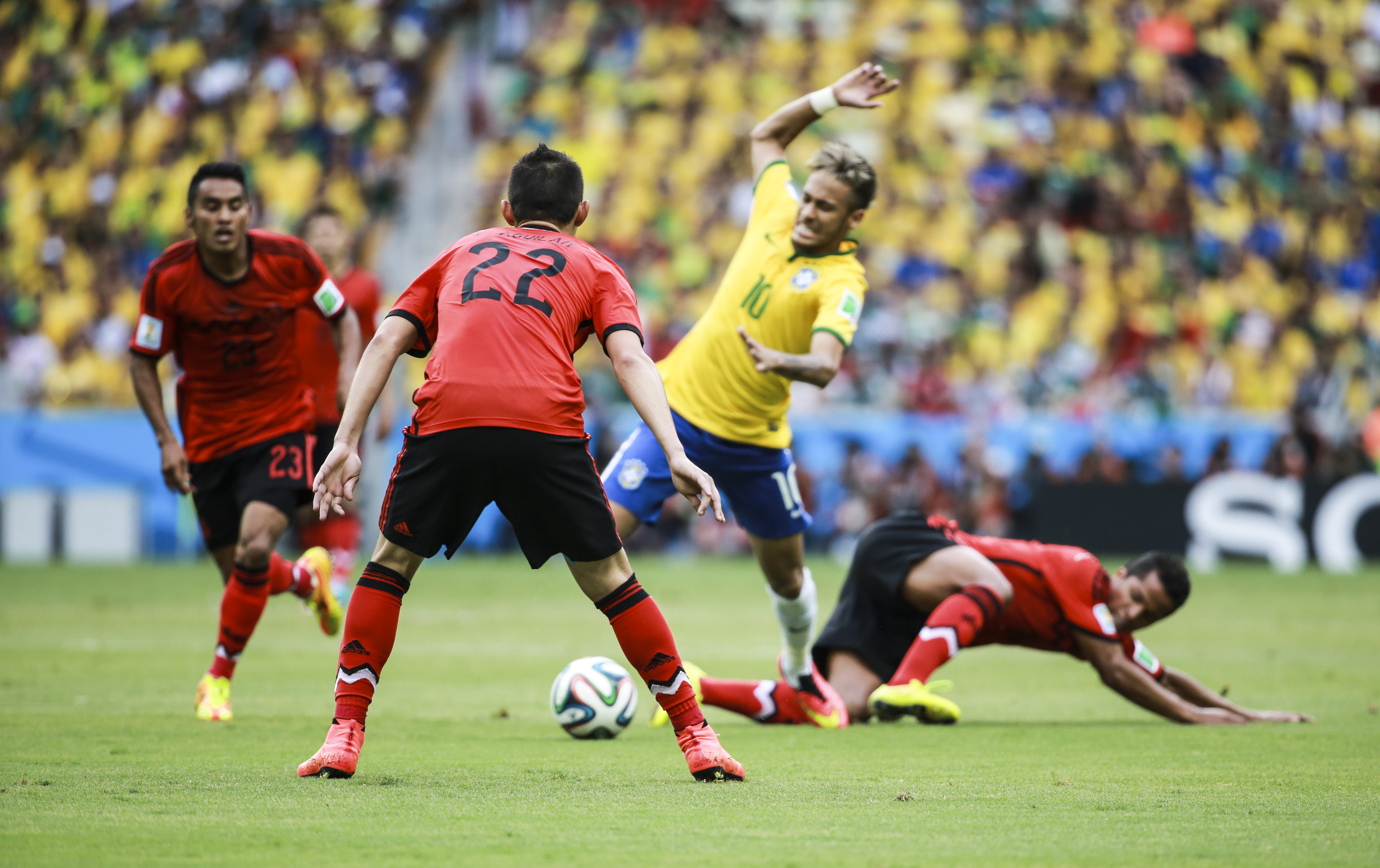
Neymar evading a tackle against Mexico at the 2014 World Cup

On 2 June, Neymar was named in the Brazil squad for the 2014 World Cup. Going into the tournament as the team's star player, Neymar was expected to lead Brazil to their sixth World Cup success, and first title on home soil. One week prior to the team's opening match, Neymar scored once and made two assists in a 4–0 friendly win over Panama.

Neymar earned his 50th international cap in the opening match of the tournament, on 12 June against Croatia in São Paulo. In the 26th minute, with Croatia leading 1–0, Neymar elbowed Croatian midfielder Luka Modrić, after which Neymar was issued a yellow card. Many critics agreed that Neymar's punishment was too lenient and that he should have been issued a red card. He equalised before half-time with a shot from outside the box and gave Brazil the lead in the second half with a penalty kick, following a controversial decision by the referee, in an eventual 3–1 win. In the third group match, he again scored twice as the Seleção defeated Cameroon 4–1 to reach the knockout stage. In the round of 16 against Chile, the match finished 1–1 after 120 minutes and was decided by a penalty shoot-out with Neymar scoring what proved to be the winning kick for Brazil.

In the quarter-final win over Colombia, while challenging for the ball, Neymar was kneed in the back by Juan Camilo Zúñiga and had to be removed from the pitch on a stretcher. A hospital scan revealed that Neymar had suffered a fractured vertebra in his spine and he missed the rest of the World Cup. Earlier in the match, Neymar assisted Thiago Silva's opening goal with a cross from a corner kick. It was the second Neymar assist from a corner in the tournament, after creating David Luiz's goal in the previous round against Chile. Without their injured talisman Neymar (and the suspended captain Thiago Silva), Brazil would ultimately lose in the semi-final in a stunning 7–1 defeat to eventual champion Germany on 8 July.

On 11 July, Neymar was named on the 10-man shortlist for the World Cup Golden Ball award for the tournament's best player. He won the Bronze Boot as the tournament's third top goalscorer and was voted in the Dream Team.

Having scored 15 goals for Brazil in 2014, Neymar finished as runner-up for the IFFHS World's Best International Goal Scorer award, the second time he had done so after 2012.

=== 2015–2016: Assuming the captaincy and Olympic gold ===
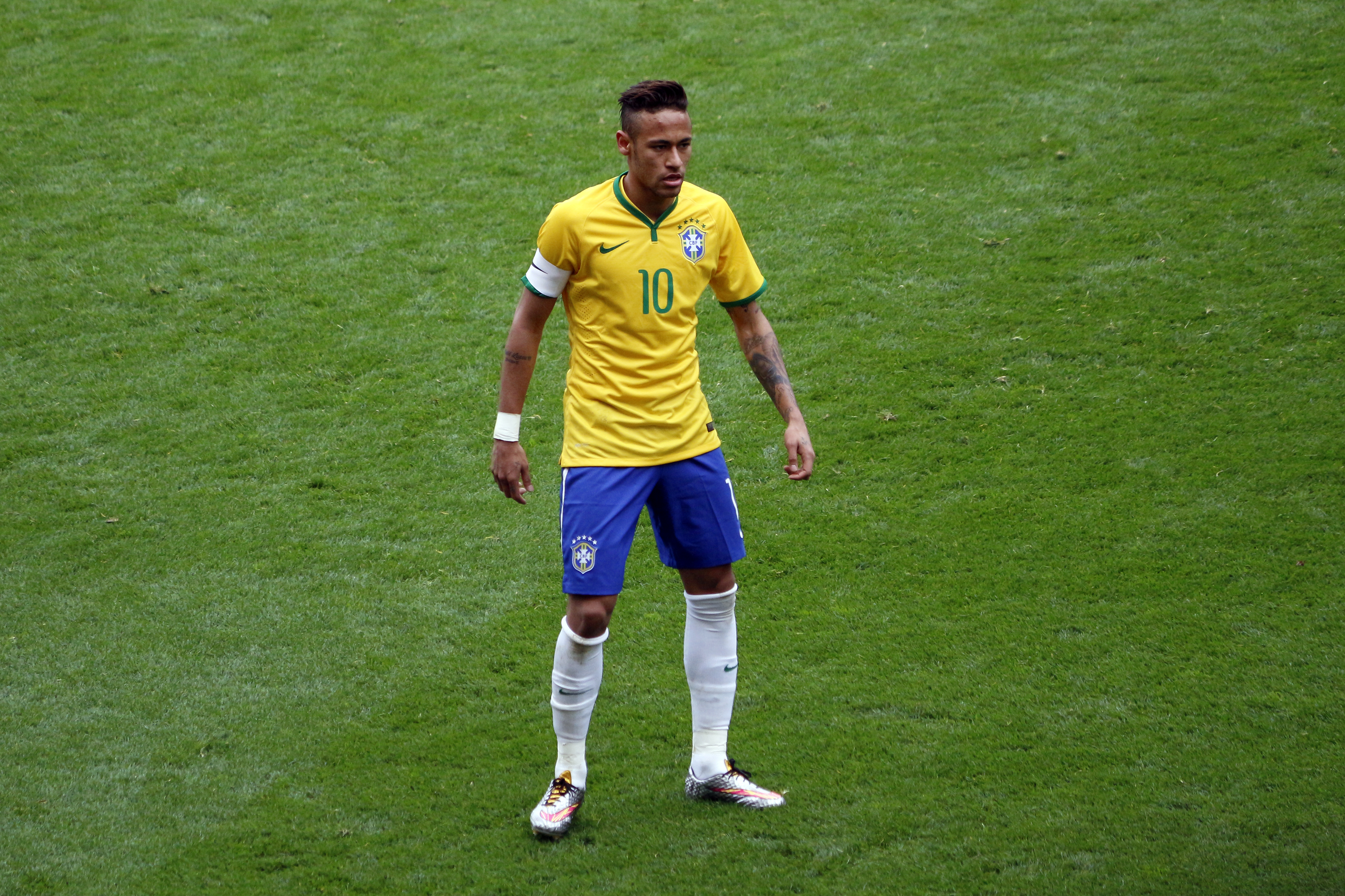
Neymar captaining Brazil during a friendly match against Chile on 29 March 2015

With captain Thiago Silva ruled out through injury, new coach Dunga decided to make Neymar captain and confirmed on 5 September that the forward would stay on as skipper on a permanent basis. On 14 October 2014, Neymar scored four goals in one game for the first time in his international career, scoring all of Brazil's goals in 4–0 friendly win against Japan at the National Stadium, Singapore. At the age of just 22 years, Neymar had scored 40 goals in 58 internationals, and had become the fifth highest goalscorer for his national team. On 26 March 2015, Neymar scored Brazil's second goal in a 3–1 friendly win over France in Paris.

On 14 June 2015, in Brazil's opening Copa América fixture, Neymar scored the equaliser and assisted the stoppage-time winning goal by Douglas Costa as Brazil came from 0–1 down to beat Peru 2–1 in Temuco. After Brazil's second match, a 0–1 loss to Colombia in Santiago, Neymar was booked for handball, resulting in a suspension. After the final whistle, he was red carded for deliberately kicking the ball at Pablo Armero, and as a result was pushed over by Colombian striker Carlos Bacca, who was also dismissed. CONMEBOL issued Neymar with a four-match ban, ruling him out for the remainder of the tournament, in addition to a $10000 fine.

The CBF had wanted Neymar to play at the Copa América Centenario and the Olympics in Rio during the summer of 2016, but after a request from Barcelona manager Luis Enrique, he was rested from the first tournament. In late June 2016, he was subsequently one of the three over-23 players to be included in Brazil's squad for the 2016 Summer Olympics on home soil, and was named the team's captain by the Olympic side's manager Rogério Micale.

In Brazil's quarter-final clash with Colombia on 13 August, Neymar scored Brazil's first goal of the match, from a direct free kick, and also set up his nation's second goal in an eventual 2–0 win. In Brazil's semi-final clash with Honduras on 18 August, Neymar scored twice, Brazil's first and last goals of the match, in a 6–0 win.

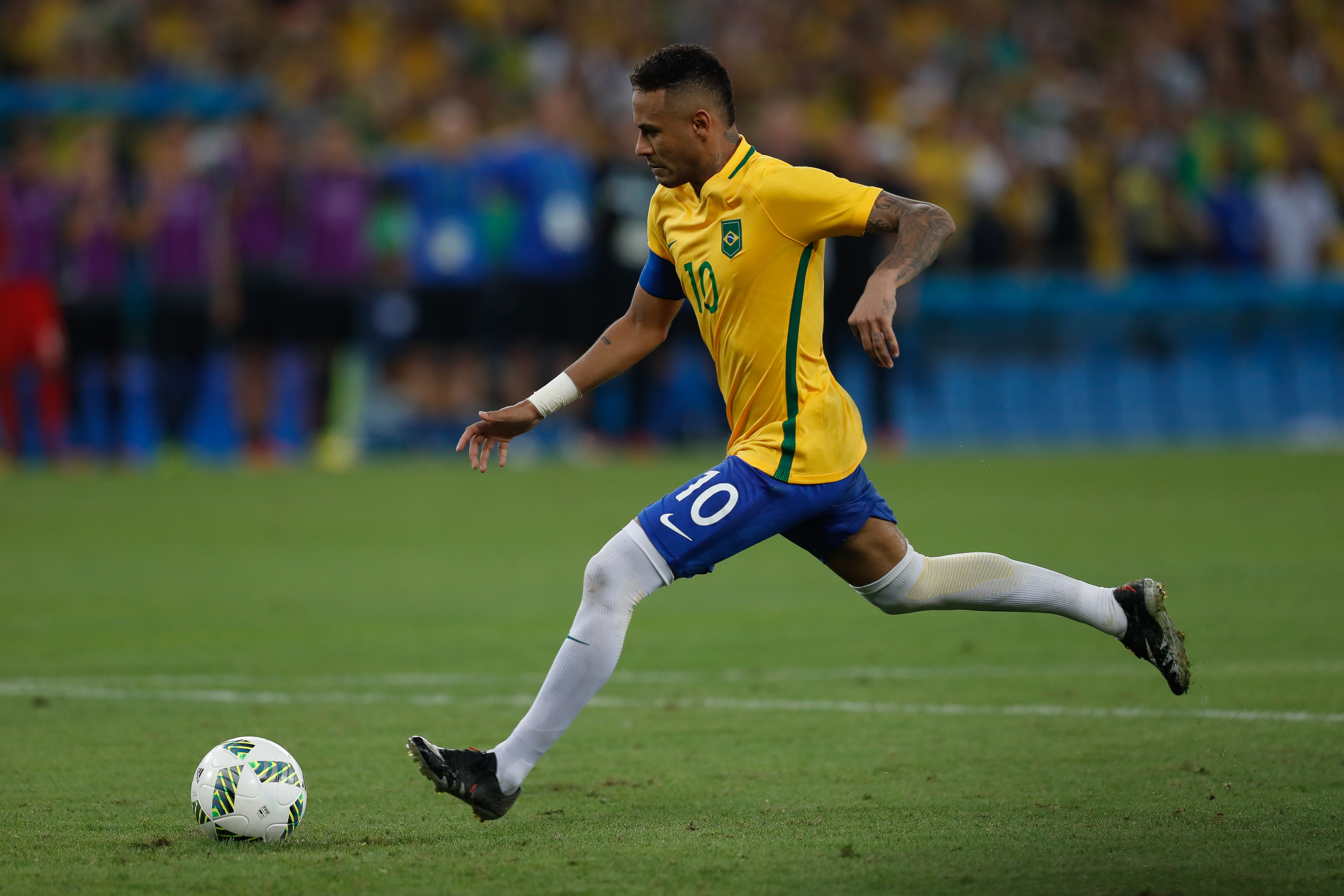
Neymar preparing to strike the winning penalty kick for Brazil against Germany in the Olympic final

In the final against Germany at the Maracanã in Rio on 20 August, Neymar opened the scoring with a free-kick after 27 minutes. The game finished 1–1 after Max Meyer equalised in the second-half. Brazil beat Germany 5–4 on penalties, and Neymar scored the winning penalty to bring Brazil its first Olympic gold medal in men's football. He was hailed as a hero in Brazil for helping end the nation's conquest for an Olympic gold medal. Neymar was named by the Brazilian Olympic Committee as the best footballer of the Olympics.

Both during and prior to the tournament, Neymar had been subjected to criticism over his conduct on and off the pitch, with several former Brazil players suggesting that he was not fit to captain the national team. Neymar subsequently renounced the captaincy following their Olympic victory.

On 10 November, Neymar scored his 50th goal for Brazil in a 3–0 win in the 2018 World Cup qualifier against Argentina, doing so at 24 years old; this made him the third-youngest player to reach the milestone.

=== 2018: World Cup disappointment ===
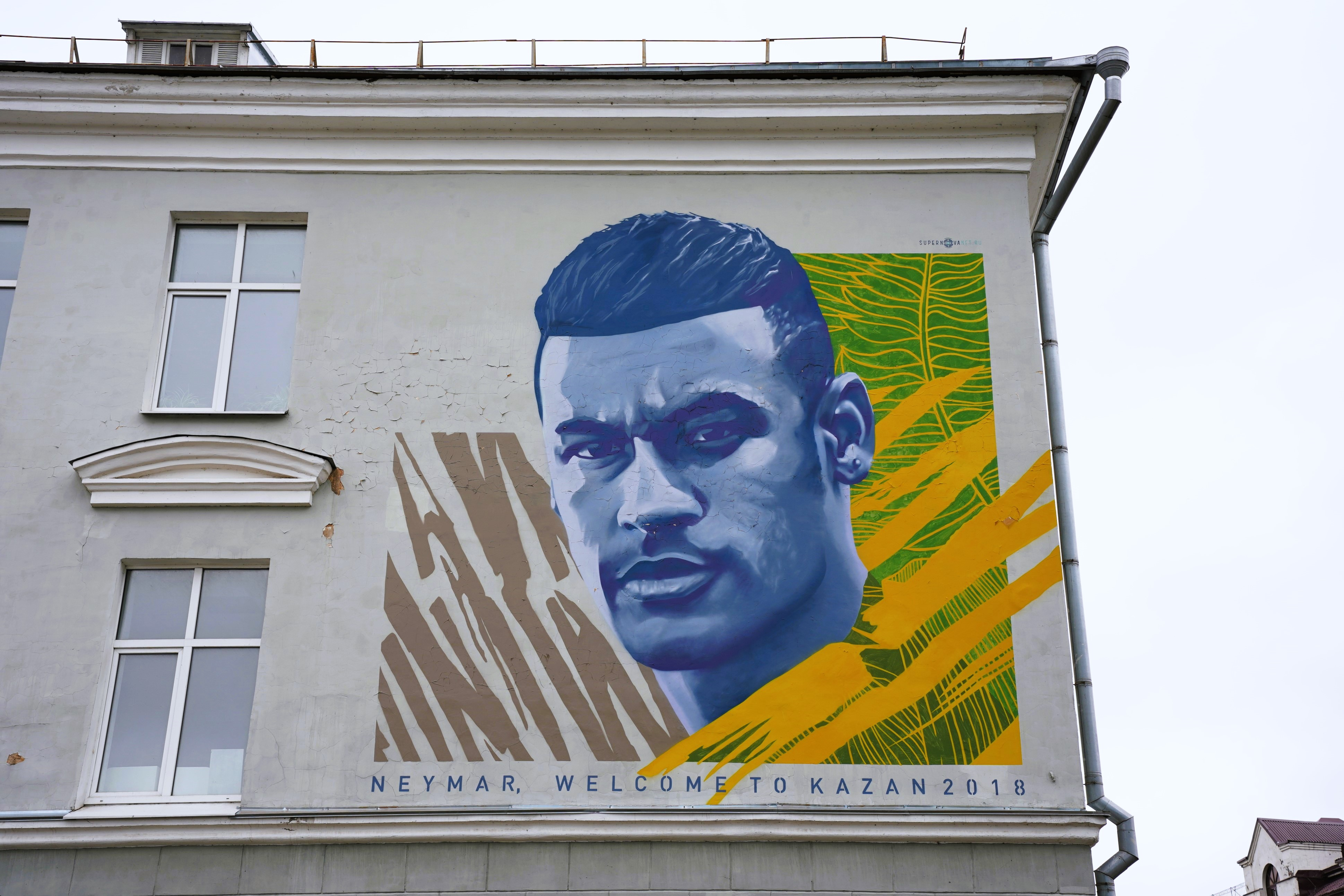
A mural of Neymar ahead of the 2018 World Cup in Kazan, Russia

Neymar was rushed back prior to the 2018 World Cup in Russia following his injury in February with PSG. In May 2018, he was named in Tite's final 23-man squad for the 2018 World Cup in Russia. On 3 June 2018, he made his international comeback after a three-month absence from a foot injury and scored a goal in a 2–0 win over Croatia in a friendly match at Anfield. His playing style was not quite the same as he appeared to be avoiding physical contact entirely rather than simply trying to draw fouls. The following week, he became Brazil's joint-third highest goalscorer alongside Romário when he scored his 55th international goal in a 3–0 friendly win over Austria.

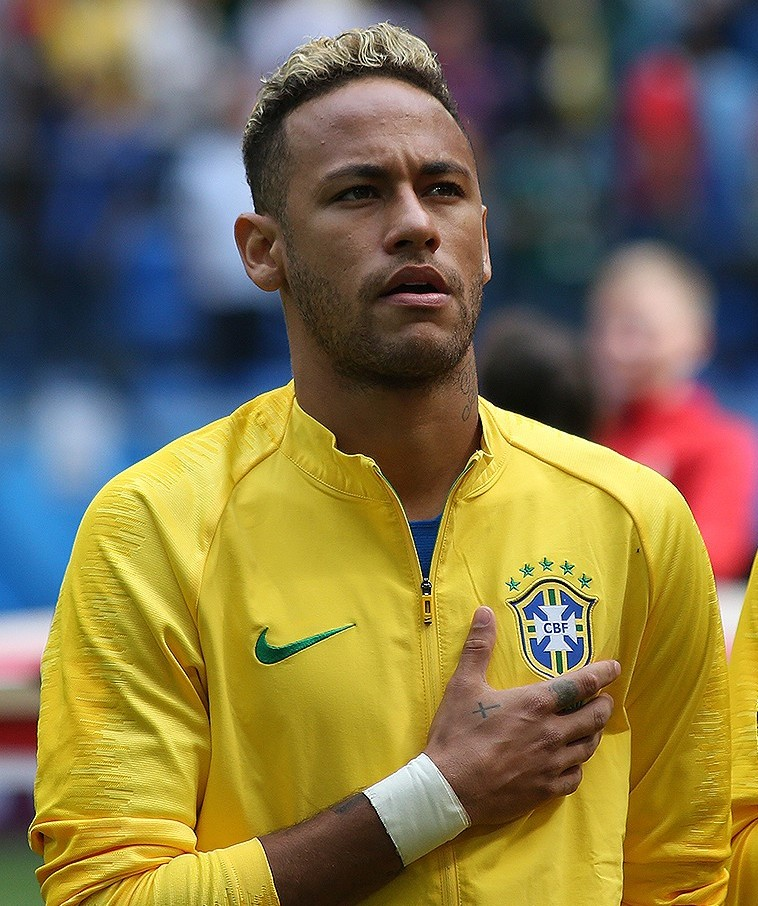
Neymar during the national anthem of Brazil at the 2018 World Cup

In Brazil's opening match at the World Cup against Switzerland, Neymar was noted as their main threat, which was proved by him being fouled 10 times during the match. This was the most fouls a player had suffered in a World Cup match since Alan Shearer against Tunisia in 1998, who was fouled 11 times. Switzerland were able to limit Neymar throughout the match, with it ending a 1–1 draw. In Brazil's second World Cup match, played against Costa Rica at the Krestovsky Stadium, Saint Petersburg, on 22 June, Neymar scored the team's second goal in injury time as Brazil won 2–0. The goal, his 56th for Brazil, took him third in the all-time scoring chart behind only Pelé and Ronaldo. On 2 July, Neymar scored his second goal of the World Cup in a 2–0 win over Mexico in the last 16, while also assisting Roberto Firmino for his goal.

After the Mexico game, BBC Sport wrote that despite Neymar's "good performances" coming up top in several statistics at the World Cup, "there is still a sense that he remains widely unpopular among neutrals" due to his "petulance and the play-acting". Meanwhile, Brazilian newspaper O Globo wrote that "Neymar has charmed Brazil, but annoyed the whole world". On 6 July, Brazil were eliminated after losing 2–1 against Belgium in the quarter-finals, with Neymar denied an injury time equaliser by a finger-tip save from Belgium goalkeeper Thibaut Courtois.

=== 2019–2021: Copa América runner-up ===
In May 2019, Neymar was included in Brazil's 23-man squad for the 2019 Copa América on home soil. On 5 June, however, he suffered an ankle injury in a 2–0 friendly win over Qatar and was ruled out of the tournament, with Neymar expected to miss four weeks due to the injury.

On 10 October 2019, Neymar played his 100th match for Brazil in a friendly draw 1–1 with Senegal in Singapore. On 13 October 2020, he scored a hat-trick in a 2022 World Cup qualifier against Peru, which Brazil won 4–2. He reached his 64th international goal and surpassed Ronaldo as the nation's second highest goalscorer of all time.

Towards the end of 2020, Neymar was inducted into the Maracanã Hall of Fame. In early 2021, the IFFHS ranked him in second place behind Messi for their CONMEBOL The Best Man Player of the Decade (2011–2020) award. On 13 June 2021, in Brazil's opening group match of the 2021 Copa América, which took place on home soil, Neymar scored his team's second goal from the penalty spot and later assisted another for Gabriel Barbosa in a 3–0 win over Venezuela. In the following match on 17 June, he once again scored the second goal in an eventual 4–0 win over Peru. On 23 June he assisted Casemiro's match–winning goal from a corner in injury time of a 2–1 win over Colombia. On 2 July, he assisted Lucas Paquetá's goal in a 1–0 win over Chile in the quarter-finals of the competition. Three days later, he once again assisted Paquetá for the only goal of the match in the semi-finals against Peru. On 10 July, Brazil were defeated 1–0 by Argentina in the final. Despite the loss, Neymar received the Golden Ball alongside Argentina's Messi for his performances throughout the competition.

On 9 September 2021, Neymar scored the second goal in a 2–0 win over Peru and became Brazil's all-time top scorer in World Cup qualification matches, with 12 in total.

=== 2022–2023: Third World Cup and Brazil's all-time top scorer ===
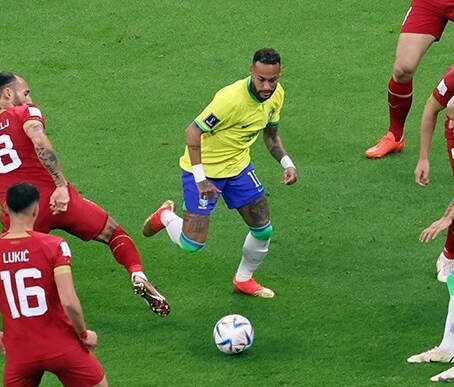
Neymar playing against Serbia in the group stage of the 2022 World Cup

On 7 November 2022, Neymar was named in the Brazil squad for the 2022 World Cup. Heading into the World Cup, Neymar was arguably in the best form of his career during the 2022–23 season, scoring 15 goals and providing 11 assists in just 20 games. According to Maram Albaharna and several other sports journalists, he was a large part of the reason why Brazil were favourites to win the World Cup. The 2022 World Cup was touted to potentially be Neymar's crowning moment for his career. Neymar, alongside Messi and Mbappé, was widely favourite to win the Golden Ball.

Neymar played 79 minutes of Brazil's first match on 24 November and assisted the opening goal in a 2–0 win against Serbia, but was unable to play the next two group games due to ankle ligament damage. Neymar recovered from his injury to play against South Korea in the last 16 on 5 December, where he assisted Vinícius Júnior's opening goal and scored a penalty in a 4–1 win for Brazil; as a result, he became only the third Brazilian player ever, after Pelé and Ronaldo, to score in three different World Cups.

'Keep inspiring us. I will keep punching the air with joy for every goal you score'

— Pelé congratulates Neymar on equalling his record of 77 official international goals.

Four days later, in the quarter-final match against Croatia, Neymar lit the match up in extra time with a "magical" run before scoring; he played two one-twos with his teammates before quickly finding himself in the box and going past the goalkeeper to score into the empty net. Journalist Michael Cox described it as one of the "greatest individual goals in football history". It was Neymar's 77th international goal, which equalled Pelé's official goal tally for the national team. Brazil, however, suffered a shock defeat, losing 4–2 in the ensuing penalty shootout following a 1–1 draw after extra time, before Neymar was able to take Brazil's final penalty. Neymar was distraught on the pitch; overwhelmed with emotion, he hinted that it could be his last game for Brazil. In a later social media post, he said that the defeat to Croatia "psychologically destroyed" him and that it was the defeat that had affected him the most in his career, causing him to be "paralysed" for 10 minutes after the match.

On 8 September 2023, Neymar scored twice for Brazil in a 5–1 win over Bolivia in their opening match for 2026 FIFA World Cup qualification. His 78th and 79th goals in his 125th appearance for Brazil, Neymar became the national team's top goalscorer ahead of Pelé. Mimicking Pelé's punch in the air goal celebration with the first of his two goals, Neymar stated after the game that he never imagined he would reach the record. Brazil coach Fernando Diniz declared that Neymar is one of the greatest players in history following this achievement, whilst The Athletic asserted that Neymar should be remembered as "one of the best the game has seen". His 79th goal also made him the second-highest South American men's goalscorer. A month later, he tied former American player Landon Donovan on achieving a record 58 assists (in 127 matches) in international football; in the 50th minute of Brazil's World Cup qualifier against Venezuela, his corner kick was headed in by defender Gabriel. Nearly exactly two years later, the record was surpassed by Messi in October 2025, who reached 60 assists, though it took him considerably more matches to do so (195).

=== 2023–2026: Long-term injury hiatus, final World Cup and retirement ===
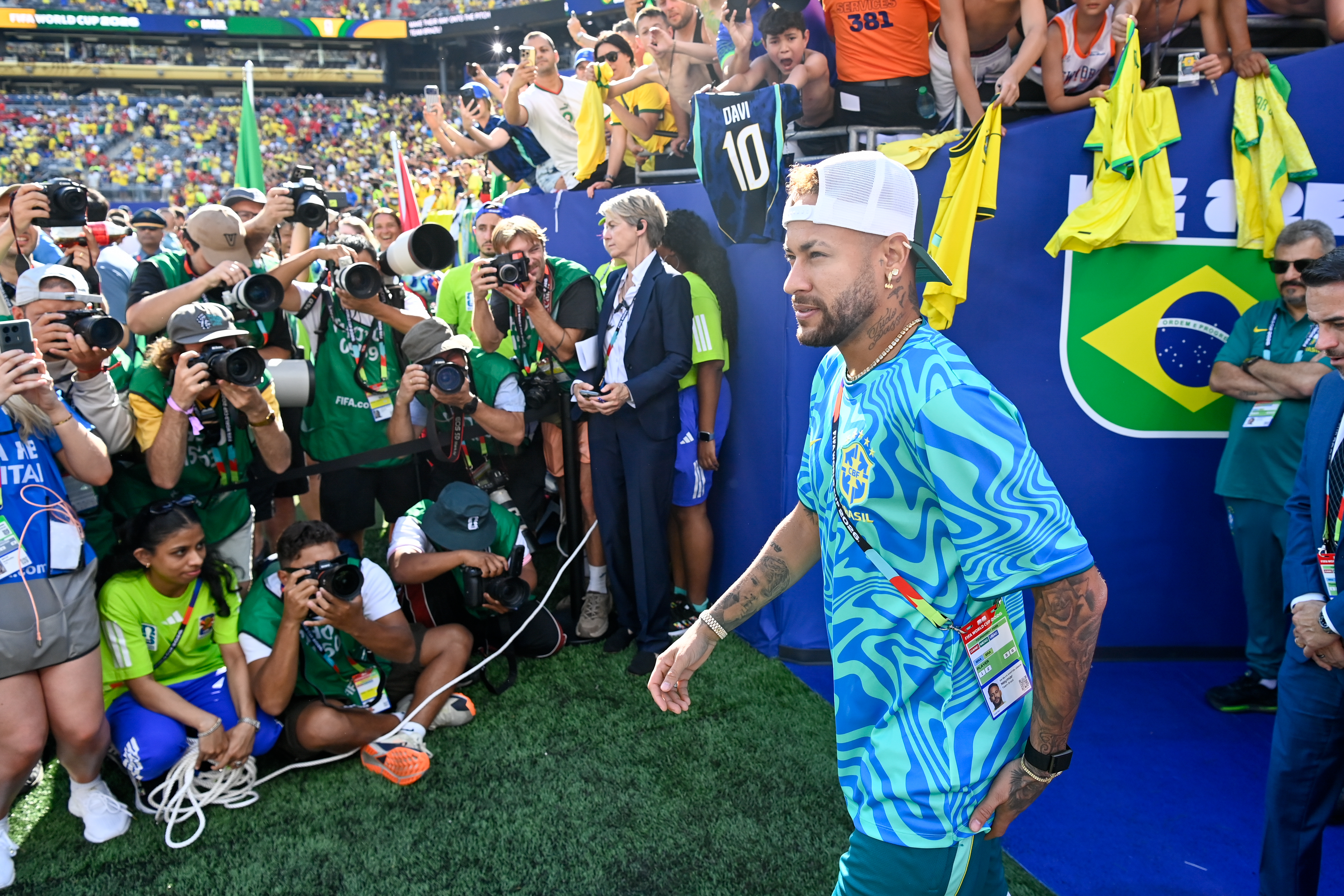
Neymar ahead of the 2026 World Cup group stage match against Morocco on 14 June

On 17 October 2023, in Brazil's 2–0 qualifying defeat to Uruguay, Neymar was taken off in tears on a stretcher at the end of the first half, following an awkward landing after a challenge. Neymar would confirm later that week that he had ruptured his ACL and meniscus completely in his left knee and would need to undergo surgery, likely ruling him out for the remainder of the 2023–24 campaign; consequently, he was left out of Brazil's squad for the 2024 Copa América. On 2 March 2025, he was selected in the 29-men in the preliminary squad for the national team. However, he would make no appearances with the national team throughout the year.

On 18 May 2026, Neymar was named to the 26-man squad for the 2026 FIFA World Cup. Later that month, he sustained a calf injury that ruled him out for two to three weeks, causing him to miss the friendly matches leading up to the tournament. On 24 June, he made his first appearance at the 2026 World Cup in Brazil's final group match, coming on as a substitute in a 3–0 victory over Scotland. It was his first appearance with Brazil in over two years. Hence, he became the fourth Brazilian player to feature in four World Cup tournaments, following Pelé, Djalma Santos and Cafu. On 5 July, Neymar scored from a penalty in a 2–1 loss to Norway in the round of 16; it was his ninth World Cup goal, making him only the second Brazilian player to score in four World Cups after Pelé.

Following the defeat, Neymar announced his retirement from international football, ending his career at MetLife Stadium, the same stadium where he made his debut for Brazil, with 80 goals in 130 appearances. Later that month, Neymar confirmed his retirement from international football, stating that his time with the national team had "passed".

== Player profile ==
=== Style of play ===
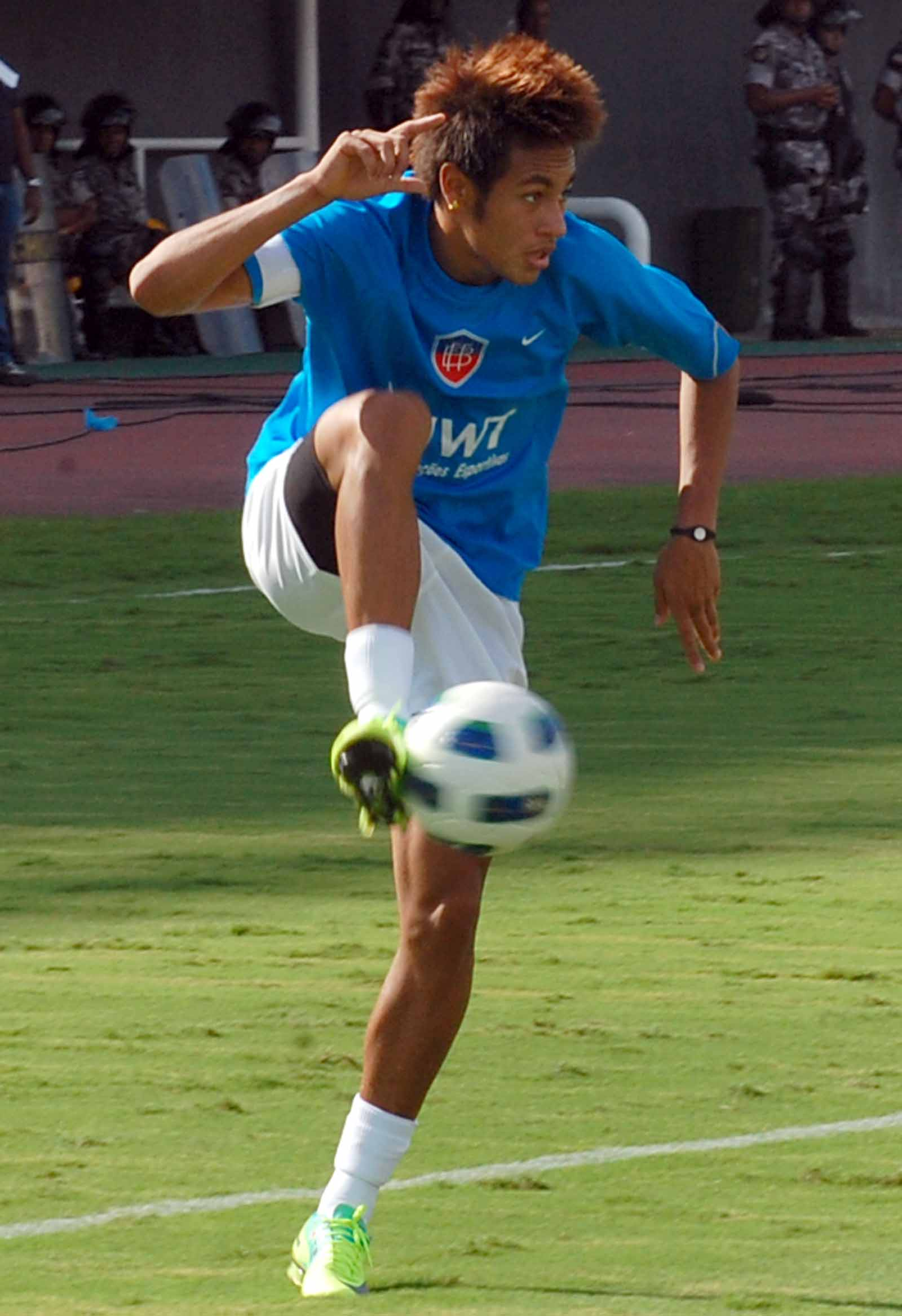
Neymar controlling the ball in an exhibition match in 2011

Primarily playing as an attacking midfielder or winger, Neymar is prolific in scoring and has high-level playmaking abilities. He has scored over 450 goals and has registered over 250 assists. For much of his early career, including at Santos and Barcelona, he was usually deployed on the left side of a front three for both club and country in a 4–3–3 formation due to his pace and playmaking skills; this position allowed him to shoot with his stronger foot and create chances for teammates. His main traits are his vision, agility, passing, finishing, dribbling, feints, and first touch, being described as both "electric" and "explosive". He is also known for often using the rainbow flick. Neymar is two-footed and can score free-kicks and penalties.

Considered to be a highly promising player in his youth, Neymar was described early in his career by the media as "a true phenomenon". At Santos, Neymar was renowned for his explosive pace and flair, often beating defenders with ease and showcasing excessive skill moves — frequently bordering on showboating. At Barcelona, he became more efficient in providing and more refined, improving his passing and overall decision-making. After joining PSG, he evolved into a complete number 10, capable of dictating play and executing highly difficult passes. Reflecting on his years at PSG, Neymar said that he experienced his prime years at the club; in 2021, a journalist said that PSG "relies almost entirely on his creative genius".

According to a writer for Goal, Neymar "is a master dribbler, and he sees openings that other players don't. He can create chances out of nothing and more often than not, has the finishing touch or decisive final pass to match his ingenuity on the ball." A sports writer for Forbes praised him as "an increasingly rare phenomenon in a modern game of academy-refined talent", whilst another of The Independent opined that Messi was the only player superior in "every facet of the game" to him during his 10-year tenure in Europe.

Neymar's playing style has often made him a target for rough treatment from defenders. A report in early 2022 revealed that he was the most fouled player in Europe since 2016. During his time in Ligue 1, he was fouled more than any other player, which caused frequent injuries.

=== Reception ===
Neymar has drawn high praise from current and former players, with many either calling him one of the greatest players of all time, the best player they have played with, or the best player they have ever seen. (Note: Many sources for this from top level footballing figures:) David Beckham praised him as "an outstanding talent, a once-in-a-generation type of footballer who has fans on their feet whenever he gets the ball." In the view of Thierry Henry, Neymar changed football with the way he plays. Deco said that Neymar "plays beautiful football" and is "one of the greatest". Rio Ferdinand said that Neymar "could do things that no other player in the world could do." When asked who his top five favourite dribblers are, Benzema responded "Neymar, and that's all." In 2015, Pierre-Emerick Aubameyang was asked in an interview which one player he would like his club Dortmund to sign, to which he answered "Neymar".

In 2022, sports writer Jonathan Wilson summarised Neymar:

"As a great who has been burdened by his talent [...] someone whose transfers torpedoed Barcelona and initiated the boom-and-bust cycle of the past four years, it is Neymar, more than anybody else who embodies the age."

Many players have cited Neymar as the toughest opponent they have faced in their career. Despite still being in his early 30s, players of the new era of football have singled out Neymar's influence, with many calling him their idol. After being congratulated by Marcelo following PSG's Champions League final win in 2025, Désiré Doué said to him "say hello to Neymar, he's my idol”. Similarly, following Spain's triumph at the 2026 World Cup, Nico Williams dedicated the victory to his "idol" Neymar.

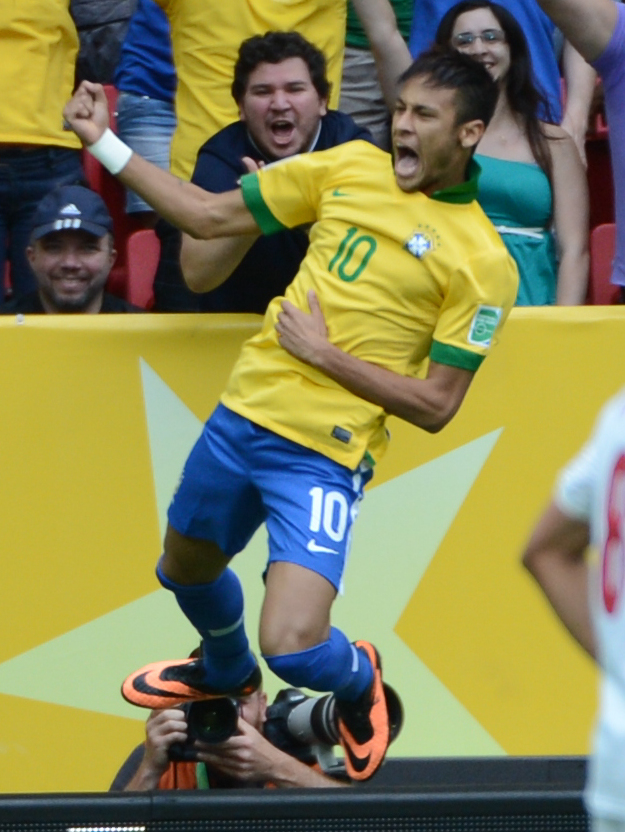
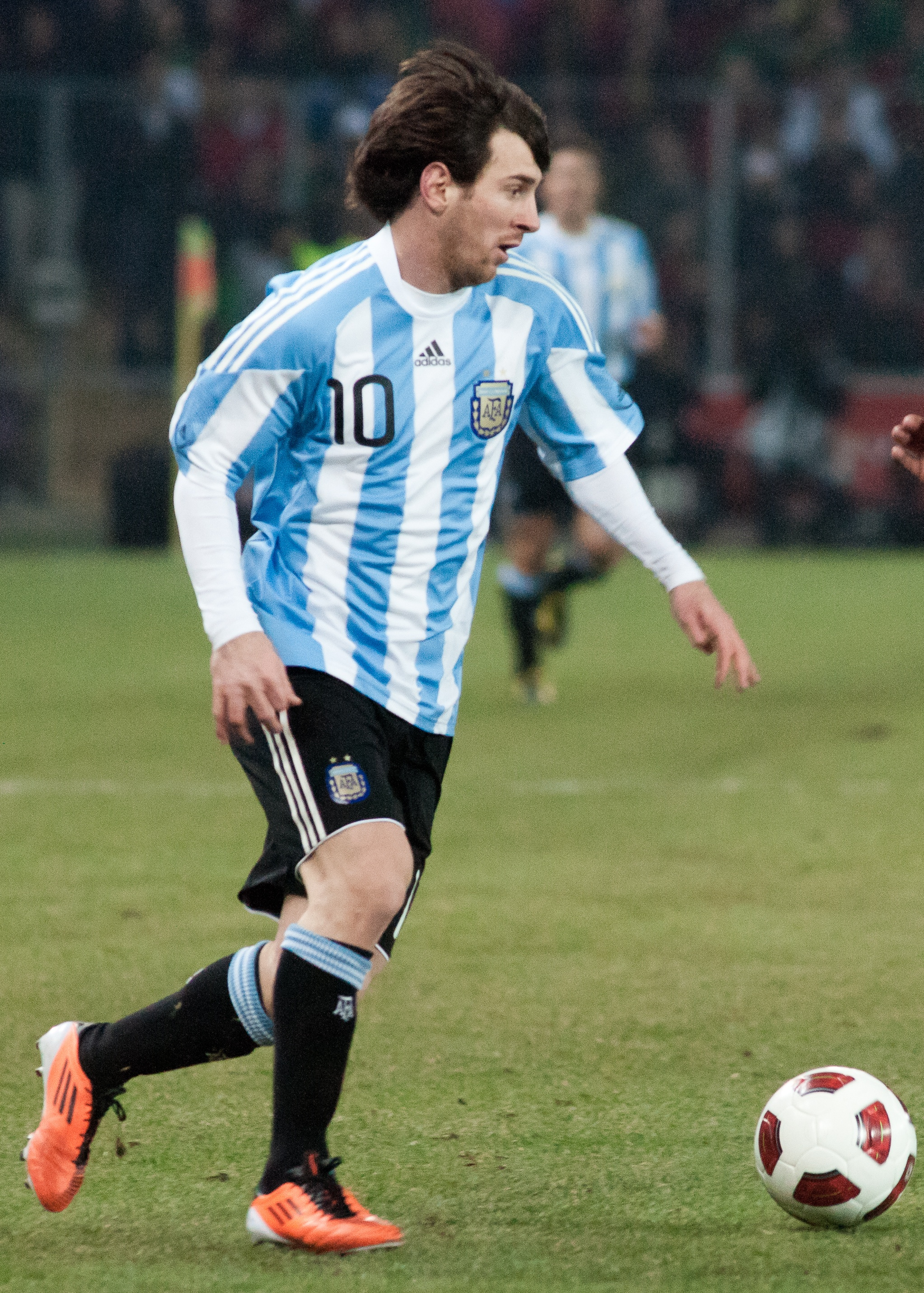
Despite the dominance of the Messi–Ronaldo rivalry, some regarded Neymar as one of the two best players in the world with Messi.

In 2017, Neymar was "universally deemed football's best player after Ronaldo and Messi" according to Sports Illustrated, however, some have regarded him as second only to Messi — or even his equal. (Note: Many sources for this:) Opta Sports performance statistics showed that Neymar finished above second place Messi as the best-performing player in Europe in 2016–17 and 2017–18. He has also been hailed as being on the same level as Messi and Ronaldo and was considered the best player in the world at various points in his career. Goal credited Neymar as among the most talented players ever.

The term Neymardependencia (Neymar dependency) is often used in Brazil to refer to the extent to which the national team relies on him to guide their success. In 2014, the Associated Press said "despite being only 22 years old, Neymar has already done enough to be ranked among Brazil’s greatest players of all time." According to a writer for The Guardian, Neymar was "carrying a relatively weak Brazil side for much of his career under immense pressure." 1970 FIFA World Cup champion Tostão opinionated that Neymar is better than Ronaldo, Romário, Rivaldo, and Kaká because he "does everything during a game". In the view of GiveMeSport, he might be considered the best Brazilian player of all time if he shone in an era without Messi and Ronaldo. In Brazil, he is often referred to as O Príncipe ('The Prince'), a title that reflects a symbolic parallel to Pelé, who is widely known as O Rei ('The King').

Neymar has also been praised by managers, including José Mourinho, who said that the unprecedented €222 million transfer fee to sign Neymar in 2017 was not expensive for a player of his caliber. Liverpool manager Jürgen Klopp drew attention to the threat of Neymar ahead of PSG's first match against Liverpool of the Champions League group stage in September 2018: "We'll try to avoid passes to him. We'll try to avoid him winning challenges [...] He's a fantastic footballer, an outstanding player." Ahead of the Champions League semi-final in 2021, Man City's manager Pep Guardiola called him "a joy to watch".

==== Ballon d'Or disappointment ====
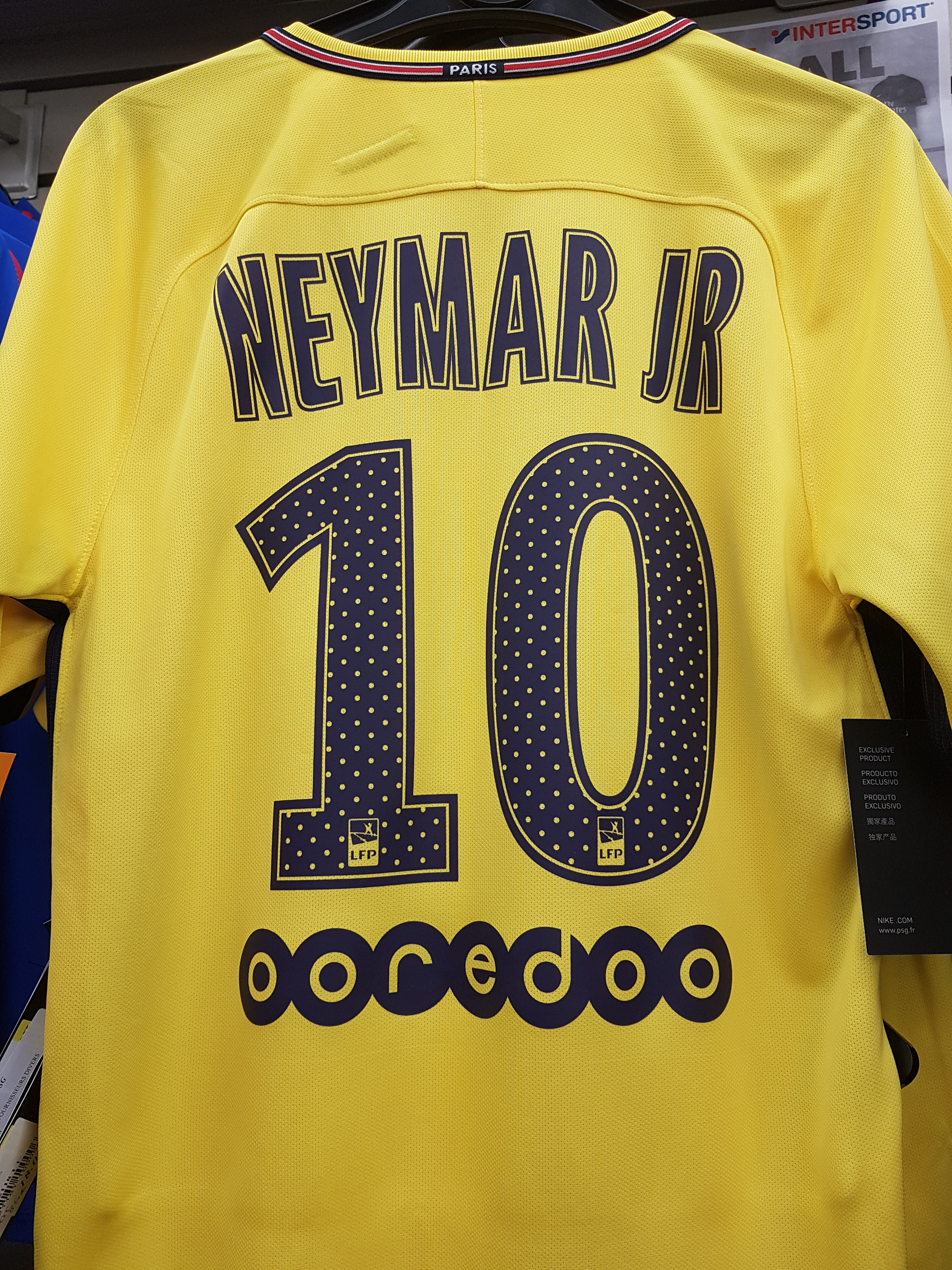
Neymar's failure to win the Ballon d'Or is generally viewed as a disappointment in his career.

Early in his career, particularly after his stellar 2014–15 season with Barcelona at 23 years old, Neymar was unanimously expected to win the Ballon d'Or at some point in his career. He has been nominated for the Ballon d'Or nine times, which is more than any other Brazilian player in history except Ronaldo, who he is tied with, and has finished in the top 10 six times — only Thierry Henry, Zidane, Mbappé, Messi, and Cristiano Ronaldo have more. In 2023, following his departure from Europe to Saudi Arabia at a young age (31) without winning the Ballon d'Or, various media outlets dubbed Neymar as the 'Prince who never became King'.

Sports Illustrated said in 2019 that Neymar could end his career as the best player never to win a Ballon d'Or, joining the likes of Henry and Iniesta. Others have also expressed surprise that Neymar has never won the Ballon d'Or, including former goalkeeper Gianluigi Buffon, who opinionated that he should have won at least five Ballon d'Ors. Thomas Meunier, who played with him at PSG, said that it is a "pity" that that he did not win a Ballon d'Or. Former Manchester United defender Axel Tuanzebe, who faced Neymar, claimed that he should have won all the Ballon d’Ors from 2017 onwards.

=== Criticisms ===
"And so, circus Neymar arrived in Dortmund. The Brazilian's moods, histrionics, petulance, and goalscoring prowess were on view in every fascinating and exasperating detail."

— Forbes on some of the traits associated with Neymar following a Champions League game for PSG against Borussia Dortmund, February 2020.

Neymar has been known and criticised for his excessive diving when tackled by another player. Brazilian legend Pelé has said, "[h]e is a player with a body that can't take a lot of hits. [...] A lot of times he will fall because he can't do anything else, but he was overdoing it." He continued: "Even when he is fouled, he can't make a spectacle out of it". During the 2018 World Cup, Neymar inspired the "Neymar Challenge" on social media due to his dramatic dives. As the star player for Brazil and PSG, he was often the most targeted player on the field; in 2018, he was the most fouled player in the top five leagues. A divisive figure in the sport, he has been accused of exaggerating injury, with Eric Cantona stating Neymar is a "great actor", comparing him to a wheeled suitcase: "you barely touch it, and it turns round and round for hours." In response to the criticism over his petulance and histrionics, Neymar starred in a commercial after the 2018 World Cup where he said that he wasn't able to control his frustrations, which contributed to his theatrics, and he promised to change for the better.

Neymar has also been criticised for his lack of professional discipline, with his desire to party and play late-night poker games. In 2018, Pelé criticised Neymar: "It's difficult to defend Neymar for all the things he does besides playing football. I've been with him in Europe twice. We talked and I explained: 'The God of football gave you the gift. What you do complicates it'." In February 2023, the day after PSG lost to Bayern Munich in the first leg of the Champions League round of 16, images of Neymar in a fast-food restaurant surfaced on social media. Neymar defended himself, saying "It's my life, I do what I want."

In a 2025 interview, Neymar responded to the claims that he did not reach the heights expected of him: "Many things happened, I had many injuries that cost me a lot in my career". In spite of this, he expressed, "I achieved almost everything I dreamed of, and I even achieved things I never dreamed of." Wilson of Sports Illustrated gives the view that, "The early hype [around Neymar] was absurd, and if he has not lived up to it, it is largely because nobody could have."

== Outside football ==
=== Media ===
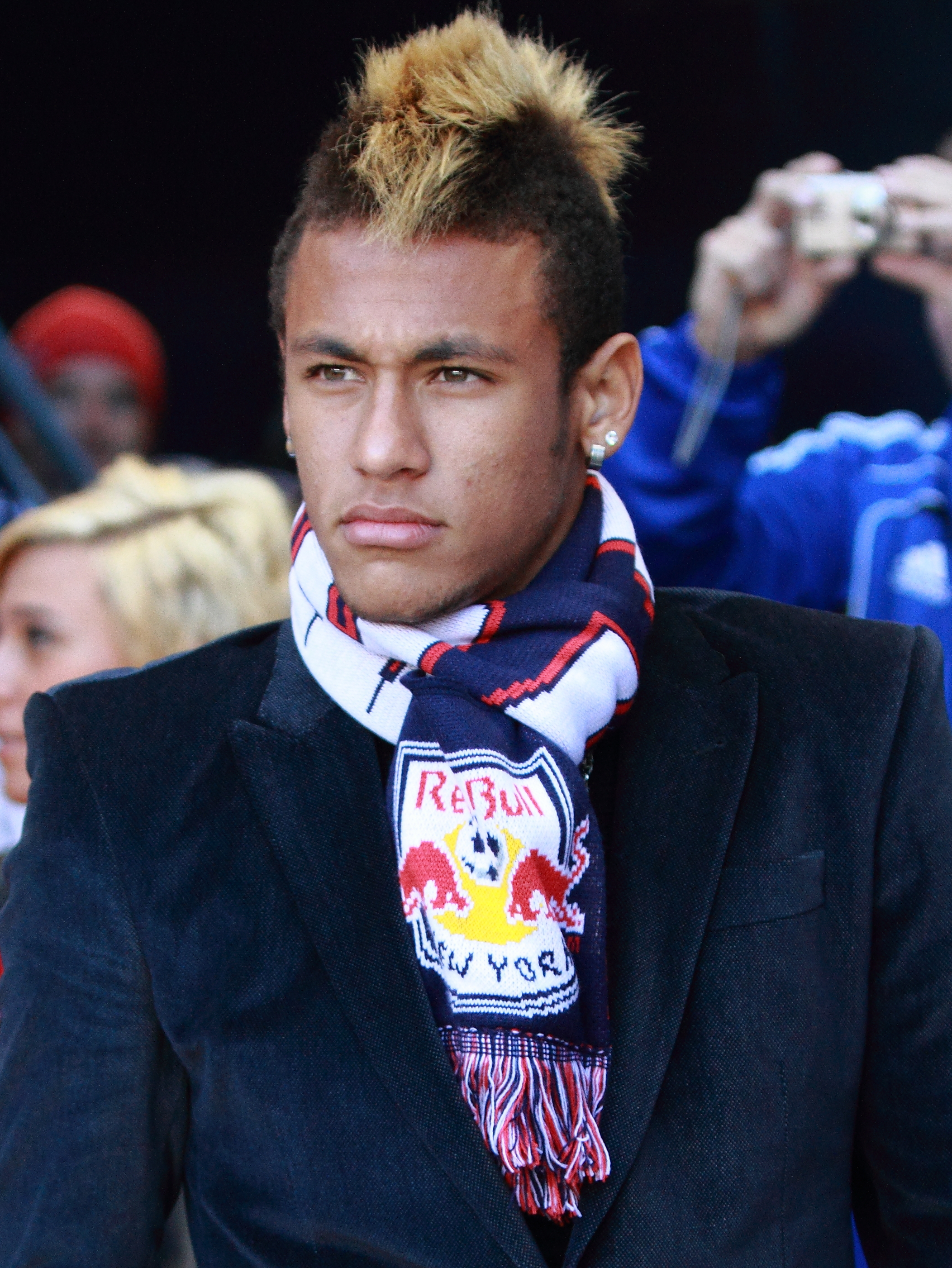
Neymar at the Red Bull Arena in Harrison, New Jersey during a match between New York Red Bulls and LA Galaxy in 2011

Neymar was featured on the front covers of the video games Pro Evolution Soccer 2012 and Pro Evolution Soccer 2013 on the North American version, after Konami Digital Entertainment announced that he had joined Pro Evolution Soccer. Neymar joined Ronaldo as a featured cover athlete. Neymar also features in EA Sports' FIFA video game series, with the trailer for FIFA 18 showing him in his PSG home jersey. He appeared alongside Ronaldo on the Champions and Ultimate Edition packs for FIFA 19, where Neymar's "Hang Loose" goal celebration also features in the game. Neymar also appears as a playable operator in the 2022 first-person shooter Call of Duty: Modern Warfare II alongside fellow football players Paul Pogba and Messi, whose character models were released as downloadable content to coincide with the 2022 FIFA World Cup.

Neymar appeared on the cover of Time magazine in February 2013, the first Brazilian athlete to do so. The issue included an article by Ghosh entitled "The Next Pelé" and subtitled "How the career of Brazilian football star Neymar explains his country's economy". In 2017, he was the only footballer included in the Time 100 Most Influential People list.

Controversy erupted because of a cover by Brazilian football magazine Placar that depicted Neymar on a cross. The title read "A Crucificação de Neymar" (the Crucifixion of Neymar) and subtitled: "the Brazilian ace turns scapegoat in a sport where everyone plays dirty".

In April 2013, Brazilian cartoonist Mauricio de Sousa released a Monica's Gang comic book featuring a younger version of Neymar (called Neymar Jr.) as the main character.

In May 2013, SportsPro magazine named Neymar as the most marketable athlete on the planet for the second consecutive year. He topped the list ahead of Lionel Messi, Rory McIlroy, Usain Bolt and Ronaldo, among other sportspeople. The list measures the monetary value, the age, the force in domestic markets, the charisma and their market potential in the next three years. In March 2015, Neymar had the fourth highest social media rank in the world among sportspeople, behind Ronaldo, Messi and Beckham, with 52 million Facebook fans. He has over 200 million Instagram followers, the third highest for a sportsperson (after Ronaldo and Messi), and inside the top 20 most followed people. In ESPN's list of active sportspeople in 2016, Neymar was ranked the fourth most famous athlete in the world. In April 2017, Neymar was included in the Time 100, Time magazine's list of the most influential people in the world. In 2019, ESPN again ranked him the world's fourth most famous athlete.

To mark the World Cup commencing in Brazil, in June 2014, Neymar appeared with supermodel Gisele Bündchen on the front cover of Vogue's Brazilian edition. In November 2014, Neymar appeared in FIFA's "11 against Ebola" campaign with a selection of top football players from around the world, including Ronaldo, Gareth Bale, Xavi and Didier Drogba. Under the slogan "Together, we can beat Ebola", FIFA's campaign was done in conjunction with the Confederation of African Football and health experts, with the players holding up eleven messages to raise awareness of the disease and ways to combat it.

In collaboration with DAZN, in 2019 Neymar appeared in The Making Of series, documentaries which relives the significant games that helped define football's greatest modern icons, with Neymar recounting his performance for Santos against Flamengo in 2011 when he scored that year's FIFA Puskás Award for Goal of the Year, and also the film Neymar and the Line of King which covers Neymar's journey in becoming one of Brazil's top players.

In December 2021, he signed a deal with Facebook Gaming. He was also the subject of a 2022 Netflix documentary series titled Neymar: The Perfect Chaos.

In June 2024, Neymar Jr. was appointed brand ambassador for Blaze's exclusive "crash" online gaming product, promoting the sports betting platform's new multiplier‐based wager.

=== Music ===
Neymar has become an icon in promoting Brazilian modern pop music, particularly Música sertaneja. The video in which Neymar dances in the Santos locker room in front of teammates carrying his recorder making the round of the players and making them react to the tune of Michel Teló's hit "Ai se eu te pego!" went viral. He made a point of performing his dance antics to the song after scoring goals in football games and appeared live with Teló in one of the latter's concerts. He also supported sertanejo singer Gusttavo Lima performing live with Lima on renditions of the singer's hits "Balada" and "Fazer Beber". In 2012, he made cameo appearances in the music video for yet another sertanejo hit "Eu Quero Tchu, Eu Quero Tcha" by João Lucas & Marcelo. In 2013, Neymar appeared on a rap music video, "País do Futebol" by MC Guimê.

=== Television and films ===
Year	Title	Role	Note(s)	Type
2010	Malhação	Himself	TV Globo	TV
2012	(fdp)	Encanador	—	TV series (TV)
2013	Carrossel	Himself	SBT	TV
2016	Neymar: The Making Of A Superstar	Himself	—	Short Documentary
2017	Os Parças	Himself	—	Full-length film (FL)
2017	XXX: Return of Xander Cage	Himself	—	Full-length film (FL)
2019	Money Heist	Monje Joao	3 episodes (season 3)	TV
2021	Neymar Jr. and the line of kings	Himself	DAZN presents	Documentary
2022	Neymar: The Perfect Chaos	Himself	Netflix	Docuseries

== Personal life ==
=== Religion ===
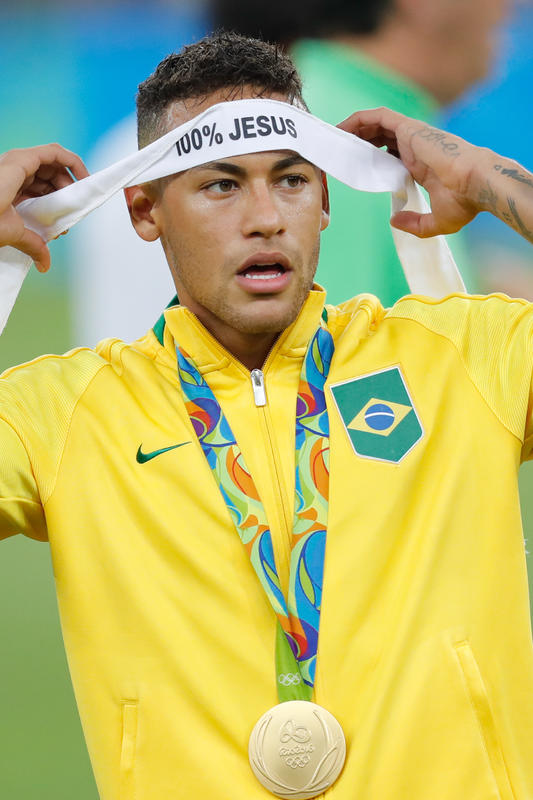
Neymar with a "100% Jesus" headband while representing Brazil at the 2016 Summer Olympics

Neymar is a Christian and he was baptised at Peniel Baptist Church in Santos in 2008. He speaks regularly about his faith. Neymar has said about his faith: "Life only makes sense when our highest ideal is to serve Christ!". Additionally, he has worn a headband with the words "100% Jesus". Neymar also tithes some of his income to his church and has named Kaká as his religious role model.

=== Relationships and children ===
Neymar was in a relationship with Brazilian actress Bruna Marquezine.

He has fathered four children with three different women, including a son and three daughters. Since 2022, he has been in an on-and-off relationship with Bruna Biancardi from São Paulo with whom he has two daughters.

=== Charity ===
Every year, Neymar organises a charity match with fellow Brazilian footballer Nenê in Nenê's hometown of Jundiaí, with the purpose of raising food for poor families. In addition to his native Portuguese, Neymar also speaks Spanish.

=== Wealth and sponsorships ===
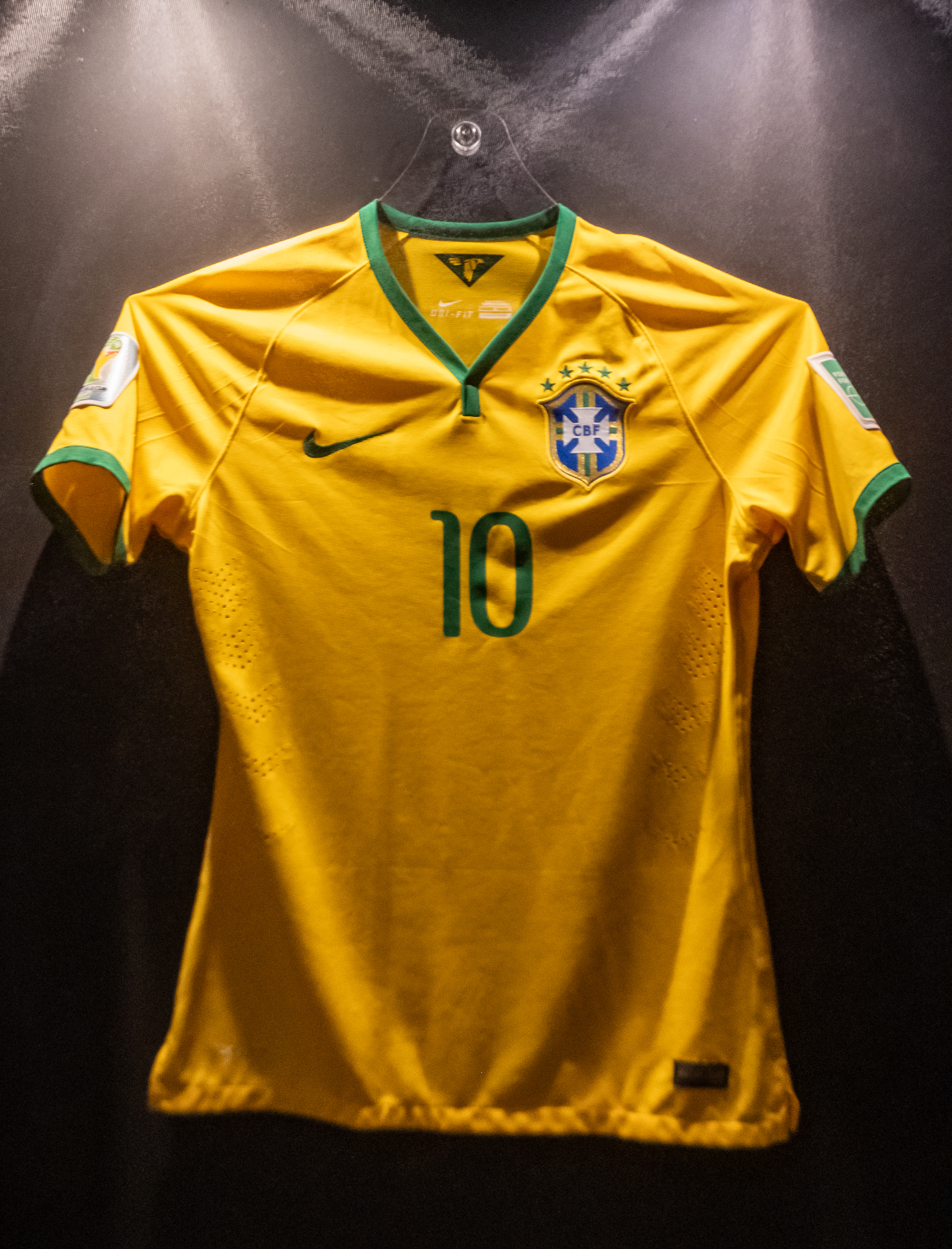
Neymar's 2014 World Cup jersey on display at an exhibition in the Franz Mayer Museum, Mexico City.

Neymar has signed many sponsorships since his reputation began to grow from the age of 17. In March 2011, he signed an 11-year contract with American sportswear company Nike, which ended in August 2020 after a Nike employee made a sexual assault complaint against him. Since then, Neymar has signed with Puma. He adopted the famous PUMA King boots, previously worn by the likes of Pelé, Maradona, Johan Cruyff, and Eusébio. Neymar's deal with Puma was considered the highest-value individual football boot contract ever, with him earning around €25 million per year, surpassing deals held by the likes of Ronaldo and Messi. In March 2011, Panasonic paid US$2.4 million to secure Neymar's services for two years. In 2012, France Football had ranked Neymar 13th in its list of the world's richest players, with total earnings of $18.8 million for the previous 12 months. He has also signed other sponsorships from Volkswagen, Tenys Pé Baruel, Lupo, Ambev, Claro, Unilever, and Santander.

In 2019, Forbes ranked Neymar the world's third-highest-paid athlete (after Messi and Ronaldo) with earnings of $105 million for the year; he was also ranked fourth in 2020 ($95.5 million) and 2021 ($95 million), seventh in 2024 ($108 million), twelfth in 2023 ($85 million) and 25th in 2025 ($76 million). Sportico named him the fourth highest-paid athlete of 2022 and put him at sixth place in 2021, 2023 and 2024. In 2018, France Football ranked Neymar the third-highest-paid footballer in the world, earning a total income for €81.5m ($95m) for the year.

On 8 May 2013, Neymar was named by SportsPro magazine as the most marketable athlete in the world, ahead of Messi (2nd) and Ronaldo (8th). The same month, Neymar launched the Nike Hypervenom football boot. In November 2012, advertising agency Loducca created Neymar's own personal brand logo, featuring the N, J, and R (Neymar Junior) with the N styled to match Neymar's shirt number 11. Neymar starred in a 2014 advert for Beats alongside other football stars such as Henry and Suárez, with the theme of 'The Game Before The Game' and the players pre-game ritual of listening to music. In 2018, Neymar was highly influential to PSG’s groundbreaking partnership with Air Jordan. In June 2016, he became the first footballer ever to wear Air Jordan-branded boots—a custom Air Jordan V Hypervenom—establishing an early and personal connection with Air Jordan. That relationship set the stage for the 2018 PSG × Air Jordan launch. Neymar himself described Air Jordan as "phenomenal, magic, irreverent," calling it a perfect fit for both Paris and the Champions League.

In the later stages of his career, Neymar has been regularly seen playing high limit poker, including live streamed celebrity games from California's Hustler Casino. In 2025, boxer Conor Benn called out his rival boxer Chris Eubank Jr. at a pre-fight press conference, alleging Eubank Jr. owed Neymar £4 million in poker debts. Around May 2025, a 31 year old anonymous Brazilian billionaire from Porto Alegre left Neymar over $1 billion in his will, saying he had not wanted to give his money to the government or his estranged family. The billionaire had claimed Neymar’s relationship with his father reminded him of his own, who is deceased. He also had stated that he saw Neymar to “not be greedy”. The will was formalized on June 12, 2025

=== Legal ===
In July 2019, police announced that a rape investigation against Neymar would be dropped due to insufficient evidence. On 2 September 2020, it was reported that Neymar, along with PSG teammates Ángel Di María and Leandro Paredes, tested positive for COVID-19. The French sports newspaper L'Équipe said that the three players reportedly went on vacation in Ibiza. As a result, they were quarantined for one week, and the rest of the players and working staff were scheduled to take a coronavirus test within the same week.

During a match between PSG and Marseille, Neymar reported being racially abused by Álvaro González, after being sent off for hitting González in the back of the head. The Spanish defender denied making any racist comments towards Neymar. On 16 September, Neymar was handed a two-match ban for his actions; Ligue 1 also began an investigation into the alleged racist comments made by Álvaro. Several days before the decision made by the French league, Spanish radio station Cadena SER claimed to have footage of Neymar racially abusing Marseille player Hiroki Sakai. On 30 September, Ligue 1 decided that both Álvaro and Neymar would receive no suspensions as there was insufficient evidence of their wrongdoings. Additionally, Sakai denied any racist comments from Neymar on social media.

In the summer of 2023, Agence France-Presse, citing local authorities, reported that Neymar faced a potential fine of about $1 million for environmental violations committed during the construction of his Mangaratiba mansion. The process of building his mansion diverted the waterway and used beach sand without permission.

Santos opened an investigation into Neymar after the player allegedly physically assaulted Robinho Júnior by tripping him and giving him a "violent slap to the face" in retaliation for Robinho Júnior dribbling past him during a training session at the CT Rei Pelé on 3 May 2026. Neymar later apologised for the incident, and Robinho Júnior's representatives subsequently gave up on notifying the club.

=== Politics ===
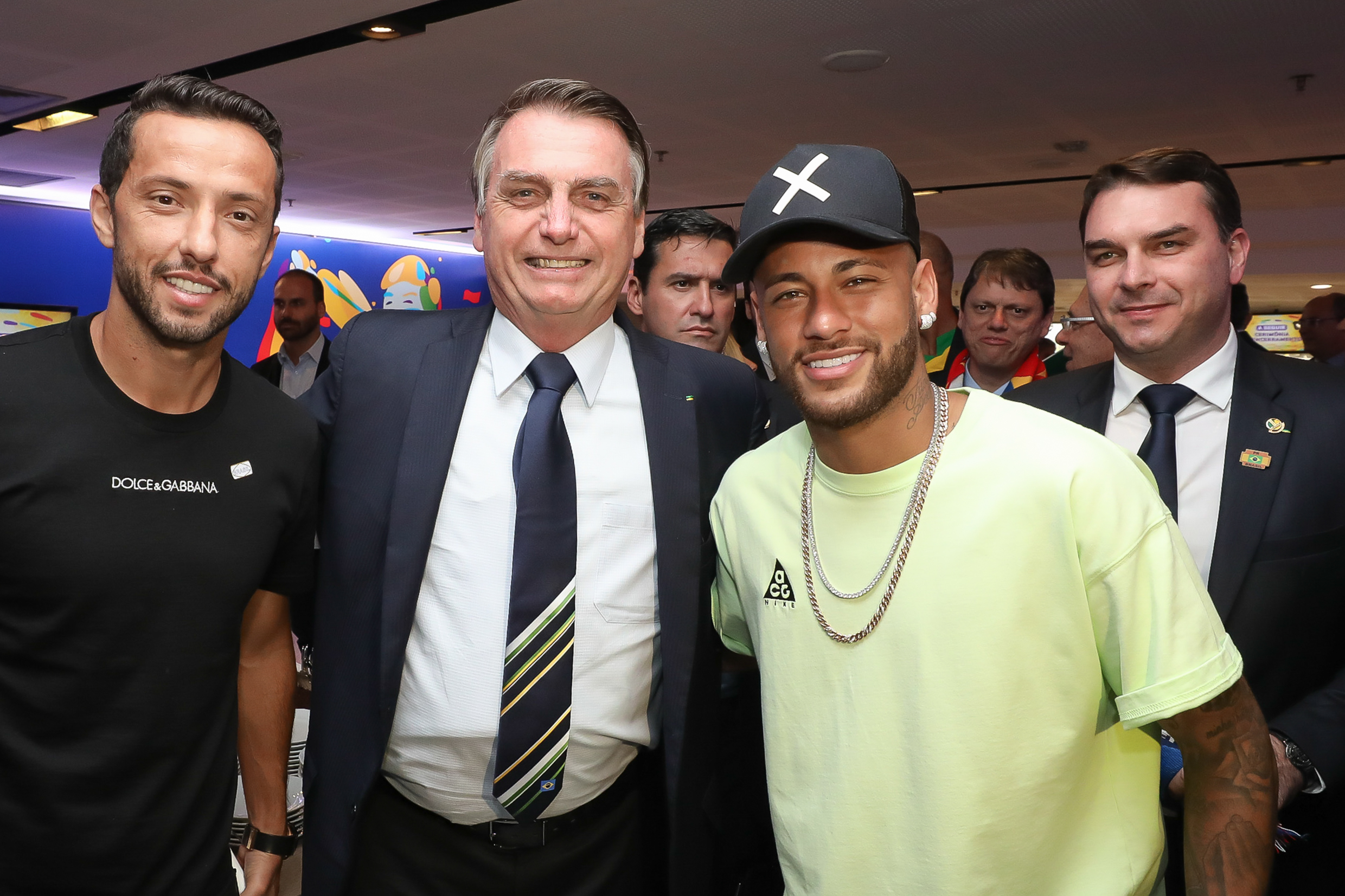
Neymar and Brazilian President Jair Bolsonaro. He supported Bolsonaro in the 2022 Brazilian general election

Neymar supported Brazilian President Jair Bolsonaro in the 2022 Brazilian general election. In the days leading up to the presidential election, Neymar appeared in a TikTok video where he lip-synced a campaign jingle promoting the country's right-wing and socially conservative President Jair Bolsonaro. He received heavy criticism for his endorsement. Bolsonaro was defeated in the election by Luiz Inácio Lula da Silva.

== Career statistics ==
=== Club ===
As of match played 18 November 2026

Appearances and goals by club, season and competition
Club	Season	League			State league (Note: Includes Campeonato Paulista)		National cup (Note: Includes Copa do Brasil, Copa del Rey, Coupe de France)		League cup (Note: Includes Coupe de la Ligue)		Continental		Other		Total	
Club	Season	Division	Apps	Goals	Apps	Goals	Apps	Goals	Apps	Goals	Apps	Goals	Apps	Goals	Apps	Goals
Santos	2009	Série A	33	10	12	3	3	1	—		—		—		48	14
Santos	2010	Série A	31	17	19	14	8	11	—		2 (Note: Appearances in Copa Sudamericana)	0	—		60	42
Santos	2011	Série A	21	13	11	4	—		—		13 (Note: Appearances in Copa Libertadores)	6	2 (Note: Appearances in FIFA Club World Cup)	1	47	24
Santos	2012	Série A	17	14	16	20	—		—		12	8	2 (Note: Appearances in Recopa Sudamericana)	1	47	43
Santos	2013	Série A	1	0	18	12	4	1	—		—		—		23	13
Santos	Total		103	54	76	53	15	13	—		27	14	4	2	225	136
Barcelona	2013–14	La Liga	26	9	—		3	1	—		10 (Note: Appearances in UEFA Champions League)	4	2 (Note: Appearances in Supercopa de España)	1	41	15
Barcelona	2014–15	La Liga	33	22	—		6	7	—		12	10	—		51	39
Barcelona	2015–16	La Liga	34	24	—		5	4	—		9	3	1	0	49	31
Barcelona	2016–17	La Liga	30	13	—		6	3	—		9	4	0	0	45	20
Barcelona	Total		123	68	—		20	15	—		40	21	3	1	186	105
Paris Saint-Germain	2017–18	Ligue 1	20	19	—		1	2	2	1	7	6	—		30	28
Paris Saint-Germain	2018–19	Ligue 1	17	15	—		3	2	1	1	6	5	1 (Note: Appearance in Trophée des Champions)	0	28	23
Paris Saint-Germain	2019–20	Ligue 1	15	13	—		2	2	3	1	7	3	0	0	27	19
Paris Saint-Germain	2020–21	Ligue 1	18	9	—		3	1	—		9	6	1	1	31	17
Paris Saint-Germain	2021–22	Ligue 1	22	13	—		0	0	—		6	0	0	0	28	13
Paris Saint-Germain	2022–23	Ligue 1	20	13	—		2	1	—		6	2	1	2	29	18
Paris Saint-Germain	Total		112	82	—		11	8	6	3	41	22	3	3	173	118
Al-Hilal	2023–24	Saudi Pro League	3	0	—		0	0	—		2 (Note: Appearances in AFC Champions League)	1	0	0	5	1
Al-Hilal	2024–25	Saudi Pro League	0	0	—		0	0	—		2	0	0	0	2	0
Al-Hilal	Total		3	0	—		0	0	—		4	1	0	0	7	1
Santos	2025	Série A	20	8	7	3	1	0	—		—		—		28	11
Santos	2026	Série A	16	8	2	0	5	0	—		5	2	—		28	10
Santos	Total		36	16	9	3	6	0	—		5	2	—		56	21
Career total			377	220	85	57	52	36	6	3	117	60	10	6	647	381

=== International ===
Appearances and goals by national team, year and competition
National team	Year	Competitive		Friendly		Total	
National team	Year	Apps	Goals	Apps	Goals	Apps	Goals
Brazil	2010	0	0	2	1	2	1
Brazil	2011	4 (Note: Appearances in 2011 Copa América)	2	9	5	13	7
Brazil	2012	0	0	12	9	12	9
Brazil	2013	5 (Note: Appearances in 2013 FIFA Confederations Cup)	4	14	6	19	10
Brazil	2014	5 (Note: Appearances in 2014 FIFA World Cup)	4	9	11	14	15
Brazil	2015	4 (Note: Two appearances and one goal in 2015 Copa América, two appearances in 2018 FIFA World Cup qualification)	1	5	3	9	4
Brazil	2016	6 (Note: Appearance(s) in 2018 FIFA World Cup qualification)	4	0	0	6	4
Brazil	2017	6	2	2	1	8	3
Brazil	2018	5 (Note: Appearances in 2018 FIFA World Cup)	2	8	5	13	7
Brazil	2019	0	0	5	1	5	1
Brazil	2020	2 (Note: Appearances in 2022 FIFA World Cup qualification)	3	0	0	2	3
Brazil	2021	13 (Note: Six appearances and two goals in 2021 Copa América, seven appearances and three goals in 2022 FIFA World Cup qualification)	6	0	0	13	6
Brazil	2022	4 (Note: One appearance and one goal in 2022 FIFA World Cup qualification, three appearances and two goals in 2022 FIFA World Cup)	3	4	4	8	7
Brazil	2023	4 (Note: Appearances in 2026 FIFA World Cup qualification)	2	0	0	4	2
Brazil	2024	0	0	0	0	0	0
Brazil	2025	0	0	0	0	0	0
Brazil	2026	2 (Note: Appearance in 2026 FIFA World Cup)	1	0	0	2	1
Total		60	34	70	46	130	80

== Honours ==
=== Santos ===
- Copa do Brasil: 2010
- Copa Libertadores: 2011
- Recopa Sudamericana: 2012
- Campeonato Paulista: 2010, 2011, 2012; runner-up: 2009, 2013
- FIFA Club World Cup runner-up: 2011

=== Barcelona ===
- La Liga: 2014–15, 2015–16
- Copa del Rey: 2014–15, 2015–16, 2016–17; runner-up: 2013–14
- Supercopa de España: 2013
- UEFA Champions League: 2014–15
- FIFA Club World Cup: 2015

=== Paris Saint-Germain ===
- Ligue 1: 2017–18, 2018–19, 2019–20, 2021–22, 2022–23
- Coupe de France: 2017–18, 2019–20, 2020–21; runner-up: 2018–19
- Coupe de la Ligue: 2017–18, 2019–20
- Trophée des Champions: 2018, 2020, 2022
- UEFA Champions League runner-up: 2019–20

=== Al-Hilal ===
- Saudi Pro League: 2023–24

=== Brazil U20 ===
- South American U-20 Championship: 2011

=== Brazil U23 ===
- Summer Olympics gold medal: 2016
- Summer Olympics silver medal: 2012

=== Brazil ===
- FIFA Confederations Cup: 2013
- Copa América runner-up: 2021

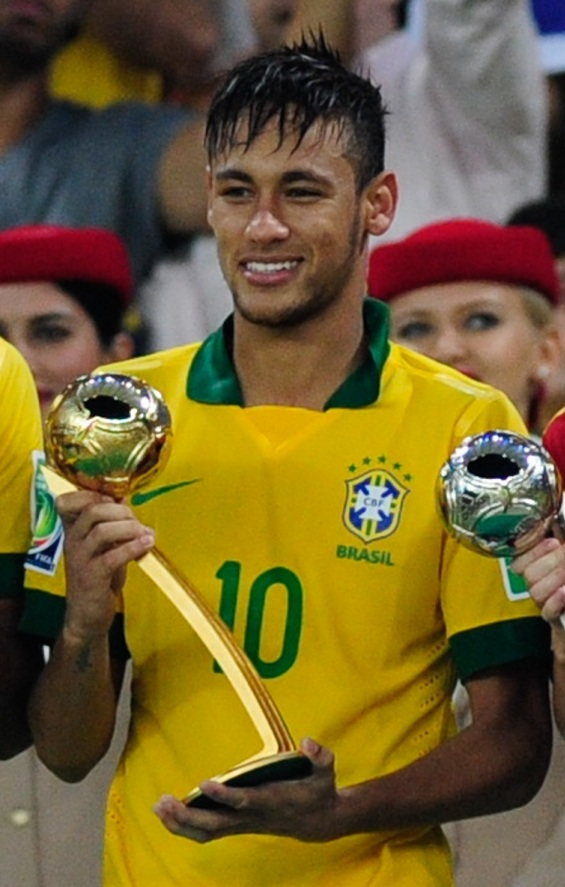
Neymar with the Golden Ball award for best player at the 2013 Confederations Cup

=== Individual awards ===
- Copa do Brasil top scorer: 2010
- Campeonato Brasileiro Série A Team of the Year: 2010, 2011, 2012
- Bola de Prata: 2010, 2011
- Campeonato Brasileiro Série A Best Player: 2011
- Bola de Ouro: 2011, 2012
- Copa Libertadores Best Player: 2011
- Copa Libertadores top assist provider: 2011
- South American U-20 Championship top scorer: 2011
- South American Footballer of the Year: 2011, 2012
- Brazilian Olympic Committee Best Player in Brazil: 2011, 2012
- Troféu Mesa Redonda Best Player: 2011, 2012
- World Soccer Young Player of the Year: 2011
- FIFA Club World Cup Bronze Ball: 2011
- FIFA Puskás Award: 2011
- Campeonato Paulista top scorer: 2012
- Campeonato Paulista Best Player: 2012, 2013
- Copa Libertadores top scorer: 2012 ^{(tied with Matías Alustiza)}
- IFFHS World's Best International Goal Scorer runner-up: 2012, 2014
- FIFA Confederations Cup Final Man of the Match: 2013
- FIFA Confederations Cup Golden Ball: 2013
- FIFA Confederations Cup Bronze Shoe: 2013
- FIFA Confederations Cup Dream Team: 2013
- FIFA World Cup Bronze Boot: 2014
- FIFA World Cup Dream Team: 2014
- L'Équipe World Team: 2014, 2015, 2017, 2020
- Samba de Ouro: 2014, 2015, 2017, 2020, 2021, 2022
- UEFA Champions League top scorer: 2014–15 ^{(tied with Cristiano Ronaldo and Lionel Messi)}
- Copa del Rey top scorer: 2014–15
- La Liga Best American Player: 2014–15
- UEFA Champions League Squad of the Season: 2014–15, 2019–20, 2020–21
- La Liga Player of the Month: November 2015
- FIFA Club World Cup top assist provider: 2015
- L'Équipe Top 100 Players in the World second place: 2015
- FIFA Ballon d'Or/Ballon d'Or third place: 2015, 2017
- FIFA FIFPRO World 11: 2015, 2017
- FIFA FIFPRO World 11 2nd team: 2016, 2018, 2020 squad: 2021, 2022
- UEFA Team of the Year: 2015, 2020
- UEFA Champions League Player of the Week: March 2016, August 2020, December 2020, April 2021
- UEFA Champions League top assist provider: 2015–16, 2016–17
- WhoScored Player of the Season in Europe (performance data by Opta Sports): 2016–17, 2017–18 (Note: Characterised as "Player of the Season" In this report in 2023, where Lionel Messi was the highest-rated player in Europe for 2022–23:) runner-up: 2015–16, 2018–19, 2019–20
- The Best FIFA Men's Player third place: 2017
- IFFHS Men's World Team: 2017
- UNFP Ligue 1 Player of the Month: December 2017, January 2020, August 2022
- Ligue 1 top assist provider: 2017–18
- UNFP Ligue 1 Player of the Year: 2017–18
- UNFP Ligue 1 Team of the Year: 2017–18, 2018–19, 2020–21
- ESM Team of the Year: 2017–18
- Placar Best Brazilian Player Post-Pelé: 2019
- France Football Team of the Decade: 2011–2020
- L'Équipe Best Player in Ligue 1: 2019–20
- UEFA Champions League Forward of the Season third place: 2019–20
- Eurosport Players of the Year second place: 2020
- IFFHS CONMEBOL Team of the Year: 2020, 2021, 2022
- IFFHS CONMEBOL The Best Man Player of the Decade runner-up: 2011–2020
- IFFHS CONMEBOL Team of the Decade: 2011–2020
- CIES Football Observatory Top 10 Players across Europe runner-up: 2020–21
- IFFHS All-time Men's South American Dream Team (B)
- Copa América Golden Ball: 2021^{(joint with Messi)}
- Copa América Team of the Tournament: 2021
- IFFHS Best Playmaker of the Copa América: 2021
- GiveMeSport Brazil's Greatest XI of the 21st Century: 2022
- Globe Soccer Player Career Award: 2024
- Campeonato Paulista Best Goal: 2025
- OneFootball PSG’s Greatest XI of All Time: 2025

== See also ==
- List of top international men's football goalscorers by country
- List of men's footballers with 100 or more international caps
- List of men's footballers with 50 or more international goals
- List of most expensive association football transfers
- Football in Brazil
