= 1987 Copa Libertadores finals =

1987 Copa Libertadores de América finals
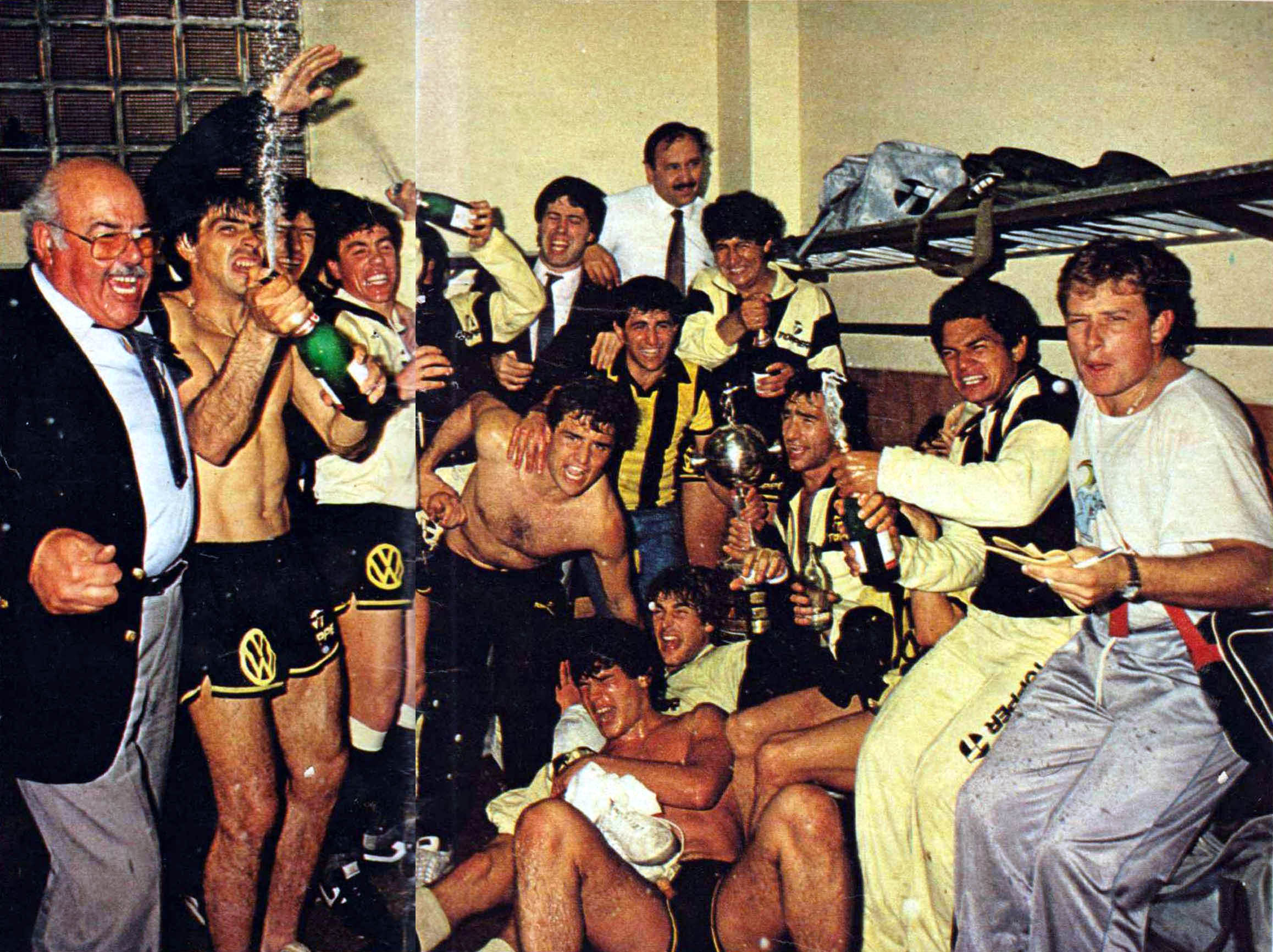
- Peñarol, champions
- Event: 1987 Copa Libertadores
América de Cali	Peñarol
(Colombia)	(Uruguay)
- 2–2 on points, Peñarol won on play-off

First leg
América de Cali	Peñarol
2	0
- Date: 21 October 1987
- Venue: Estadio Pascual Guerrero, Cali
- Referee: José Wright (Brazil)
- Attendance: 65,000

Second leg
Peñarol	América de Cali
2	1
- Date: 28 October 1987
- Venue: Estadio Centenario, Montevideo
- Referee: Ricardo Calabria (Argentina)
- Attendance: 60,000

Play-off
Peñarol	América de Cali
1	0
- After extra time
- Date: 31 October 1987
- Venue: Estadio Nacional, Santiago
- Referee: Silva (Chile)
- Attendance: 25,000

The 1987 Copa Libertadores de América finals was the final two-legged tie to determine the 1987 Copa Libertadores champion. It was contested by Uruguayan club Peñarol and Colombian club América de Cali. The first leg of the tie was played on 21 October at Estadio Olímpico Pascual Guerrero of Cali, while the second leg was played on 28 October at Estadio Centenario in Montevideo.

With both teams having won one game each, a playoff match had to be played at Estadio Nacional in Santiago, Chile. Peñarol became champions there after beating América 1–0 at the end of extra time, winning their fifth Copa Libertadores. As América would have been crowned champions with a tie because of goal difference, Diego Aguirre’s last-minute goal for Peñarol at minute 120 of extra time is considered one of the most emblematic moments in the history of the competition.

== Format ==
The finals were played over two legs; home and away. The team that accumulated the most points —two for a win, one for a draw, zero for a loss— after the two legs were crowned champion. If the two teams were tied on points after the second leg, a playoff at a neutral was to be the next tie-breaker. Goal difference was to be used as a last resort.

== Qualified teams ==
Team	Previous finals app.
(Colombia) América de Cali	2 (1985, 1986)
(Uruguay) Peñarol	8 (**1960**, **1961**, 1962, **1966**, 1965, 1970, **1982**, 1983)

Bold indicates winning years

== Venues ==
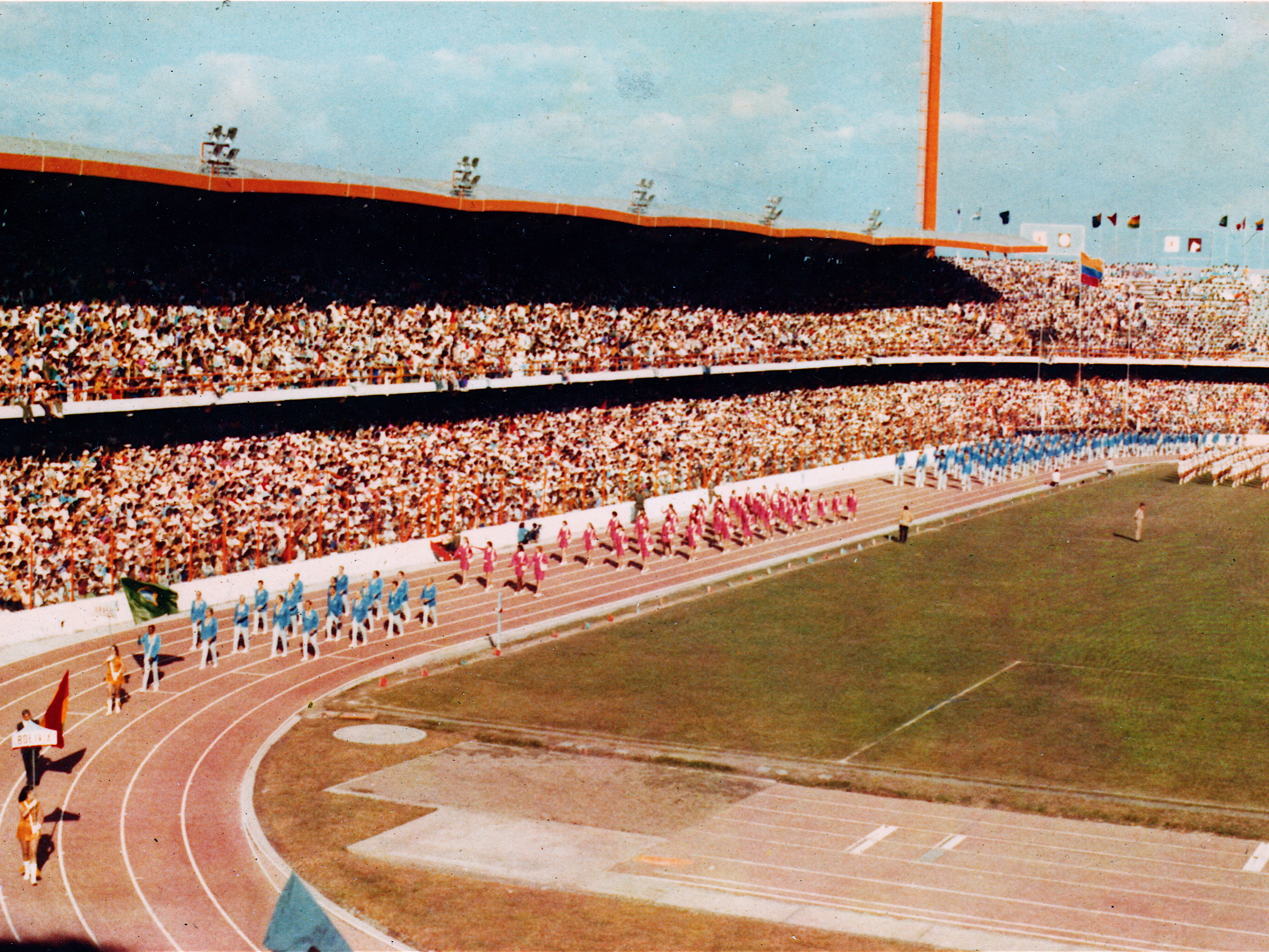
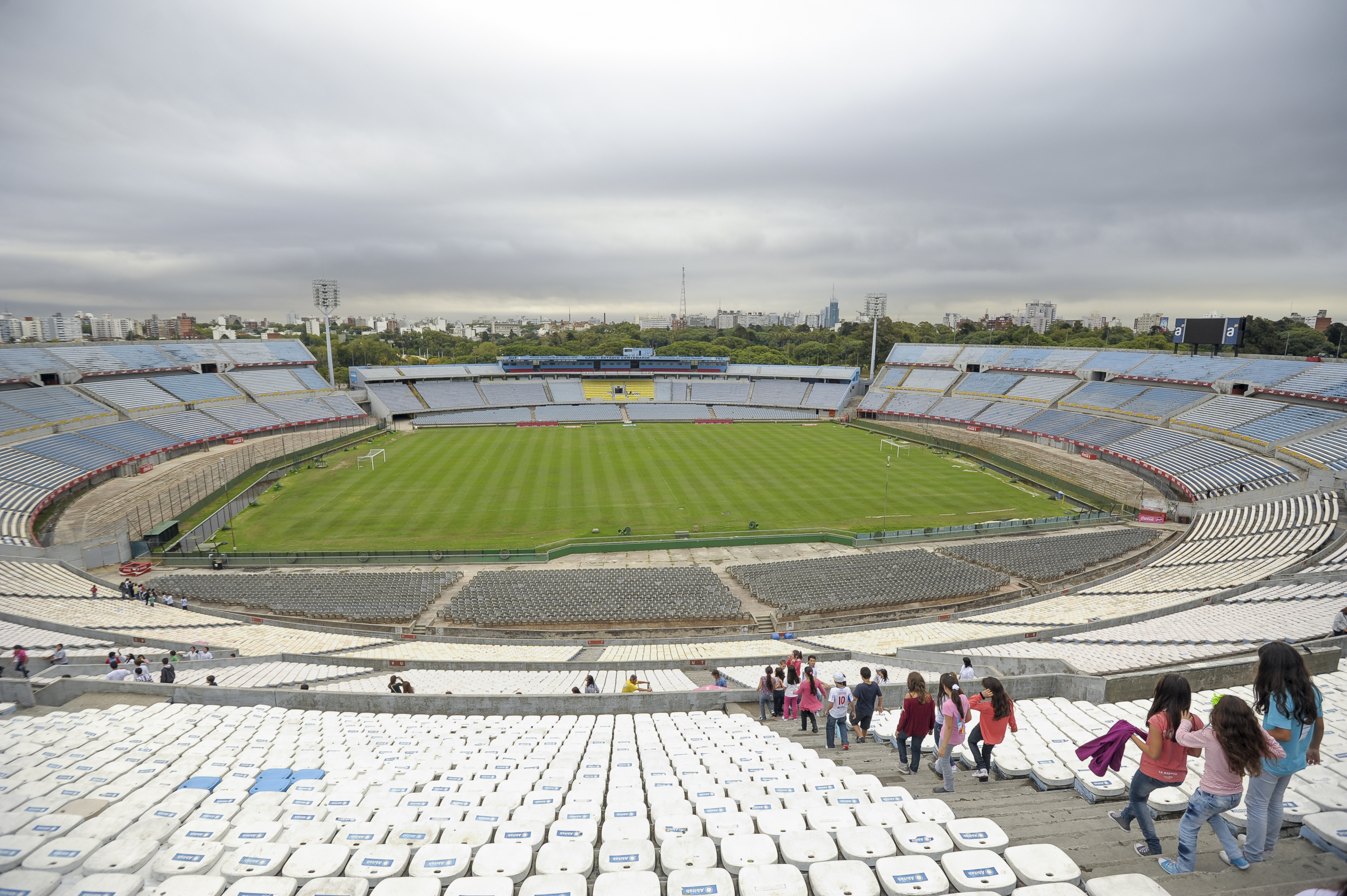
Estadio Pascual Guerrero (left) and Estadio Centenario, venues for the series

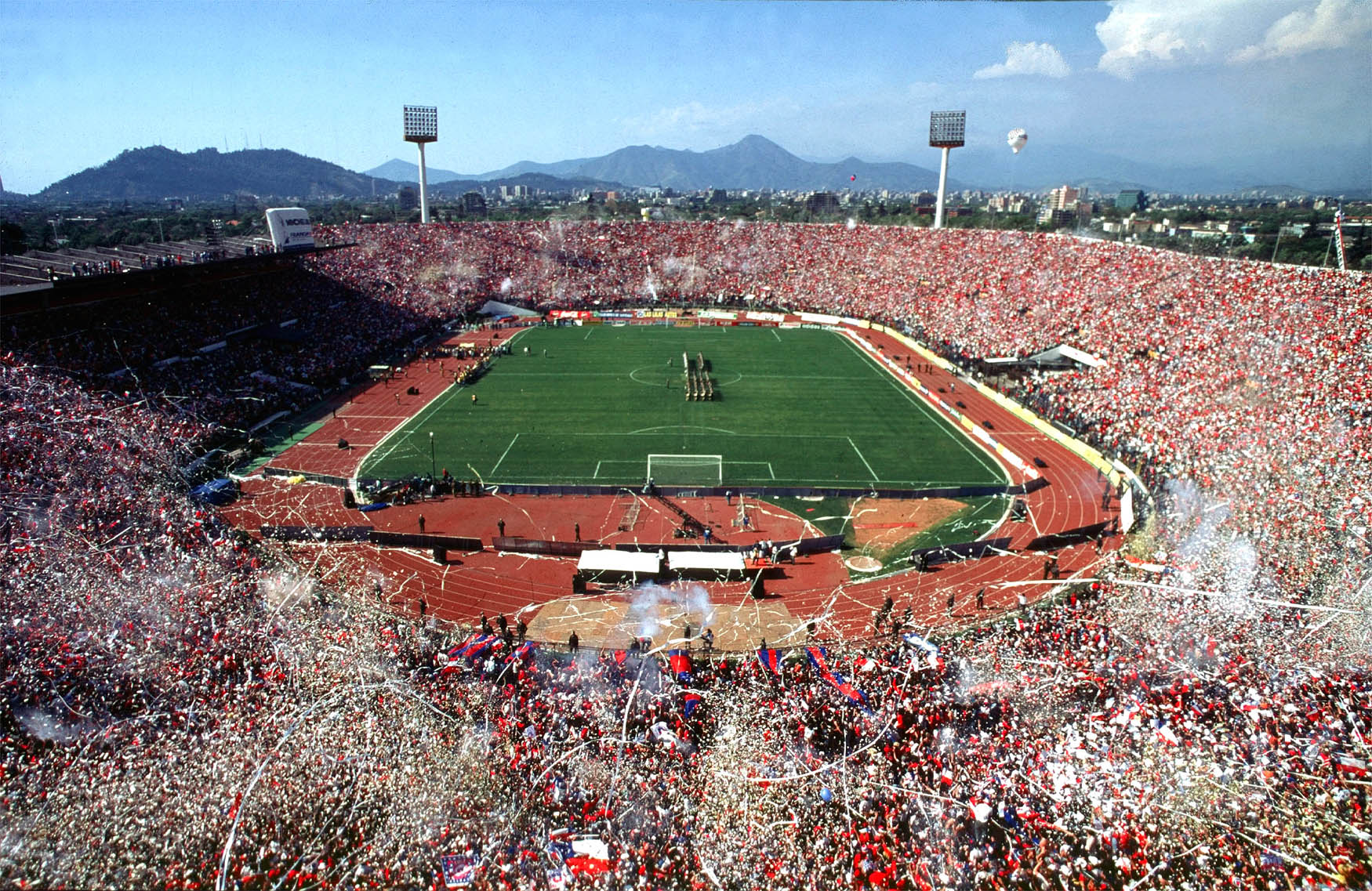
Estadio Nacional, playoff venue

== Match details ==
=== First leg ===
1987 Copa Libertadores finals
21 October 1987
First leg

América de Cali (Colombia)	2–0	(Uruguay) Peñarol
Battaglia; Cabañas	Report

Estadio Pascual Guerrero, Cali
Attendance: 65,000
Referee: José Wright (Brazil)

**América (C)**
**Peñarol**

GK	1	(Argentina) Julio Falcioni
DF	2	(Colombia) Hugo Valencia
DF	3	(Colombia) Víctor Espinosa (c)
DF	13	(Colombia) Álvaro Aponte
DF	4	(Colombia) Jorge Porras
MF	5	(Colombia) Víctor Luna
MF	17	(Uruguay) Sergio Santín
MF	7	(Paraguay) Juan M. Battaglia
MF	18	(Colombia) Hernán D. Herrera	(substituted off) 67'
FW	15	(Argentina) Ricardo Gareca	(substituted off) 69'
FW	10	(Paraguay) Roberto Cabañas
Substitutes:
MF	16	(Colombia) Alexander Escobar	(substituted on) 67'
MF	21	(Colombia) Orlando Maturana	(substituted on) 69'
Manager:
(Colombia) Gabriel Ochoa Uribe

GK	1	(Uruguay) Eduardo Pereira (c)
DF	4	(Uruguay) José Herrera
DF	17	(Uruguay) Marcelo Rotti
DF	3	(Uruguay) Obdulio Trasante
DF	6	(Uruguay) Alfonso Domínguez	(substituted off) 70'
MF	13	(Uruguay) Gustavo Matosas	(substituted off) 29'
MF	5	(Uruguay) José Perdomo
MF	15	(Uruguay) Ricardo Viera
FW	7	(Uruguay) Daniel Vidal
FW	9	(Uruguay) Diego Aguirre
FW	16	(Uruguay) Jorge Cabrera
Substitutes:
MF	10	(Uruguay) Eduardo da Silva	(substituted on) 29'
FW	18	(Uruguay) Jorge Villar	(substituted on) 70'
Manager:
(Uruguay) Oscar Tabárez

=== Second leg ===
28 October 1987
Second leg

Peñarol (Uruguay)	2–1	(Colombia) América de Cali
Aguirre 68'; Villar 87'	Report	Cabañas 19'

Estadio Centenario, Montevideo
Attendance: 60,000
Referee: Ricardo Calabria (Argentina)

**Peñarol**	**América (C)**

GK	1	(Uruguay) Eduardo Pereira (c)
DF	4	(Uruguay) José Herrera
DF	17	(Uruguay) Marcelo Rotti	(substituted off) 81'
DF	3	(Uruguay) Obdulio Trasante
DF	6	(Uruguay) Alfonso Domínguez
MF	10	(Uruguay) Eduardo da Silva
MF	5	(Uruguay) José Perdomo
MF	15	(Uruguay) Ricardo Viera
FW	7	(Uruguay) Daniel Vidal	(substituted off) 64'
FW	9	(Uruguay) Diego Aguirre
FW	16	(Uruguay) Jorge Cabrera
Substitutes:
FW	18	(Uruguay) Jorge Villar	(substituted on) 64'
DF	2	(Uruguay) Jorge Gonçálvez	(substituted on) 81'
Manager:
(Uruguay) Oscar Tabárez

GK	1	(Argentina) Julio Falcioni
DF	2	(Colombia) Hugo Valencia
DF	3	(Colombia) Víctor Espinosa (c)
DF	13	(Colombia) Álvaro Aponte
DF	4	(Colombia) Jorge Porras
MF	9	(Colombia) Willington Ortiz	(substituted off) 79'
MF	5	(Colombia) Víctor Luna
MF	17	(Uruguay) Sergio Santín
MF	7	(Paraguay) Juan M. Battaglia
FW	15	(Argentina) Ricardo Gareca
FW	10	(Paraguay) Roberto Cabañas
Substitutes:
MF	18	(Colombia) Hernán D. Herrera	(substituted on) 79'
Manager:
(Colombia) Gabriel Ochoa Uribe

=== Play-off ===
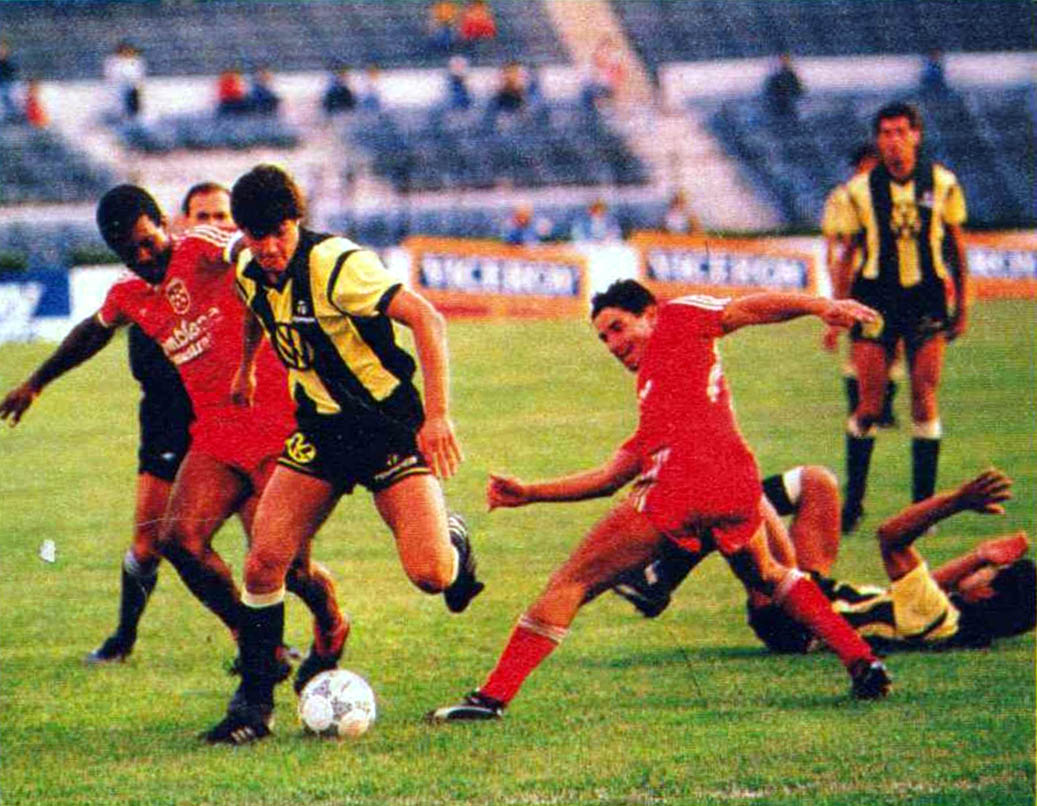
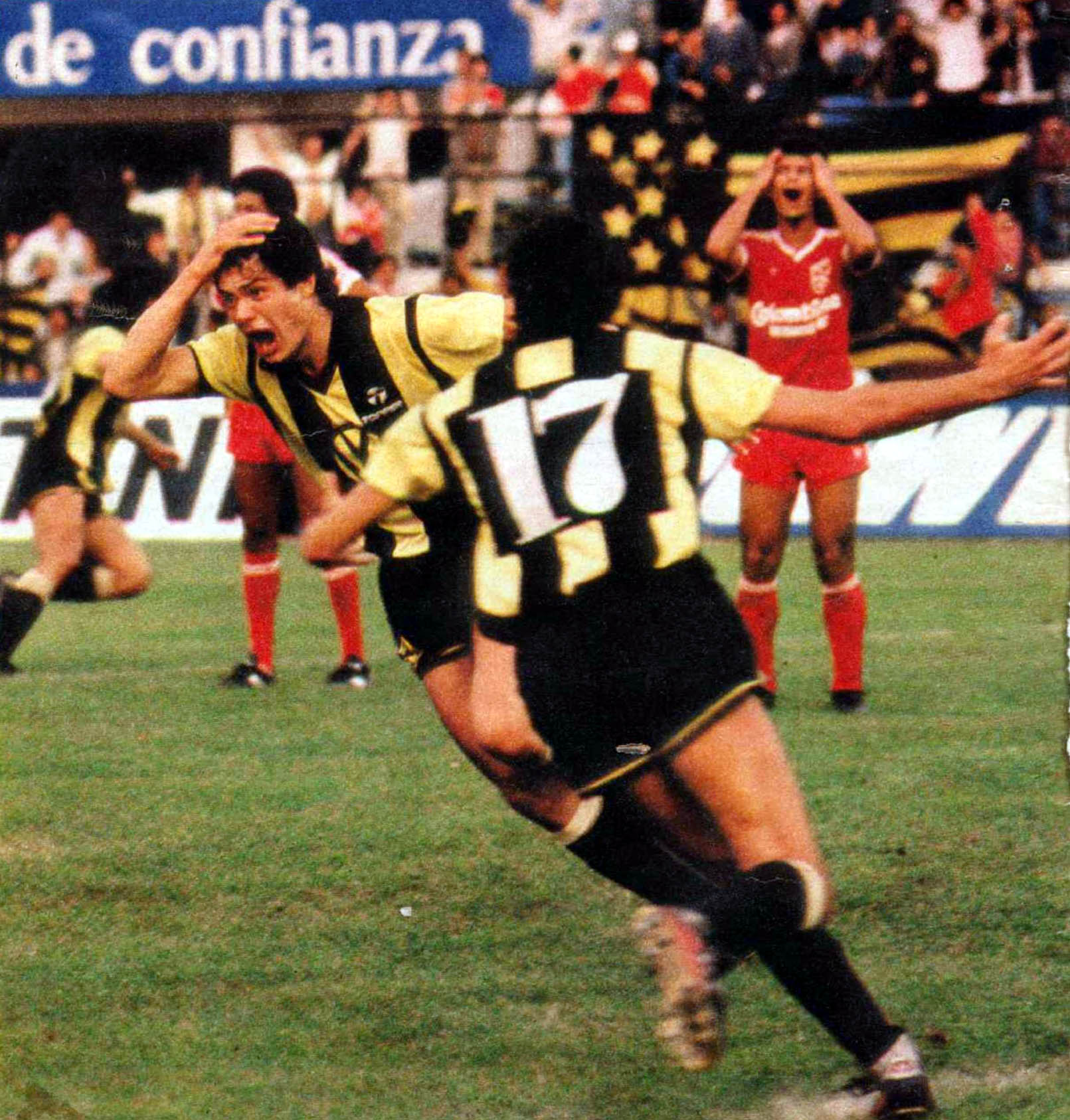
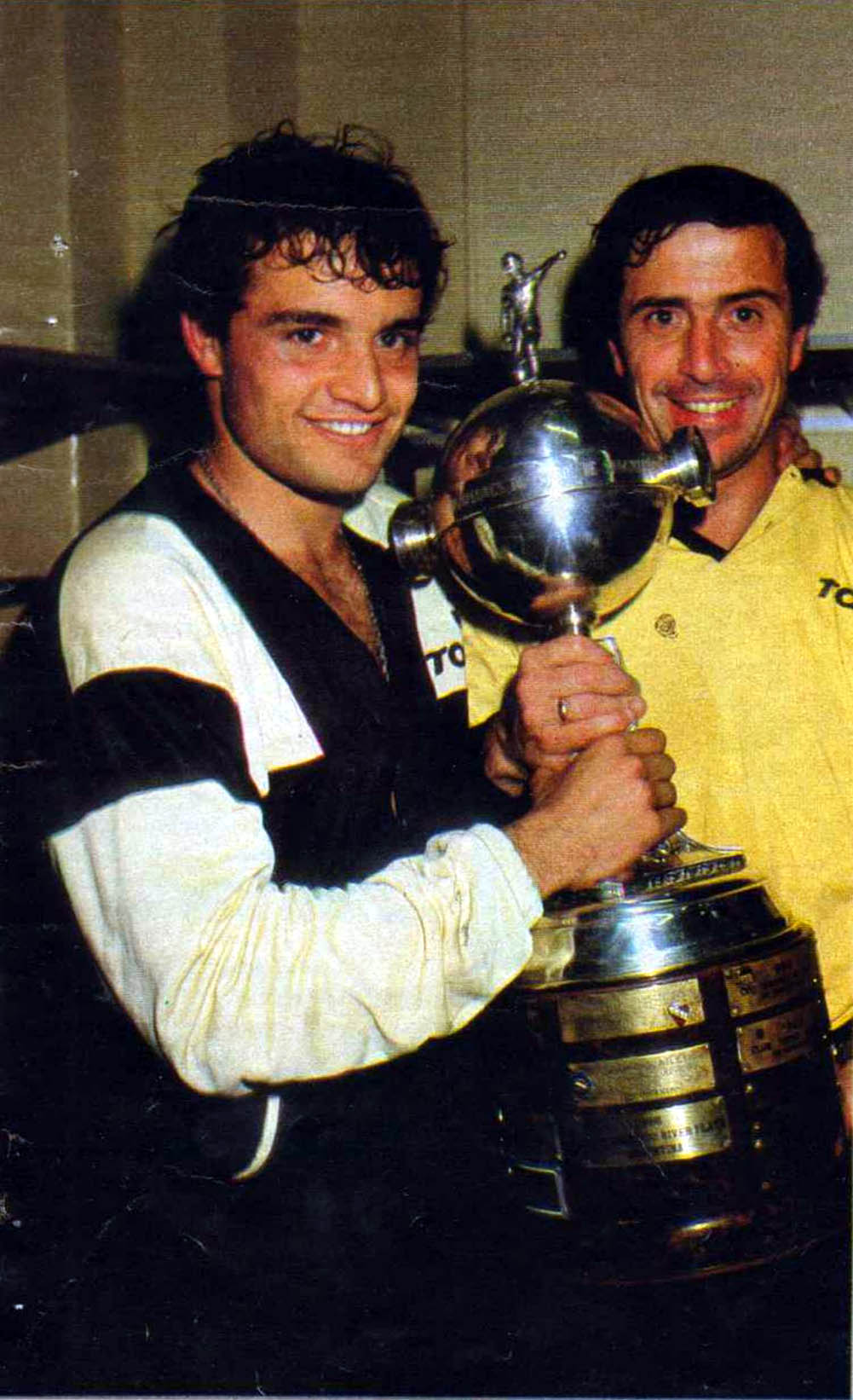
Three moments of the final: (left): Jorge Goncalvez in action; (center): Diego Aguirre celebrating his goal with Marcelo Rotti (17); (right): Aguirre and manager Tabárez with the Cup
31 October 1987
Playoff

Peñarol (Uruguay)	1–0 (a.e.t.)	(Colombia) América de Cali
Aguirre 120'	Report

Estadio Nacional, Santiago
Attendance: 25,000
Referee: Hernán Silva (Chile)

**Peñarol**	**América (C)**

GK	1	(Uruguay) Eduardo Pereira (c)
DF	4	(Uruguay) José Herrera	(red card) 74'
DF	17	(Uruguay) Marcelo Rotti
DF	3	(Uruguay) Obdulio Trasante
DF	6	(Uruguay) Alfonso Domínguez
MF	10	(Uruguay) Eduardo da Silva
MF	5	(Uruguay) José Perdomo		(substituted off) 46'
MF	15	(Uruguay) Ricardo Viera
FW	7	(Uruguay) Daniel Vidal		(substituted off) 72'
FW	9	(Uruguay) Diego Aguirre
FW	16	(Uruguay) Jorge Cabrera
Substitutes:
DF	2	(Uruguay) Jorge Gonçálvez		(substituted on) 46'
FW	18	(Uruguay) Jorge Villar		(substituted on) 72'
Manager:
(Uruguay) Oscar Tabárez

GK	1	(Argentina) Julio Falcioni
DF	2	(Colombia) Hugo Valencia
DF	3	(Colombia) Víctor Espinosa (c)
DF	13	(Colombia) Álvaro Aponte
DF	22	(Colombia) Jairo Ampudia	(red card) 120'
MF	9	(Colombia) Willington Ortiz
MF	5	(Colombia) Víctor Luna
MF	17	(Uruguay) Sergio Santín
MF	7	(Paraguay) Juan M. Battaglia
FW	15	(Argentina) Ricardo Gareca		(substituted off) 80'
FW	10	(Paraguay) Roberto Cabañas	(red card) 74'
Substitutes:
MF	20	(Colombia) Enrique Esterilla	(substituted on) 80'
Manager:
(Colombia) Gabriel Ochoa Uribe
