= 1987 Copa América final =

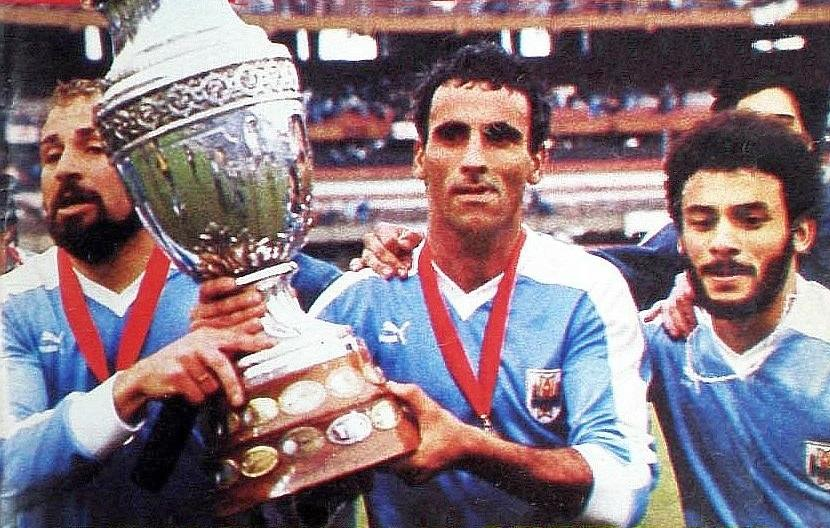
- Uruguay, champions
- Event: 1987 Copa América
Uruguay	Chile
(Uruguay)	(Chile)
1	0
- Date: July 12, 1987
- Venue: Monumental, Buenos Aires
- Referee: Romualdo Arppi Filho (Brazil)
- Attendance: 35,000

The 1987 Copa América final was the final match to decide the champion of the 1987 Copa América, the 33rd. edition of this continental competition. It was held on July 12, 1987, in Estadio Monumental in Buenos Aires. Uruguay beat Chile 1–0, achieving their 13th Copa América title.

== Qualified teams ==
Team	Previous final app.
Uruguay	1919, **1983**
Chile	1979

Bold indicates winning years

== Route to the final ==
Uruguay
Round
Chile
Opponent
Result
Group stage
Opponent
Result
(No match played)
Match 1
Venezuela
3–1

(No match played)
Match 2
Brazil
4–0

As current champions, Uruguay started to compete directly in semifinals

Final standings

Team	Pld	W	D	L	GF	GA	GD	Pts
Chile	2	2	0	0	7	1	+6	**4**
Brazil	2	1	0	1	5	4	+1	**2**
Venezuela	2	0	0	2	1	8	−7	**0**

Opponent
Result
Knockout stage
Opponent
Result
Argentina
1–0
Semi-finals
Colombia
2–1 (a.e.t.)

== Background ==
Uruguay had eliminated Argentina (reigning World Champion by then) based in their good defense and tactical order. As former defender and Olympic champion José Nasazzi stated, "We make the first 10 fouls of the match and then we win playing fair", that phrase synthesized the Uruguayan rough style of play to prevail psychologically over the rival since the first minute of the match.

Under that premise, defensive players Obdulio Trasante and José Perdomo applied that rough tactics during the first minutes, carrying the Argentine side to that style of play, confusing their rival. Once the first objective was fulfilled, Uruguay started to play fair, keeping the possession of the ball until the match ended.

== The match ==
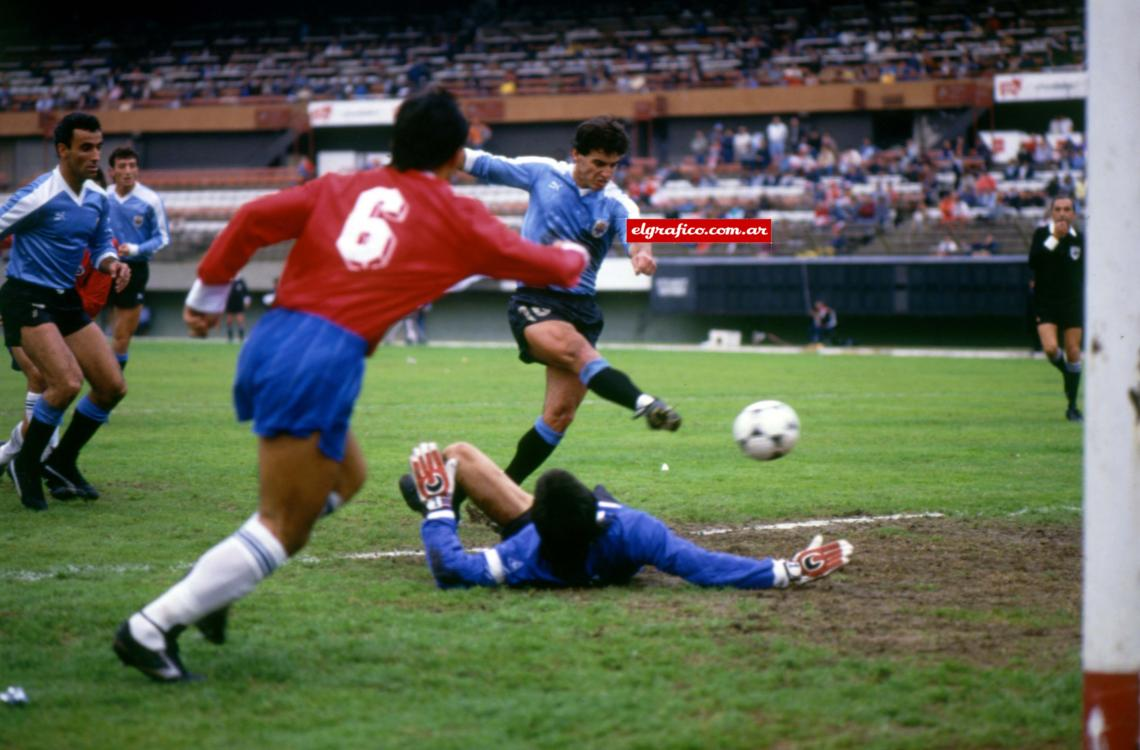
Pablo Bengoechea scoring the only goal for Uruguay

In the decisive match played at Estadio Monumental of Buenos Aires, Chile played dirty, committing a great amount of fouls, with Enzo Francescoli as one of their main victims. Because of that rough style of playing, defender Eduardo Gómez was sent off by Brazilian referee Romualdo Arpi Filho with before the 15 minutes of the match.

Nevertheless, Francascoli would be also sent off after fouling rival Fernando Astengo. Uruguay won the final through the highlighted performances of Alfonso Domínguez (who controlled the movements of Ivo Basay, Chile's most notable forward), and central midfielder José Perdomo, who played both, defensive and offensive positions.

=== Match details ===
1987 Copa América Final
July 12, 1987

Uruguay	1–0	Chile
Bengoechea 56'

Estadio Monumental, Buenos Aires
Attendance: 35,000
Referee: Arppi Filho (Brazil)

**Uruguay**	**Chile**

GK	12	Eduardo Pereira
RB	14	Alfonso Domínguez
CB	3	Nelson Gutiérrez
CB	4	Obdulio Trasante
LB	5	José Pintos Saldanha
RM	8	Gustavo Matosas
CM	15	José Perdomo (c)	(red card) 90'
CM	16	Pablo Bengoechea
LM	10	Enzo Francescoli	(red card) 27'
CF	7	Antonio Alzamendi		(substituted off) 86'
CF	11	Rubén Sosa
Substitutions:
DF	6	José Enrique Peña		(substituted on) 86'
Manager:
(Uruguay) Roberto Fleitas

GK	1	Roberto Rojas (c)
RB	2	Óscar Reyes
CB	8	Eduardo Gómez	(yellow card) 9' (yellow-red card) 14'
CB	11	Fernando Astengo	(yellow card) 17' (red card) 90'
LB	4	Luis Hormazábal
RM	18	Patricio Mardones
CM	10	Jorge Contreras
CM	20	Héctor Puebla		(substituted off) 19'
LM	6	Jaime Pizarro
CF	9	Juan Carlos Letelier
CF	7	Ivo Basay
Substitutions:
DF	3	Ricardo Toro		(substituted on) 19'	(substituted off) 63'
MF	21	Hugo Rubio		(substituted on) 63'
Manager:
(Chile) Orlando Aravena
