= South American Footballer of the Year =

Annual football award

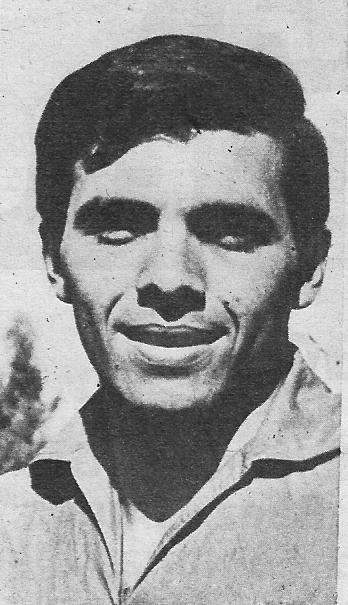
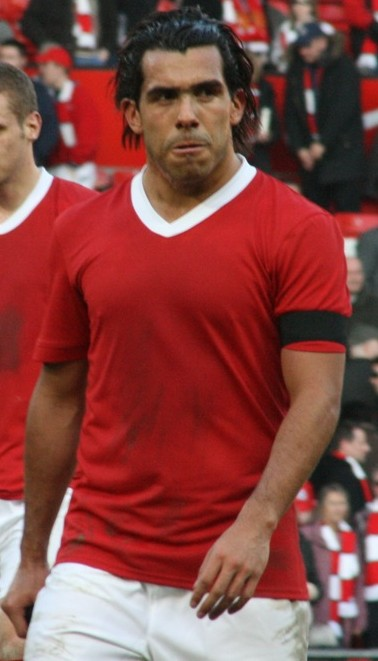
Elías Figueroa and Carlos Tevez were each named the South American Footballer of the Year three times in succession, three decades apart.

The Rey de América ("King of America"), often referred to as the South American Footballer of the Year, is an annual association football award presented to the best footballer in South America over the previous calendar year. The award was conceived by Venezuelan newspaper El Mundo, which awarded it from 1971 to 1992. Uruguayan newspaper El País took over from 1986 onwards, and their award was considered official, but El Mundo continued their award until 1992.

Originally for the El Mundo award, journalists could vote for any South American and Central American players at any club around the world. From 1986 the El País award became official and only South American players playing in South America were eligible. From 1998, eligibility extended to South Americans playing in Mexico due to the participation of Mexican clubs in the Copa Libertadores.

From 1980 to 1983 the Argentinian newspaper El Gráfico also chose their El Futbolista De América ("Footballer of the Americas"). Any South American player playing the Americas at any point in the year was eligible.

The inaugural winner was Tostão of Cruzeiro. Three players have won the award three times each: Elías Figueroa of Internacional, Zico of Flamengo, and Carlos Tevez of Boca Juniors and Corinthians; Figueroa and Tevez did so in consecutive years. As of 2025, Brazilian players have won the most awards (18), with Argentinian players a close second with 16 wins. Argentine club River Plate have had the most winners with nine awards. The most recent recipient of the award is Giorgian de Arrascaeta, playing for Flamengo in 2025.

== Winners ==
=== El Mundo award (1971–1985) ===
The award was officially awarded by newspaper El Mundo to the best South American footballer between 1971 and 1985. El Mundo continued their award until 1992, but it may not considered official. It was open to any South American player, no matter where they play.

Year	Rank	Player	Club	Points
1971	1st	(Brazil) Tostão	(Brazil) Cruzeiro	24
1971	2nd	(Argentina) José Pastoriza	(Argentina) Independiente	21
1971	3rd	(Argentina) Luis Artime	(Uruguay) Nacional	19
1972	1st	(Peru) Teófilo Cubillas	(Peru) Alianza Lima	41
1972	2nd	(Brazil) Pelé	(Brazil) Santos	32
1972	3rd	(Brazil) Jairzinho	(Brazil) Botafogo	28
1973	1st	(Brazil) Pelé	(Brazil) Santos	54
1973	2nd	(Argentina) Miguel Ángel Brindisi	(Argentina) Huracán	43
1973	3rd	(Brazil) Rivellino	(Brazil) Corinthians	33
1974	1st	(Chile) Elías Figueroa	(Brazil) Internacional	39
1974	2nd	(Brazil) Marinho Chagas	(Brazil) Botafogo	26
1974	3rd	(Argentina) Carlos Babington	(Germany) SG Wattenscheid 09	22
1975	1st	(Chile) Elías Figueroa	(Brazil) Internacional	50
1975	2nd	(Argentina) Norberto Alonso	(Argentina) River Plate	24
1975	3rd	(Uruguay) Fernando Morena	(Uruguay) Peñarol	23
1976	1st	(Chile) Elías Figueroa	(Brazil) Internacional	–
1976	2nd	(Brazil) Zico	(Brazil) Flamengo	–
1976	3rd	(Brazil) Rivellino	(Brazil) Fluminense	–
1977	1st	(Brazil) Zico	(Brazil) Flamengo	–
1977	2nd	(Brazil) Rivellino	(Brazil) Fluminense	–
1977	3rd	(Chile) Elías Figueroa	(Chile) Palestino	–
1978	1st	(Argentina) Mario Kempes	(Spain) Valencia	78
1978	2nd	(Argentina) Ubaldo Fillol	(Argentina) River Plate	59
1978	3rd	(Brazil) Dirceu	(Mexico) América	48
1979	1st	(Argentina) Diego Maradona	(Argentina) Argentinos Juniors	80
1979	2nd	(Paraguay) Romerito	(Paraguay) Sportivo Luqueño	40
1979	3rd	(Brazil) Falcão	(Brazil) Internacional	29
1980	1st	(Argentina) Diego Maradona	(Argentina) Argentinos Juniors	89
1980	2nd	(Brazil) Zico	(Brazil) Flamengo	37
1980	3rd	(Uruguay) Waldemar Victorino	(Uruguay) Nacional	22
1981	1st	(Brazil) Zico	(Brazil) Flamengo	–
1981	2nd	(Argentina) Diego Maradona	(Argentina) Boca Juniors	–
1981	3rd	(Brazil) Júnior	(Brazil) Flamengo	–
1982	1st	(Brazil) Zico	(Brazil) Flamengo	78
1982	2nd	(Brazil) Falcão	(Italy) Roma	46
1982	3rd	(Argentina) Diego Maradona	(Spain) Barcelona	31
1983	1st	(Brazil) Sócrates	(Brazil) Corinthians	59
1983	2nd	(Argentina) Ubaldo Fillol	(Argentina) Argentinos Juniors	30
1983	3rd	(Brazil) Éder	(Brazil) Atlético Mineiro	29
1984	1st	(Uruguay) Enzo Francescoli	(Argentina) River Plate	–
1984	2nd	(Argentina) Ubaldo Fillol	(Brazil) Flamengo	–
1984	3rd	(Argentina) Ricardo Bochini	(Argentina) Independiente	–
1985	1st	(Paraguay) Romerito	(Brazil) Fluminense	–
1985	2nd	(Uruguay) Enzo Francescoli	(Argentina) River Plate	–
1985	3rd	(Argentina) Claudio Borghi	(Argentina) Argentinos Juniors	–

=== Unofficial El Mundo award (1986–1992) ===
Year	Rank	Player	Club	Points
1986	1st	(Argentina) Diego Maradona	(Italy) Napoli	–
1986	2nd	(Brazil) Careca	(Brazil) São Paulo	–
1986	3rd	(Mexico) Hugo Sánchez	(Spain) Real Madrid	–
1987	1st	(Colombia) Carlos Valderrama	(Colombia) Deportivo Cali	–
1987	2nd	(Paraguay) Roberto Cabañas	(Colombia) América Cali	–
1987	3rd	(Uruguay) Antonio Alzamendi	(Argentina) River Plate	–
1988	1st	(Uruguay) Rubén Paz	(Argentina) Racing Club	–
1988	2nd	(Uruguay) Hugo de León	(Uruguay) Nacional	–
1988	3rd	(Brazil) Geovani Silva	(Brazil) Vasco da Gama	–
1988	3rd	(Brazil) Cláudio Taffarel	(Brazil) Internacional	–
1989	1st	(Argentina) Diego Maradona	(Italy) Napoli	–
1989	2nd	(Uruguay) Ruben Sosa	(Italy) Lazio	–
1989	3rd	(Brazil) Bebeto	(Brazil) Vasco da Gama	–
1990	1st	(Argentina) Diego Maradona	(Italy) Napoli	–
1990	2nd	(Argentina) Claudio Caniggia	(Italy) Atalanta	–
1990	3rd	(Colombia) René Higuita	(Colombia) Atlético Nacional	–
1991	1st	(Argentina) Gabriel Batistuta	(Italy) Fiorentina	–
1991	2nd	(Argentina) Claudio Caniggia	(Italy) Atalanta	–
1991	3rd	(Chile) Iván Zamorano	(Spain) Sevilla	–
1992	1st	(Argentina) Diego Maradona	(Spain) Sevilla	32
1992	2nd	(Brazil) Bebeto	(Spain) Deportivo La Coruña	31
1992	3rd	(Brazil) Raí	(Brazil) São Paulo	25

=== El Gráfico award (1980–1983) ===
From 1980 to 1983 El Gráfico gave out their Footballer of the Americas award.

Year	Rank	Player	Club	Points
1980	1st	(Argentina) Diego Maradona	(Argentina) Argentinos Juniors	485
1980	2nd	(Brazil) Zico	(Brazil) Flamengo	292
1980	3rd	(Argentina) Ubaldo Fillol	(Argentina) Argentinos Juniors	120
1981	1st	(Argentina) Diego Maradona	(Argentina) Boca Juniors	572
1981	2nd	(Brazil) Zico	(Brazil) Flamengo	524
1981	3rd	(Peru) Julio César Uribe	(Peru) Sporting Cristal	131
1982	1st	(Brazil) Zico	(Brazil) Flamengo	381
1982	2nd	(Argentina) Diego Maradona	(Spain) Barcelona	296
1982	3rd	(Uruguay) Fernando Morena	(Uruguay) Peñarol	214
1983	1st	(Brazil) Sócrates	(Brazil) Corinthians	286
1983	2nd	(Argentina) Ubaldo Fillol	(Argentina) Argentinos Juniors	251
1983	3rd	(Uruguay) Rodolfo Rodríguez	(Uruguay) Nacional	144

=== El País award (1986–present) ===
From 1986, the South American Footballer of the Year was named by El País. Only South American players of South American clubs are eligible.

Year	Rank	Player	Club	Points
1986	1st	(Uruguay) Antonio Alzamendi	(Argentina) River Plate	–
1986	2nd	(Brazil) Careca	(Brazil) São Paulo	–
1986	3rd	(Paraguay) Romerito	(Brazil) Fluminense	–
1987	1st	(Colombia) Carlos Valderrama	(Colombia) Deportivo Cali	56
1987	2nd	(Uruguay) Obdulio Trasante	(Uruguay) Peñarol	27
1987	3rd	(Uruguay) José Perdomo	(Uruguay) Peñarol	25
1988	1st	(Uruguay) Rubén Paz	(Argentina) Racing Club	–
1988	2nd	(Uruguay) Hugo de León	(Uruguay) Nacional	–
1988	3rd	(Uruguay) José Pintos Saldanha	(Uruguay) Nacional	–
1989	1st	(Brazil) Bebeto	(Brazil) Vasco da Gama	74
1989	2nd	(Brazil) Mazinho	(Brazil) Vasco da Gama	42
1989	3rd	(Colombia) René Higuita	(Colombia) Atlético Nacional	34
1990	1st	(Paraguay) Raúl Vicente Amarilla	(Paraguay) Olimpia	57
1990	2nd	(Uruguay) Rubén da Silva	(Argentina) River Plate	32
1990	3rd	(Colombia) Leonel Álvarez	(Colombia) Atlético Nacional	25
1990	3rd	(Colombia) René Higuita	(Colombia) Atlético Nacional	25
1991	1st	(Argentina) Oscar Ruggeri	(Argentina) Vélez Sarsfield	44
1991	2nd	(Argentina) Ramón Díaz	(Argentina) River Plate	28
1991	3rd	(Chile) Patricio Toledo	(Chile) Universidad Católica	23
1992	1st	(Brazil) Raí	(Brazil) São Paulo	55
1992	2nd	(Argentina) Sergio Goycochea	(Paraguay) Olimpia	24
1992	3rd	(Argentina) Alberto Acosta	(Argentina) San Lorenzo	20
1992	3rd	(Argentina) Fernando Gamboa	(Argentina) Newell's Old Boys	20
1993	1st	(Colombia) Carlos Valderrama	(Colombia) Junior	46
1993	2nd	(Bolivia) Marco Etcheverry	(Chile) Colo-Colo	30
1993	3rd	(Brazil) Cafu	(Brazil) São Paulo	28
1993	3rd	(Colombia) Freddy Rincón	(Brazil) Palmeiras	28
1994	1st	(Brazil) Cafu	(Brazil) São Paulo	36
1994	2nd	(Paraguay) José Luis Chilavert	(Argentina) Vélez Sarsfield	35
1994	3rd	(Argentina) Gustavo Adrián López	(Argentina) Independiente	22
1995	1st	(Uruguay) Enzo Francescoli	(Argentina) River Plate	34
1995	2nd	(Argentina) Diego Maradona	(Argentina) Boca Juniors	28
1995	3rd	(Brazil) Edmundo	(Brazil) Flamengo	24
1996	1st	(Paraguay) José Luis Chilavert	(Argentina) Vélez Sarsfield	80
1996	2nd	(Uruguay) Enzo Francescoli	(Argentina) River Plate	69
1996	3rd	(Argentina) Ariel Ortega	(Argentina) River Plate	41
1996	3rd	(Colombia) Carlos Valderrama	(Colombia) Junior	41
1997	1st	(Chile) Marcelo Salas	(Argentina) River Plate	87
1997	2nd	(Peru) Nolberto Solano	(Peru) Sporting Cristal	39
1997	3rd	(Paraguay) José Luis Chilavert	(Argentina) Vélez Sarsfield	37
1998	1st	(Argentina) Martín Palermo	(Argentina) Boca Juniors	73
1998	2nd	(Paraguay) Carlos Gamarra	(Brazil) Corinthians	70
1998	3rd	(Paraguay) José Luis Chilavert	(Argentina) Vélez Sarsfield	63
1999	1st	(Argentina) Javier Saviola	(Argentina) River Plate	55
1999	2nd	(Paraguay) Francisco Arce	(Brazil) Palmeiras	45
1999	3rd	(Argentina) Juan Román Riquelme	(Argentina) Boca Juniors	42
2000	1st	(Brazil) Romário	(Brazil) Vasco da Gama	67
2000	2nd	(Argentina) Juan Román Riquelme	(Argentina) Boca Juniors	64
2000	3rd	(Colombia) Óscar Córdoba	(Argentina) Boca Juniors	53
2000	3rd	(Argentina) Martín Palermo	(Argentina) Boca Juniors	53
2001	1st	(Argentina) Juan Román Riquelme	(Argentina) Boca Juniors	88
2001	2nd	(Colombia) Óscar Córdoba	(Argentina) Boca Juniors	59
2001	3rd	(Brazil) Romário	(Brazil) Vasco da Gama	41
2002	1st	(Paraguay) José Cardozo	(Mexico) Toluca	39
2002	2nd	(Uruguay) Sergio Órteman	(Paraguay) Olimpia	32
2002	3rd	(Uruguay) Alejandro Lembo	(Uruguay) Nacional	30
2003	1st	(Argentina) Carlos Tevez	(Argentina) Boca Juniors	73
2003	2nd	(Paraguay) José Cardozo	(Mexico) Toluca	39
2003	3rd	(Brazil) Diego	(Brazil) Santos	33
2004	1st	(Argentina) Carlos Tevez	(Argentina) Boca Juniors	76
2004	2nd	(Argentina) Javier Mascherano	(Argentina) River Plate	56
2004	3rd	(Argentina) Lucho González	(Argentina) River Plate	37
2004	3rd	(Brazil) Robinho	(Brazil) Santos	37
2005	1st	(Argentina) Carlos Tevez	(Brazil) Corinthians	77
2005	2nd	(Uruguay) Diego Lugano	(Brazil) São Paulo	54
2005	3rd	(Brazil) Cicinho	(Brazil) São Paulo	37
2006	1st	(Chile) Matías Fernández	(Chile) Colo-Colo	62
2006	2nd	(Argentina) Rodrigo Palacio	(Argentina) Boca Juniors	53
2006	3rd	(Argentina) Fernando Gago	(Argentina) Boca Juniors	50
2007	1st	(Paraguay) Salvador Cabañas	(Mexico) América	67
2007	2nd	(Paraguay) Claudio Morel Rodríguez	(Argentina) Boca Juniors	61
2007	3rd	(Argentina) Hugo Ibarra	(Argentina) Boca Juniors	57
2008	1st	(Argentina) Juan Sebastián Verón	(Argentina) Estudiantes	66
2008	2nd	(Argentina) Juan Román Riquelme	(Argentina) Boca Juniors	63
2008	3rd	(Paraguay) Salvador Cabañas	(Mexico) América	47
2009	1st	(Argentina) Juan Sebastián Verón	(Argentina) Estudiantes	109
2009	2nd	(Ecuador) Édison Méndez	(Ecuador) LDU Quito	64
2009	2nd	(Chile) Humberto Suazo	(Mexico) Monterrey	64
2009	3rd	(Argentina) Leandro Desábato	(Argentina) Estudiantes	52
2010	1st	(Argentina) Andrés D'Alessandro	(Brazil) Internacional	61
2010	2nd	(Argentina) Juan Sebastián Verón	(Argentina) Estudiantes	51
2010	3rd	(Brazil) Neymar	(Brazil) Santos	47
2011	1st	(Brazil) Neymar	(Brazil) Santos	130
2011	2nd	(Chile) Eduardo Vargas	Universidad de Chile	70
2011	3rd	(Brazil) Paulo Henrique Ganso	(Brazil) Santos	33
2012	1st	(Brazil) Neymar	(Brazil) Santos	199
2012	2nd	(Peru) Paolo Guerrero	(Brazil) Corinthians	50
2012	3rd	(Brazil) Lucas Moura	(Brazil) São Paulo	21
2013	1st	(Brazil) Ronaldinho	(Brazil) Atlético Mineiro	156
2013	2nd	(Brazil) Neymar	(Brazil) Santos	81
2013	3rd	(Argentina) Maxi Rodríguez	(Argentina) Newell's Old Boys	79
2014	1st	(Colombia) Teófilo Gutiérrez	(Argentina) River Plate	102
2014	2nd	(Uruguay) Carlos Sánchez	(Argentina) River Plate	49
2014	3rd	(Argentina) Leonardo Pisculichi	(Argentina) River Plate	30
2015	1st	(Uruguay) Carlos Sánchez	(Argentina) River Plate	182
2015	2nd	(Argentina) Carlos Tevez	(Argentina) Boca Juniors	61
2015	3rd	(Ecuador) Miller Bolaños	(Ecuador) Emelec	23
2016	1st	(Colombia) Miguel Borja	(Colombia) Atlético Nacional	85
2016	2nd	(Brazil) Gabriel Jesus	(Brazil) Palmeiras	76
2016	3rd	(Venezuela) Alejandro Guerra	(Colombia) Atlético Nacional	50
2017	1st	(Brazil) Luan	(Brazil) Grêmio	182
2017	2nd	(Peru) Paolo Guerrero	(Brazil) Flamengo	65
2017	3rd	(Brazil) Arthur	(Brazil) Grêmio	46
2018	1st	(Argentina) Pity Martínez	(Argentina) River Plate	130
2018	2nd	(Colombia) Juan Fernando Quintero	(Argentina) River Plate	49
2018	3rd	(Argentina) Franco Armani	(Argentina) River Plate	40
2019	1st	(Brazil) Gabriel Barbosa	(Brazil) Flamengo	168
2019	2nd	(Brazil) Bruno Henrique	(Brazil) Flamengo	83
2019	3rd	(Uruguay) Giorgian de Arrascaeta	(Brazil) Flamengo	40
2020	1st	(Brazil) Marinho	(Brazil) Santos	80
2020	2nd	(Argentina) Ignacio Fernández	(Argentina) River Plate	59
2020	3rd	(Paraguay) Gustavo Gómez	(Brazil) Palmeiras	57
2021	1st	(Argentina) Julián Alvarez	(Argentina) River Plate	59
2021	2nd	(Brazil) Gabriel Barbosa	(Brazil) Flamengo	45
2021	3rd	(Paraguay) Gustavo Gómez	(Brazil) Palmeiras	30
2022	1st	(Brazil) Pedro	(Brazil) Flamengo	68
2022	2nd	(Uruguay) Giorgian de Arrascaeta	(Brazil) Flamengo	64
2022	3rd	(Argentina) Julián Alvarez	(Argentina) River Plate	34
2023	1st	(Argentina) Germán Cano	(Brazil) Fluminense	167
2023	2nd	(Uruguay) Luis Suárez	(Brazil) Grêmio	40
2023	3rd	(Uruguay) Nicolás de la Cruz	(Argentina) River Plate	8
2024	1st	(Brazil) Luiz Henrique	(Brazil) Botafogo	128
2024	2nd	(Venezuela) Jefferson Savarino	(Brazil) Botafogo	28
2024	3rd	(Colombia) Juan Fernando Quintero	(Argentina) Racing Club	17
2025	1st	(Uruguay) Giorgian de Arrascaeta	(Brazil) Flamengo	179
2025	2nd	(Argentina) Lionel Messi	(United States) Inter Miami CF	39
2025	3rd	(Argentina) Adrián Martínez	(Argentina) Racing Club	12

=== Wins by player ===
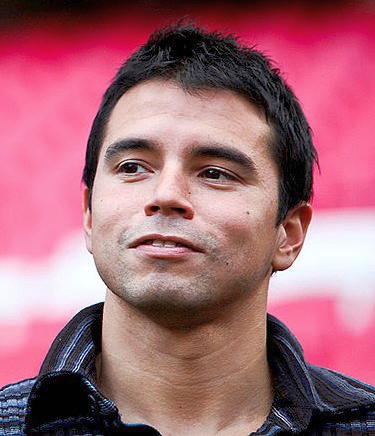
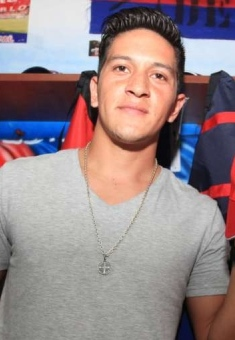
Javier Saviola and Germán Cano were the youngest and oldest winners at age 18 and age 35, respectively.

Player	1st	2nd	3rd
(Brazil) Zico	3 (1977, 1981, 1982)	2 (1976, 1980)	
(Argentina) Carlos Tevez	3 (2003, 2004, 2005)	1 (2015)	—
(Chile) Elías Figueroa	3 (1974, 1975, 1976)	—	1 (1977)
(Argentina) Diego Maradona	2 (1979, 1980)	2 (1981, 1995)	1 (1982)
(Uruguay) Enzo Francescoli	2 (1984, 1995)	2 (1985, 1996)	—
(Brazil) Neymar	2 (2011, 2012)	1 (2013)	1 (2010)
(Argentina) Juan Sebastián Verón	2 (2008, 2009)	1 (2010)	—
(Colombia) Carlos Valderrama	2 (1987, 1993)	—	1 (1996)
(Argentina) Juan Román Riquelme	1 (2001)	2 (2000, 2008)	1 (1999)
(Paraguay) José Luis Chilavert	1 (1996)	1 (1994)	2 (1997, 1998)
(Paraguay) Romerito	1 (1985)	1 (1979)	1 (1986)
(Uruguay) Giorgian de Arrascaeta	1 (2025)	1 (2022)	1 (2019)
(Brazil) Pelé	1 (1973)	1 (1972)	—
(Paraguay) José Cardozo	1 (2002)	1 (2003)	—
(Uruguay) Carlos Andrés Sánchez	1 (2015)	1 (2014)	—
(Brazil) Gabriel Barbosa	1 (2019)	1 (2021)	—
(Brazil) Cafu	1 (1994)	—	1 (1993)
(Argentina) Martín Palermo	1 (1998)	—	1 (2000)
(Brazil) Romário	1 (2000)	—	1 (2001)
(Paraguay) Salvador Cabañas	1 (2007)	—	1 (2008)
(Argentina) Julián Alvarez	1 (2021)	—	1 (2022)
(Brazil) Tostão	1 (1971)	—	—
(Peru) Teófilo Cubillas	1 (1972)	—	—
(Argentina) Mario Kempes	1 (1978)	—	—
(Brazil) Sócrates	1 (1983)	—	—
(Uruguay) Antonio Alzamendi	1 (1986)	—	—
(Uruguay) Rubén Paz	1 (1988)	—	—
(Brazil) Bebeto	1 (1989)	—	—
(Paraguay) Raúl Vicente Amarilla	1 (1990)	—	—
(Argentina) Oscar Ruggeri	1 (1991)	—	—
(Brazil) Raí	1 (1992)	—	—
(Chile) Marcelo Salas	1 (1997)	—	—
(Argentina) Javier Saviola	1 (1999)	—	—
(Chile) Matías Fernández	1 (2006)	—	—
(Argentina) Andrés D'Alessandro	1 (2010)	—	—
(Brazil) Ronaldinho	1 (2013)	—	—
(Colombia) Teófilo Gutiérrez	1 (2014)	—	—
(Colombia) Miguel Borja	1 (2016)	—	—
(Brazil) Luan	1 (2017)	—	—
(Argentina) Pity Martínez	1 (2018)	—	—
(Brazil) Marinho	1 (2020)	—	—
(Brazil) Pedro	1 (2022)	—	—
(Argentina) Germán Cano	1 (2023)	—	—
(Brazil) Luiz Henrique	1 (2024)	—	—

=== Wins by nationality ===
Country	Players	Total
Brazil	15	18
Argentina	12	16
Paraguay	5	5
Uruguay	5	5
Chile	3	5
Colombia	3	4
Peru	1	1

=== Wins by club ===
Club	Players	Total
(Argentina) River Plate	8	9
(Brazil) Flamengo	4	6
(Argentina) Boca Juniors	3	4
(Brazil) Santos	3	3
(Brazil) Internacional	2	4
(Brazil) São Paulo	2	2
(Brazil) Vasco da Gama	2	2
(Brazil) Corinthians	2	2
(Argentina) Vélez Sársfield	2	2
(Brazil) Fluminense	2	2
(Argentina) Argentinos Juniors	1	2
(Argentina) Estudiantes	1	2
(Peru) Alianza Lima	1	1
(Mexico) América	1	1
(Brazil) Atlético Mineiro	1	1
(Colombia) Atlético Nacional	1	1
(Brazil) Botafogo	1	1
(Chile) Colo-Colo	1	1
(Brazil) Cruzeiro	1	1
(Colombia) Deportivo Cali	1	1
(Brazil) Grêmio	1	1
(Colombia) Junior	1	1
(Paraguay) Olimpia	1	1
(Argentina) Racing Club	1	1
(Mexico) Toluca	1	1
(Spain) Valencia	1	1

== Women's award ==
=== El País award (2021–present) ===
From 2021, the South American Footballer of the Year was named by El País, with the accolade being named Reina de América.

Year	Rank	Player	Club	Points
2021	1st	(Brazil) Tamires	(Brazil) Corinthians	30
2021	2nd	(Colombia) Catalina Usme	(Colombia) América de Cali	29
2021	3rd	(Brazil) Gabi Zanotti	(Brazil) Corinthians	20
2022	1st	(Colombia) Linda Caicedo	(Colombia) Deportivo Cali	76
2022	2nd	(Brazil) Bia Zaneratto	(Brazil) Palmeiras	21
2022	3rd	(Argentina) Yamila Rodríguez	(Brazil) Palmeiras	20
2023	1st	(Brazil) Priscila	(Brazil) Internacional	34
2023	2nd	(Brazil) Millene	(Brazil) Corinthians	31
2023	3rd	(Brazil) Bia Zaneratto	(Brazil) Palmeiras	23
2024	1st	(Brazil) Gabi Zanotti	(Brazil) Corinthians	34
2024	2nd	(Brazil) Gabi Portilho	(Brazil) Corinthians	31
2024	3rd	(Brazil) Vic Albuquerque	(Brazil) Corinthians	23
2025	1st	(Brazil) Gabi Zanotti	(Brazil) Corinthians	71
2025	2nd	(Brazil) Marta	(United States) Orlando Pride	27
2025	3rd	(Paraguay) Claudia Martínez	(Paraguay) Olimpia	19

=== Wins by player ===
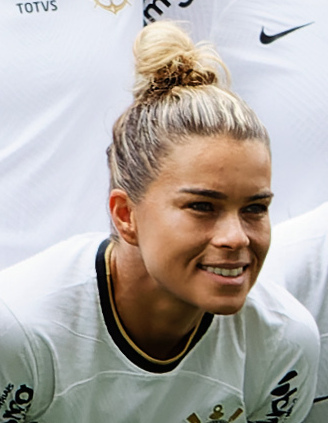
Tamires was the first winner of the accolade in women's football in 2021.

Player	1st	2nd	3rd
(Brazil) Gabi Zanotti	2 (2024, 2025)	—	1 (2021)
(Brazil) Tamires	1 (2021)	—	—
(Colombia) Linda Caicedo	1 (2022)	—	—
(Brazil) Priscila	1 (2023)	—	—

=== Wins by nationality ===
Country	Players	Total
Brazil	3	4
Colombia	1	1

=== Wins by club ===
Club	Players	Total
(Brazil) Corinthians	2	3
(Colombia) Deportivo Cali	1	1
(Brazil) Internacional	1	1

== South American Team of the Year ==
The Equipo Ideal de América ("Ideal XI of America") or South American Team of the Year is an annual football XI. It is chosen by the El País newspaper of Uruguay through votes from sports journalists across the continent.

Year	Goalkeeper	Defenders	Midfielders	Forwards
1986	(Argentina) Nery Pumpido	(Brazil) Josimar (Uruguay) Nelson Gutiérrez (Argentina) Oscar Ruggeri (Argentina) José Luis Cuciuffo	(Argentina) Héctor Enrique (Argentina) Sergio Batista (Paraguay) Romerito	(Uruguay) Antonio Alzamendi (Brazil) Careca (Paraguay) Roberto Cabañas
1987	(Uruguay) Eduardo Pereira	(Brazil) Josimar (Uruguay) Nelson Gutiérrez (Uruguay) Obdulio Trasante (Uruguay) Alfonso Domínguez	(Argentina) Ricardo Giusti (Uruguay) José Perdomo (Colombia) Carlos Valderrama	(Uruguay) Antonio Alzamendi (Uruguay) Diego Aguirre (Uruguay) Rubén Paz
1988	(Uruguay) Jorge Seré	(Uruguay) José Pintos (Chile) Fernando Astengo (Uruguay) Hugo de León (Uruguay) Alfonso Domínguez	(Brazil) Geovani Silva (Argentina) Sergio Batista (Uruguay) Rubén Paz	(Uruguay) Ernesto Vargas (Uruguay) Rubén da Silva (Colombia) Arnoldo Iguarán
1989	(Colombia) René Higuita	(Brazil) Mazinho (Argentina) Juan Simón (Uruguay) Hugo de León (Uruguay) Alfonso Domínguez	(Uruguay) Santiago Ostolaza (Argentina) Sergio Batista (Ecuador) Álex Aguinaga (Argentina) Ricardo Bochini	(Brazil) Bebeto (Argentina) Carlos Alfaro Moreno
1990	(Colombia) René Higuita	(Argentina) Fabián Basualdo (Argentina) Juan Simón (Uruguay) Daniel Revelez (Argentina) Carlos Enrique	(Colombia) Leonel Álvarez (Uruguay) Santiago Ostolaza (Paraguay) Luis Monzón	(Uruguay) Rubén da Silva (Paraguay) Raúl Amarilla (Paraguay) Adriano Samaniego
1991	(Chile) Patricio Toledo	(Chile) Gabriel Mendoza (Peru) José del Solar (Argentina) Oscar Ruggeri (Ecuador) Hólger Quiñónez	(Argentina) Leonardo Astrada (Argentina) Juan José Borrelli (Argentina) Diego Latorre	(Brazil) Mário Tilico (Panama) Julio Dely Valdés (Argentina) Ramón Díaz
1992	(Argentina) Sergio Goycochea	(Brazil) Cafu (Argentina) Fernando Gamboa (Argentina) Fernando Cáceres (Argentina) Julio Saldaña	(Brazil) Léo Júnior (Brazil) Marco Antônio Boiadeiro (Argentina) Alberto Márcico (Brazil) Raí	(Argentina) Alberto Acosta (Brazil) Renato Gaúcho
1993	(Argentina) Sergio Goycochea	(Brazil) Cafu (Colombia) Luis Carlos Perea (Uruguay) Fernando Kanapkis (Ecuador) Luis Capurro	(Colombia) Carlos Valderrama (Colombia) Leonel Álvarez (Argentina) Diego Maradona (Bolivia) Marco Etcheverry	(Colombia) Freddy Rincón (Brazil) Müller
1994	(Paraguay) José Luis Chilavert	(Brazil) Cafu (Argentina) Roberto Ayala (Brazil) Ricardo Rocha (Brazil) Branco	(Uruguay) Enzo Francescoli (Brazil) Zinho (Argentina) Ariel Ortega (Colombia) Albeiro Usuriaga	(Argentina) Sebastián Rambert (Argentina) Gustavo López
1995	(Paraguay) José Luis Chilavert	(Brazil) Cafu (Argentina) Roberto Trotta (Paraguay) Carlos Gamarra (Ecuador) Luis Capurro	(Colombia) Leonel Álvarez (Uruguay) Eber Moas (Uruguay) Enzo Francescoli (Argentina) Diego Maradona	(Brazil) Romário (Brazil) Edmundo
1996	(Paraguay) José Luis Chilavert	(Paraguay) Francisco Arce (Paraguay) Celso Ayala (Paraguay) Carlos Gamarra (Argentina) Juan Pablo Sorín	(Paraguay) Roberto Acuña (Brazil) Palhinha (Colombia) Carlos Valderrama (Uruguay) Enzo Francescoli	(Argentina) Ariel Ortega (Chile) Marcelo Salas
1997	(Paraguay) José Luis Chilavert	(Paraguay) Francisco Arce (Paraguay) Celso Ayala (Colombia) Jorge Bermúdez (Peru) Nolberto Solano	(Argentina) Leonardo Astrada (Brazil) Denílson (Argentina) Marcelo Gallardo (Uruguay) Enzo Francescoli	(Chile) Marcelo Salas (Brazil) Edmundo
1998	(Paraguay) José Luis Chilavert	(Paraguay) Francisco Arce (Paraguay) Carlos Gamarra (Colombia) Jorge Bermúdez (Brazil) Felipe	(Argentina) Diego Cagna (Colombia) Mauricio Serna (Argentina) Marcelo Gallardo (Brazil) Marcelinho Carioca	(Argentina) Martín Palermo (Mexico) Luis Hernández
1999	(Paraguay) José Luis Chilavert	(Paraguay) Francisco Arce (Colombia) Iván Córdoba (Argentina) Walter Samuel	(Brazil) Vampeta (Brazil) Alex (Argentina) Juan Román Riquelme (Argentina) Pablo Aimar (Colombia) Freddy Rincón	(Brazil) Ronaldinho (Argentina) Javier Saviola
2000	(Colombia) Óscar Córdoba	(Paraguay) Francisco Arce (Paraguay) Carlos Gamarra (Colombia) Jorge Bermúdez (Argentina) Juan Pablo Sorín	(Colombia) Mauricio Serna (Argentina) Juan Román Riquelme (Argentina) Pablo Aimar (Brazil) Juninho Paulista	(Brazil) Romário (Argentina) Martín Palermo
2001	(Colombia) Óscar Córdoba	(Paraguay) Francisco Arce (Colombia) Mario Yepes (Uruguay) Alejandro Lembo (Argentina) Juan Pablo Sorín	(Colombia) Mauricio Serna (Argentina) Juan Román Riquelme (Argentina) Ariel Ortega (Brazil) Juninho Paulista	(Brazil) Romário (Argentina) Andrés D'Alessandro
2002	(Argentina) Sebastián Saja	(Paraguay) Francisco Arce (Paraguay) Gabriel Milito (Uruguay) Alejandro Lembo	(Uruguay) Sergio Órteman (Brazil) Kaká (Colombia) Freddy Grisales (Argentina) Andrés D'Alessandro	(Argentina) Marcelo Delgado (Paraguay) José Saturnino Cardozo (Brazil) Robinho
2003	(Argentina) Roberto Abbondanzieri	(Brazil) Elano (Argentina) Rolando Schiavi (Argentina) Clemente Rodríguez	(Argentina) Sebastián Battaglia (Uruguay) Marcelo Sosa (Brazil) Diego (Brazil) Alex	(Argentina) Carlos Tevez (Paraguay) José Saturnino Cardozo (Brazil) Robinho
2004	(Colombia) Juan Carlos Henao	(Brazil) Cicinho (Uruguay) Diego Lugano (Argentina) Rolando Schiavi (Brazil) Léo	(Argentina) Javier Mascherano (Brazil) Elano (Argentina) Lucho González	(Argentina) Carlos Tevez (Paraguay) José Saturnino Cardozo (Brazil) Robinho
2005	(Brazil) Rogério Ceni	(Brazil) Cicinho (Uruguay) Diego Lugano (Paraguay) Carlos Gamarra (Brazil) Gustavo Nery	(Argentina) Javier Mascherano (Argentina) Fernando Gago (Argentina) Daniel Bilos	(Argentina) Carlos Tevez (Argentina) Rodrigo Palacio (Argentina) Sergio Agüero
2006	(Brazil) Rogério Ceni	(Argentina) Hugo Ibarra (Argentina) Cata Díaz (Brazil) Fabão	(Argentina) Fernando Gago (Argentina) Juan Sebastián Verón (Chile) Matías Fernández (Argentina) Rodrigo Palacio	(Argentina) Gonzalo Higuaín (Chile) Humberto Suazo (Brazil) Fernandão
2007	(Mexico) Guillermo Ochoa	(Argentina) Hugo Ibarra (Paraguay) Paulo da Silva (Paraguay) Claudio Morel	(Argentina) Fernando Belluschi (Argentina) Éver Banega (Chile) Jorge Valdivia (Chile) Carlos Villanueva (Argentina) Diego Valeri	(Paraguay) Salvador Cabañas (Colombia) Radamel Falcao
2008	(Ecuador) José Cevallos	(Argentina) Marcos Angeleri (Paraguay) Julio César Cáceres (Brazil) Thiago Silva (Paraguay) Claudio Morel	(Argentina) Andrés D'Alessandro (Argentina) Juan Sebastián Verón (Argentina) Juan Román Riquelme (Brazil) Alex	(Brazil) Nilmar (Paraguay) Salvador Cabañas

== See also ==
- South American Coach of the Year
- UEFA Men's Player of the Year Award
