= Enrique Peña =

Enrique Peña may refer to:

- Enrique Peña Nieto (born 1966), 57th President of Mexico
- Enrique Peña Sánchez (1880–1922), Cuban bandleader and cornettist
- Enrique Peña Zauner (born 2000), Venezuelan-German footballer
- Enrique Peña (athlete) (born 1942), Colombian racewalker
- Álvaro Enrique Peña (born 1989), Uruguayan footballer
- José Enrique Peña (born 1963), Uruguayan footballer
- José Enrique de la Peña (1807–1840), colonel in the Mexican Army
