= Jorge Goncalvez =

Jorge Goncalvez may refer to:

- Jorge Gonçálvez (footballer) (born 1967), former Uruguayan footballer
- Jorge Goncalvez (racing driver) (born 1991), Venezuelan racing driver
