= Álvaro Peña =

Álvaro Peña may refer to:

- Álvaro Peña (Bolivian footballer) (born 1965)
- Álvaro Peña (Uruguayan footballer) (born 1989)
- Álvaro Peña (Spanish footballer) (born 1991)
