= Eduardo da Silva (disambiguation) =

Eduardo Silva may refer to:

- Eduardo Alves da Silva (born 1983), Brazilian-born Croatian footballer
- Eduardo Adelino da Silva (born 1979), Brazilian footballer
- Eduardo da Silva (footballer, born 1966), Uruguayan former footballer
- Eduardo Francisco de Silva Neto (born 1980), Brazilian footballer
