= 2009 South American Footballer of the Year =

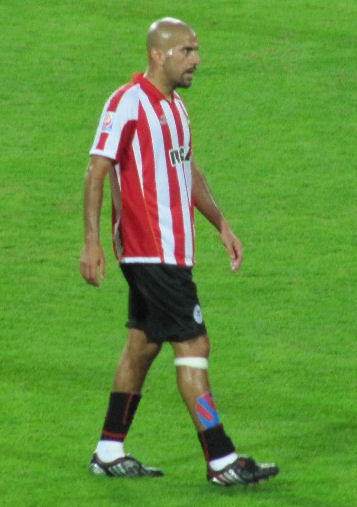
Juan Sebastián Verón is the South American Footballer of the Year for 2009.

The 2009 South American Footballer of the Year, given to the best football player in South America by Uruguayan newspaper El País through voting by journalists across the continent, was awarded to Juan Sebastián Verón of Estudiantes de La Plata on December 31, 2009.

Verón became the first player since Carlos Tevez in 2004 (and later in 2005) to repeat the award.

== Rankings ==
Rank	Player	Nationality	Club	Points
1	Juan Sebastián Verón	Argentina	(Argentina) Estudiantes	109
2	Édison Méndez	Ecuador	(Ecuador) LDU Quito	64
2	Humberto Suazo	Chile	(Mexico) Monterrey	64
4	Leandro Desábato	Argentina	(Argentina) Estudiantes	52
5	Claudio Bieler	Argentina	(Ecuador) LDU Quito	48
6	Salvador Cabañas	Paraguay	(Mexico) América	45
6	Nicolás Lodeiro	Uruguay	(Uruguay) Nacional	45
8	Nicolás Otamendi	Argentina	(Argentina) Vélez Sársfield	43
8	Miguel Pinto	Chile	Universidad de Chile	43
10	Néicer Reasco	Ecuador	(Ecuador) LDU Quito	42
11	Gary Medel	Chile	(Chile) Universidad Católica (Argentina) Boca Juniors	40
12	Mauro Boselli	Argentina	(Argentina) Estudiantes	35
12	Guillermo Ochoa	Mexico	(Mexico) América	35
14	Enrique Vera	Paraguay	(Mexico) América (Ecuador) LDU Quito	28
15	Darío Conca	Argentina	(Brazil) Fluminense	25
16	Aldo Bobadilla	Paraguay	(Colombia) Independiente Medellín	20
16	Santiago Silva	Uruguay	(Argentina) Vélez Sársfield	20
18	Claudio Morel Rodríguez	Paraguay	(Argentina) Boca Juniors	19
19	Rolando Schiavi	Argentina	(Argentina) Estudiantes (Argentina) Newell's Old Boys	18
20	Adriano	Brazil	(Brazil) Flamengo	17

== Notes ==
1. Édison Méndez played for Dutch club PSV during the first half of 2009.
