= 2022 South American Footballer of the Year =

Award given by Uruguayan newspaper

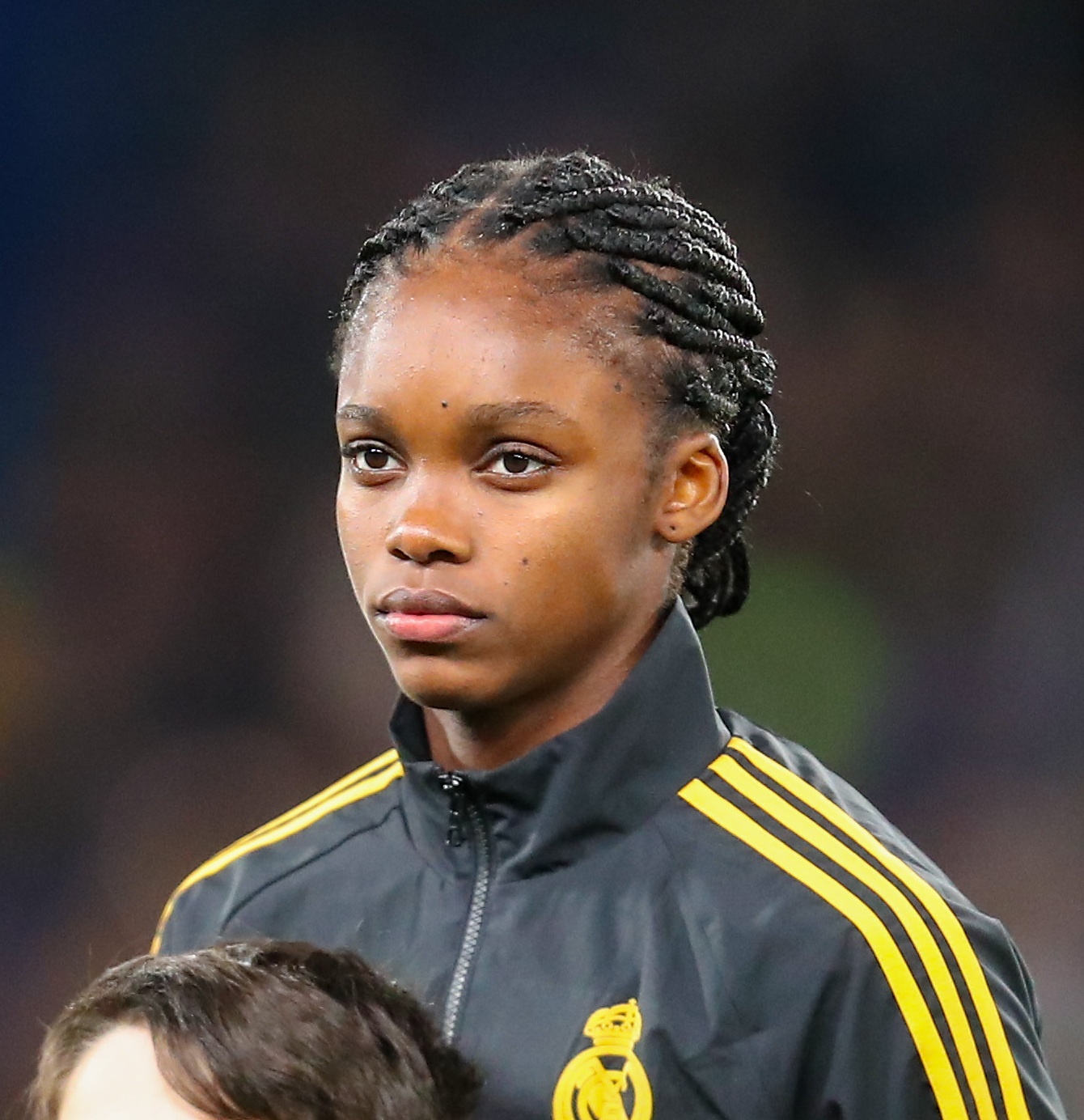
Linda Caicedo, 2022 South American Footballer of the Year

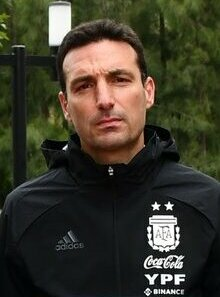
Lionel Scaloni, 2022 South American Coach of the Year

The 2022 South American Footballer of the Year award (Spanish: Rey del Fútbol de América), given to the best football player in South America by Uruguayan newspaper El País through voting by journalists across the continent, was awarded to Brazilian striker Pedro of Flamengo on March 15, 2023. Pedro finished only four votes ahead of Uruguayan midfielder and Flamengo teammate Giorgian de Arrascaeta.

The award is part of the paper's "El Mejor de América" (The Best of America) awards, which also presents the awards for South American Women's Player of the Year (Reina de América), South American Coach of the Year (Entrenador del año en Sudamérica) and the Best XI (Equipo Ideal), composed of the best eleven players at their positions. Lionel Scaloni was named Coach of the Year after leading Argentina to victory at the 2022 FIFA World Cup.

At eighteen years of age, Colombian forward Linda Caicedo was named Women's Football Player of the Year.

== Best Player ==
Rank	Player	Nationality	Club	Votes
1	Pedro	Brazil	(Brazil) Flamengo	68
2	Giorgian de Arrascaeta	Uruguay	(Brazil) Flamengo	64
3	Julián Alvarez	Argentina	(Argentina) River Plate (Note: Julián Alvarez played part of 2022 with Manchester City (England).)	34
4	Gabriel Barbosa	Brazil	(Brazil) Flamengo	13
5	Enzo Fernández	Argentina	(Argentina) River Plate	12
6	Luis Suárez	Uruguay	(Uruguay) Nacional (Note: Luis Suárez played part of 2022 with Atlético Madrid (Spain).)	3
6	Germán Cano	Argentina	(Brazil) Fluminense	3
6	Éverton Ribeiro	Brazil	(Brazil) Flamengo	3
9	Gustavo Gómez	Paraguay	(Brazil) Palmeiras	2
9	Raphael Veiga	Brazil	(Brazil) Palmeiras	2
9	Lautaro Díaz	Argentina	(Ecuador) Independiente del Valle (Note: Lautaro Díaz played part of 2022 with Villa Dálmine (Argentina).)	2
12	Dudu	Brazil	(Brazil) Palmeiras	1
12	Víctor Figueroa	Argentina	(Ecuador) Aucas	1
12	Franco Armani	Argentina	(Argentina) River Plate	1
12	Alex Roldán	El Salvador	(United States) Seattle Sounders FC	1
12	Camilo Vargas	Colombia	(Mexico) Atlas	1
12	Carlos Vela	Mexico	(United States) LAFC	1
12	Cristian Pellerano	Argentina (Note: Cristian Pellerano is a Mexican naturalized citizen.)	(Ecuador) Independiente del Valle	1
12	Gustavo Scarpa	Brazil	(Brazil) Palmeiras	1
12	Junior Sornoza	Ecuador	(Ecuador) Independiente del Valle	1
12	Pablo Lavandeira	Uruguay	(Peru) Alianza Lima	1
12	Jhon Durán	Colombia	(United States) Chicago Fire	1
12	Agustín Auzmendi	Argentina	(Honduras) Olancho (Note: Agustín Auzmendi played part of 2022 with Jaguares de Córdoba (Colombia).)	1

== Best Women's Player ==
Rank	Player	Nationality	Club	Votes
1	Linda Caicedo	Colombia	(Colombia) Deportivo Cali	76
2	Bia Zaneratto	Brazil	(Brazil) Palmeiras	21
3	Yamila Rodríguez	Argentina	(Argentina) Boca Juniors	20
4	Ary Borges	Brazil	(Brazil) Palmeiras	7
4	Duda Sampaio	Brazil	(Brazil) Internacional	7

== Best Manager ==
Rank	Player	Nationality	Club / National team	Votes
1	Lionel Scaloni	Argentina	Argentina national team	107
2	Abel Ferreira	Portugal	(Brazil) Palmeiras	35
3	Dorival Júnior	Brazil	(Brazil) Flamengo (Note: Dorival Júnior spent part of 2022 as manager of Ceará (Brazil).)	28
4	Martín Anselmi	Argentina	(Ecuador) Independiente del Valle (Note: Martín Anselmi spent part of 2022 as manager of Unión La Calera (Chile).)	20
5	Luiz Felipe Scolari	Brazil	(Brazil) Athletico Paranaense	8

== Best Team ==

2022 South American Best Team

Position	Player	Nationality	Club
GK	Weverton	Brazil	(Brazil) Palmeiras
LB	Thiago Heleno	Brazil	(Brazil) Athletico Paranaense
CB	David Luiz	Brazil	(Brazil) Flamengo
RB	Gustavo Gómez	Paraguay	(Brazil) Palmeiras
MF	Giorgian de Arrascaeta	Uruguay	(Brazil) Flamengo
MF	Lorenzo Faravelli	Argentina	(Ecuador) Independiente del Valle
MF	Gustavo Scarpa	Brazil	(Brazil) Palmeiras
MF	Éverton Ribeiro	Brazil	(Brazil) Flamengo
FW	Julián Alvarez	Argentina	(Argentina) River Plate (Note: Julián Alvarez played part of 2022 with Manchester City (England).)
FW	Pedro	Brazil	(Brazil) Flamengo
FW	Gabriel Barbosa	Brazil	(Brazil) Flamengo

== National league awards ==
Nation	Best player	Best manager	Best team
Argentina	(Argentina) Julián Alvarez (River Plate)	(Argentina) Fernando Gago (Racing Club)	Racing Club
Bolivia	(Brazil) Chico (Bolívar)	(Brazil) Antônio Carlos Zago (Bolívar)	Bolívar
Brazil	(Brazil) Gustavo Scarpa (Palmeiras)	(Portugal) Abel Ferreira (Palmeiras)	Palmeiras
Chile	(Argentina) Juan Martín Lucero (Colo-Colo)	(Argentina) Gustavo Quinteros (Note: Gustavo Quinteros has Bolivian dual-citizenship.) (Colo-Colo)	Colo-Colo
Colombia	(Colombia) Leonardo Castro (Deportivo Pereira)	(Colombia) Alejandro Restrepo (Deportivo Pereira)	Deportivo Pereira
Costa Rica	(Costa Rica) Celso Borges (Alajuelense)	(Costa Rica) Jeaustin Campos (Saprissa)	Cartaginés
Ecuador	(Haiti) Ricardo Adé (Aucas)	(Venezuela) César Farías (Aucas)	Aucas
United States	(Mexico) Carlos Vela (Los Angeles FC)	(United States) Steve Cherundolo (Los Angeles FC)	Los Angeles FC
Honduras	(Honduras) Michaell Chirinos (Olimpia)	(Argentina) Pedro Troglio (Olimpia)	Olimpia
Mexico	(Argentina) Nicolás Ibáñez (Pachuca)	(Uruguay) Guillermo Almada (Pachuca)	Pachuca
Paraguay	(Paraguay) Derlis González (Club Olimpia)	(Paraguay) Julio César Cáceres (Club Olimpia)	Club Olimpia
Peru	(Argentina) Hernán Barcos (Alianza Lima)	(Peru) Guillermo Salas (Alianza Lima)	Alianza Lima
Uruguay	(Uruguay) Felipe Carballo (Nacional)	(Uruguay) Pablo Repetto (Nacional)	Nacional
Venezuela	(Venezuela) Yerson Chacón (Deportivo Táchira)	(Venezuela) José María Morr (Metropolitanos)	Metropolitanos
