= Rubén Paz =

Uruguayan footballer (born 1959)

Ruben Paz
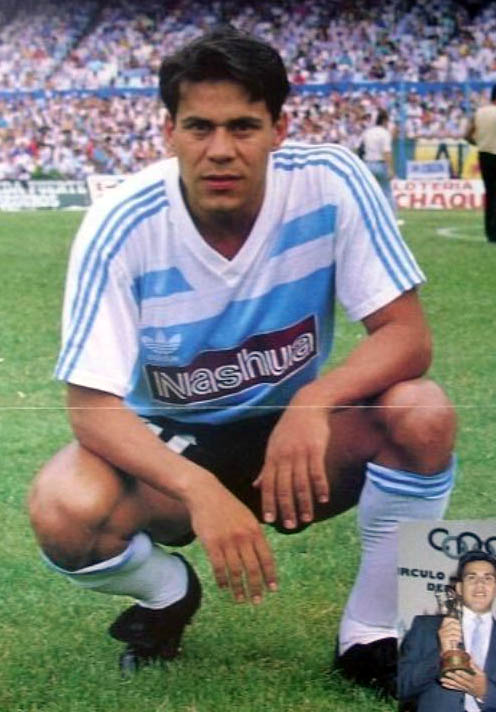
- Paz during his time at Racing Club in 1988

Personal information
- Full name: Ruben Wálter Paz Márquez
- Date of birth: 8 August 1959 (age 67)
- Place of birth: Artigas, Uruguay
- Height: 1.74 m (5 ft 9 in)
- Position: Midfielder

Youth career
- 1966–1975: Peñarol de Artigas

Senior career*
Years	Team	Apps	(Gls)
1975–1977	Peñarol de Artigas		
1977–1982	Peñarol	82	(39)
1982–1986	Internacional	44	(10)
1986–1987	Racing Paris	6	(0)
1987–1989	Racing Club	53	(17)
1989–1990	Genoa	25	(1)
1990–1993	Racing Club	75	(12)
1994	Rampla Juniors	10	(2)
1995	Frontera Rivera	6	(1)
1995–1996	Godoy Cruz	7	(0)
1996	Wanderers Artigas		
1997–2000	Frontera Rivera		
2002	Nacional San José de Mayo		
2003–2005	Tito Borjas		
2006	Pirata Juniors		

International career
1979–1990	Uruguay	45	(8)
Medal record
Representing Uruguay
World Champions’ Gold Cup
Winner	1980 Uruguay
Copa América
Runner-up	1989 Brazil
- * Club domestic league appearances and goals

Ruben Wálter Paz Márquez (born 8 August 1959) is a Uruguayan former professional footballer who played as a midfielder. Paz played at two FIFA World Cups for Uruguay and was also South American Footballer of the Year in 1988. He retired in 2006 at the age of 47. He is currently Peñarol's assistant coach.

== Club career ==
Ruben Paz began his career at the age of 17 when he joined the Club Atlético Peñarol Montevideo in 1977. He played in Peñarol until February 1982, where he obtained important achievements, winning three Uruguayan league championships (1978, 1979 and 1981) and became top scorer of the Uruguayan league by 1981.

In 1982, he emigrated to the Brazilian League, specifically the Rio Grande do Sul team Internacional, where he won three consecutive Gaúcho championships (1982, 1983, 1984) and was considered the best player of the Brazilian league by 1985–86.

In 1986, he made the leap to Europe, specifically to Matra Racing Paris (now the Racing Club de France) of the Ligue 1 of French Football, where he played alongside his compatriot Enzo Francescoli.

The following year he was transferred to Racing Club de Avellaneda in the Argentine league, where he became the team leader and an idol for the fans of the squad that conquered the South American Super Cup and Interamericana Super Cup in 1988. That same year he was crowned as both the Argentinian and South American Footballer of the Year. He was one of the few players in Argentinian football to be respected by all supporters.

During the 1989–90 season, he transferred to Genoa in the Serie A of the Italian Football League, coinciding with two compatriots, José Perdomo and Carlos Aguilera.

The following year( he returned to Racing Club. In 1993 he returned to Uruguay to play in Rampla Juniors, and the following year moved to the Frontera Rivera club, where he stayed until 2000, except for the 1996 season, when he played for Godoy Cruz of Mendoza, Argentina. Later he continued to play in smaller clubs, ending his playing career in 2006.

== International career ==
Participated in the Uruguayan team that won the Mundialito in 1980. Later he played in two editions of the FIFA World Cup, those held in Mexico in 1986 and Italy in 1990, In the latter tournament, his national team was eliminated in second round by hosts Italy.

== Career statistics ==
=== International ===
Appearances and goals by national team and year
National team	Year	Apps	Goals
Uruguay	1979	3	1
Uruguay	1980	10	4
Uruguay	1981	7	1
Uruguay	1982	0	0
Uruguay	1983	0	0
Uruguay	1984	0	0
Uruguay	1985	0	0
Uruguay	1986	3	1
Uruguay	1987	0	0
Uruguay	1988	2	0
Uruguay	1989	14	1
Uruguay	1990	6	0
Total		45	8

Scores and results list Uruguay's goal tally first, score column indicates score after each Paz goal.

List of international goals scored by Rubén Paz
No.	Date	Venue	Opponent	Score	Result	Competition
1	26 September 1979	Estadio Centenario, Montevideo, Uruguay	Paraguay	2–1	2–2	1979 Copa América
2	11 December 1980	Estadio Campus Municipal, Maldonado, Uruguay	Bolivia	4–0	5–0	Friendly
3	18 December 1980	Estadio Luis Tróccoli, Montevideo, Uruguay	Switzerland	2–0	4–0	Friendly
4	18 December 1980	Estadio Luis Tróccoli, Montevideo, Uruguay	Switzerland	3–0	4–0	Friendly
5	18 December 1980	Estadio Luis Tróccoli, Montevideo, Uruguay	Switzerland	4–0	4–0	Friendly
6	9 August 1981	Estadio Centenario, Montevideo, Uruguay	Colombia	1–0	3–2	1982 FIFA World Cup qualification
7	23 April 1986	Lansdowne Road, Dublin, Ireland	Republic of Ireland	1–0	1–1	Friendly
8	10 July 1989	Maracanã Stadium, Rio de Janeiro, Brazil	Paraguay	3–0	3–0	1989 Copa América

== Honours ==
Peñarol

- Primera División: 1978, 1979, 1981

Internacional

- Campeonato Gaúcho: 1982, 1983, 1984

Racing Club

- Supercopa Sudamericana: 1988
- Supercopa Interamericana: 1988

Uruguay

- Mundialito: 1980
- South American U-20 Championship: 1977, 1979
