= Agustín Peña =

Uruguayan footballer (born 1989)

Personal information
- Full name: Alejandro Agustín Peña Montero
- Date of birth: 8 May 1989 (age 37)
- Place of birth: Montevideo, Uruguay
- Height: 1.81 m (5 ft 11 in)
- Position: Right back

Team information
- Current team: Montevideo City
- Number: 19

Youth career
- –2008: Montevideo Wanderers

Senior career*
Years	Team	Apps	(Gls)
2008–2010	Montevideo Wanderers	39	(1)
2010–2011	Huracán	14	(0)
2012	El Tanque Sisley	3	(0)
2012–2013	Atlético Tucumán	15	(0)
2013–2014	Liverpool de Montevideo	26	(2)
2014	Boavista	0	(0)
2014–2018	Danubio	73	(2)
2019–	Montevideo City	15	(0)

International career
2009	Uruguay U-20	4	(1)
- * Club domestic league appearances and goals as of 02:37, 26 December 2020 (UTC)

Alejandro Agustín Peña Montero (born March 8, 1989) is a Uruguayan footballer currently playing for Torque in the Uruguayan Primera División.

== International career ==
Peña has played for the Uruguay under-20 team at the 2009 South American Youth Championship held in Venezuela where he scored a goal against Chile.

== Personal life ==
He is twin brother of Uruguayan footballer Álvaro Enrique Peña and the son of the former Uruguayan international footballer José Enrique Peña.
