= Guillermo Almada =

Uruguayan footballer and manager (born 1966)

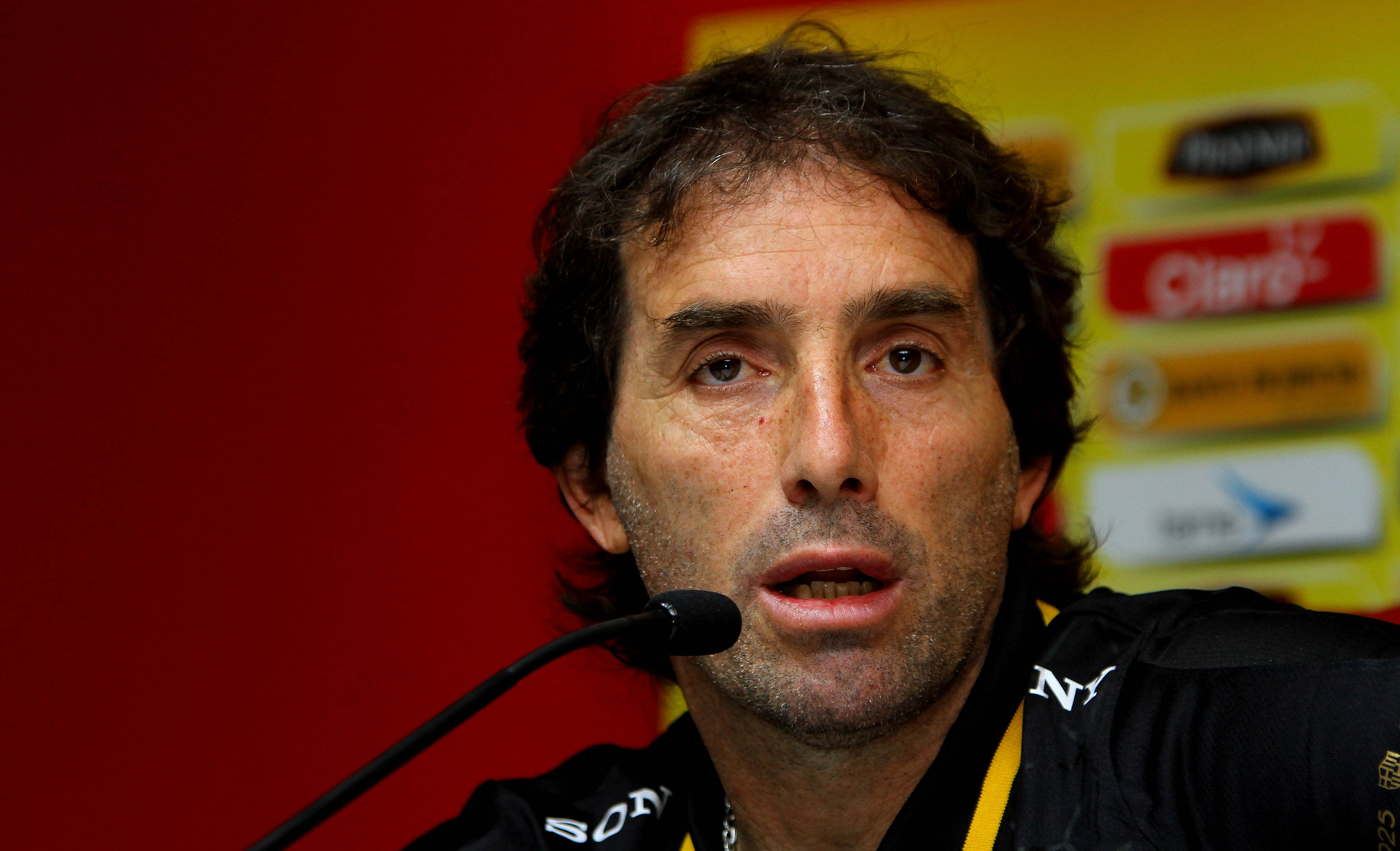
- Almada in 2015

Personal information
- Full name: Guillermo Jorge Almada Alves
- Date of birth: 18 June 1966 (age 60)
- Place of birth: Montevideo, Uruguay
- Position: Midfielder

Team information
- Current team: América (head coach)

Senior career*
Years	Team	Apps	(Gls)
1985–1988	Defensor Sporting		
1988–1989	O'Higgins		
1989–1995	Defensor Sporting		
1995–1996	Cerro		
1996	América de Cali		
1996–1998	Huracán Buceo		
1998–1999	Defensor Sporting		
1999	Aurora		
1999–2000	Progreso		
2000–2002	Tacuarembó		
2002–2003	River Plate Montevideo		
2003–2005	Montevideo Wanderers		
2005–2006	Tacuarembó		
2006	Fénix		
2006–2007	Racing Montevideo		

Managerial career
- 2008: Progreso
- 2009–2010: Tacuarembó
- 2011–2015: River Plate Montevideo
- 2015–2019: Barcelona SC
- 2019–2021: Santos Laguna
- 2022–2025: Pachuca
- 2025: Valladolid
- 2025–2026: Oviedo
- 2026–: América
- * Club domestic league appearances and goals

Guillermo Jorge Almada Alves (born 18 June 1969) is a Uruguayan professional football manager and former player who played as a midfielder. He is the current head coach of Liga MX club América.

== Playing career ==
As a player, Almada came through the youth ranks at Defensor Sporting, making his professional debut in 1985. He would go on to represent the club across three separate spells, winning two Primera División titles during that time. His playing career spanned 22 years, during which he played for twelve different clubs in four countries.

== Coaching career ==
=== Early years ===
Following his retirement as a player, Almada began his coaching career in Uruguay, where he managed Tacuarembó and River Plate de Montevideo.

In June 2015, Almada assumed the role of head coach at Barcelona SC in Ecuador. In December 2016, he successfully led the club to secure its 15th league title.

=== Mexico ===
In April 2019, Almada moved to Mexico to coach Santos Laguna. He guided the team to the final of the Guardianes 2021 tournament, where they ultimately finished in second place after a narrow defeat to Cruz Azul.

Almada became the head coach of Pachuca in December 2021. During his tenure, he developed a young, dynamic team with a distinct playing style that won the Apertura 2022 championship, followed by the CONCACAF Champions League.

In the inaugural edition of the FIFA Intercontinental Cup, Pachuca eliminated Botafogo, who were the reigning CONMEBOL champions at the time. They ended their campaign as runners-up, following a defeat to Real Madrid in the final match. In May 2025, Almada stepped down from his position.

=== Spain ===
On 8 July 2025, Segunda División club Real Valladolid announced Almada as their new head coach. He left the club on 15 December.

On 16 December 2025, a day after departing Valladolid, Almada was named as the new manager of La Liga side Real Oviedo, becoming their third manager of the campaign after Veljko Paunović and Luis Carrión. Almada left the club at the end of the season, following Oviedo's relegation.

=== Return to Mexico ===
On 7 June 2026, Almada returned to Mexico to become the new head coach of América.

== Managerial statistics ==
As of match played 21 November 2026

Managerial record by team and tenure
Team	Nat	From	To	Record							
Team	Nat	From	To	G	W	D	L	GF	GA	GD	Win %
Tacuarembó	(Uruguay)	30 April 2009	13 October 2010	37	11	6	20	47	65	−18	29.73
River Plate	(Uruguay)	5 April 2011	6 June 2015	135	70	30	35	235	156	+79	51.85
Barcelona SC	(Ecuador)	7 June 2015	13 April 2019	184	94	48	42	289	175	+114	51.09
Santos Laguna	(Mexico)	14 April 2019	29 November 2021	103	45	29	29	158	116	+42	43.69
Pachuca	(Mexico)	2 December 2021	29 May 2025	156	72	39	45	252	197	+55	46.15
Real Valladolid	(Spain)	8 July 2025	15 December 2025	19	6	6	7	20	17	+3	31.58
Oviedo	(Spain)	16 December 2025	23 May 2026	22	4	7	11	19	34	−15	18.18
América	(Mexico)	7 June 2026	Present	23	11	8	4	49	30	+19	47.83
Total				679	313	173	193	1,069	790	+279	46.10

== Honours ==
=== Player ===
Defensor Sporting

- Uruguayan Primera División: 1987, 1991

=== Manager ===
River Plate (Montevideo)

- Torneo Preparación: 2012

Barcelona de Guayaquil

- Ecuadorian Serie A: 2015–16

Pachuca

- Liga MX: Apertura 2022
- CONCACAF Champions Cup: 2024

Individual

- Liga MX Best Manager: 2022–23
- The Best of America Best Liga MX Manager: 2022
