= Romualdo Arppi Filho =

Brazilian football referee (1939–2023)

- Born: 7 January 1939; Santos, São Paulo, Brazil
- Died: 4 March 2023 (aged 84); Santos, São Paulo, Brazil
- Other occupation: Realtor

International
Years	League	Role
1963–1989	FIFA-listed	Referee

Romualdo Arppi Filho (7 January 1939 – 4 March 2023) was a Brazilian football referee. He officiated at three matches in the 1986 FIFA World Cup in Mexico, including the final between West Germany and Argentina at the Azteca Stadium, which was won 3–2 by Argentina. He was the second successive Brazilian to referee a World Cup final after Arnaldo Cézar Coelho in 1982. Along with his compatriot Coelho, he is one of only two referees to have officiated both Copa América and FIFA World Cup final matches.

Throughout his career, he also refereed the second leg of the 1973 Copa Libertadores finals, the 1984 Intercontinental Cup final, and the 1987 Copa América final.

== Major matches refereed ==
Date	Match	Tournament	Venue	Result	Ref
29 May 1973	Colo-Colo vs. Independiente	1973 Copa Libertadores finals (second leg)	Estadio Nacional de Chile, Santiago	0–0 (1–1 on aggregate and 2–2 on points; Independiente won 2–1 after a play-off)	
9 December 1984	Liverpool vs. Independiente	1984 Intercontinental Cup final	National Stadium, Tokyo	0–1	
29 June 1986	Argentina vs. West Germany	1986 FIFA World Cup final	Estadio Azteca, Mexico City	3–2	
12 July 1987	Uruguay vs. Chile	1987 Copa América final	Estadio Monumental, Buenos Aires	1–0	

== Honours ==
- IFFHS World's Best Referee: 1987

Sporting positions (Brazil) Romualdo Arppi Filho
Preceded by 1982 FIFA World Cup Final (Brazil); Arnaldo Cézar Coelho	1986 FIFA World Cup Final Referee	Succeeded by 1990 FIFA World Cup Final (Uruguay) / (Mexico); Edgardo Codesal Méndez
