= 2011 South American Footballer of the Year =

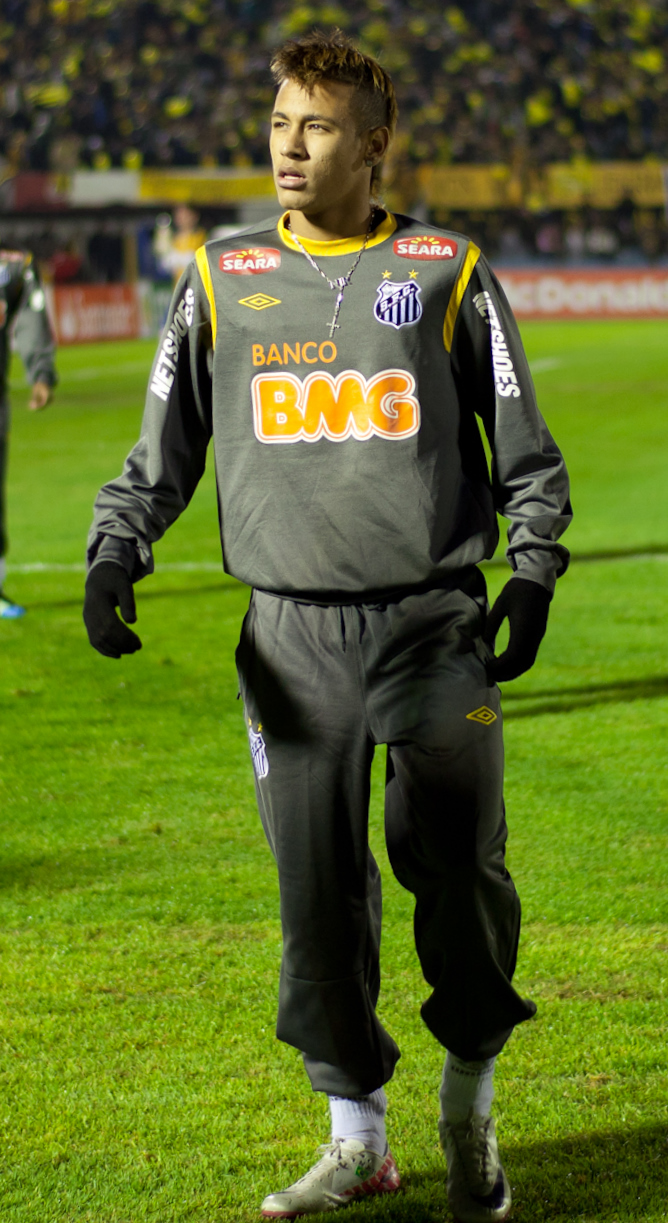
Neymar is the South American Footballer of the Year for 2011.

The 2011 South American Footballer of the Year, given to the best football player in South America by Uruguayan newspaper El País through voting by journalists across the continent, was awarded to Neymar of Santos on December 31, 2011.

Neymar became the second Santos player to win the award.

== Rankings ==
| Rank | Player | Nationality | Club | Points |
|---|---|---|---|---|
| 1 | Neymar | Brazil | (Brazil) Santos | 130 |
| 2 | Eduardo Vargas | Chile | Universidad de Chile | 70 |
| 3 | Paulo Henrique Ganso | Brazil | (Brazil) Santos | 33 |
| 4 | Egidio Arévalo Ríos | Uruguay | (Mexico) Club Tijuana | 30 |
| 5 | Rolando Schiavi | Argentina | (Argentina) Boca Juniors | 25 |
| 6 | Néicer Reasco | Ecuador | (Ecuador) LDU Quito | 24 |
| 6 | Clemente Rodríguez | Argentina | (Argentina) Boca Juniors | 24 |
| 8 | Jhonny Herrera | Chile | Universidad de Chile | 23 |
| 8 | Juan Román Riquelme | Argentina | (Argentina) Boca Juniors | 23 |
| 10 | Hernán Barcos | Argentina | (Ecuador) LDU Quito | 16 |
| 10 | Marcos González | Chile | Universidad de Chile | 16 |
| 12 | Emiliano Papa | Argentina | (Argentina) Vélez Sársfield | 15 |
| 12 | Dedé | Brazil | (Brazil) Vasco da Gama | 15 |
| 14 | Charles Aránguiz | Chile | Universidad de Chile | 14 |
| 14 | Elano | Brazil | (Brazil) Santos | 14 |
| 16 | Matías Rodríguez | Argentina | Universidad de Chile | 13 |
| 16 | Darío Verón | Paraguay | (Mexico) UNAM Pumas | 13 |
| 18 | Danilo | Brazil | (Brazil) Santos | 12 |
| 18 | Oswaldo Vizcarrondo | Venezuela | (Argentina) Olimpo | 12 |
| 18 | Ronaldinho | Brazil | (Brazil) Flamengo | 12 |
