= 2012 South American Footballer of the Year =

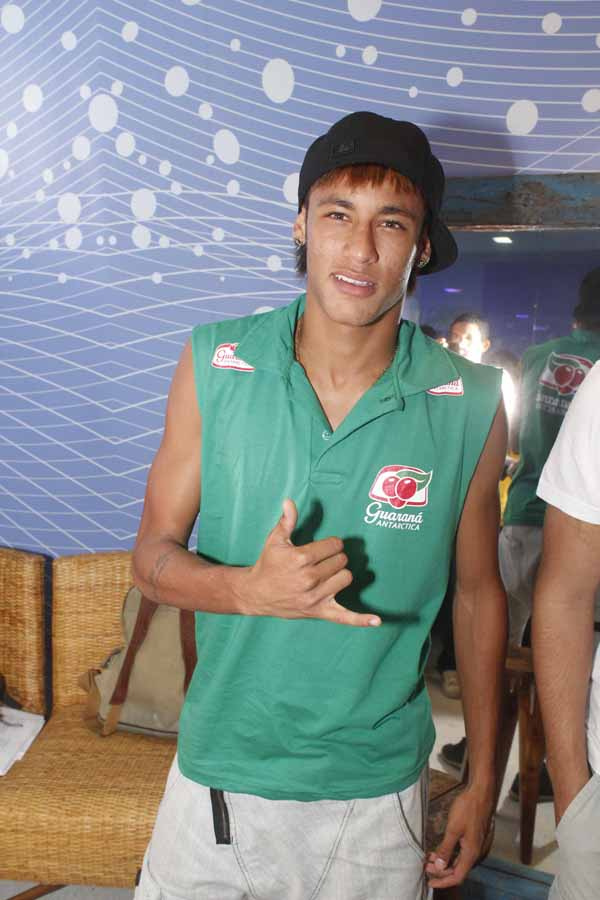
Neymar is the South American Footballer of the Year for 2012.

The 2012 South American Footballer of the Year, given to the best football player in South America by Uruguayan newspaper El País through voting by journalists across the continent, was awarded to Neymar of Santos on December 31, 2012.

Neymar became the first player since Juan Sebastián Verón in 2008 (and later in 2009) to repeat the award.

== Rankings ==
| Rank | Player | Nationality | Club | Points |
|---|---|---|---|---|
| 1 | Neymar | Brazil | (Brazil) Santos | 199 |
| 2 | Paolo Guerrero | Peru | (Brazil) Corinthians | 50 |
| 3 | Lucas | Brazil | (Brazil) São Paulo | 21 |
| 4 | Ronaldinho | Brazil | (Brazil) Atlético Mineiro | 12 |
| 5 | Fred | Brazil | (Brazil) Fluminense | 6 |
| 6 | Juan Román Riquelme | Argentina | (Argentina) Boca Juniors | 5 |
| 7 | Emerson | Qatar | (Brazil) Corinthians | 2 |
| 8 | Andrés D'Alessandro | Argentina | (Brazil) Internacional | 1 |
| 8 | Teófilo Gutiérrez | Colombia | (Colombia) Atlético Junior | 1 |
