= 2018 South American Footballer of the Year =

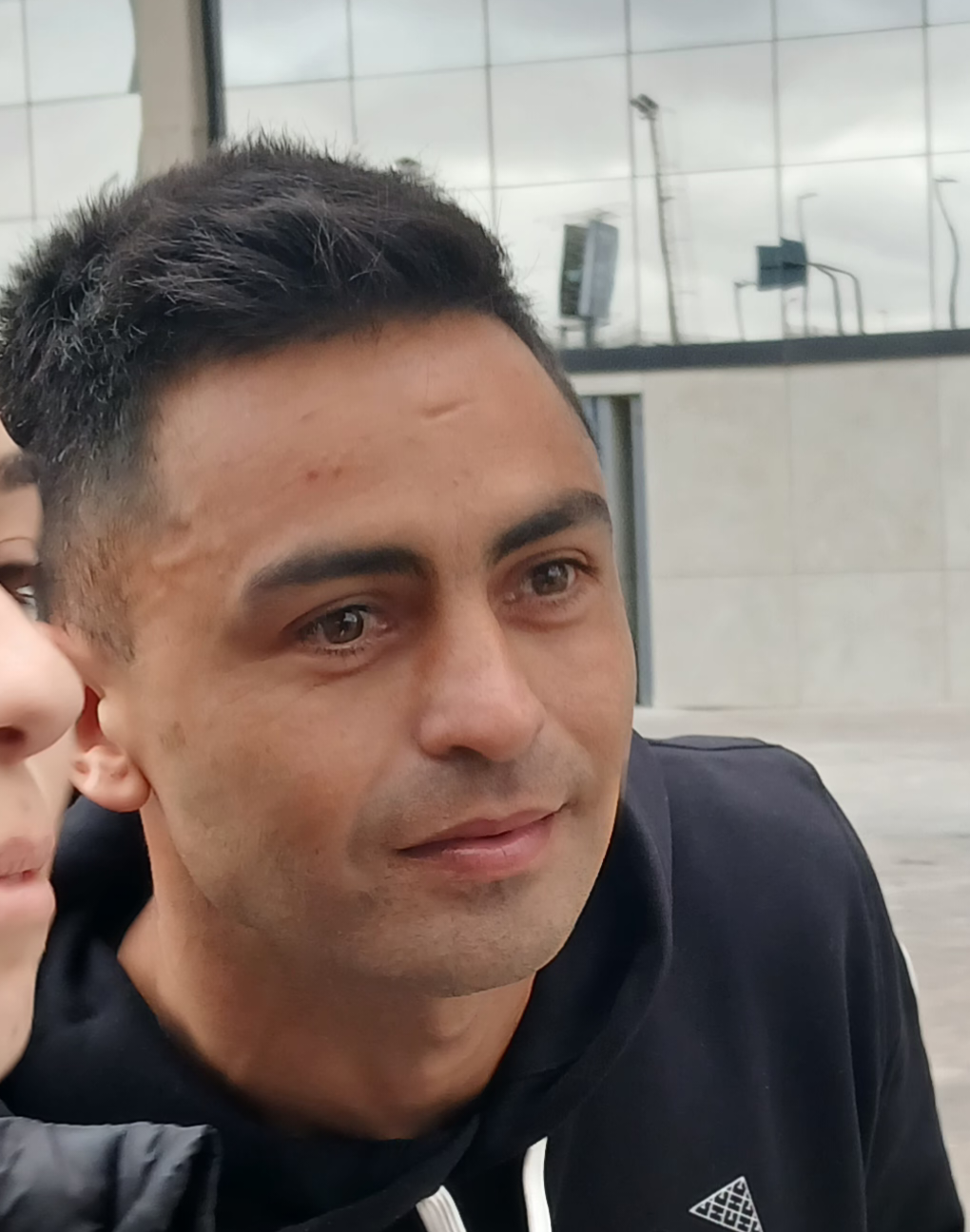
Pity Martínez, 2018 South American Footballer of the Year

The 2018 South American Footballer of the Year award (Spanish: Rey del Fútbol de América), given to the best football player in South America by Uruguayan newspaper El País through voting by journalists across the continent, was awarded to Argentine midfielder Gonzalo "Pity" Martínez of River Plate on December 31, 2018.

The award is part of the paper's "El Mejor de América" (The Best of America) awards, which also presents the awards for South American Coach of the Year (Entrenador del año en Sudamérica) and the Best XI (Equipo Ideal), composed of the best eleven players at their positions. Marcelo Gallardo of River Plate was named Coach of the Year.

== Best Player ==
Rank	Player	Nationality	Club	Votes
1	Gonzalo Martínez	Argentina	(Argentina) River Plate	130
2	Juan Fernando Quintero	Colombia	(Argentina) River Plate	49
3	Franco Armani	Argentina	(Argentina) River Plate	40
4	Josef Martínez	Venezuela	(United States) Atlanta United	23
5	Nahitan Nández	Uruguay	(Argentina) Boca Juniors	18
6	Wílmar Barrios	Colombia	(Argentina) Boca Juniors	15
7	Lucas Pratto	Argentina	(Argentina) River Plate	8
8	Dudu	Brazil	(Brazil) Palmeiras	7
9	Darío Benedetto	Argentina	(Argentina) Boca Juniors	6
9	Giorgian De Arrascaeta	Uruguay	(Brazil) Cruzeiro	6
11	Miguel Borja	Colombia	(Brazil) Palmeiras	5
12	Rafael Santos Borré	Colombia	(Argentina) River Plate	3
13	Cristian Pavón	Argentina	(Argentina) Boca Juniors	1
13	Luan	Brazil	(Brazil) Grêmio	1
13	André-Pierre Gignac	France	(Mexico) Tigres UANL	1
13	Lucas Lima	Brazil	(Brazil) Palmeiras	1
13	Pablo César Aguilar	Paraguay	(Mexico) Cruz Azul	1
13	Ramón Ábila	Argentina	(Argentina) Boca Juniors	1
13	Óscar Cardozo	Paraguay	(Paraguay) Libertad	1
13	Cristian Rodríguez	Uruguay	(Uruguay) Peñarol	1
13	Emanuel Herrera	Argentina	(Peru) Sporting Cristal	1
13	Pablo Escobar	Bolivia	(Bolivia) The Strongest	1

== Best Manager ==
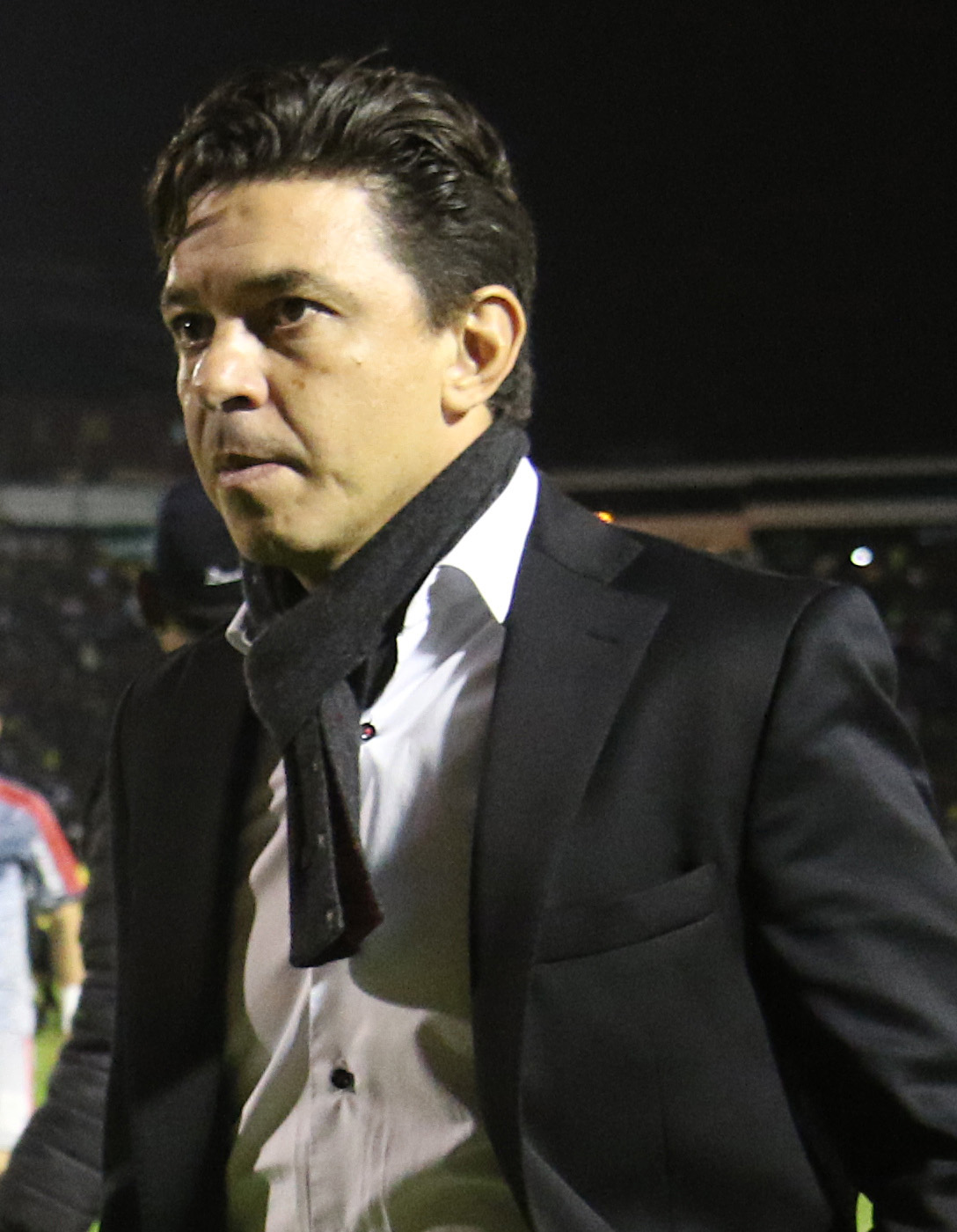
Marcelo Gallardo, 2018 South American Coach of the Year

Rank	Player	Nationality	Club / National team	Votes
1	Marcelo Gallardo	Argentina	(Argentina) River Plate	278
2	Ricardo Gareca	Argentina	Peru national team	16
3	Gerardo Martino	Argentina	(United States) Atlanta United	11
4	Tiago Nunes	Brazil	(Brazil) Atlético Paranaense	2
4	Renato Portaluppi	Brazil	(Brazil) Grêmio	2
4	Tite	Brazil	Brazil national team	2
7	Ariel Holan	Argentina	(Argentina) Independiente	1
7	César Farías	Venezuela	(Bolivia) The Strongest	1
7	Guillermo Barros Schelotto	Argentina	(Argentina) Boca Juniors	1
7	Óscar Tabárez	Uruguay	Uruguay national team	1
7	Diego López	Uruguay	(Uruguay) Peñarol	1
7	Lucas Pusineri	Argentina	(Colombia) Cúcuta Deportivo	1
7	Mario Salas	Chile	(Peru) Sporting Cristal	1
7	Pedro Caixinha	Portugal	(Mexico) Cruz Azul	1
7	Alexander Medina	Uruguay	(Uruguay) Nacional	1

== Best Team ==
Position	Player	Nationality	Club
GK	Franco Armani	Argentina	(Argentina) River Plate
CB	Walter Kannemann	Argentina	(Brazil) Grêmio
CB	Pedro Geromel	Brazil	(Brazil) Grêmio
CB	Jonatan Maidana	Argentina	(Argentina) River Plate
MF	Gonzalo Martínez	Argentina	(Argentina) River Plate
MF	Exequiel Palacios	Argentina	(Argentina) River Plate
MF	Wílmar Barrios	Colombia	(Argentina) Boca Juniors
MF	Nahitan Nández	Uruguay	(Argentina) Boca Juniors
MF	Juan Fernando Quintero	Colombia	(Argentina) River Plate
MF	Dudu	Brazil	(Brazil) Palmeiras
FW	Darío Benedetto	Argentina	(Argentina) Boca Juniors

== National awards ==
Nation	Best player	Best manager	Best team
Argentina	(Argentina) Lisandro López (Racing Club)	(Argentina) Marcelo Gallardo (River Plate)	Boca Juniors
Bolivia	(Bolivia) Pablo Escobar (The Strongest)	(Bolivia) Eduardo Villegas (San José)	San José
Brazil	(Brazil) Dudu (Palmeiras)	(Brazil) Luiz Felipe Scolari (Palmeiras)	Palmeiras
Chile	(Chile) José Pedro Fuenzalida (U. Católica)	(Chile) Francisco Bozán (U. de Concepción)	Universidad Católica
Colombia	(Argentina) Germán Cano (Independiente Medellín)	(Uruguay) Julio Comesaña (Junior)	Junior
Costa Rica	(Costa Rica) Jonathan Moya (Alajuelense)	(Argentina) Martín Cardetti (San Carlos)	Herediano
Ecuador	(Ecuador) Jhon Cifuente (U. Católica - ECU)	(Uruguay) Pablo Repetto (Liga de Quito)	Emelec
United States	(Venezuela) Josef Martinez (Atlanta United)	(Argentina) Gerardo Martino (Atlanta United)	Atlanta United
Honduras	(Colombia) Yustin Arboleda (Marathón)	(Argentina) Héctor Vargas (Marathón)	Motagua
Mexico	(France) André-Pierre Gignac (Tigres UANL)	(Portugal) Pedro Caixinha (Cruz Azul)	América
Paraguay	(Paraguay) Roque Santa Cruz (Club Olimpia)	(Argentina) Daniel Garnero (Club Olimpia)	Olimpia
Peru	(Argentina) Emanuel Herrera (Sporting Cristal)	(Chile) Mario Salas (Sporting Cristal)	Sporting Cristal
Uruguay	(Uruguay) Kevin Dawson (Peñarol)	(Uruguay) Diego López (Peñarol)	Peñarol
Venezuela	(Venezuela) Darwin González (Deportivo La Guaira)	(Venezuela) Alí Cañas (Zamora)	Zamora
