= José Enrique Peña =

Uruguayan footballer (born 1963)

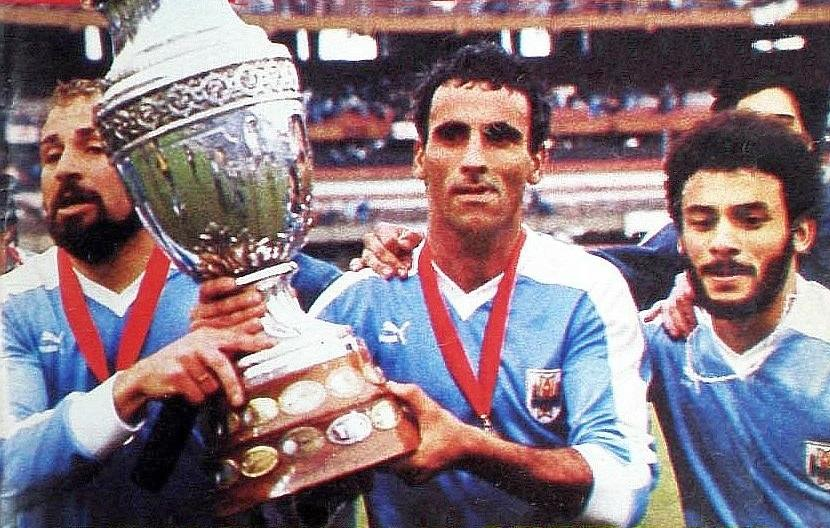
- Peña (left) with Antonio Alzamendi and Alfonso Domínguez after winning 1987 Copa América

Personal information
- Date of birth: 7 May 1963 (age 63)
- Place of birth: Montevideo, Uruguay
- Position: Midfielder

Senior career*
Years	Team	Apps	(Gls)
1981–1983	Huracán Buceo		
1984–1990	Montevideo Wanderers		
1991–1992	Nacional		
1992	Deportes Temuco		
1993	Nacional		
1994	Chaco For Ever		
1995	San Martín de Tucumán		
1995–1998	Huracán Buceo		

International career
1987	Uruguay	4	(0)
Medal record
Representing Uruguay
Copa América
Winner	1987 Argentina
- * Club domestic league appearances and goals

José Enrique Peña (born 7 May 1963) is a Uruguayan former footballer who played as a midfielder.

== Personal life ==
Peña is the father of the Uruguayan footballer Agustín Peña, whose twin brother Álvaro Enrique Peña is also a footballer.

== Honours ==
=== International ===
Uruguay

- Copa América (1): 1987
