= Eduardo da Silva (footballer, born 1966) =

Uruguayan footballer

Personal information
- Full name: Eduardo da Silva Díaz
- Date of birth: 19 August 1966 (age 60)
- Place of birth: Artigas, Uruguay
- Height: 1.73 m (5 ft 8 in)
- Position: Central midfielder

Senior career*
Years	Team	Apps	(Gls)
1985–1991	Peñarol	149	(22)
1992–1993	Talleres de Córdoba	10	(0)
1994–1996	Basáñez		

International career
1987–1989	Uruguay	2	(0)
Medal record
Representing Uruguay
Copa América
Winner	1987 Argentina
- * Club domestic league appearances and goals

Eduardo da Silva Díaz (born 19 March 1966) is a retired Uruguayan footballer. Playing for Peñarol, he won the 1987 Copa Libertadores.

== Honours ==
Peñarol

- Uruguayan Primera División (2): 1985, 1986
- Copa Libertadores (1): 1987

Uruguay

- Copa América (1): 1987
