= Álvaro Peña (Uruguayan footballer) =

Uruguayan footballer (born 1989)

Álvaro Enrique Peña
Personal information
- Full name: Álvaro Enrique Peña Montero
- Date of birth: 3 August 1989 (age 37)
- Place of birth: Montevideo
- Height: 1.85 m (6 ft 1 in)
- Position: Midfielder

Youth career
- Nacional

Senior career*
Years	Team	Apps	(Gls)
2009–2011	Nacional	0	(0)
2009–2010	→ Cerro Largo (loan)	10	(0)
2011–2012	Atenas	18	(1)
2012	Puntarenas	7	(2)
2013	Bella Vista	4	(2)
2013	Montedio Yamagata	1	(0)
2014	River Plate		
2015	Deportivo Capiatá	5	(0)
2015–2016	Boston River	2	(0)
2016	River Plate	6	(0)
2016	Rampla Juniors		
- * Club domestic league appearances and goals as of 19 September 2013

Álvaro Enrique Peña Montero (born 8 March 1989) is a Uruguayan footballer.

== Personal life ==
Peña was born in Montevideo. He is twin brother of Uruguayan footballer Agustín Peña and the son of the former Uruguayan international footballer José Enrique Peña.
