= Jorge Gonçálvez (footballer) =

Uruguayan footballer (born 1967)

Jorge Goncálvez
Personal information
- Full name: Jorge Miguel Goncálvez Rojo
- Date of birth: 2 March 1967 (age 59)
- Place of birth: Montevideo, Uruguay
- Height: 1.90 m (6 ft 3 in)
- Position: Defender

Senior career*
| Years | Team | Apps | (Gls) |
| 1986–1991 | Peñarol | 135 | (6) |
| 1992–1993 | Cruz Azul | 53 | (0) |
| 1994 | River Plate de Montevideo | 11 | (0) |
| 1995 | Cruz Azul | 16 | (0) |
| 1996 | Cerro | 12 | (1) |
| 1996 | Ferro Carril Oeste | 15 | (1) |
| 1997 | Cruz Azul | 7 | (0) |
| 1997–1998 | Peñarol | 33 | (2) |

International career
| 1988–1996 | Uruguay | 9 | (0) |
- * Club domestic league appearances and goals

Jorge Miguel Goncálvez Rojo (born 2 March 1967 in Montevideo) is a former Uruguayan footballer who played as a defender.

== Club career ==
Goncálvez played for Cruz Azul in the Primera División de Mexico and Ferro Carril Oeste in the Primera División de Argentina

== International career ==
Goncálvez made nine appearances for the senior Uruguay national football team from 1988 to 1996.

== Personal life ==
Jorge is the son of the former Uruguayan footballer, Néstor Gonçalves.
