= José Perdomo =

Uruguayan footballer (born 1965)

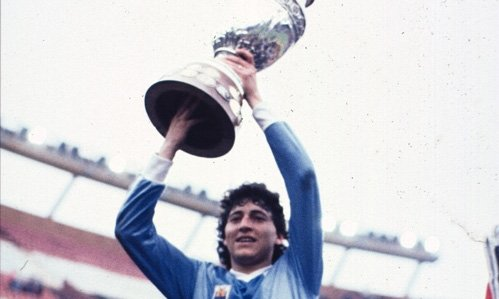
- Perdomo holding the 1987 Copa América

Personal information
- Full name: José Batlle Perdomo Teixeira
- Date of birth: 5 January 1965 (age 61)
- Place of birth: Salto, Uruguay
- Height: 1.82 m (6 ft 0 in)
- Position: Central midfielder

Senior career*
Years	Team	Apps	(Gls)
1983–1989	Peñarol	149	(34)
1989–1990	Genoa	25	(0)
1990	Coventry City	4	(0)
1990–1991	Real Betis	6	(1)
1991–1992	Gimnasia y Esgrima La Plata	18	(3)
1993	Peñarol	9	(0)
Total		211	(38)

International career
1987–1990	Uruguay	27	(2)

Managerial career
- 2000: Villa Española
- 2002: Tacuarembó
Medal record
Representing Uruguay
Copa América
Winner	1987 Argentina
Runner-up	1989 Brazil
- * Club domestic league appearances and goals

José Batlle Perdomo Teixeira (born 5 January 1965) is a Uruguayan former professional footballer who played as a midfielder.

Born in Salto, he started his career with Club Atlético Peñarol in 1983, being later noted in 1989 by Genoa head coach Franco Scoglio during a South-American scouting visit, being signed by the rossoblu together with fellow Uruguayans Carlos "Pato" Aguilera and Rubén Paz. Perdomo, who was expected to be a mainstay of the Genoa midfield line, played 25 unimpressive matches, being remembered only for his lack of pace and acceleration, as well as excessively playing aggressively. His poor performances later led Vujadin Boškov, head coach of crosstown rivals Sampdoria, to one of his famous quotes, declared just before the 1989–90 city derby:

"If I unleash my dog, it plays better than Perdomo."

He was sold to Spanish side Real Betis for the 1990–91, where he made just six appearances, scoring one goal. He moved to Gimnasia y Esgrima La Plata one year later. A notable incident during this spell saw him score a goal against local rivals Estudiantes, which was celebrated so vigorously that it registered as an earthquake on the seismological equipment at the La Plata Astronomical Observatory 600 meters away. From this Perdomo gained the nickname Terremoto (earthquake). He retired in 1994 after a season with Peñarol.
