= Obdulio Trasante =

Uruguayan footballer (born 1960)

Personal information
- Full name: Obdulio Eduardo Trasante
- Date of birth: 20 April 1960 (age 66)
- Place of birth: Juan Lacaze, Uruguay
- Height: 1.82 m (6 ft 0 in)
- Position: Defender

Senior career*
Years	Team	Apps	(Gls)
1980–1984	Central Español	59	(11)
1985–1987	Peñarol	82	(5)
1988	Grêmio	26	(0)
1988–1989	Deportivo Cali	31	(1)
1990–1992	Central Español		

International career
1987–1988	Uruguay	5	(0)
Medal record
Representing Uruguay
Copa América
Winner	1987 Argentina
- * Club domestic league appearances and goals

Obdulio Trasante (born 20 April 1960 in Juan Lacaze) is a former Uruguayan footballer.

== Career ==
Trasante played for Grêmio in the 1988 and 1989 Campeonato Brasileiro Série A. Trasante made five appearances for the senior Uruguay national football team from 1987 to 1988. He also played in the 1987 Copa América.
