= Eduardo Pereira =

Uruguayan footballer (born 1954)

Personal information
- Full name: Eduardo Pereira Martínez
- Date of birth: 21 March 1954 (age 72)
- Place of birth: Montevideo, Uruguay
- Height: 1.85 m (6 ft 1 in)
- Position: Goalkeeper

Senior career*
Years	Team	Apps	(Gls)
1974	Peñarol		
1975–1977	Guaraní		
1977–1979	Salamanca		
1979–1981	Espanyol		
1981–1983	Sabadell		
1984	Montevideo Wanderers	18	(0)
1985–1987	Peñarol	44	(0)
1988–1990	Independiente	35	(0)
1992	Central Español		
1993	Liverpool de Montevideo		

International career
1987–1990	Uruguay	10	(0)
Medal record
Representing Uruguay
Copa América
Winner	1987 Argentina
- * Club domestic league appearances and goals

Eduardo Pereira Martínez (born 21 March 1954) is a retired Uruguayan footballer who played as a goalkeeper.

== International career ==
Pereira made ten appearances for the senior Uruguay national football team from 1987 to 1990, including four 1990 FIFA World Cup qualifiers.
