= Alfonso Domínguez =

Uruguayan footballer (born 1965)

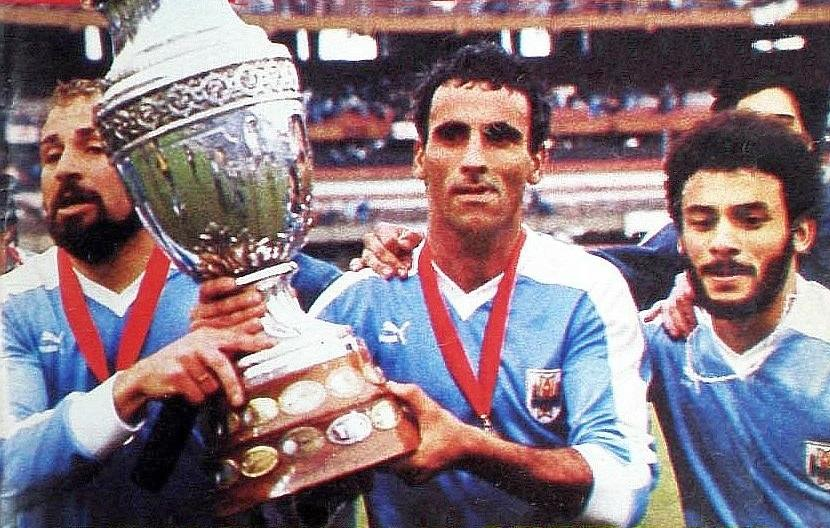
- Dominguez (right) with José Enrique Peña and Antonio Alzamendi after winning 1987 Copa América.

Personal information
- Full name: Alfonso Enrique Domínguez Maidana
- Date of birth: 24 September 1965 (age 61)
- Place of birth: Durazno, Uruguay
- Height: 1.69 m (5 ft 7 in)
- Position: Defender

Senior career*
Years	Team	Apps	(Gls)
1985–1991	Peñarol	154	(2)
1992–1993	River Plate	10	(0)
1994–1997	Nacional	65	(1)
1998–2000	Huracán Buceo	48	(0)
Total		277	(3)

International career
1987–1990	Uruguay	31	(0)
Medal record
Representing Uruguay
Copa América
Winner	1987 Argentina
Runner-up	1989 Brazil
- * Club domestic league appearances and goals

Alfonso Enrique Domínguez Maidana (born 24 September 1965) is a Uruguayan former footballer who played as a defender.

== Club career ==
Domínguez had a spell with River Plate in the Primera División de Argentina.

== International career ==
Domínguez made 31 appearances for the senior Uruguay national football team from 1987 to 1990, including playing at the 1990 FIFA World Cup finals.
