= 1997 Copa CONMEBOL finals =

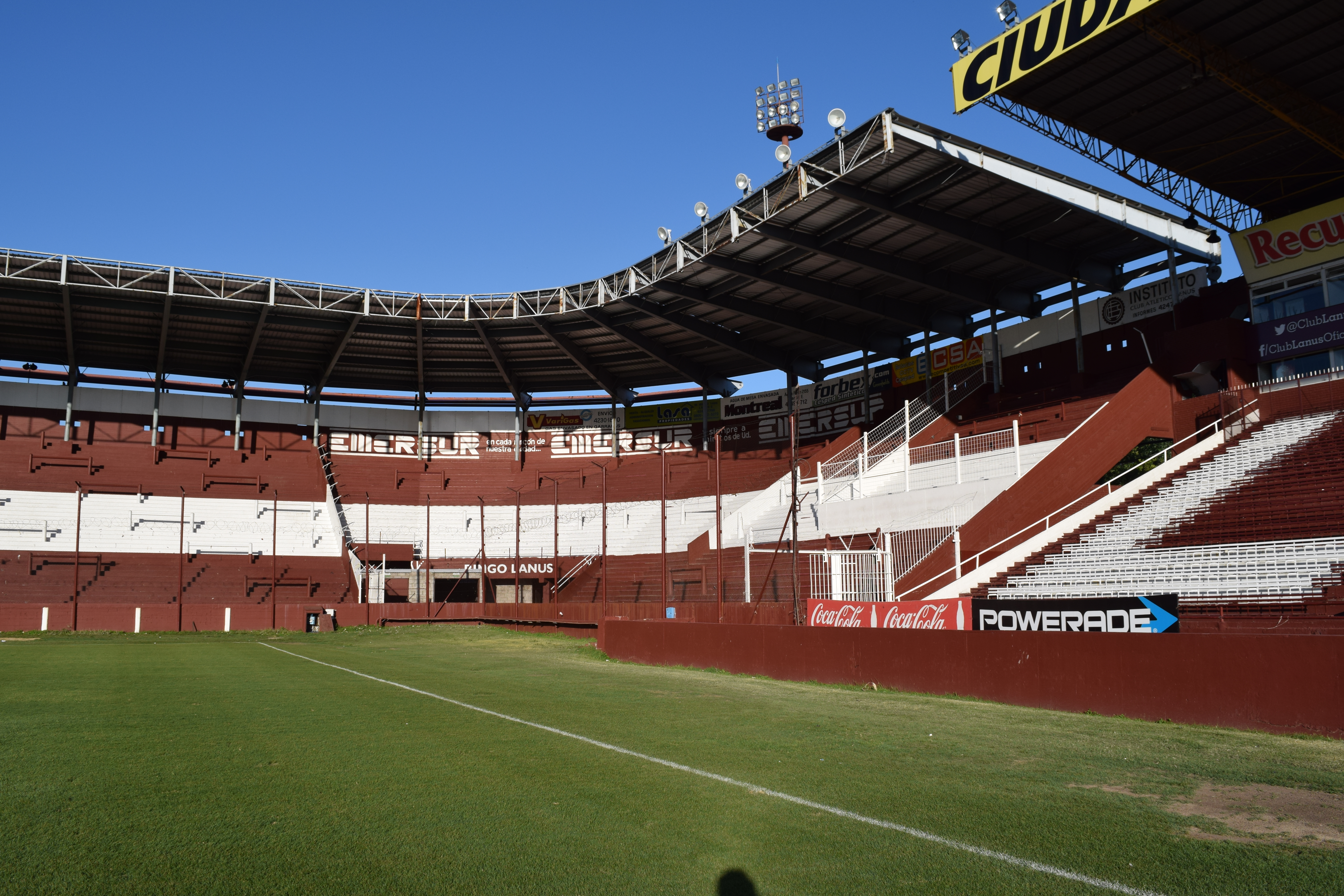
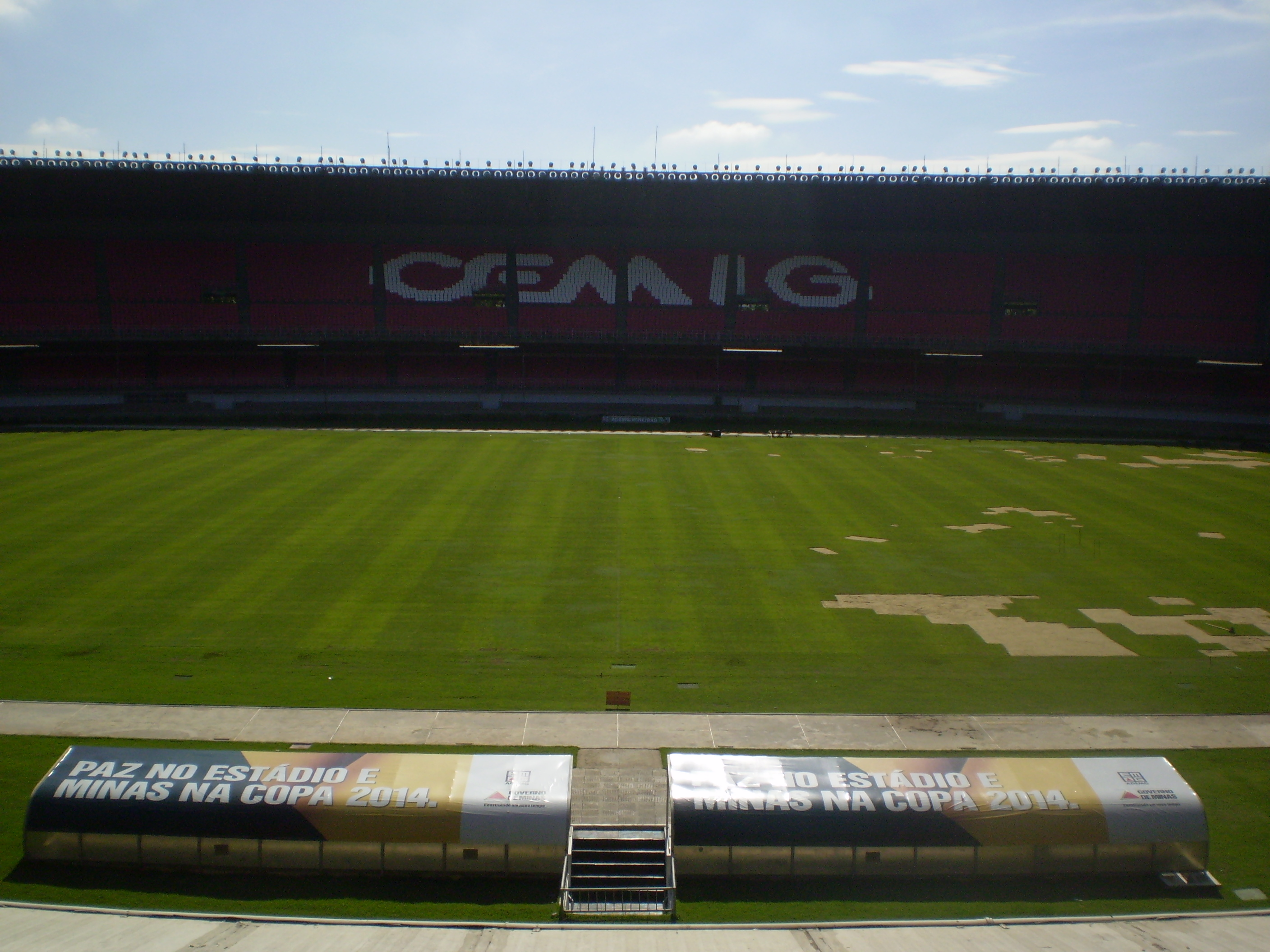
- Event: 1997 Copa CONMEBOL
Lanús	Atlético Mineiro
(Argentina)	(Brazil)
2	5

First leg
Lanús	Atlético Mineiro
1	4
- Date: 6 November 1997
- Venue: Estadio Ciudad de Lanús, Lanús
- Referee: Gustavo Gallesio (Uruguay)
- Attendance: 15,000

Second leg
Atlético Mineiro	Lanús
1	1
- Date: 17 December 1997
- Venue: Mineirão, Belo Horizonte
- Referee: Epifanio González (Paraguay)
- Attendance: 35,131

The 1997 Copa CONMEBOL finals were the final two-legged tie that decided the 1997 Copa CONMEBOL, the sixth edition of Copa CONMEBOL. The finals were contested in two-legged home-and-away format between Argentina's Lanús and Atlético Mineiro from Brazil. The matches were held at the Estadio Ciudad de Lanús, in Lanús, and at the Mineirão, in Belo Horizonte.

It was Lanús's second appearance in the finals of the Copa CONMEBOL, being the defending champions, while Atlético Mineiro reached the finals for the third time. Atlético Mineiro won the tie 5–2 claiming its second title in the competition.

== Background ==
The 1997 final was the first meeting between Atlético Mineiro and Lanús. Both sides went into the final chasing their second Copa CONMEBOL title. Lanús were the defending champions, and Atlético Mineiro had won the competition in 1992 and finished as runner-up in 1995.

== Qualified teams ==
Team	Previous final app.
(Argentina) Club Atlético Lanús	**1996**
(Brazil) Atlético Mineiro	**1992**, 1995

- **Bold** indicates winning years

== Route to the final ==
Note: In all scores below, the score of the home team is given first.

(Argentina) Lanús			Round	(Brazil) Atlético Mineiro		
Opponent	Venue	Score		Opponent	Venue	Score
(Bolivia) Real Santa Cruz (won 6–1 on aggregate)	Away	1–1	First round	(Brazil) Portuguesa (won 4–1 on aggregate)	Away	1–4
(Bolivia) Real Santa Cruz (won 6–1 on aggregate)	Home	5–0	First round	(Brazil) Portuguesa (won 4–1 on aggregate)	Home	0–0
(Brazil) Vitória (won 3–2 on aggregate)	Away	1–0	Quarter-finals	(Colombia) América de Cali (won 3–2 on aggregate)	Away	1–2
(Brazil) Vitória (won 3–2 on aggregate)	Home	3–1	Quarter-finals	(Colombia) América de Cali (won 3–2 on aggregate)	Home	1–1
(Argentina) Colón (won 3–1 on aggregate)	Away	0–2	Semi-finals	(Peru) Universitario (won 6–0 on aggregate)	Away	0–2
(Argentina) Colón (won 3–1 on aggregate)	Home	1–1	Semi-finals	(Peru) Universitario (won 6–0 on aggregate)	Home	4–0

== Matches ==
=== Summary ===
In the first match, held in Lanús's La Fortaleza on 6 November 1997, the home team opened the scoreline with Ariel Ibagaza, but Atlético Mineiro tied before the end of the second half with Bruno. An own goal by José Serrizuela in the second half gave the Brazilians the lead, followed by two more goals by the visitors, by Hernani and Valdir (who would finish as top goalscorer in the competition). After the end of the match, Lanús's defender Oscar Ruggeri assaulted Atlético Mineiro's Jorginho, and a brawl ensued. Atlético players and staff were trapped against the fence surrounding the pitch and attacked by Lanús players and supporters. Among other injured players and staff in the confrontation, Atlético's head coach Emerson Leão had to undergo surgery after being hit in the face.

The second match was played at the Mineirão, in Belo Horizonte, on 17 December 1997. Atlético Mineiro fielded four forwards in an attempt to rout Lanús again, but the lack of midfielders in the Brazilian team allowed the Argentine one to advance. Lanús had many youngsters in the squad, but had the match was even, with an Atlético Mineiro goal by Jorginho in the first half and the equaliser by Marcelo Trimarchi in the second. There were security concerns after the brawl in the first match, but no violent incidents occurred in Belo Horizonte.

=== Details ===
==== First leg ====
1997 Copa CONMEBOL Final
6 November 1997
21:10 (UTC−03:00)
First leg

Lanús (Argentina)	1–4	(Brazil) Atlético Mineiro
Ibagaza 19'		Bruno 41'; Serrizuela 56' (o.g.); Hernani 60'; Valdir 80'

Estadio Ciudad de Lanús, Lanús
Attendance: 15,000
Referee: Gustavo Gallesio (Uruguay)

**Lanús**	**At. Mineiro**

GK	1	(Argentina) Pedro Rómoli
DF	2	(Argentina) Juan J. Serrizuela
DF	25	(Argentina) Oscar Ruggeri
DF		(Argentina) Gustavo Siviero
DF		(Argentina) Mariano Fernández	(substituted off) a'
MF	8	(Argentina) Daniel Cravero
MF	15	(Argentina) Juan I. Fernández
MF	7	(Argentina) Ariel Ibagaza
MF		(Argentina) Sebastián Clotet	(substituted off) b'
FW	11	(Argentina) Ariel López
FW		(Argentina) Hernan Raíces	(substituted off) c'
Substitutes:
MF		(Argentina) Leonardo Mas	(substituted on) a'
MF		(Argentina) Walter Coyette	(substituted on) b'
FW		(Argentina) Marcelo Trimarchi	(substituted on) c'
Manager:
(Argentina) Mario Gómez

GK	1	(Brazil) Cláudio Taffarel
DF	5	(Brazil) Bruno
DF	3	(Brazil) Sandro Blum
DF	14	(Brazil) Sandro Barbosa
DF	6	(Brazil) Dedê
MF	16	(Brazil) Edgar	(substituted off) a'
MF	8	(Brazil) Doriva
MF	10	(Brazil) Jorginho
MF	22	(Brazil) Hernani
FW	9	(Brazil) Marques	(substituted off) b'
FW	7	(Brazil) Valdir	(substituted off) c'
Substitutes:
MF		(Brazil) Roberto	(substituted on) a'
MF		(Brazil) Almir	(substituted on) b'
FW		(Brazil) Cairo	(substituted on) c'
Manager:
(Brazil) Emerson Leão

==== Second leg ====
17 December 1997
12:30 (UTC−03:00)
Second leg

Atlético Mineiro (Brazil)	1–1	(Argentina) Lanús
Jorginho 10'		Trimarchi 57'

Mineirão, Belo Horizonte
Attendance: 35,131
Referee: Epifanio González (Paraguay)

**At. Mineiro**	**Lanús**

GK	1	(Brazil) Taffarel
DF	5	(Brazil) Bruno
DF		(Brazil) Neguete
DF	14	(Brazil) Sandro Barbosa
DF	6	(Brazil) Dedê	Booked
MF		(Brazil) Roberto
MF	10	(Brazil) Jorginho
MF	22	(Brazil) Hernani
FW	9	(Brazil) Marques
FW	8	(Brazil) Almir	Substituted off
FW	7	(Brazil) Valdir	Booked
Substitutes:
MF	16	(Brazil) Edgar	Substituted on Booked
Manager:
(Brazil) Emerson Leão

GK		(Argentina) Rodrigo Burela
DF		(Argentina) Gabriel Ramón
DF		(Argentina) Andrés Bressán
DF		(Argentina) Mariano Fernández
DF		(Argentina) Martin Román
MF	**8**	(Argentina) Daniel Cravero	Booked
MF		(Argentina) Claudio Huertas	(substituted off) a'
MF		(Argentina) Sebastián Clotet
MF		(Argentina) Leonardo Mas	(yellow card) (substituted off) b'
FW		(Argentina) Claudio Enría
FW		(Argentina) Marcelo Trimarchi	(substituted off) c'
Substitutes:
MF		(Argentina) Juan Di Alessio	(substituted on) a'
FW		(Argentina) Silvio González	(substituted on) b'
FW		(Argentina) Hernan Raíces	(substituted on) c'
Manager:
(Argentina) Mario Gómez

== See also ==
- 1997 Copa CONMEBOL
