= 1999 Copa CONMEBOL finals =

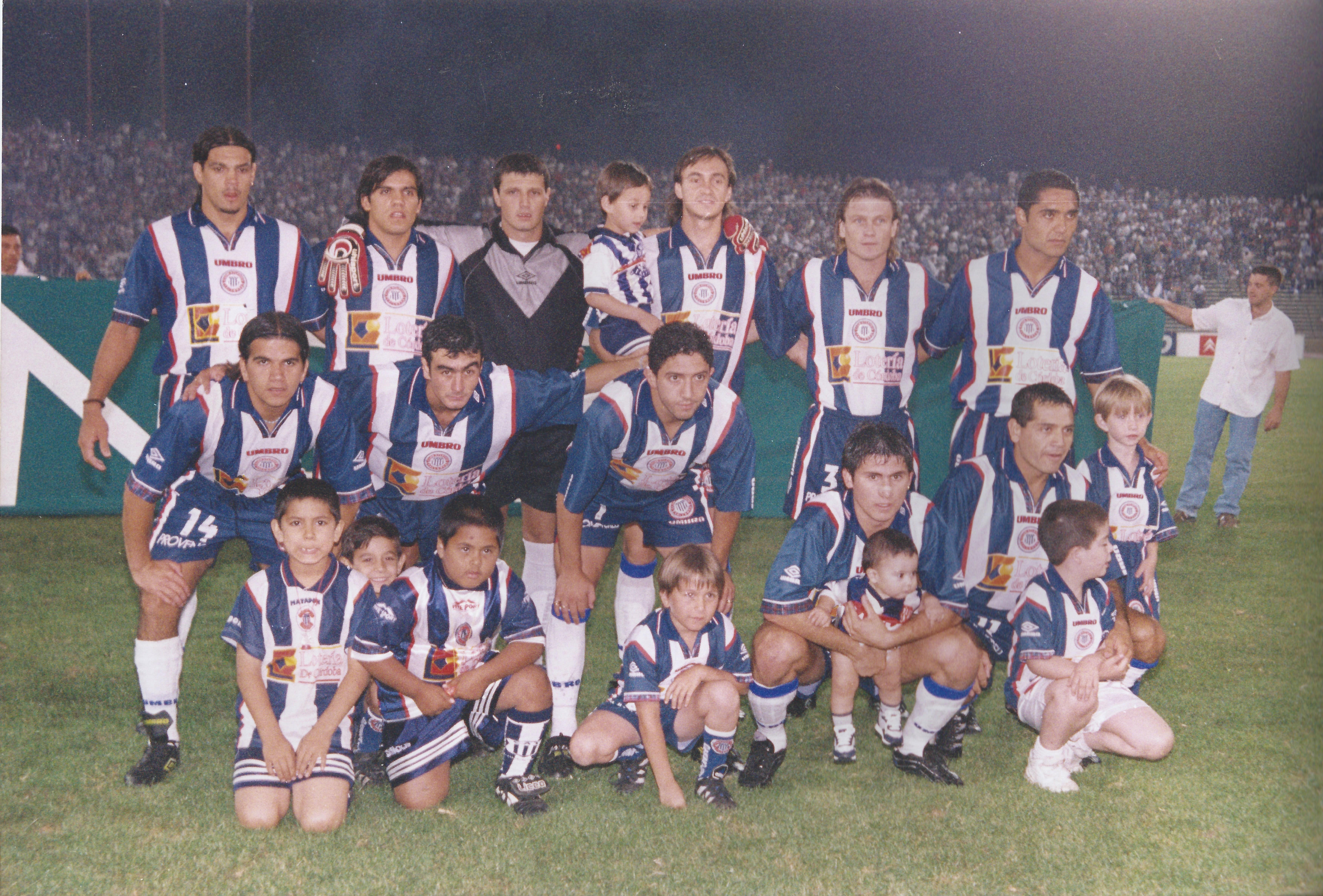
- Talleres de Córdoba, champions
- Event: 1999 Copa CONMEBOL
CSA	Talleres (C)
(Brazil)	(Argentina)
4	5
- (on aggregate)

First leg
CSA	Talleres (C)
4	2
- Date: December 1, 1999
- Venue: Estádio Rei Pelé, Maceió
- Referee: Roger Zambrano (Ecuador)
- Attendance: 30,000

Second leg
Talleres (C)	CSA
3	0
- Date: December 8, 1999
- Venue: Estadio Olímpico, Córdoba
- Referee: Ricardo Grance (Paraguay)
- Attendance: 33,000

The 1999 Copa CONMEBOL finals were the final match series to decide the winner of the 1999 Copa CONMEBOL, a continental cup competition organised by CONMEBOL. The final was contested by Argentine club Talleres de Córdoba and Brazilian CSA. This would also be the last edition of this trophy, which was discontinued after that.

CSA became the first club from Northeast Brazil to reach the final of a CONMEBOL competition, and the only one until Fortaleza in 2023.

Played under a two-legged tie system, CSA won the first leg held in Estádio Rei Pelé in Maceió, while Talleres won the second leg at Estadio Olímpico in Córdoba. Talleres won 5–4 on aggregate, achieving their first international title. That achievement is highly regarded to be not only the only international title for Talleres but for any team from Córdoba Province.

== Qualified teams ==
Team	Previous final app.
(Brazil) CSA	(none)
(Argentina) Talleres (C)	(none)

- **Bold** indicates winning years

== Venues ==
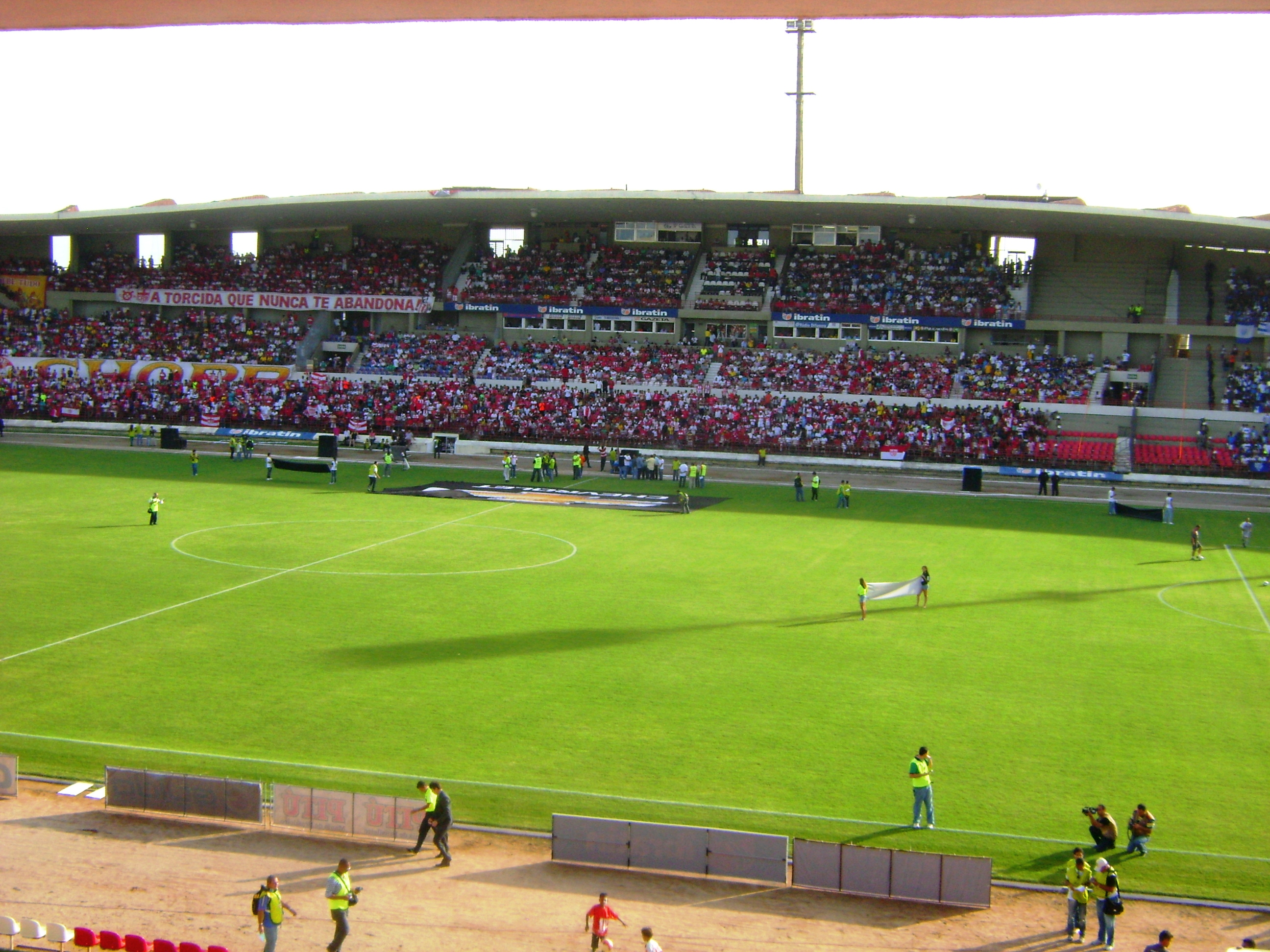
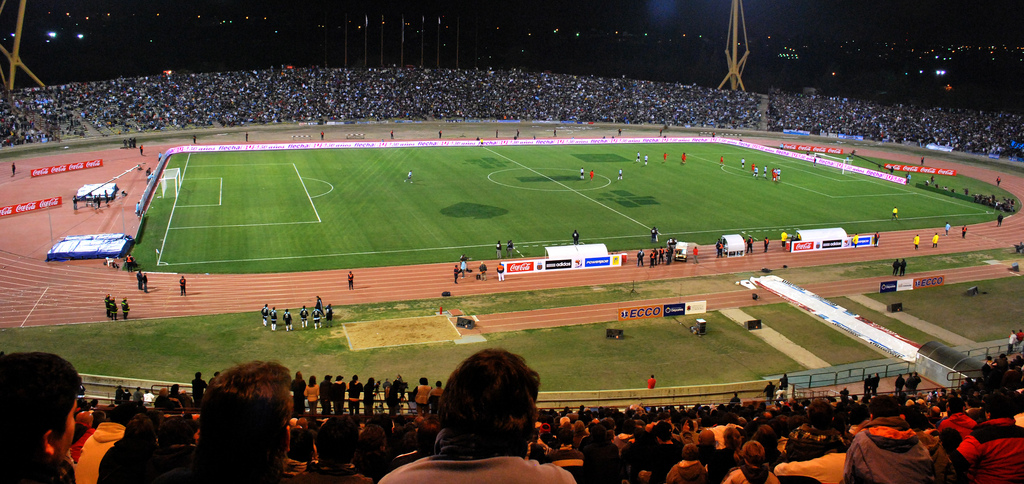
Estádio Rei Pelé (left) and Estadio Olímpico, venues for the series

== Route to the final ==
Note: In all scores below, the score of the home team is given first.

(Brazil) CSA			Round	(Argentina) Talleres		
Opponent	Venue	Score		Opponent	Venue	Score
(Brazil) Vila Nova (tied 2–2 on aggregate, won on penalties)	Home	2–0	First round	(Bolivia) Independiente Petrolero (tied 4–4 on aggregate, won on penalties)	Away	4–1
(Brazil) Vila Nova (tied 2–2 on aggregate, won on penalties)	Away	2–0 (3–4 p)	First round	(Bolivia) Independiente Petrolero (tied 4–4 on aggregate, won on penalties)	Home	3–0 (5–4 p)
(Venezuela) Estudiantes de Mérida (won 3–1 on aggregate)	Away	0–0	Quarter-finals	(Brazil) Paraná (tied 1–1 on aggregate, won on penalties)	Home	1–0
(Venezuela) Estudiantes de Mérida (won 3–1 on aggregate)	Home	3–1	Quarter-finals	(Brazil) Paraná (tied 1–1 on aggregate, won on penalties)	Away	1–0 (1–3 p)
(Brazil) São Raimundo (tied 2–2 on aggregate, won on penalties)	Away	1–0	Semi-finals	(Chile) Deportes Concepción (won 3–2 on aggregate)	Home	2–1
(Brazil) São Raimundo (tied 2–2 on aggregate, won on penalties)	Home	2–1 (5–3 p)	Semi-finals	(Chile) Deportes Concepción (won 3–2 on aggregate)	Away	1–1

== Match details ==
=== First leg ===
1999 Copa CONMEBOL Final
December 1, 1999
First leg

CSA (Brazil)	4–2	(Argentina) Talleres (C)
Missinho 3', 38', 47'; Fábio Magrao 15'	Report	Aguilar 18'; Astudillo 86'

Estádio Rei Pelé, Maceió
Attendance: 30,000
Referee: Roger Zambrano (Ecuador)

**CSA**	**Talleres (C)**

GK	1	(Brazil) Veloso
DF	17	(Brazil) Mazinho
DF	4	(Brazil) Márcio Pereira
DF	3	(Brazil) Jivago
DF	8	(Brazil) Williams	(substituted off) 78'
MF	5	(Brazil) Roberto Alves
MF	7	(Brazil) Léo
MF	10	(Brazil) Bruno Alves	(yellow card) (substituted off) 75'
MF	18	(Brazil) Fábio Magrão
FW	11	(Brazil) Missinho
FW	9	(Brazil) Mimi	(substituted off) 78'
Substitutes:
FW	2	(Brazil) Souza	(substituted on) 75'
FW	16	(Brazil) Luis Carlos	(substituted on) 78'
MF	6	(Brazil) Ramon	(substituted on) 78'
Manager:
(Brazil) Otávio Oliveira

GK	1	(Argentina) Mario Cuenca
DF	20	(Argentina) David Díaz	Booked
DF	2	(Argentina) Juan Maidana
DF	13	(Argentina) Cristian García
DF	18	(Paraguay) Silvio Suárez	Sent off (straight red)
MF	8	(Argentina) Cristian Pino	(yellow card) (substituted off) 45'
MF	15	(Argentina) Andrés Cabrera
MF	11	(Argentina) Manuel S. Aguilar	(substituted off) 74'
MF	14	(Argentina) Ricardo Silva
FW	7	(Argentina) Rodrigo Astudillo
FW	16	(Argentina) José L. Marzo	(yellow card) (substituted off) 62'
Substitutes:
FW	23	(Argentina) Gabriel Roth	(substituted on) 45' (yellow card)
FW	9	(Argentina) Darío Gigena	(substituted on) 62'
FW	22	(Argentina) Santiago Del Soto	(substituted on) 74'
Manager:
(Argentina) Ricardo Gareca

=== Second leg ===
December 8, 1999
Second leg

Talleres de Córdoba (Argentina)	3–0	(Brazil) CSA
Silva 39'; Gigena 75'; Maidana 90'	Report

Estadio Olímpico, Córdoba
Attendance: 33,000
Referee: Ricardo Grance (Paraguay)

**Talleres (C)**	**CSA**

GK	1	(Argentina) Mario Cuenca
DF	20	(Argentina) David Díaz	(substituted off) 66'
DF	2	(Argentina) Juan Maidana	Booked
DF	13	(Argentina) Cristian García
DF	3	(Argentina) Horacio Humoller
MF	23	(Argentina) Gabriel Roth	Booked
MF	5	(Argentina) Adrián Ávalos
MF	11	(Argentina) Manuel S. Aguilar
MF	14	(Argentina) Ricardo Silva	(substituted off) 90'
FW	7	(Argentina) Rodrigo Astudillo
FW	9	(Argentina) Darío Gigena
Substitutes:
FW	8	(Argentina) Cristian Pino	(substituted on) 66'
FW	16	(Argentina) José L. Marzo	(substituted on) 90'
Manager:
(Argentina) Ricardo Gareca

GK	1	(Brazil) Veloso	Booked
DF	17	(Brazil) Mazinho	Booked
DF	4	(Brazil) Márcio Pereira
DF	3	(Brazil) Jivago	Booked
DF	8	(Brazil) Williams
MF	6	(Brazil) Ramon	Booked
MF	7	(Brazil) Léo
MF	10	(Brazil) Bruno Alves	(substituted off) 58'
MF	18	(Brazil) Fábio Magrão	Sent off (straight red)
FW	11	(Brazil) Missinho
FW	9	(Brazil) Mimi	Booked
Substitutes:
FW	13	(Brazil) Fabinho	(substituted on) 58'
Manager:
(Brazil) Otávio Oliveira

== See also ==
- 1999 Copa CONMEBOL
