= 1992 Copa CONMEBOL finals =

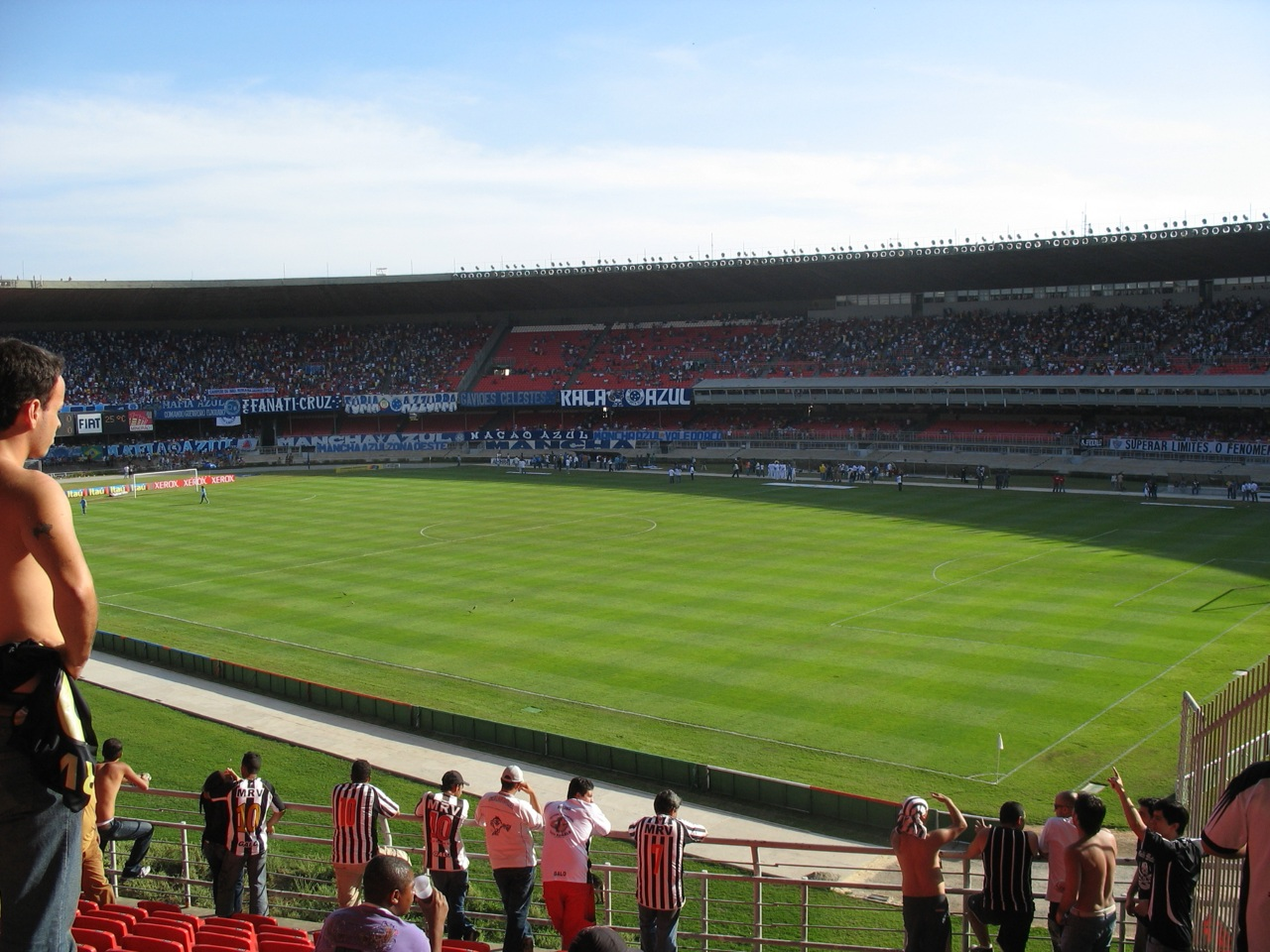
- Event: 1992 Copa CONMEBOL
Atlético Mineiro	Olimpia
(Brazil)	(Paraguay)
2	1

First leg
Atlético Mineiro	Olimpia
2	0
- Date: 16 September 1992
- Venue: Mineirão, Belo Horizonte
- Referee: Hernán Silva (Chile)
- Attendance: 60,116

Second leg
Olimpia	Atlético Mineiro
1	0
- Date: 23 September 1992
- Venue: Estadio Manuel Ferreira, Asunción
- Referee: Ernesto Filippi (Uruguay)
- Attendance: 23,000

The 1992 Copa CONMEBOL finals were the final two-legged series that decided the winner of 1992 Copa CONMEBOL, the first edition of this international competition. The finals were contested by Clube Atlético Mineiro of Brazil and Club Olimpia of Paraguay.

The matches were held at the Mineirão, in Belo Horizonte, and at Estadio Manuel Ferreira, in Asunción. Atlético Mineiro won the tie 2–1 to claim its first title in the competition, and qualified for the 1993 Copa de Oro and the 1993 Copa CONMEBOL through its victory.

== Qualified teams ==
Team	Previous final app.
(Brazil) Atlético Mineiro	(none)
(Paraguay) Olimpia	(none)

== Route to the final ==
Note: In all scores below, the score of the home team is given first.

(Brazil) Atlético Mineiro			Round	(Paraguay) Olimpia		
Opponent	Venue	Score		Opponent	Venue	Score
(Brazil) Fluminense (won 6–3 on aggregate)	Away	1–2	First round	(Bolivia) Oriente Petrolero (won 5–0 on aggregate)	Away	0–4
(Brazil) Fluminense (won 6–3 on aggregate)	Home	5–1	First round	(Bolivia) Oriente Petrolero (won 5–0 on aggregate)	Home	1–0
(Colombia) Junior (won 5–2 on aggregate)	Away	2–2	Quarter-finals	(Argentina) Deportivo Español (tied 0–0 on aggregate, won on penalties)	Home	0–0
(Colombia) Junior (won 5–2 on aggregate)	Home	3–0	Quarter-finals	(Argentina) Deportivo Español (tied 0–0 on aggregate, won on penalties)	Away	0–0 (3–4 p)
(Ecuador) El Nacional (won 2–1 on aggregate)	Away	1–0	Semi-finals	(Argentina) Gimnasia y Esgrima (tied 0–0 on aggregate, won on penalties)	Home	0–0
(Ecuador) El Nacional (won 2–1 on aggregate)	Home	2–0	Semi-finals	(Argentina) Gimnasia y Esgrima (tied 0–0 on aggregate, won on penalties)	Away	0–0 (0–3 p)

== Match details ==
=== First leg ===
16 September 1992
First leg

Atlético Mineiro (Brazil)	2–0	(Paraguay) Olimpia
Negrini 30', 58'

Mineirão, Belo Horizonte
Attendance: 60,116
Referee: Hernán Silva (Chile)

Atlético Mineiro	Olimpia

GK	(Brazil) João Leite	(substituted off) a'
DF	(Brazil) Alfinete
DF	(Brazil) Luís Eduardo
DF	(Brazil) Ryuler
DF	(Brazil) Paulo Roberto
MF	(Brazil) Éder Lopes
MF	(Brazil) Moacir
MF	(Brazil) Negrini
FW	(Brazil) Sérgio Araújo
FW	(Brazil) Aílton Delfino
FW	(Brazil) Claudinho
Substitutes:
GK	(Brazil) Humberto	(substituted on) a'
Manager:
(Brazil) Procópio Cardoso

GK	(Argentina) Sergio Goycochea
DF	(Paraguay) Virginio Cáceres
DF	(Paraguay) Mario César Ramírez
DF	(Paraguay) Isidoro Núñez
DF	(Paraguay) Silvio Suárez
MF	(Paraguay) Adolfo Jara
MF	(Paraguay) Vidal Sanabria
MF	(Paraguay) Jorge Luis Campos
MF	(Paraguay) Gabriel González	Substituted off
FW	(Paraguay) Raúl Amarilla	Substituted off
FW	(Paraguay) Miguel Sanabria
Substitutes:
MF	(Paraguay) Justo Javier Meza	Substituted on
FW	(Paraguay) Adriano Samaniego	Substituted on
Manager:
(Argentina) Roberto Perfumo

=== Second leg ===
23 September 1992

Olimpia (Paraguay)	1–0	(Brazil) Atlético Mineiro
Caballero 89'

Estadio Manuel Ferreira, Asunción
Attendance: 22,527
Referee: Ernesto Filippi (Uruguay)

Olimpia
Atlético Mineiro

GK	(Argentina) Sergio Goycochea
DF	(Paraguay) Virginio Cáceres	Substituted off
DF	(Paraguay) Mario César Ramírez
DF	(Paraguay) Isidro Núñez
DF	(Paraguay) Silvio Suárez
MF	(Paraguay) Adolfo Jara
MF	(Paraguay) Vidal Sanabria
MF	(Paraguay) Jorge Luis Campos	Substituted off
MF	(Paraguay) Gabriel González
FW	(Paraguay) Miguel Sanabria
FW	(Paraguay) Adriano Samaniego
Substitutes:
MF	(Paraguay) Justo Javier Meza	Substituted on
FW	(Paraguay) Mauro Caballero	Substituted on
Manager:
(Argentina) Roberto Perfumo

GK	(Brazil) João Leite
DF	(Brazil) Alfinete
DF	(Brazil) Luís Eduardo
DF	(Brazil) Ryuler
DF	(Brazil) Paulo Roberto
MF	(Brazil) Éder Lopes
MF	(Brazil) Moacir
MF	(Brazil) Negrini	Substituted off
FW	(Brazil) Sérgio Araújo
FW	(Brazil) Aílton Delfino	Substituted off
FW	(Brazil) Claudinho
Substitutes:
DF	(Brazil) André Figueiredo	Substituted on
MF	(Brazil) Toninho Pereira	Substituted on
Manager:
(Brazil) Procópio Cardoso

== See also ==
- 1992 Copa CONMEBOL
