= List of abolished CONMEBOL tournaments winning managers (1988–2001) =

This is a list of abolished CONMEBOL tournaments winning managers. Below are lists of head coaches who have won football tournaments which were played from 1988 to 2001 in South America (CONMEBOL zone).

These tournaments include:

- Supercopa Sudamericana - also known as the Supercopa Libertadores João Havelange, Supercopa Libertadores, Supercopa João Havelange or simply Supercopa, was a football club competition contested annually by the past winners of the Copa Libertadores. It was held from 1988 to 1997 and considered as second main continental tournament after Copa Libertadores.
- Copa CONMEBOL - the third most prestigious South American club competition between 1992 and 1999. Teams that were not able to qualify for the Copa Libertadores, played in this tournament.
- Copa Mercosur - was a football competition played from 1998 to 2001 by the traditional top clubs from Brazil, Argentina, Uruguay, Paraguay, and Chile. It was merged with Copa Merconorte and replaced by Copa Sudamericana in 2002.
- Copa Merconorte - competition played from 1998 to 2001 by clubs from Venezuela, Colombia, Ecuador, Peru, Bolivia, and later the United States, Costa Rica and Mexico. It was merged with Copa Mersur and replaced by Copa Sudamericana in 2002.

Also, CONMEBOL held other tournaments (Copa de Oro, Supercopa Masters, Copa Masters CONMEBOL), but they were not main continental competitions, were irregular, and participated among small number of teams.

Most often abolished CONMEBOL tournaments have been won by Brazilian coaches - 11 times, second place occupied by the Argentinians, with nine victories. This figure roughly corresponds to the number of titles of Brazilian and Argentine clubs, except for the victory of San Lorenzo de Almagro that won 2001 Copa Mercosur with Chilean specialist Manuel Pellegrini. Another foreign coach-winner was Luis Cubilla, Uruguayan, who led Paraguayan Club Olimpia to victory in 1990 Supercopa Libertadores. Only Cubilla and Brazilian Telê Santana (in 1993) won two the most prestigious club tournaments in South America during one calendar year.

The only coach, who won abolished CONMEBOL tournaments twice, was Émerson Leão. Moreover, he did it in a row with two different clubs - in 1997 he won Copa CONMEBOL with Atletico Mineiro, and year later same tournament with Santos.

== List of winners ==
=== Supercopa Libertadores ===
| Year | Coach | Club | Note |
|---|---|---|---|
| 1988 | (Argentina) Alfio Basile | (Argentina) Racing | |
| 1989 | (Argentina) Carlos Aimar | (Argentina) Boca Juniors | |
| 1990 | (Uruguay) Luis Cubilla | (Paraguay) Olimpia | |
| 1991 | (Brazil) Ênio Andrade | (Brazil) Cruzeiro | |
| 1992 | (Brazil) Jair Pereira | (Brazil) Cruzeiro | |
| 1993 | (Brazil) Telê Santana | (Brazil) São Paulo | |
| 1994 | (Argentina) Miguel Ángel Brindisi | (Argentina) Independiente | |
| 1995 | (Argentina) Miguel Ángel López | (Argentina) Independiente | |
| 1996 | (Argentina) Osvaldo Piazza | (Argentina) Vélez Sársfield | |
| 1997 | (Argentina) Ramón Díaz | (Argentina) River Plate | |

=== Copa CONMEBOL ===
| Year | Coach | Club | Note |
|---|---|---|---|
| 1992 | (Brazil) Procópio Cardoso | (Brazil) Atlético Mineiro | |
| 1993 | (Brazil) Carlos Alberto Torres | (Brazil) Botafogo | |
| 1994 | (Brazil) Muricy Ramalho | (Brazil) São Paulo | |
| 1995 | (Argentina) Ángel Tulio Zof | (Argentina) Rosario Central | |
| 1996 | (Argentina) Héctor Cúper | (Argentina) Lanús | |
| 1997 | (Brazil) Émerson Leão | (Brazil) Atlético Mineiro | |
| 1998 | (Brazil) Émerson Leão | (Brazil) Santos | |
| 1999 | (Argentina) Ricardo Gareca | (Argentina) Talleres | |

=== Copa Master de Supercopa ===
| Year | Coach | Club | Note |
|---|---|---|---|
| 1992 | (Uruguay) Oscar Tabárez | (Argentina) Boca Juniors | |
| 1995 | (Brazil) Carlos Alberto Silva | (Brazil) Cruzeiro | |

=== Copa de Oro ===
| Year | Coach | Club | Note |
|---|---|---|---|
| 1993 | (Argentina) Jorge Habegger | (Argentina) Boca Juniors | |
| 1995 | (Brazil) Ênio Andrade | (Brazil) Cruzeiro | |
| 1996 | (Brazil) Joel Santana | (Brazil) Flamengo | |

=== Copa Master de CONMEBOL ===
| Year | Coach | Club | Note |
|---|---|---|---|
| 1996 | (Brazil) Muricy Ramalho | (Brazil) São Paulo | |

=== Copa Mercosur ===
| Year | Coach | Club | Note |
|---|---|---|---|
| 1998 | (Brazil) Luiz Felipe Scolari | (Brazil) Palmeiras | |
| 1999 | (Brazil) Carlinhos | (Brazil) Flamengo | |
| 2000 | (Brazil) Joel Santana | (Brazil) Vasco da Gama | |
| 2001 | (Chile) Manuel Pellegrini | (Argentina) San Lorenzo | |

=== Copa Merconorte ===
| Year | Coach | Club | Note |
|---|---|---|---|
| 1998 | (Colombia) Gabriel Jaime Gómez | (Colombia) Atlético Nacional | |
| 1999 | (Colombia) Jaime De La Pava | (Colombia) América | |
| 2000 | (Colombia) Carlos Navarrete | (Colombia) Atlético Nacional | |
| 2001 | (Colombia) Luis Augusto García | (Colombia) Millonarios | |
