= List of Copa CONMEBOL finals =

- Founded: 1992
- Abolished: 1999
- Region: South America (CONMEBOL)
- Teams: 16 (first round); 2 (finalists)
- Last champions: (Argentina) Talleres (1st title)
- Most championships: (Brazil) Atlético Mineiro (2 titles)

The Copa CONMEBOL was an annual association football tournament established in 1992. The competition was organized by the South American Football Confederation, or CONMEBOL, and it was usually contested by 16 clubs from its member associations. The tournament ended in 1999, following the expansion of Copa Libertadores to 32 teams. The Copa Mercosur and Copa Merconorte, which both started in 1998, replaced the Copa CONMEBOL, and the merger of those 3 cups transformed in the current Copa Sudamericana.

The finals are contested over two legs, one at each participating club's stadium. Atlético Mineiro won the inaugural competition in 1992, defeating Olimpia. Seven clubs have won the competition since its inception. Atlético Mineiro holds the record for the most victories, winning the competition two times. Teams from Brazil have won the competition the most, with five wins among them.

== Finals ==
=== Key ===
#	Finals decided on goal aggregate
*	Finals decided by a penalty shootout
**Bold**	Indicates the winner over two legs
Year	Each link is the relevant Copa CONMEBOL article for that year

Year	Country	Home team	Score	Away team	Country	Venue	Location	Refs
1992	BRA	**Atlético Mineiro**	2–0	Olimpia	PAR	Mineirão	Belo Horizonte, Brazil	
1992	PAR	Olimpia	1–0	**Atlético Mineiro**	BRA	Estadio Manuel Ferreira	Asunción, Paraguay	
1992	2–2 on points; Atlético Mineiro won 2–1 on aggregate #							
1993	URU	Peñarol	1–1	**Botafogo**	BRA	Estadio Centenario	Montevideo, Uruguay	
1993	BRA	**Botafogo**	2–2	Peñarol	URU	Estádio do Maracanã	Rio de Janeiro, Brazil	
1993	2–2 on points and 3–3 on aggregate; Botafogo won 3–1 in a penalty shootout *							
1994	BRA	**São Paulo**	6–1	Peñarol	URU	Estádio do Morumbi	São Paulo, Brazil	
1994	URU	Peñarol	3–0	**São Paulo**	BRA	Estadio Centenario	Montevideo, Uruguay	
1994	3–3 on points; São Paulo won 6–4 on aggregate #							
1995	BRA	Atlético Mineiro	4–0	**Rosario Central**	ARG	Mineirão	Belo Horizonte, Brazil	
1995	ARG	**Rosario Central**	4–0	Atlético Mineiro	BRA	Estadio Gigante de Arroyito	Rosario, Argentina	
1995	3–3 on points and 4–4 on aggregate; Rosario Central won 4–3 in a penalty shootout *							
1996	ARG	**Lanús**	2–0	Santa Fe	COL	La Fortaleza	Lanús, Argentina	
1996	COL	Santa Fe	1–0	**Lanús**	ARG	Estadio El Campín	Bogotá, Colombia	
1996	3–3 on points; Lanús won 2–1 on aggregate #							
1997	ARG	Lanús	1–4	**Atlético Mineiro**	BRA	La Fortaleza	Lanús, Argentina	
1997	BRA	**Atlético Mineiro**	1–1	Lanús	ARG	Mineirão	Belo Horizonte, Brazil	
1997	Atlético Mineiro won 4–1 on points							
1998	BRA	**Santos**	1–0	Rosario Central	ARG	Estádio Vila Belmiro	Santos, Brazil	
1998	ARG	Rosario Central	0–0	**Santos**	BRA	Estadio Gigante de Arroyito	Rosario, Argentina	
1998	Santos won 4–1 on points							
1999	BRA	CSA	4–2	**Talleres**	ARG	Estádio Rei Pelé	Maceió, Brazil	
1999	ARG	**Talleres**	3–0	CSA	BRA	Estadio Olímpico Chateau Carreras	Córdoba, Argentina	
1999	3–3 on points; Talleres won 5–4 on aggregate #							

== General performances ==
=== By club ===
Club	Titles	Runners-up	Seasons won	Seasons runner-up
(Brazil) Atlético Mineiro	2	1	1992, 1997	1995
(Argentina) Rosario Central	1	1	1995	1998
(Argentina) Lanús	1	1	1996	1997
(Brazil) Botafogo	1	0	1993	—
(Brazil) São Paulo	1	0	1994	—
(Brazil) Santos	1	0	1998	—
(Argentina) Talleres	1	0	1999	—
(Uruguay) Peñarol	0	2	—	1993, 1994
(Paraguay) Olimpia	0	1	—	1992
(Colombia) Santa Fe	0	1	—	1996
(Brazil) CSA	0	1	—	1999

=== By city ===
City	Won	Runners-Up	Winning Clubs	Runners-Up
(Brazil) Belo Horizonte	2	1	Atlético Mineiro (2)	Atlético Mineiro (1)
(Argentina) Lanús	1	1	Lanús (1)	Lanús (1)
(Argentina) Rosario	1	1	Rosario Central (1)	Rosario Central (1)
(Brazil) São Paulo	1	0	São Paulo (1)	—
(Brazil) Santos	1	0	Santos (1)	—
(Argentina) Córdoba	1	0	Talleres (1)	—
(Brazil) Rio de Janeiro	1	0	Botafogo (1)	—
(Uruguay) Montevideo	0	2	—	Peñarol (2)
(Brazil) Maceió	0	1	—	CSA (1)
(Paraguay) Asunción	0	1	—	Olimpia (1)
(Colombia) Bogotá	0	1	—	Santa Fe (1)

=== By country ===
Country	Won	Runners-Up	Winning Clubs	Runners-Up
Brazil	5	2	Atlético Mineiro (2); Botafogo (1); São Paulo (1); Santos (1)	Atlético Mineiro (1); CSA (1)
Argentina	3	2	Rosario Central (1); Lanús (1); Talleres (1);	Rosario Central (1); Lanús (1)
Uruguay	0	2	—	Peñarol (2)
Paraguay	0	1	—	Olimpia (1)
Colombia	0	1	—	Santa Fe (1)

=== Number of participating clubs by country ===
- Years in bold: winner of the edition.
- Years in italics: runner-up of the edition.

Nation	#	Clubs	Years
Brazil (21)	5	Atlético Mineiro	**1992**, 1993, 1995, 1997, 1998
Brazil (21)	3	Bragantino	1992, 1993, 1996
Brazil (21)	3	Fluminense	1992, 1993, 1996
Brazil (21)	2	Grêmio	1992, 1994
Brazil (21)	2	Botafogo	**1993**, 1994
Brazil (21)	2	Vasco da Gama	1993, 1996
Brazil (21)	2	Corinthians	1994, 1995
Brazil (21)	2	Vitória	1994, 1997
Brazil (21)	1	São Paulo	**1994**
Brazil (21)	1	Ceará	1995
Brazil (21)	1	Guarani	1995
Brazil (21)	1	Palmeiras	1996
Brazil (21)	1	Portuguesa	1997
Brazil (21)	1	Rio Branco	1997
Brazil (21)	1	América (RN)	1998
Brazil (21)	1	Sampaio Corrêa	1998
Brazil (21)	1	Santos	**1998**
Brazil (21)	1	CSA	1999
Brazil (21)	1	Paraná	1999
Brazil (21)	1	São Raimundo	1999
Brazil (21)	1	Vila Nova	1999
Argentina (9)	4	Rosario Central	**1995**, 1996, 1998, 1999
Argentina (9)	3	Gimnasia y Esgrima (LP)	1992, 1995, 1998
Argentina (9)	3	Lanús	1994, **1996**, 1997
Argentina (9)	2	Deportivo Español	1992, 1993
Argentina (9)	2	Huracán	1993, 1994
Argentina (9)	2	San Lorenzo	1993, 1994
Argentina (9)	1	Vélez Sársfield	1992
Argentina (9)	1	Colón	1997
Argentina (9)	1	Talleres	**1999**
Colombia (8)	2	América de Cali	1995, 1997
Colombia (8)	2	Deportes Tolima	1996, 1997
Colombia (8)	2	Deportes Quindío	1998, 1999
Colombia (8)	1	Junior	1992
Colombia (8)	1	Independiente Medellín	1995
Colombia (8)	1	Santa Fe	1996
Colombia (8)	1	Once Caldas	1998
Colombia (8)	1	Atlético Huila	1999
Uruguay (8)	4	Danubio	1992, 1993, 1994, 1997
Uruguay (8)	3	Peñarol	1992, 1993, 1994
Uruguay (8)	3	River Plate	1996, 1998, 1999
Uruguay (8)	2	Defensor Sporting	1995, 1997
Uruguay (8)	1	Sud América	1995
Uruguay (8)	1	Porongos	1996
Uruguay (8)	1	Huracán Buceo	1998
Uruguay (8)	1	Rentistas	1999
Peru (7)	2	Universitario	1992, 1997
Peru (7)	1	Deportivo Sipesa	1993
Peru (7)	1	Sporting Cristal	1994
Peru (7)	1	Ciclista Lima	1995
Peru (7)	1	Alianza Lima	1996
Peru (7)	1	Melgar	1998
Peru (7)	1	Sport Boys	1999
Venezuela (7)	3	Unión Atlético Táchira	1993, 1996, 1997
Venezuela (7)	2	Estudiantes de Mérida	1997, 1999
Venezuela (7)	1	Marítimo	1992
Venezuela (7)	1	Caracas	1993
Venezuela (7)	1	Minervén	1994
Venezuela (7)	1	Mineros de Guayana	1995
Venezuela (7)	1	Deportivo Chacao	1998,
Bolivia (6)	2	Oriente Petrolero	1992, 1994
Bolivia (6)	2	The Strongest	1995, 1997
Bolivia (6)	1	Bolívar	1996
Bolivia (6)	1	Real Santa Cruz	1997
Bolivia (6)	1	Jorge Wilstermann	1998
Bolivia (6)	1	Independiente Petrolero	1999
Chile (6)	2	Universidad de Chile	1994, 1997
Chile (6)	2	Cobreloa	1995, 1996
Chile (6)	1	O'Higgins	1992
Chile (6)	1	Colo-Colo	1993
Chile (6)	1	Audax Italiano	1998
Chile (6)	1	Deportes Concepción	1999
Ecuador (6)	2	El Nacional	1992, 1994
Ecuador (6)	2	Emelec	1993, 1996
Ecuador (6)	1	Barcelona	1995
Ecuador (6)	1	Técnico Universitario	1997
Ecuador (6)	1	LDU Quito	1998
Ecuador (6)	1	Deportivo Cuenca	1999
Paraguay (6)	2	Sportivo Luqueño	1993, 1997
Paraguay (6)	2	Cerro Corá	1994, 1998
Paraguay (6)	1	Olimpia	1992
Paraguay (6)	1	Colegiales	1995
Paraguay (6)	1	Guaraní	1996
Paraguay (6)	1	San Lorenzo	1999
