= 1996 Copa CONMEBOL finals =

- Event: 1996 Copa CONMEBOL
Lanús	Santa Fe
(Argentina)	(Colombia)
2	1
- (on aggregate)

First leg
Lanús	Santa Fe
2	0
- Date: November 20, 1996
- Venue: Estadio Ciudad de Lanús, Lanús
- Referee: Carlos Robles (Chile)

Second leg
Santa Fe	Lanús
1	0
- Date: December 4, 1996
- Venue: Estadio El Campín, Bogotá
- Referee: António Pereira (Brazil)
- Attendance: 55,000

The 1996 Copa CONMEBOL finals were the final match series to decide the winner of the 1996 Copa CONMEBOL, a continental cup competition organised by CONMEBOL. The final was contested by Argentine club Club Atlético Lanús and Colombian Independiente Santa Fe.

Played under a two-legged tie system, Lanús won the first leg held in Estadio Ciudad de Lanús in Lanús, while Santa Fe won the second leg at Estadio El Campín, Bogotá. Lanús won 2–1 on aggregate, achieving their first international title.

== Qualified teams ==
Team	Previous final app.
(Argentina) Club Atlético Lanús	(none)
(Colombia) Santa Fe	(none)

- **Bold** indicates winning years

== Venues ==
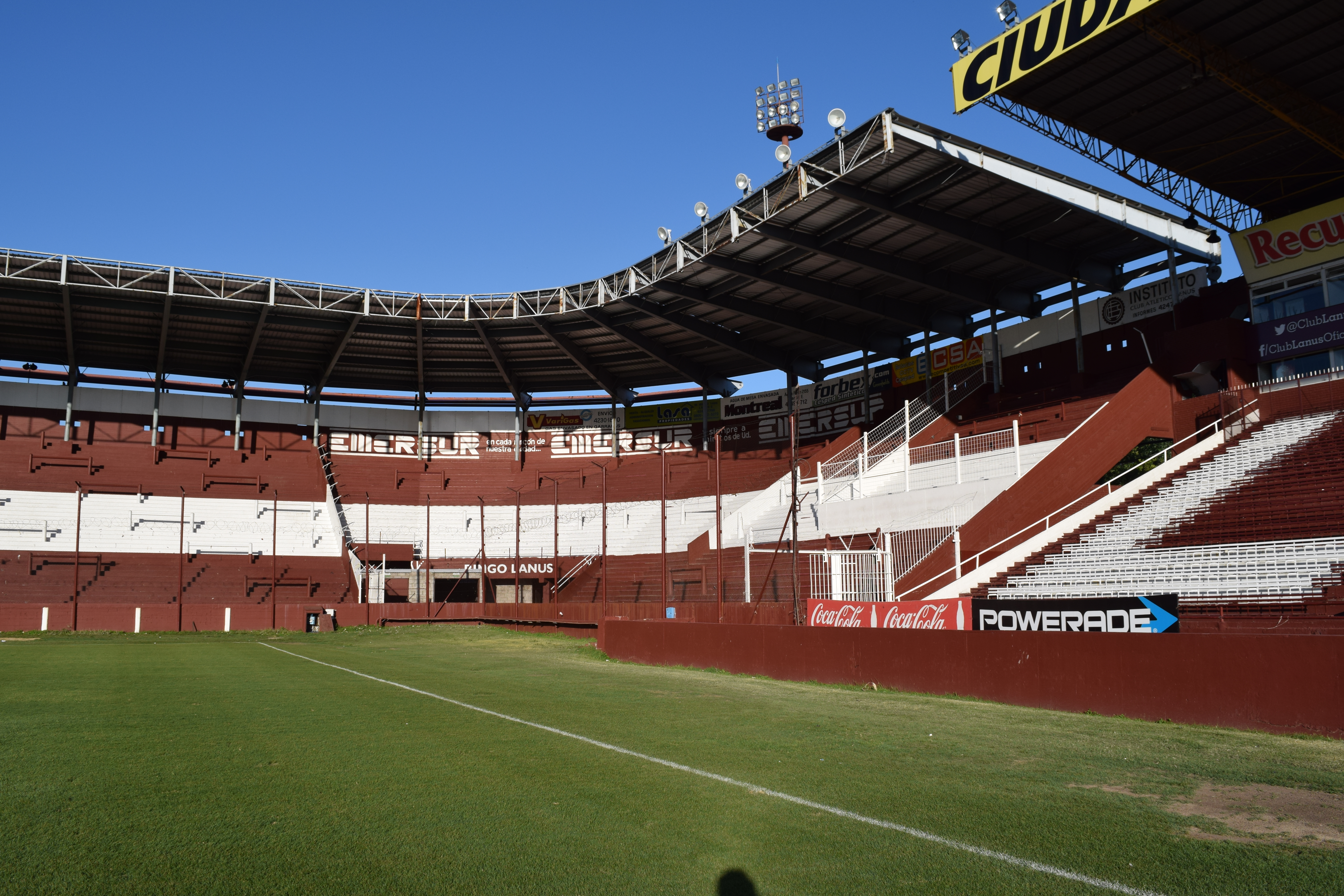
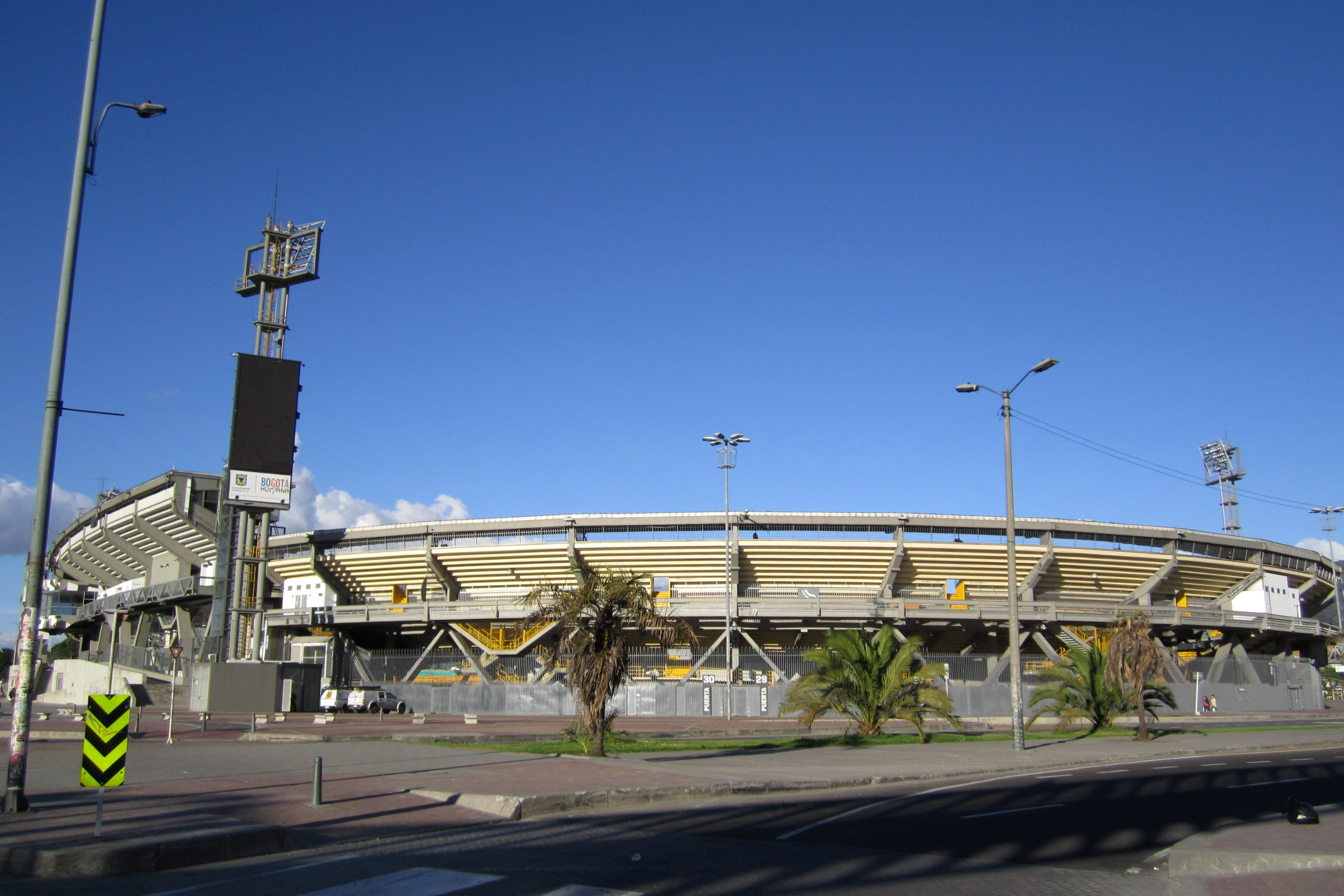
Estadio Ciudad de Lanús (left) and Estadio El Campín, venues for the series

== Route to the final ==
Note: In all scores below, the score of the home team is given first.

(Argentina) Lanús			Round	(Colombia) Santa Fe		
Opponent	Venue	Score		Opponent	Venue	Score
(Bolivia) Bolívar (won 4–2 on aggregate)	Away	1–0	First round	(Venezuela) Deportivo Táchira (won 5–2 on aggregate)	Away	2–2
(Bolivia) Bolívar (won 4–2 on aggregate)	Home	4–1	First round	(Venezuela) Deportivo Táchira (won 5–2 on aggregate)	Home	3–0
(Paraguay) Guaraní (won 8–2 on aggregate)	Away	0–2	Quarter-finals	(Brazil) Bragantino (won 1–0 on aggregate)	Home	1–0
(Paraguay) Guaraní (won 8–2 on aggregate)	Home	6–2	Quarter-finals	(Brazil) Bragantino (won 1–0 on aggregate)	Away	0–0
(Argentina) Rosario Central (won 6–1 on aggregate)	Home	3–0	Semi-finals	(Brazil) Vasco da Gama (tied 2–2 on aggregate, won on penalties)	Away	2–1
(Argentina) Rosario Central (won 6–1 on aggregate)	Away	1–3	Semi-finals	(Brazil) Vasco da Gama (tied 2–2 on aggregate, won on penalties)	Home	1–0 (6–5 p)

== Match details ==
=== First leg ===
1996 Copa CONMEBOL Final
November 20, 1996
First leg

Lanús (Argentina)	2–0	(Colombia) Santa Fe
Mena 31'; Ibagaza 76'	Report

Estadio Ciudad de Lanús, Lanús
Referee: Carlos Robles (Chile)

**Lanús**	**Santa Fe**

GK	1	(Argentina) Carlos Roa
DF	14	(Argentina) Juan J. Serrizuela
DF	2	(Argentina) Gustavo Falaschi
DF	6	(Argentina) Gustavo Siviero	Booked
DF	23	(Argentina) Andrés Bressán
MF	8	(Argentina) Oscar Mena
MF	5	(Argentina) Daniel Cravero (c)
MF	15	(Argentina) Walter Coyette
MF	7	(Argentina) Ariel Ibagaza
FW	9	(Argentina) Claudio Enría
FW	11	(Argentina) Ariel M. López
Substitutes:
FW	19	(Argentina) Gonzalo Belloso
FW		(Bolivia) Milton Coimbra
MF	21	(Argentina) Claudio Lacosegliaz
Manager:
(Argentina) Héctor Cúper

GK	1	(Venezuela) Rafael Dudamel
DF	19	(Colombia) Nelson Flórez	(substituted off) 80'
DF	15	(Colombia) Grigori Méndez (c)
DF	2	(Colombia) Orlando Garcés
DF	5	(Colombia) Óscar Upegui
MF	20	(Colombia) Jorge Salcedo	Booked
MF	17	(Colombia) Robert Villamizar
MF	14	(Colombia) Nélson Hurtado	Booked
MF	7	(Colombia) Roberto Vidales	(substituted off) 46'
MF	11	(Colombia) Francisco Wittingham
FW	9	(Colombia) Farley Hoyos	(substituted off) 62'
Substitutes:
FW	18	(Argentina) Silverio Penayo	(substituted on) 46'
FW	16	(Colombia) Gustavo Díaz	(substituted on) 62' (yellow card)
FW	17	(Colombia) John M. Pérez	(substituted on) 80'
Manager:
(Argentina) Pablo Centrone

=== Second leg ===
December 4, 1996
Second leg

Santa Fe (Colombia)	1–0	(Argentina) Lanús
Wittingham 4'	Report

Estadio El Campín, Bogotá
Attendance: 56,000
Referee: António Pereira (Brazil)

**Santa Fe**	**Lanús**

GK	1	(Venezuela) Rafael Dudamel
DF	19	(Colombia) Nelson Flórez	(substituted off) 72'
DF	21	(Colombia) Wilson Gutiérrez
DF	2	(Colombia) Orlando Garcés
DF	5	(Colombia) Óscar Upegui
MF	20	(Colombia) Jorge Salcedo
MF	17	(Colombia) Robert Villamizar	Booked
MF	7	(Colombia) Roberto Vidales	(substituted off) 46'
FW	11	(Colombia) Francisco Wittingham (c)
FW	16	(Colombia) Gustavo Díaz	(substituted off) 58'
FW	18	(Argentina) Silverio Penayo	Booked
Substitutes:
FW		(Colombia) John M. Pérez	(substituted on) 46' (yellow card)
FW	9	(Colombia) Farley Hoyos	(substituted on) 58'
FW		(Colombia) Alejandro Zea	(substituted on) 72'
Manager:
(Argentina) Pablo Centrone

GK	1	(Argentina) Carlos Roa
DF	4	(Argentina) César Loza
DF	2	(Argentina) Gustavo Falaschi
DF	6	(Argentina) Gustavo Siviero
DF	3	(Argentina) Armando González (c)
MF	20	(Argentina) Juan Fernández	(substituted off) 64'
MF	5	(Argentina) Daniel Cravero
MF	10	(Argentina) Hugo Morales	Booked
MF	7	(Argentina) Ariel Ibagaza	(substituted off) 80'
FW	19	(Argentina) Gonzalo Belloso	(substituted off) 74'
FW	11	(Argentina) Ariel M. López
Substitutes:
DF	14	(Argentina) Juan J. Serrizuela	(substituted on) 64'
FW	9	(Argentina) Claudio Enría	(substituted on) 74'
MF	21	(Argentina) Claudio Lacosegliaz	(substituted on) 80'
Manager:
(Argentina) Héctor Cúper

== See also ==
- 1996 Copa CONMEBOL
