= Cristian García =

Cristian García may refer to:

- Cristian García (footballer, born 1974), Argentine footballer
- Cristian García (Peruvian footballer) (born 1981), Peruvian footballer
- Cristian García (Spanish footballer) (born 1981), Spanish footballer
- Cristian García (footballer, born 1988), Argentine footballer
- Cristian García (footballer, born 1996), Argentine footballer

== See also ==
- Christian García (disambiguation)
