= Roberto Moreira =

Roberto Moreira may refer to:

- Roberto Moreira (footballer, born 1977), full name Roberto Moreira Rodrigues, Brazilian football midfielder
- Roberto Moreira (footballer, born 1987), full name Roberto Moreira Aldana, Paraguayan football forward

== See also ==
- Roberto
- Moreira (name)
