= Rodrigo Astudillo =

Argentine footballer (born 1977)

Personal information
- Full name: Rodrigo Daniel Astudillo
- Date of birth: 23 November 1977 (age 48)
- Place of birth: Jesús María, Córdoba, Argentina
- Height: 1.78 m (5 ft 10 in)
- Position: Forward

Youth career
- Talleres

Senior career*
Years	Team	Apps	(Gls)
1996–2001	Talleres	166	(37)
2001	Cruz Azul	13	(2)
2002	Estudiantes	5	(1)
2002–2004	San Lorenzo	28	(10)
2004	Talleres	1	(2)
2005	Alianza Lima	9	(2)
2006	Nueva Chicago	14	(5)
2006	Universidad de Chile	15	(7)
2007	América-RN	1	(0)
2008	Millonarios	5	(1)
2008	América de Cali	2	(0)
2009–2010	Colegiales	8	(0)
2011	Deportivo Colón	–	(–)
2015	Deportivo Colón	–	(–)
Total		267	(67)
- * Club domestic league appearances and goals

Rodrigo Daniel Astudillo (born 23 November 1977) is an Argentine former professional footballer who played as a forward.

Born in Jesús María, Córdoba, he played professionally in Argentina, Mexico, Peru, Chile, Brazil and Colombia. He was a member of the San Lorenzo team that won the inaugural 2002 Copa Sudamericana, finishing as the competition's joint top scorer with four goals.

== Club career ==
Astudillo began his professional career with Talleres de Córdoba, making his first-team debut on 5 October 1996. He made 173 appearances and scored 40 goals for the club, and was part of the teams that won the 1997–98 Primera B Nacional and the 1999 Copa CONMEBOL.

In 2001, he moved abroad to join Mexican club Cruz Azul. He returned to Argentina with Estudiantes de La Plata in 2002 before signing for San Lorenzo later that year.

Astudillo enjoyed one of the most successful periods of his career at San Lorenzo. He helped the club win the inaugural 2002 Copa Sudamericana under manager Rubén Darío Insúa. Astudillo scored four goals during the competition, making him San Lorenzo's leading scorer and a joint top scorer of the tournament.

In 2005, Astudillo joined Peruvian club Alianza Lima, where he also appeared in the 2005 Copa Libertadores. He returned to Argentina the following year to play for Nueva Chicago. Astudillo scored six goals during the 2006 Primera B Nacional Clausura as Chicago won the tournament and subsequently secured promotion to the Primera División.

In August 2006, Astudillo moved to Chile and signed for Universidad de Chile. At the time of his arrival, Chilean media highlighted his previous success with San Lorenzo and his experience in several foreign leagues. He quickly became one of the team's principal attacking players during the 2006 Clausura, making 15 appearances and scoring seven goals. By the quarter-finals against Cobreloa, contemporary reports identified Astudillo as Universidad de Chile's leading scorer in the tournament with seven goals.

After leaving Universidad de Chile at the end of 2006, Astudillo continued his career in Brazil with América de Natal. In 2008, he moved to Colombia, first joining Millonarios and later América de Cali. With América, Astudillo was part of the squad that won the 2008 Finalización championship.

He subsequently returned to Argentina, where he played in the lower divisions during the final stage of his career, including a spell with Colegiales.

== Personal life ==
Both his father, Eduardo, and his younger brother, Federico, were professional footballers as well. Eduardo represented Argentina in 1980.

== Honours ==
Talleres

- Copa CONMEBOL: 1999

San Lorenzo

- Copa Sudamericana: 2002
