= Hernani (footballer, born 1976) =

Brazilian footballer

Personal information
- Full name: Hernani Nogueira dos Santos
- Date of birth: 13 August 1976 (age 50)
- Place of birth: Belo Horizonte, Brazil
- Height: 1.86 m (6 ft 1 in)
- Position: Midfielder

Youth career
- –1995: Atlético Mineiro

Senior career*
Years	Team	Apps	(Gls)
1995–1999	Atlético Mineiro	121	(19)
1999	→ Portuguesa (loan)	7	(0)
2000	Grêmio	13	(0)
2000–2001	Ponte Preta		
2001–2002	Portuguesa	44	(7)
2002–2003	Ponte Preta		
2003	Goiás		
2003	Náutico		
2004	Paysandu		
2005	Ceilândia		
2005	Fortaleza		
2006–2007	Noroeste		
2007	Marília		
2008	São Caetano		
2009	Paraná		
2009	Bahia		
2010	Villa Nova		
2010–2011	Noroeste		
2011	Guarani-MG		
- * Club domestic league appearances and goals as of 17 October 2024

Hernani Nogueira dos Santos (born 13 August 1976), simply known as Hernani, is a Brazilian former professional footballer who played as a midfielder.

== Career ==
Revealed by the youth sectors of Atlético Mineiro, Hernani made history for his formative club, becoming state champion in 1995 and the 1997 CONMEBOL Cup, where he was decisive for the title. He made 121 appearances and scored 19 goals for the club. He later played for Portuguesa de Desportos, Grêmio and Ponte Preta, but with less prominence. In 2003 he was champion again, this time with Goiás. He defended Bahia in 2009 and later only defended smaller teams such as Villa Nova, Noroeste and Guarani-MG.

== Honours ==
Atlético Mineiro

- Copa CONMEBOL: 1997
- Campeonato Mineiro: 1995
- Copa Centenário de Belo Horizonte: 1997

Goiás

- Campeonato Goiano: 2003
