= Mario Cuenca =

Argentine footballer

Personal information
- Full name: Mario Eduardo Cuenca
- Date of birth: 6 March 1975 (age 51)
- Place of birth: Del Campillo, Argentina
- Height: 1.83 m (6 ft 0 in)
- Position: Goalkeeper

Senior career*
Years	Team	Apps	(Gls)
1995–2002	Talleres	222	(7)
2002–2005	Racing Club	36	(0)
2005	Talleres	0	(0)
2006	Racing Club	10	(0)
2006–2009	Arsenal de Sarandí	78	(2)
- * Club domestic league appearances and goals as of 22:42, 15 July 2009 (UTC)

Mario Eduardo Cuenca (born 6 March 1975) is an Argentine former professional footballer who played as a goalkeeper.

== Career ==
Cuenca was born in Del Campillo, Córdoba Province. He started his career with Talleres de Córdoba in 1995. He was part of the team that won the Primera B Nacional in the 1997–98 season, winning promotion to the Primera División. In 1999, he was again part of the Talleres team that won the Copa CONMEBOL, the only international title in the club's history.

In 2002 Cuenca moved to Racing Club de Avellaneda, and in 2006 he moved to Arsenal where he established himself as the first team goalkeeper. On 14 November 2007, he had a good performance against River Plate in the semi-finals of the Copa Sudamericana 2007. He made a number of saves during the game, saved two penalties in the penalty shootout and scored the winning penalty, to send Arsenal to their first ever major final.

== Honours ==
Talleres

- Primera B Nacional: 1997–98
- Copa CONMEBOL: 1999

Arsenal de Sarandí

- Copa Sudamericana: 2007
- Suruga Bank Championship: 2008
