= Gabriel Roth =

Gabriel Roth may refer to:

- Gabriel Roth (musician), American musician and producer
- Gabriel Roth (footballer) (born 1979), Argentine association football player
- Gabriel Roth (economist), writer on Transport economics
- Gabriel Roth (filmmaker) (born 1974), brother and sometime collaborator of Eli Roth

== Similar spellings ==
- Gabriele Roth (born 1967) German hurdler
- Gabrielle Roth (1941–2012), American dancer
