= Bruno Heleno =

Brazilian footballer (born 1976)

Bruno
Personal information
- Full name: Bruno Heleno Pereira da Silva
- Date of birth: 2 February 1976 (age 50)
- Place of birth: Pedro Leopoldo, Brazil
- Height: 1.75 m (5 ft 9 in)
- Position: Right back

Senior career*
Years	Team	Apps	(Gls)
1996–2002	Atlético Mineiro	260	(9)
2001	→ Internacional (loan)		
2002	Botafogo		
2003	Ituano		
2006	Ceilândia		
2006	Bahia		
2007	Brasiliense		
2007	Ceilândia		
2008	Democrata-SL		
2008–2009	América-MG	30	(0)
2010–2014	Brasília		
- * Club domestic league appearances and goals as of 30 November 2023

Bruno Heleno Pereira da Silva (born 2 February 1976), also known as Bruno Heleno or Bruno, is a Brazilian former professional footballer who played as a right back.

== Career ==
Revealed by Atlético Mineiro, Bruno was part of the winning campaign of the CONMEBOL Cup in 1997, and was Brazilian runner-up in 1999, being chosen by the Bola de Prata as the best right-back in the championship. He played for some teams outside of Minas Gerais until in 2009, being part of América champion squad in Série C. He ended his career at Brasília in 2014.

== Personal life ==
Bruno Heleno is father of the also footballer Bruninho.

== Honours ==
Atlético Mineiro

- Copa CONMEBOL: 1997
- Campeonato Mineiro: 1999, 2000

Brasiliense

- Campeonato Brasiliense: 2007

América Mineiro

- Campeonato Brasileiro Série C: 2009

Individual

- 1999 Bola de Prata
