= Darío Gigena =

Argentine footballer

Personal information
- Full name: Darío Alberto Gigena Rivero
- Date of birth: January 21, 1978 (age 48)
- Place of birth: Arroyito, Córdoba, Argentina
- Height: 1.79 m (5 ft 10 1/2 in)
- Position: Striker

Youth career
- Belgrano

Senior career*
Years	Team	Apps	(Gls)
1996–1997	Belgrano	28	(14)
1997–1998	Rayo Vallecano	9	(1)
1998–1999	Unión Santa Fe	38	(10)
1999–2000	Talleres	34	(15)
2000–2002	Colón	66	(9)
2003	Huracán	11	(1)
2003	Ponte Preta	19	(7)
2004	Colón	7	(0)
2004–2005	Racing de Córdoba	39	(11)
2005	Cortuluá	15	(5)
2006	Deportivo Pereira	16	(9)
2006–2007	Once Caldas	34	(9)
2007	Guaros FC	16	(4)
2008	Everton	14	(3)
2008–2009	Nueva Chicago	35	(16)
2009	LDU Portoviejo	12	(2)
2010	San Telmo	7	(3)
2010	Almagro	0	(0)
2010	Universitario	15	(1)
2011	Ponte Preta	2	(0)
2012	Sarmiento de Leones	9	(3)
- * Club domestic league appearances and goals

Darío Alberto Gigena Rivero (born 21 January 1978) is a former Argentine football striker.

== Career ==
Gigena played for several clubs in the Primera División Argentina and in the lower leagues of Argentine football.

Gigena also spent much of his career playing outside Argentina for Rayo Vallecano of Spain, Ponte Preta of Brazil, Cortuluá, Deportivo Pereira and Once Caldas of Colombia, Guaros FC of Venezuela, Everton of Chile, LDU Portoviejo of Ecuador and Universitario de Deportes of Peru.

== Honours ==
Talleres

- Copa Conmebol (1): 1999

Everton

- Primera División de Chile (1): 2008 Apertura
