= 1994 Campeonato Ecuatoriano de Fútbol Serie A =

Serie A
- Season: 1994
- Champions: Emelec (8th title)
- Relegated: Deportivo Cuenca; Valdez
- Copa Libertadores: Emelec; El Nacional
- Copa CONMEBOL: Barcelona
- Matches: 236
- Goals: 646 (2.74 per match)
- Top goalscorer: Manuel Uquillas (25 goals)

Campeonato Ecuatoriano de Fútbol de la Serie A was the 36th season of the Serie A, the top level of professional football in Ecuador.

== Teams ==
The number of teams for this season was played by 12 teams.

Club	City
Aucas	Quito
Barcelona	Guayaquil
Delfín	Manta
Deportivo Quito	Quito
El Nacional	Quito
Emelec	Guayaquil
ESPOLI	Quito
Green Cross	Manta
LDU Portoviejo	Portoviejo
LDU Quito	Quito
Universidad Católica	Quito
Valdez	Guayaquil

== First stage ==
Pos	Team	Pld	W	D	L	GF	GA	GD	Pts	Qualification or relegation
1	ESPOLI (Note: ESPOLI were awarded 1 points.)	22	12	7	3	41	26	+15	33	Qualified to the Liguilla Final
2	El Nacional (Note: El Nacional were awarded 0.5 points.)	22	12	6	4	39	24	+15	30.5	Qualified to the Liguilla Final
3	Emelec	22	12	4	6	37	16	+21	28	
4	Deportivo Quito	22	10	6	6	40	26	+14	26	
5	LDU Portoviejo	22	8	8	6	30	28	+2	24	
6	Aucas	22	8	6	8	29	23	+6	22	
7	Barcelona	22	7	7	8	18	24	−6	21	
8	LDU Quito	22	7	6	9	36	26	+10	20	
9	Green Cross	22	6	6	10	27	31	−4	18	
10	Delfín	22	5	6	11	16	43	−27	16	
11	Deportivo Cuenca	22	4	7	11	21	41	−20	15	
12	Valdez	22	5	3	14	23	49	−26	13	

Source: RSSSF
Rules for classification: 1) points; 2) goal difference; 3) number of goals scored.

== Second stage ==
=== Hexagonal 1 ===
Pos	Team	Pld	W	D	L	GF	GA	GD	Pts	Qualification or relegation
1	ESPOLI	12	8	2	2	22	16	+6	18	
2	Emelec	12	7	2	3	28	13	+15	16	Qualified to the Liguilla Final
3	Deportivo Quito (Note: Deportivo Quito qualified for Liguilla Final because finished higher-place on aggregate table)	12	6	4	2	24	13	+11	16	Qualified to the Liguilla Final
4	LDU Quito	12	4	2	6	26	27	−1	10	
5	LDU Portoviejo	12	3	4	5	14	22	−8	10	
6	Delfín (O)	12	3	3	6	13	24	−11	9	Definición del Descenso

Source: RSSSF
Rules for classification: 1) points; 2) goal difference; 3) number of goals scored.
(O) Play-off winners

=== Hexagonal 2 ===
Pos	Team	Pld	W	D	L	GF	GA	GD	Pts	Qualification or relegation
1	Barcelona	12	5	5	2	12	4	+8	15	Qualified to the Liguilla Final
2	Aucas	12	5	3	4	15	16	−1	13	Qualified to the Liguilla Final
3	El Nacional	12	3	5	4	19	20	−1	11	
4	Deportivo Cuenca (R)	12	4	2	6	14	24	−10	10	Definición del Descenso
5	Green Cross	12	3	3	6	16	14	+2	9	
6	Valdez (Note: Valdez were docked -1 points and also relegated to 1995 Ecuadorian Serie B after finished in last place on aggregate table) (R)	12	2	3	7	9	19	−10	6	Relegation to the Serie B

Source: RSSSF
Rules for classification: 1) points; 2) goal difference; 3) number of goals scored.
(R) Relegated

== Definición del Descenso ==
30 October 1994

Delfín	1–0	Deportivo Cuenca

6 November 1994

Deportivo Cuenca	2–1	Delfín
Penalties
	3–4

2–2 on aggregate. Delfín SC won 3–4 on penalties. Delfín SC won Definición del Descenso, while Deportivo Cuenca who relegated to the 1995 Ecuadorian Serie B

== Liguilla Final ==
Pos	Team	Pld	W	D	L	GF	GA	GD	Pts	Qualification or relegation
1	Emelec (C)	10	5	4	1	15	4	+11	14	1995 Copa Libertadores
2	El Nacional (Note: El Nacional we’re awarded 0.5 points)	10	4	5	1	13	9	+4	13.5	1995 Copa Libertadores
3	Barcelona (Note: Barcelona SC we’re awarded 1 points)	10	2	6	2	13	9	+4	11	1995 Copa CONMEBOL
4	Deportivo Quito	10	1	7	2	11	15	−4	9	
5	Aucas	10	3	2	5	10	18	−8	8	
6	ESPOLI (Note: ESPOLI we’re awarded 2 points)	10	2	2	6	11	18	−7	8	

Source: RSSSF - 1994 Serie A
(C) Champions
