= Negrini (footballer) =

Brazilian footballer (born 1967)

Personal information
- Full name: Claudiomiro Negrini
- Date of birth: 18 August 1967 (age 59)
- Place of birth: Sananduva, Brazil
- Height: 1.71 m (5 ft 7 in)
- Position: Midfielder

Senior career*
Years	Team	Apps	(Gls)
1987–1988	Esportivo		
1988	Pradense		
1989	Brasil de Farroupilha		
1990–1991	São Luiz		
1992	Atlético Paranaense		
1992–1994	Atlético Mineiro	67	(11)
1994	Bahia		
1995–1996	Pelotas		
- * Club domestic league appearances and goals as of 7 May 2024

Claudiomiro Negrini (born 18 August 1967), simply known as Negrini, is a Brazilian former professional footballer who played as a midfielder.

== Career ==
Born in Rio Grande do Sul, Negrini played most of his career for teams in the state. However, in 1992, he entered the history of Atlético Mineiro, being the best player on the field in the final match against Olimpia, when he scored two goals.

== Honours ==
Atlético Mineiro

- Copa CONMEBOL: 1992
