= Sérgio Araújo =

Brazilian footballer and farmer

Personal information
- Full name: Sérgio Araújo de Melo
- Date of birth: September 12, 1963 (age 63)
- Place of birth: Timóteo, Brazil
- Position: Winger

Senior career*
Years	Team	Apps	(Gls)
1980–1988	Atlético Mineiro		
1988–1989	Flamengo	39	(9)
1989	Fluminense		
1990	Vasco		
1991	Grêmio		
1992	Guarani		
1993	Ponte Preta		
1994	Vitória Setúbal		
1995	XV de Piracicaba		
1996–1997	América (SP)		
1998	Internacional de Limeira		
1999	Villa Nova		
2000	Serra		

International career
1987	Brazil	10	(1)

Managerial career
- 2007–2008: Operário (VG)
- * Club domestic league appearances and goals

Sérgio Araújo de Melo, usually known as Sérgio Araújo (born September 12, 1963, in Timóteo, Minas Gerais), was an association football winger.

== Playing career ==
Having been born and raised in the region of Minas Gerais it was in the famous club Atlético Mineiro that Sérgio Araújo started to show his speed and moves, scoring goals and assisting his teammates. Naturally Sérgio was picked by Brazilian manager to play for his national team, playing his first international match (a friendly) against Uruguay (March 1987). In the following month he scored his first goal for Brazil against Bolivia (2–2 was the final result). His final international match was in December 1987 against West Germany (another friendly). During this short period he played 10 international matches, playing aside well known players such as Douglas, Bebeto, Valdo, Raí, Müller and Ricardo Gomes. At Atlético Mineiro he, as well as Aílton, was part of the team that won the Conmebol Cup in 1992. Between 1988 and 1989, he played 39 games and scored nine goals for Flamengo.

In late 1993, Sérgio Araújo moved to Portuguese club Vitória Setúbal, joining a team where Yekini was the star. He played his first match against Benfica in an astonishing 5–2 win, scoring one goal in his debut. Araújo played around 20 games that season, only scoring for 3 times. Just before the 1994–1995 season, the Nigerian striker Yekini moved to Olympiacos Piraeus, and the team was severely weakened. Vitória Setúbal only won three games, and was relegated. Sérgio Araújo, due to several injuries could not be of great help to the club, and was dismissed in the end of the season. He ended his career in Brazil, returning to Minas Gerais to be a successful farm owner.

Besides having played for Atlético Mineiro, Flamengo and Vitória de Setúbal, he has also played for Fluminense, Vasco, Grêmio, Guarani, Ponte Preta, XV de Piracicaba, América (SP), Internacional de Limeira, Villa Nova, and Serra.

== Managerial career ==
After retiring, he worked for two years as Operário (VG)'s manager, leaving the club in 2008 to work as Villa Nova's youth squad manager.

== Honours ==
- Copa Conmebol 1992
