= Cristian García (footballer, born 1974) =

Argentine footballer

Personal information
- Full name: Cristian Gonzalo García
- Date of birth: 13 April 1974 (age 52)
- Place of birth: San José de La Dormida, Argentina
- Height: 1.88 m (6 ft 2 in)
- Position: Defender

Senior career*
Years	Team	Apps	(Gls)
1995–1997	Talleres		
1997–1998	Independiente	5	(0)
1998–2000	Talleres	38	(0)
2000	Toros Neza	15	(1)
2001	América de Cali	3	(0)
2001–2002	Argentinos Juniors	33	(1)
2002–2003	Nueva Chicago	34	(1)
2003–2004	Quilmes	3	(0)
2005	Talleres		
2006	Nueva Chicago	9	(0)
2006	Jorge Wilstermann	8	(0)
2007–2008	Alumni	22	(1)
2008–2009	Tiro Federal	15	(1)
Total		185	(5)
- * Club domestic league appearances and goals

Cristian Gonzalo García (born 13 April 1974) is an Argentine former professional footballer who played as a defender.

== Career ==
Talleres were García's opening senior club, he began his career with the Córdoba team in 1995 and remained for two years before moving from Primera B Nacional to the Argentine Primera División with Independiente. Five appearances followed, before he completed a return to Talleres where he went on to win the 1999 Copa CONMEBOL; beating CSA in the final over two legs. In 2000, García made a move to Mexican football by joining Toros Neza. One goal across fifteen matches followed. Categoría Primera A side América de Cali signed García ahead of the 2001 season, which they won though he played just thrice.

García went back to Argentina to have subsequent spells with Argentinos Juniors, Nueva Chicago and Quilmes in the Primera División, prior to resigning with Talleres for a third time in 2005; he took his appearance tally for them to eighty-five. In the succeeding year, García rejoined another ex-club in Nueva Chicago. 2006 saw Jorge Wilstermann of the Bolivian Primera División become García's third and final move abroad. He participated in eight matches as they won the 2006 title. Alumni and Tiro Federal were the last clubs of García's career, which saw him make a total of thirty-seven appearances and score two goals before retiring.

After retirement, García became a folklore singer and got into real estate in the Totoral Department area.

== Career statistics ==
Club statistics
Club	Season	League			Cup		Continental		Other		Total	
Club	Season	Division	Apps	Goals	Apps	Goals	Apps	Goals	Apps	Goals	Apps	Goals
Independiente	1997–98	Argentine Primera División	5	0	0	0	—		0	0	5	0
Toros Neza	2000–01	Primera División A	15	1	0	0	—		0	0	15	1
América de Cali	2001	Categoría Primera A	3	0	0	0	0	0	0	0	3	0
Argentinos Juniors	2001–02	Argentine Primera División	33	1	0	0	—		0	0	33	1
Nueva Chicago	2002–03	Argentine Primera División	34	1	0	0	—		0	0	34	1
Nueva Chicago	2005–06	Primera B Nacional	9	0	0	0	—		0	0	9	0
Nueva Chicago	Total		43	1	0	0	—		0	0	43	1
Jorge Wilstermann	2006	Bolivian Primera División	8	0	0	0	—		0	0	8	0
Alumni	2007–08	Torneo Argentino A	22	1	0	0	—		0	0	22	1
Tiro Federal	2008–09	Torneo Argentino B	15	1	0	0	—		0	0	15	1
Career total			144	5	0	0	0	0	0	0	144	5

== Honours ==
Talleres

- Copa CONMEBOL: 1999

América de Cali

- Categoría Primera A: 2001

Jorge Wilstermann

- Bolivian Primera División: 2006
