= Éder Lopes =

Brazilian footballer

Personal information
- Full name: Éder Lopes
- Date of birth: 28 August 1965 (age 61)
- Place of birth: Formiga, Brazil
- Height: 1.76 m (5 ft 9 in)
- Position: Midfielder

Youth career
- 1983–1987: Atlético Mineiro
- 1986: → Guarani-MG (loan)

Senior career*
Years	Team	Apps	(Gls)
1987–1996	Atlético Mineiro	378	(4)
1993	→ Atlético Paranaense (loan)		
1993	→ Flamengo (loan)	16	(0)
1997	Londrina		
1998	Democrata-GV		
1999	Mogi Mirim		
- * Club domestic league appearances and goals as of 27 May 2024

Éder Lopes (born 28 August 1965) is a Brazilian former professional footballer who played as a midfielder.

== Career ==
Midfielder, Éder Lopes played for Atlético Mineiro in 378 matches, taking part in winning four state titles and the 1992 Copa CONMEBOL. He also had spells at Athletico Pararaense and Flamengo, ending his career at Mogi Mirim in 1999.

== Honours ==
Atlético Mineiro

- Copa CONMEBOL: 1992
- Campeonato Mineiro: 1988, 1989, 1991, 1995
- Ramón de Carranza Trophy: 1990
