= Roberto Moreira (footballer, born 1977) =

Brazilian footballer

Roberto
Personal information
- Full name: Roberto Moreira Rodrigues
- Date of birth: 27 July 1977 (age 49)
- Place of birth: Curvelo, Brazil
- Height: 1.78 m (5 ft 10 in)
- Position: Midfielder

Youth career
- –1996: Atlético Mineiro

Senior career*
Years	Team	Apps	(Gls)
1996–1999	Atlético Mineiro	64	(1)
1999	→ Uberlândia (loan)		
1999	Juventude	19	(0)
2000	Avaí		
2001	Caxias		
2002	Villa Nova		
2002	Guarani-MG		
2003	Veranópolis		
2004	Social		
2005	Guarani-MG		
2006	Ceilândia		
- * Club domestic league appearances and goals as of 18 October 2024

Roberto Moreira Rodrigues (born 27 July 1977), better known as Roberto Moreira or simply Roberto, is a Brazilian former professional footballer who played as a midfielder.

== Career ==
Revealed by Atlético Mineiro's youth sectors, Roberto was part of the Copa CONMEBOL champion squad in 1997. He made 64 appearances for the club, scoring one goal. In 1999 he was again champion, this time of the Copa do Brasil with Juventude.

== Honours ==
Atlético Mineiro

- Copa CONMEBOL: 1997
- Copa Centenário de Belo Horizonte: 1997

Juventude

- Copa do Brasil: 1999
