= Christian García =

Christian Garcia may refer to:

- Christian Garcia (Bakersfield footballer aka BIGBELLYCHRIS) (born 2000)
- Christian García (Ecuadorian footballer) (born 2004)
- Christian Garcia (baseball) (born 1985)

== See also ==
- Cristian García (disambiguation)
