= 1995 Campeonato Ecuatoriano de Fútbol Serie A =

Serie A
- Season: 1995
- Champions: Barcelona (13th title)
- Relegated: Delfín; 9 de Octubre
- Copa Libertadores: Barcelona; ESPOLI
- Copa CONMEBOL: Emelec
- Matches: 289
- Goals: 779 (2.7 per match)
- Top goalscorer: Manuel Uquillas (24 goals)

The 1995 Campeonato Ecuatoriano de Fútbol de la Serie A was the 37th season of the Serie A, the top level of professional football in Ecuador. Barcelona won their thirteenth national championship.

== Format ==
The tournament had a three-stage system.

The first stage during the Apertura Tournament was played in a round-robin tournament, where the first four teams to qualify earned the right to fight for a place in the 1996 Copa Libertadores and also a place in the final of the national tournament. In the second stage during the Apertura Tournament, the three quadrangulars established in the second stage were played, such as the Pre-Libertadores Quadrangular (1st, 2nd, 3rd and 4th places in the standings), the B Quadrangular (5th, 7th, 9th and 11th places in the standings) and the C Quadrangular (6th, 8th, 10th and 12th places in the standings), the three quadrangulars established in this new system were played. In the first stage during the Finalisation Tournament, two hexagonals were formed, where the qualifiers for the hexagonals such as the Final Hexagonal and the Non-Relegation Hexagonal were defined.

In the second stage during the Finalisation Tournament, the two hexagonals established in the second stage were played, The first of the phase was the final hexagonal, which gave the right to fight for a place in the 1996 Copa Libertadores and also a place in the final of the national tournament, plus the team in fourth place in the standings got a place in the 1996 Copa CONMEBOL, and the team in fifth place in the standings got a place in the 1996 Pre-Conmebol, and the second of the same phase was the final hexagonal, which gave the right to fight for a place in the 1996 Copa Libertadores.

== Torneo Apertura ==
=== First stage ===
Pos	Team	Pld	W	D	L	GF	GA	GD	Pts	Qualification or relegation
1	ESPOLI	22	15	3	4	37	21	+16	48	Qualified to the Cuadrangular Pre-Libertadores
2	LDU Quito	22	14	5	3	45	16	+29	47	Qualified to the Cuadrangular Pre-Libertadores
3	Barcelona	22	12	7	3	45	15	+30	43	Qualified to the Cuadrangular Pre-Libertadores
4	Green Cross	22	13	3	6	32	23	+9	42	Qualified to the Cuadrangular Pre-Libertadores
5	Emelec	22	12	4	6	38	24	+14	40	Qualified to the Cuadrangular B
6	Aucas	22	8	8	6	29	24	+5	32	Qualified to the Cuadrangular C
7	Deportivo Quito	22	7	4	11	26	30	−4	25	Qualified to the Cuadrangular B
8	LDU Portoviejo	22	7	4	11	27	34	−7	25	Qualified to the Cuadrangular C
9	El Nacional	22	5	8	9	30	26	+4	23	Qualified to the Cuadrangular B
10	Olmedo	22	4	6	12	22	43	−21	18	Qualified to the Cuadrangular C
11	Delfín	22	5	1	16	26	67	−41	16	Qualified to the Cuadrangular B
12	9 de Octubre	22	2	2	18	17	51	−34	8	Qualified to the Cuadrangular C

Source: RSSSF
Rules for classification: 1) points; 2) goal difference; 3) number of goals scored.

=== Second Stage ===
==== Cuadrangular Pre-Libertadores ====
Pos	Team	Pld	W	D	L	GF	GA	GD	Pts	Qualification or relegation
1	Barcelona	6	5	1	0	16	2	+14	16	Qualified to the Championship final and Copa Libertadores
2	ESPOLI	6	2	1	3	6	9	−3	7	
3	Green Cross	6	2	1	3	4	13	−9	7	
4	LDU Quito	6	1	1	4	7	9	−2	4	

Source: RSSSF
Rules for classification: 1) points; 2) goal difference; 3) number of goals scored.

==== Cuadrangular B ====
Pos	Team	Pld	W	D	L	GF	GA	GD	Pts
1	El Nacional	6	4	2	0	12	1	+11	14
2	Emelec	6	3	1	2	11	7	+4	10
3	Deportivo Quito	6	0	3	3	4	10	−6	3
4	Delfín (Note: Delfín were deducted five points as pusihment for fielding a suspended player.)	6	1	2	3	2	11	−9	0

Source: RSSSF
Rules for classification: 1) points; 2) goal difference; 3) number of goals scored.

==== Cuadrangular C ====
Pos	Team	Pld	W	D	L	GF	GA	GD	Pts
1	LDU Portoviejo	6	3	2	1	10	8	+2	11
2	Olmedo	6	1	5	0	9	7	+2	8
3	Aucas	6	1	3	2	7	8	−1	6
4	9 de Octubre	6	0	4	2	6	9	−3	4

Source: RSSSF
Rules for classification: 1) points; 2) goal difference; 3) number of goals scored.

== Torneo Finalización ==
=== First stage ===
==== Group A ====
Pos	Team	Pld	W	D	L	GF	GA	GD	Pts	Qualification or relegation
1	Barcelona	10	5	3	2	18	7	+11	18	Qualified to the Championship round
2	LDU Quito	10	5	3	2	20	13	+7	18	Qualified to the Championship round
3	El Nacional	10	5	3	2	10	8	+2	18	Qualified to the Championship round
4	Green Cross	10	3	6	1	11	9	+2	15	Qualified to the Relegation round
5	Deportivo Quito	10	2	2	6	6	11	−5	8	Qualified to the Relegation round
6	Delfín	10	1	1	8	3	20	−17	4	Qualified to the Relegation round

Source: RSSSF
Rules for classification: 1) points; 2) goal difference; 3) number of goals scored.

==== Group B ====
Pos	Team	Pld	W	D	L	GF	GA	GD	Pts	Qualification or relegation
1	Aucas	10	4	5	1	22	5	+17	17	Qualified to the Championship round
2	ESPOLI	10	4	5	1	9	5	+4	17	Qualified to the Championship round
3	Emelec	10	4	4	2	17	3	+14	16	Qualified to the Championship round
4	Olmedo	10	3	5	2	9	9	0	14	Qualified to the Relegation round
5	LDU Portoviejo	10	3	3	4	16	16	0	12	Qualified to the Relegation round
6	9 de Octubre	10	0	2	8	3	38	−35	2	Qualified to the Relegation round

Source: RSSSF
Rules for classification: 1) points; 2) goal difference; 3) number of goals scored.

=== Second stage ===
==== Championship round ====
Pos	Team	Pld	W	D	L	GF	GA	GD	Pts	Qualification or relegation
1	ESPOLI	10	6	3	1	12	6	+6	21	Qualified to the Championship final and Copa Libertadores
2	Barcelona	10	5	3	2	16	8	+8	18	
3	El Nacional	10	4	3	3	12	12	0	15	
4	Emelec (Note: Emelec qualified for the Copa CONMEBOL first round as the Fase Pre-CONMEBOL winners.)	10	4	2	4	15	15	0	14	Qualified to the Fase Pre-CONMEBOL
5	LDU Quito	10	3	2	5	9	12	−3	11	Qualified to the Fase Pre-CONMEBOL
6	Aucas	10	1	1	8	6	17	−11	4	

Source: RSSSF
Rules for classification: 1) points; 2) goal difference; 3) number of goals scored.

==== Relegation round ====
Pos	Team	Pld	W	D	L	GF	GA	GD	Pts	Qualification or relegation
1	Olmedo	10	6	1	3	18	6	+12	19	
2	Green Cross	10	5	4	1	18	13	+5	19	
3	Deportivo Quito	10	5	3	2	23	8	+15	18	
4	LDU Portoviejo	9	2	3	4	15	9	+6	9	
5	9 de Octubre (R)	10	2	2	6	11	27	−16	5 (Note: 9 de Octubre were deducted three points after finished in bottom two relegation round)	Relegated to the Ecuadorian Serie B
6	Delfín (Note: The match between Liga de Portoviejo and Delfín played at the Estadio Reales Tamarindos de Portoviejo in the Clásico Manabita was not played because of the 3 penalty points as both teams would have withdrawn by mutual agreement, as the Delfín team had already been relegated to Serie B, while the Liga de Portoviejo team had been relegated a date earlier.) (R)	9	2	1	6	9	21	−12	4 (Note: Delfín were deducted three points after finished in bottom two relegation round.)	Relegated to the Ecuadorian Serie B

Source: RSSSF
Rules for classification: 1) points; 2) goal difference; 3) number of goals scored.
(R) Relegated

== Championship final ==
19 December 1995

Barcelona	2–0	ESPOLI
Gómez 38'; Yañez 73'

Estadio Monumental Isidro Romero Carbo, Guayaquil
22 December 1995

ESPOLI	0–1	Barcelona
		Pinargote 89' (o.g.)

Estadio Etho Vega, Quito

== Fase Pre-CONMEBOL ==
They faced each other between Emelec (finis hed 4th place Championship round) and LDU Quito (finished 5th place Championship round). The winner was Emelec and they qualified for the 1996 Copa CONMEBOL.

21 August 1995

Emelec	1–1	LDU Quito

Estadio George Capwell, Guayaquil
4 September 1995

LDU Quito	2–0	Emelec

Estadio Olímpico Atahualpa, Quito
