= Gonzalo Belloso =

Argentine football striker

Personal information
- Full name: Gonzalo Luis Belloso
- Date of birth: March 30, 1974 (age 52)
- Place of birth: Rosario, Argentina
- Height: 1.80 m (5 ft 11 in)
- Position: Striker

Youth career
- Rosario Central

Senior career*
Years	Team	Apps	(Gls)
1993–1995	Rosario Central	34	(5)
1995–1999	Lanús	80	(21)
1997	→ Cobreloa (loan)	22	(9)
1999–2002	RC Strasbourg	28	(4)
2001	→ Cruz Azul Hidalgo (loan)	6	(6)
2001	→ Cruz Azul (loan)	–	(–)
2002	→ Lanús (loan)	17	(7)
2002	Racing Club	8	(0)
2003	Colón	14	(1)
2003–2004	Rosario Central	28	(6)
2004–2005	Olimpia	39	(4)
2006	Zamora	1	(0)
2006–2008	Rosario Central	34	(5)
- * Club domestic league appearances and goals

Gonzalo Luis Belloso (born 30 March 1974 in Rosario) is an Argentine former football striker.

== Career ==
Belloso had three spells with Argentine clubs Lanús (where he won the 1996 Copa CONMEBOL) and Rosario Central. In Argentina, he also played for Racing Club de Avellaneda and Colón de Santa Fe.

Belloso also played for a number of clubs outside Argentina, Cobreloa in Chile, RC Strasbourg in France, Cruz Azul in Mexico, Olimpia in Paraguay and Zamora CF in Spain.

His last club was Rosario Central in the Primera Division Argentina in 2008.

== Personal life ==
His son, Matías, is a professional footballer from the Lanús youth system.

His son, Manolo, is a streamer and singer using the stage name of Lobell and a former youth player of Argentinos Juniors.
