= 1994 in Ecuadorian football =

Football in Ecuador
- Season: 1994

The 1994 season is the 72nd season of competitive football in Ecuador.

== National leagues ==
=== Serie A ===
- Champion: Emelec (7th title)
- International cup qualifiers:
  - 1995 Copa Libertadores: Emelec, El Nacional
  - 1995 Copa CONMEBOL: Barcelona, Deportivo Quito
- Relegated: Deportivo Cuenca, Valdez

=== Serie B ===
- Winner: Olmedo (1st title)
- Promoted: Olmedo, 9 de Octubre
- Relegated: 2 de Marzo, Santos

=== Segunda ===
- Winner: Deportivo Quevedo (1st title)
- Promoted: Deportivo Quevedo, Flamengo

== Clubs in international competitions ==
Team	1994 Copa Libertadores	1994 Copa CONMEBOL
Barcelona	Eliminated in the Round of 16	N/A
Emelec	Eliminated in the Round of 16	N/A
El Nacional	N/A	Eliminated in the First Round

== National teams ==
=== Senior team ===
The Ecuador national team played four friendlies in 1994. Ecuadorian Carlos Torres Garcés assumed management of the national team following the resignation of Montenegrin Dušan Drašković. After two matches, Garcés resigned and was succeeded by Carlos Rón.

25 May 1994

Ecuador	1 – 0	Argentina
B. Tenorio 5'

Estadio Monumental Isidro Romero Carbo, Guayaquil
Attendance: 45,000
Referee: Jorge Orellana (Ecuador)

5 June 1994

Ecuador	2 – 1	South Korea
Vernaza 34'; Rón 77'		Myung-Bo 60' (pen.)

Wakefield High School Field, Wakefield, Massachusetts
Attendance: 3,000
Referee: Edwin Resendes (United States)

17 August 1994

Peru	2 – 0	Ecuador
Palacios; Sáenz

Estadio Nacional, Lima
Attendance: 3,000
Referee: Luis Ángel Seminario (Peru)

21 September 1994

Ecuador	0 – 0	Peru

Estadio 9 de Mayo, Machala
Attendance: 3,000
Referee: Jorge Orellana (Ecuador)
