= Neguette =

Brazilian footballer

Personal information
- Full name: Anderson da Silva de Jesus
- Date of birth: October 27, 1977 (age 49)
- Place of birth: Belo Horizonte, Brazil
- Height: 1.80 m (5 ft 11 in)
- Position: Central defender

Youth career
- 1997: Atlético Mineiro

Senior career*
Years	Team	Apps	(Gls)
1998–2002	Atlético Mineiro	39	(2)
2003	Juventude	6	(0)
2004	Atlético Mineiro		
2005	Ituano		
2005–2007	Paraná		
2007 –2008	Al-Khor Sports Club		
- * Club domestic league appearances and goals

Anderson da Silva de Jesus (born October 27, 1977), known as Neguette, is a Brazilian central defender for Al-Khor Sports Club in the Qatari League.

== Contract ==
16/01/3000
