= Ricardo Silva (Argentine footballer) =

Argentine footballer (born 1977)

Personal information
- Full name: Ricardo Adrián Silva
- Date of birth: 27 March 1977 (age 49)
- Place of birth: Avellaneda, Argentina
- Height: 1.69 m (5 ft 7 in)
- Position: Midfielder

Senior career*
Years	Team	Apps	(Gls)
1996–1999	Defensa y Justicia		
1999–2000	Talleres		
2000–2001	CD Badajoz		
2001	Defensa y Justicia		
2001–2002	Los Andes		
2003–2003	Instituto		
2003	Juventud Antoniana		
2004–2006	Perak FA		
2006–2008	Bontang FC		
- * Club domestic league appearances and goals as of 22:08, 6 August 2011 (UTC)

Ricardo Adrián Silva (born 27 March 1977) is an Argentine former footballer who played as a midfielder.
