= Miguel Sanabria =

Paraguayan footballer (born 1964)

Personal information
- Full name: Miguel Ángel Sanabria
- Date of birth: November 11, 1964 (age 61)
- Place of birth: Luque, Paraguay
- Position: Midfielder

Senior career*
Years	Team	Apps	(Gls)
1985–1990	Cerro Porteño		
1991	Bolívar		
1991–1996	Olimpia		
1997	Nacional	3	(0)
1997	Unión Española	6	(1)

International career
1991	Paraguay	3	(0)

Managerial career
- 2010: La Paz FC
- * Club domestic league appearances and goals

Miguel Ángel Sanabria (born November 11, 1964) is a retired football (soccer) midfielder from Paraguay. He played professional football for clubs like Club Olimpia in Paraguay, and also had a spell in Bolivia, playing for Club Bolívar.

== Teams ==
- (Paraguay) Cerro Porteño 1985–1990
- (Bolivia) Bolívar 1991
- (Paraguay) Olimpia 1991–1996
- (Uruguay) Nacional 1997
- (Chile) Unión Española 1997

== International career ==
Sanabria made his international debut for the Paraguay national football team on July 10, 1991 in a Copa América match against Venezuela (5-0 win), substituting Felipe Peralta in the 76th minute. He obtained a total number of three international caps, scoring no goals for the national side.
