= Mariano Fernández (footballer, born 1978) =

Argentine footballer

Personal information
- Full name: Mariano Antonio Fernández Farina
- Date of birth: 2 September 1978 (age 48)
- Place of birth: Lanús, Argentina
- Height: 1.86 m (6 ft 1 in)
- Position: Defender

Senior career*
| Years | Team | Apps | (Gls) |
| 1997–2001 | Lanús | 65 | (5) |
| 2000 | → Belgrano (loan) | 12 | (0) |
| 2001–2002 | Sturm Graz | 19 | (0) |
| 2002–2003 | Beira-Mar | 31 | (0) |
| 2003–2004 | Torino | 28 | (1) |
| 2004–2005 | Real Murcia | 6 | (1) |
| 2005–2006 | Córdoba | 15 | (1) |
| 2006–2007 | Nueva Chicago | 8 | (0) |
| 2007–2008 | Dinamo Bucharest | 2 | (0) |
| 2008 | Cisco Roma | 11 | (1) |
| 2008–2009 | Gela | 23 | (0) |
| 2009–2010 | Sorrento | 28 | (4) |
| 2010–2011 | Casale | 12 | (0) |
| 2011 | → Cosenza (loan) | 13 | (0) |
| 2011–2012 | Siracusa | 23 | (1) |
| 2012–2013 | Paganese | 23 | (3) |
| 2013–2014 | Matera | 26 | (1) |
| Total | | 345 | (18) |
- * Club domestic league appearances and goals

Mariano Antonio Fernández Farina (born 2 September 1978) is an Argentine former professional footballer who played as a defender. He spent over 10 seasons in European Union nations, especially in Italian lower divisions. Fernández also holds Spanish nationality.

== Career ==
Born in Lanús, within the Greater Buenos Aires, Fernández started his professional career at Club Atlético Lanús. Since 2001–02 season he left Argentina for Europe, firstly for Austrian club Sturm Graz. In 2002–03 season he played for Primeira Liga club Beira-Mar. In 2003, he signed for Italian Serie B club Torino Calcio, but on loan from Fénix, believed to be a proxy for the third parties owner. In 2004–05 season he signed for Segunda División club Real Murcia. However, he only played six games. In 2005–06 season he joined Segunda División B club Córdoba.

Fernández returned to Argentina for Nueva Chicago. He only played eight games in 2006–07 Argentine Primera División, all in the first half of the season (Apertura 2006). He signed for Romanian Liga I club Dinamo Bucharest in 2007–08 Liga I but again only played a handful games, with four more games for Dinamo II. Fernández also played as an unused bench in 2007–08 UEFA Cup First Round.

=== Italian Lega Pro ===
In January 2008 Fernández returned to Italy and spent rest of his career in Italian third and fourth division (Lega Pro). At first he signed for Cisco Roma, then with Gela in 2008–09 season.

In July 2009 he signed for Sorrento. In August 2010 he left for Casale. In January 2011 he signed for Cosenza but the club bankrupted at the end of season.

On 31 August 2011, he signed for third division club Siracusa to replace Giovanni Iodice who moved to Casale Monferrato.
