= Leonardo Mas =

Argentine footballer

Personal information
- Full name: Leonardo Óscar Mas
- Date of birth: 25 July 1975 (age 51)
- Place of birth: Buenos Aires, Argentina
- Height: 1.69 m (5 ft 7 in)
- Position: Midfielder

Youth career
- Argentinos Juniors

Senior career*
Years	Team	Apps	(Gls)
1993–1997	Argentinos Juniors	83	(2)
1997–1999	Lanús	31	(5)
1999–2001	Estudiantes LP	68	(2)
2001–2002	Chacarita Juniors	32	(3)
2002–2004	Olimpo	40	(2)
2003	→ Cuenca (loan)	15	(2)
2004	Defensores de Belgrano	13	(2)
2005–2007	Huachipato	101	(7)
2008	Universidad de Chile	19	(1)
2009–2010	Municipal Iquique	19	(1)
- * Club domestic league appearances and goals as of 3 September 2018

Leonardo Óscar Mas (born July 25, 1975) is a retired Argentine footballer.

He came through the youth system of Argentinos Juniors until 1993 when he made his professional debut. Mas has played most of his career in Argentina. He did play six months in Ecuador. In 2005, he made the move to Chilean club Huachipato, where he played very well. Because of his good form, in 2008 one of Chile's biggest club, Universidad de Chile, signed Mas.

== Honours ==
=== Club ===
Deportes Iquique

- Copa Chile (1): 2010
- Primera B (1): 2010
