= Justo Javier Meza =

Paraguayan footballer (born 1967)

Justo Javier Meza Ovelar (born July 19, 1967) is a Paraguayan former professional footballer who played as a midfielder for clubs of Paraguay and Chile.

== Career ==
- Olimpia 1989–1990
- Sol de América 1991
- Cerro Porteño 1992–1998
- Deportes Puerto Montt 1999
- Santiago Wanderers 2000
- Sol de América 2001–2002

== Honours ==
Olimpia

- Paraguayan Primera División: 1989
- Copa Libertadores: 1990
- Supercopa Libertadores: 1990

Sol de América

- Paraguayan Primera División: 1991

Cerro Porteño

- Paraguayan Primera División: 1992, 1994, 1996
