= Ryuler =

Brazilian footballer

Personal information
- Full name: Ryuler José Pereira Neves
- Date of birth: 11 January 1969 (age 57)
- Place of birth: Caxambu, Brazil
- Height: 1.83 m (6 ft 0 in)
- Position: Defender

Senior career*
| Years | Team | Apps | (Gls) |
| 1988–1989 | Caldense | | |
| 1990–1992 | Atlético Mineiro | | |
| 1993–1997 | Rio Branco | | |
| 1997–1998 | Leça | | |
- * Club domestic league appearances and goals

Ryuler José Pereira Neves (born 11 January 1969), known as just Ryuler, is a retired Brazilian football defender.
