= Juan Fernández Di Alessio =

Argentine footballer

Personal information
- Full name: Juan Ignacio Fernández Di Alessio
- Date of birth: 9 September 1975 (age 51)
- Place of birth: Buenos Aires, Argentina
- Height: 1.71 m (5 ft 7 in)
- Position: Midfielder

Youth career
- 1995–1996: Argentinos Juniors

Senior career*
Years	Team	Apps	(Gls)
1996–2002	Lanús	150	(10)
2002–2003	Club Olimpo	34	(1)
2003–2004	Arsenal de Sarandí	38	(2)
2004	Instituto de Córdoba	18	(0)
2005	Cerro Porteño	26	(0)
2006	Huracán	22	(0)
2006–2007	Quilmes	12	(1)
2007	Sportivo Luqueño	1	(0)
Total		301	(14)
- * Club domestic league appearances and goals

Juan Ignacio Fernández Di Alessio (born 9 September 1975) is an Argentine former professional footballer who played as a midfielder for clubs in Argentina and Paraguay.

== Career ==
- Asociación Atletica Argentinos Juniors 1995–1996
- Lanús 1996–2002
- Olimpo de Bahía Blanca 2002–2003
- Arsenal de Sarandí 2003–2004
- Instituto de Córdoba 2004
- Cerro Porteño 2005
- Huracán 2006
- Quilmes 2006–2007
- Sportivo Luqueño 2007
