= Missinho =

Brazilian footballer

Personal information
- Full name: Edmílson do Nascimento Trigueiro
- Date of birth: 24 February 1975
- Place of birth: João Pessoa, Brazil
- Date of death: 26 August 2014 (aged 39)
- Place of death: Cabedelo, Brazil
- Height: 1.80 m (5 ft 11 in)
- Position: Forward

Senior career*
Years	Team	Apps	(Gls)
1992–1993	Nacional de Cabedelo		
1994	Botafogo-PB		
1995–1996	Cruzeiro		
1996	Guará		
1997	América Mineiro		
1998	Cruzeiro		
1999	CSA		
2000	Avaí		
2001	15 de Novembro		
2002	CRB		
2003	Botafogo-PB		
2003	América de Caaporã-PB		
2004	Sampaio Corrêa		
2004	Miramar		
2005	Nacional de Patos		
2005	Nacional-SP		
2006	Auto Esporte-PB		
2007	Botafogo-PB		
2008–2009	Internacional-PB		
2009	Cruzeiro-PB		
2010–2011	Miramar		
- * Club domestic league appearances and goals as of 30 November 2023

Edmílson do Nascimento Trigueiro (24 February 1975 – 26 August 2014), better known as Missinho, was a Brazilian professional footballer who played as a forward.

== Career ==
A successful striker in Paraíba football, Missinho also played for Cruzeiro EC, CR Guará, where he became Federal District champion, and CSA, being top scorer in the runner-up campaign of the 1999 CONMEBOL Cup. He played until the beginning of the 2010s, playing by Miramar EC.

== Honours ==
Guará

- Campeonato Brasiliense: 1996

Botafogo-PB

- Campeonato Paraibano: 2003

Individual

- 1999 Copa CONMEBOL top scorer: 4 goals

== Death ==
Missinho died in 2014, at the age of 39, from esophageal cancer.
