= Gabriel Roth (footballer) =

Argentine footballer

Personal information
- Full name: Gabriel Fernando Roth
- Date of birth: 5 May 1979 (age 47)
- Place of birth: Venado Tuerto, Argentina
- Height: 1.79 m (5 ft 10 in)
- Position: Midfielder

Senior career*
| Years | Team | Apps | (Gls) |
| 1999–2003 | Talleres | 55 | (7) |
| 2000–2002 | → Córdoba (loan) | 0 | (0) |
| 2003–2006 | Gimnasia de Jujuy | 5 | (0) |
| 2006–2007 | San Martín SJ | 13 | (1) |
| 2008 | Atlético Bucaramanga | 4 | (0) |
| 2008–2009 | Independiente Rivadavia | 26 | (2) |
| 2010–2011 | Patronato | 19 | (5) |
| 2011 | Rangers | 12 | (0) |
| 2012 | Tiro Federal | 8 | (0) |
| 2012 | Sportivo Del Bono | 10 | (1) |
| 2013 | Defensores de Belgrano VR | 8 | (0) |
| 2013–2014 | Estudiantes SL | 6 | (0) |
- * Club domestic league appearances and goals

Gabriel Fernando Roth (born 5 May 1979 in Venado Tuerto, Santa Fe) is an Argentine former footballer who played as a midfielder.

== Club career ==
A product of Talleres de Córdoba, Roth made his professional debut under Ricardo Gareca.

Abroad, Roth had stints with Córdoba CF in Spain, on loan from Talleres, Atlético Bucaramanga in Colombia and Rangers de Talca in Chile.

In his last years as a footballer, Roth played in his homeland for Tiro Federal, Sportivo Del Bono, Defensores de Belgrano de Villa Ramallo and Estudiantes de San Luis.

== Coaching career ==
Roth has served as coach for youth players from club Pringles.
