= 1996 Copa CONMEBOL =

Tournament details
- Teams: 16 (from 10 confederations)

Final positions
- Champions: (Argentina) Lanús (1st title)
- Runners-up: (Colombia) Santa Fe

Tournament statistics
- Matches played: 30
- Top scorer: (Argentina) Oscar Mena (5)

The 1996 Copa CONMEBOL was the fifth edition of CONMEBOL's annual club tournament. Teams that failed to qualify for the Copa Libertadores played in this tournament. Sixteen teams from the ten South American football confederations qualified for this tournament. Lanús defeated Santa Fe in the finals.

== Qualified teams ==
The following 16 teams from 10 CONMEBOL member associations qualified for the tournament.

- 1995 Copa CONMEBOL champions
- Brazil: 4 berths
- Colombia, Uruguay: 2 berths
- All other associations: 1 berth each

Association	Team (Berth)	Qualification method
Argentina; 1 berth + reigning champion	Rosario Central	1995 Copa CONMEBOL champion
Argentina; 1 berth + reigning champion	Lanús	1995–96 Argentine Primera División best placed team not participating in either the 1996 Supercopa Sudamericana or 1997 Copa Libertadores
Bolivia; 1 berth	Bolívar	1995 Liga de Fútbol Profesional Boliviano 3rd place
Brazil; 4 berths	Fluminense	1995 Campeonato Brasileiro Série A best placed team not qualified for 1996 Copa Libertadores or 1996 Supercopa Libertadores
Brazil; 4 berths	Palmeiras	1995 Campeonato Brasileiro Série A 2nd best placed team not qualified for 1996 Copa Libertadores or 1996 Supercopa Libertadores
Brazil; 4 berths	Bragantino	1995 Campeonato Brasileiro Série A 3rd best placed team not qualified for 1996 Copa Libertadores or 1996 Supercopa Libertadores
Brazil; 4 berths	Vasco da Gama	1995 Copa do Brasil best placed team not qualified for 1996 Copa Libertadores or 1996 Supercopa Libertadores
Chile; 1 berth	Cobreloa	1996 Liguilla Pre-CONMEBOL winner
Colombia; 2 berths	Deportes Tolima	1995–96 Categoría Primera A 4th place
Colombia; 2 berths	Santa Fe	1995–96 Categoría Primera A Liguilla Pre-CONMEBOL winner
Ecuador; 1 berth	Emelec	1995 Campeonato Ecuatoriano de Fútbol Serie A winner of the Pre-CONMEBOL phase
Paraguay; 1 berth	Guaraní	1996 Paraguayan Primera División Torneo Apertura winner
Peru; 1 berth	Alianza Lima	1995 Torneo Descentralizado 3rd place
Uruguay; 2 berths	River Plate	1995 Campeonato Uruguayo Primera División Liguilla Pre-Libertadores 5th place
Uruguay; 2 berths	Porongos	1995 Campeonato Uruguayo Primera División Liguilla Pre-Libertadores 6th place
Venezuela; 1 berth	Unión Atlético Táchira	1995–96 Venezuelan Primera División 4th place

== Bracket ==
First round
(Argentina) Lanús	4	0	4
(Bolivia) Bolívar	1	1	2
(Brazil) Fluminense	1	2	3
(Paraguay) Guaraní	3	2	5
(Argentina) Rosario Central	2	4	6
(Chile) Cobreloa	3	1	4
(Uruguay) River Plate	2	6	8
(Uruguay) Porongos	2	0	2
(Colombia) Deportes Tolima	1	0	1
(Brazil) Vasco da Gama	0	4	4
(Ecuador) Emelec	1	2	3 (4)
(Peru) Alianza Lima	2	1	3 (3)
(Brazil) Palmeiras	1	3	4
(Brazil) Bragantino	5	0	5
(Colombia) Santa Fe	2	3	5
(Venezuela) Unión Atlético Táchira	2	0	2

Quarterfinals
(Argentina) Lanús	2	6	8
(Paraguay) Guaraní	0	2	2
(Argentina) Rosario Central	4	0	4
(Uruguay) River Plate	0	0	0
(Brazil) Vasco da Gama	2	0	2
(Ecuador) Emelec	0	1	1
(Brazil) Bragantino	0	0	0
(Colombia) Santa Fe	1	0	1

Semifinals
(Argentina) Lanús	3	3	6
(Argentina) Rosario Central	0	1	1
(Brazil) Vasco da Gama	2	0	2 (5)
(Colombia) Santa Fe	1	1	2 (6)

Finals
(Argentina) Lanús	2	0	2
(Colombia) Santa Fe	0	1	1

== First round ==
Team 1	Agg.	Team 2	1st leg	2nd leg
Lanús (Argentina)	4–2	(Bolivia) Bolívar	4–1	0–1
Fluminense (Brazil)	3–5	(Paraguay) Guaraní	1–3	2–2
Rosario Central (Argentina)	6–4	(Chile) Cobreloa	2–3	4–1
River Plate (Uruguay)	8–2	(Uruguay) Porongos	2–2	6–0
Vasco da Gama (Brazil)	4–1	(Colombia) Deportes Tolima	0–1	4–0
Emelec (Ecuador)	3–3 (4–3 p)	(Peru) Alianza Lima	1–2	2–1
Bragantino (Brazil)	5–4	(Brazil) Palmeiras	5–1	0–3
Unión Atlético Táchira (Venezuela)	2–5	(Colombia) Santa Fe	2–2	0–3

== Quarterfinals ==
Team 1	Agg.	Team 2	1st leg	2nd leg
Lanús (Argentina)	8–2	(Paraguay) Guaraní	2–0	6–2
Rosario Central (Argentina)	4–0	(Uruguay) River Plate	4–0	0–0
Vasco da Gama (Brazil)	2–1	(Ecuador) Emelec	2–0	0–1
Bragantino (Brazil)	0–1	(Colombia) Santa Fe	0–1	0–0

== Semifinals ==
Team 1	Agg.	Team 2	1st leg	2nd leg
Lanús (Argentina)	6–1	(Argentina) Rosario Central	3–1	3–0
Vasco da Gama (Brazil)	2–2 (5–6 p)	(Colombia) Santa Fe	2–1	0–1

== Finals ==
Team 1	Agg.	Team 2	1st leg	2nd leg
Lanús (Argentina)	2–1	(Colombia) Santa Fe	2–0	0–1
