= Copa CONMEBOL =

- Organizer(s): CONMEBOL
- Founded: 1992
- Abolished: 1999; 27 years ago
- Region: South America
- Teams: 16
- Related competitions: Copa Mercosur; Copa Merconorte; Copa Sudamericana
- Most championships: (Brazil) Atlético Mineiro (2 titles)

The Copa CONMEBOL (Spanish pronunciation: [ˈkopa konmeˈbol], Portuguese pronunciation: [ˈkɔ.pɐ kõ.mɛˈbɔw], both meaning CONMEBOL Cup) was an annual football cup competition organized by CONMEBOL between 1992 and 1999 for South American football clubs. During its time of existence, it was a very prestigious South American club football contest, similar to the UEFA Cup. Clubs qualified for the competition based on their performance in their national leagues and cup competitions. Teams that were not able to qualify for the Copa Libertadores would play in this tournament. The tournament was played as a knockout cup. The tournament ended in 1999, following the expansion of the Copa Libertadores to 32 teams.

The Copa Mercosur and Copa Merconorte - which both started in 1998 - replaced the Copa CONMEBOL, and the merger of those 3 cups would later transformed in the current Copa Sudamericana.

The last champion of the competition was Talleres, while Atlético Mineiro is the most successful club in the cup history, having won the tournament two times. The cup was won by seven different clubs but it was never won consecutively.

== Format ==
=== Qualification ===
Each national association was assigned a number of entries determined by CONMEBOL which changed slightly from one edition to another. The best teams from the previous season that did not qualify for the Copa Libertadores through their league qualified for the Copa CONMEBOL. The tournament itself was played in two-legged knockout stages. The champion of the Copa CONMEBOL disputed the Recopa Sudamericana, the Copa de Oro and the Copa Master de CONMEBOL, albeit irregularly.

=== Tournament ===
The tournament started in the first stage in which 16 clubs were paired in a series of two-legged knockout ties in the round of 16, the first of four stages that worked on a single elimination phase knockout system that culminated in the finals. During each stage of the tournament, ties were decided on points, followed by goal difference, away goals, then a penalty shootout after full-time of the second leg, if necessary.

== Records and statistics ==
=== List of finals ===
Keys
- aet: after extra time
- p: defined on penalty shoot-out
- Match decided by a penalty shootout after extra time
- Match playoff after the series ended tied on aggregate
- Defined on penalty shoot-out in the second leg

Ed.	Year	Winners	1st. leg	2nd. leg	Playoff/ Agg.	Runners-up	Venue (1st leg)	City (1st leg)	Venue (2nd leg)	City (2nd leg)	Ref.
1	1992	(Brazil) Atlético Mineiro	2–0	0–1	–	(Paraguay) Olimpia	Mineirão	Belo Horizonte	Estadio Manuel Ferreira	Asunción	
2	1993	(Brazil) Botafogo	1–1	2–2	3–1 (p)	(Uruguay) Peñarol	Centenario	Montevideo	Maracanã	Rio de Janeiro	
3	1994	(Brazil) São Paulo	6–1	0–3	–	(Uruguay) Peñarol	Morumbi	São Paulo	Centenario	Montevideo	
4	1995	(Argentina) Rosario Central	0–4	4–0	4–3 (p)	(Brazil) Atlético Mineiro	Mineirão	Belo Horizonte	Gigante de Arroyito	Rosario	
5	1996	(Argentina) Lanús	2–0	0–1	–	(Colombia) Santa Fe	La Fortaleza	Lanús	El Campín	Bogotá	
6	1997	(Brazil) Atlético Mineiro	4–1	1–1	–	(Argentina) Lanús	La Fortaleza	Lanús	Mineirão	Belo Horizonte	
7	1998	(Brazil) Santos	1–0	0–0	–	(Argentina) Rosario Central	Vila Belmiro	Santos	Gigante de Arroyito	Rosario	
8	1999	(Argentina) Talleres (C)	2–4	3–0	–	(Brazil) CSA	Rei Pelé	Maceió	Olímpico	Córdoba	

=== Performances by club ===
The trophy which was awarded to the champions of the competition

Performance in the Copa CONMEBOL by club
Club	Titles	Runners-up	Seasons won	Seasons runner-up
(Brazil) Atlético Mineiro	2	1	1992, 1997	1995
(Argentina) Rosario Central	1	1	1995	1998
(Argentina) Lanús	1	1	1996	1997
(Brazil) Botafogo	1	0	1993	—
(Brazil) São Paulo	1	0	1994	—
(Brazil) Santos	1	0	1998	—
(Argentina) Talleres	1	0	1999	—
(Uruguay) Peñarol	0	2	—	1993, 1994
(Paraguay) Olimpia	0	1	—	1992
(Colombia) Santa Fe	0	1	—	1996
(Brazil) CSA	0	1	—	1999

=== Performances by nation ===
Nation	Winner	Runner-up	Total
Brazil	5	2	7
Argentina	3	2	5
Uruguay	0	2	2
Colombia	0	1	1
Paraguay	0	1	1

== Top scorers ==
Year	Player (team)	Goals
1992	(Brazil) Aílton Delfino (Atlético Mineiro)	6
1993	(Brazil) Sinval (Botafogo)	8
1994	(Brazil) Juninho (São Paulo) (Uruguay) Martín Rodríguez Alba (Peñarol) (Brazil) Tupãzinho (Corinthians)	5
1995	(Argentina) Horacio Carbonari (Rosario Central) (Uruguay) Rubén da Silva (Rosario Central) (Colombia) Álex Escobar (América de Cali)	4
1996	(Argentina) Oscar Mena (Lanús)	5
1997	(Brazil) Valdir (Atlético Mineiro)	7
1998	(Uruguay) Carlos María Morales (LDU Quito) (Brazil) Viola (Santos)	4
1999	(Brazil) Marcelo Araxá (São Raimundo-AM) (Brazil) Missinho (CSA)	4

== See also ==
- Copa Sudamericana
- Copa Mercosur
- Copa Merconorte
- Copa Interamericana
- Copa Libertadores
- Copa Master de CONMEBOL
