= 1995 Copa CONMEBOL =

Tournament details
- Teams: 16 (from 10 confederations)

Final positions
- Champions: (Argentina) Rosario Central (1st title)
- Runners-up: (Brazil) Atlético Mineiro

Tournament statistics
- Matches played: 30
- Top scorer(s): (Uruguay) Rubén da Silva (Argentina) Horacio Carbonari (Colombia) Alexander Escobar (4 goals each)

The 1995 Copa CONMEBOL was the fourth edition of CONMEBOL's annual club tournament. Teams that failed to qualify for the Copa Libertadores within their respective leagues played in this tournament. Sixteen teams from the ten South American football confederations qualified for this tournament. Rosario Central defeated Atlético Mineiro in the finals.

== Qualified teams ==
The following 16 teams from 10 CONMEBOL member associations qualified for the tournament.

- Brazil: 4 berths
- Argentina, Colombia, Uruguay: 2 berths
- All other associations: 1 berth each

Association	Team (Berth)	Qualification method
Argentina; 2 berths	Gimnasia y Esgrima	1994–95 Argentine Primera División best team not participating in either the 1995 Supercopa Sudamericana or 1996 Copa Libertadores
Argentina; 2 berths	Rosario Central	1994–95 Argentine Primera División 2nd best team not participating in either the 1995 Supercopa Sudamericana or 1996 Copa Libertadores
Bolivia; 1 berth	The Strongest	1994 Liga de Fútbol Profesional Boliviano 3rd place
Brazil; 4 berths	Corinthians	1994 Campeonato Brasileiro Série A runners-up
Brazil; 4 berths	Guarani	1994 Campeonato Brasileiro Série A 3rd place
Brazil; 4 berths	Atlético Mineiro	1994 Campeonato Brasileiro Série A 4th place
Brazil; 4 berths	Ceará	1994 Copa do Brasil runners-up
Chile; 1 berth	Cobreloa	1994 Liguilla Pre-Libertadores 2nd place
Colombia; 2 berths	América de Cali	1994 Categoría Primera A 3rd place
Colombia; 2 berths	Independiente Medellín	1994 Categoría Primera A 4th place
Ecuador; 1 berth	Barcelona	1994 Campeonato Ecuatoriano de Fútbol Serie A 3rd place of the Liguilla Final
Paraguay; 1 berth	Colegiales	1994 Paraguayan Primera División First Stage 4th place
Peru; 1 berth	Ciclista Lima	1994 Torneo Descentralizado Torneo Apertura 2nd place
Uruguay; 2 berths	Defensor Sporting	1994 Campeonato Uruguayo Primera División Liguilla Pre-Libertadores 3rd place
Uruguay; 2 berths	Sud América	1994 Campeonato Uruguayo Primera División Liguilla Pre-Libertadores 4th place
Venezuela; 1 berth	Mineros de Guayana	Winner of the tie between the 4th and 5th place in the 1994–95 Venezuelan Primera División

== Bracket ==
First round
(Brazil) Ceará	1	2	3 (6)
(Brazil) Corinthians	1	2	3 (7)
(Colombia) América de Cali	3	2	5
(Ecuador) Barcelona	1	0	1
(Brazil) Atlético Mineiro	1	1	2
(Brazil) Guarani	1	0	1
(Venezuela) Mineros de Guayana	1	2	3 (4)
(Colombia) Independiente Medellín	0	3	3 (3)
(Argentina) Gimnasia y Esgrima	1	0	1
(Uruguay) Sud América	0	4	4
(Bolivia) The Strongest	0	1	1
(Paraguay) Colegiales	0	2	2
(Peru) Ciclista Lima	4	2	6
(Chile) Cobreloa	1	7	8
(Uruguay) Defensor Sporting	1	1	2
(Argentina) Rosario Central	3	2	5

Quarterfinals
(Brazil) Corinthians	2	1	3
(Colombia) América	1	3	4
(Brazil) Atlético Mineiro	6	4	10
(Venezuela) Mineros de Guayana	0	0	0
(Uruguay) Sud América	0	2	2 (3)
(Paraguay) Colegiales	1	1	2 (4)
(Chile) Cobreloa	0	1	1
(Argentina) Rosario Central	2	3	5

Semifinals
(Colombia) América	4	0	4 (3)
(Brazil) Atlético Mineiro	3	1	4 (4)
(Paraguay) Colegiales	0	1	1
(Argentina) Rosario Central	2	3	5

Finals
(Brazil) Atlético Mineiro	4	0	4 (3)
(Argentina) Rosario Central	0	4	4 (4)

== First round ==
Team 1	Agg.	Team 2	1st leg	2nd leg
Corinthians (Brazil)	3–3 (7–6 p)	(Brazil) Ceará	1–1	2–2
Barcelona (Ecuador)	1–5	(Colombia) América de Cali	1–3	0–2
Atlético Mineiro (Brazil)	2–1	(Brazil) Guarani	1–1	1–0
Mineros de Guayana (Venezuela)	3–3 (4–3 p)	(Colombia) Independiente Medellín	1–0	2–3
Gimnasia y Esgrima (Argentina)	1–4	(Uruguay) Sud América	1–0	0–4
Colegiales (Paraguay)	2–1	(Bolivia) The Strongest	0–0	2–1
Cobreloa (Chile)	8–6	(Peru) Ciclista Lima	1–4	7–2
Defensor Sporting (Uruguay)	2–5	(Argentina) Rosario Central	1–3	1–2

== Quarterfinals ==
Team 1	Agg.	Team 2	1st leg	2nd leg
Corinthians (Brazil)	3–4	(Colombia) América de Cali	2–1	1–3
Atlético Mineiro (Brazil)	10–0	(Venezuela) Mineros de Guayana	6–0	4–0
Colegiales (Paraguay)	2–2 (4–3 p)	(Uruguay) Sud América	1–0	1–2
Cobreloa (Chile)	1–5	(Argentina) Rosario Central	0–2	1–3

== Semifinals ==
Team 1	Agg.	Team 2	1st leg	2nd leg
Atlético Mineiro (Brazil)	4–4 (4–3 p)	(Colombia) América de Cali	3–4	1–0
Colegiales (Paraguay)	1–5	(Argentina) Rosario Central	0–2	1–3

== Finals ==
Team 1	Agg.	Team 2	1st leg	2nd leg
Rosario Central (Argentina)	4–4 (4–3 p)	(Brazil) Atlético Mineiro	0–4	4–0
