= 1997 Copa CONMEBOL =

Tournament details
- Teams: 18 (from 10 confederations)

Final positions
- Champions: (Brazil) Atlético Mineiro (2nd title)
- Runners-up: (Argentina) Lanús

Tournament statistics
- Matches played: 34
- Top scorer: (Brazil) Valdir (7)

The 1997 Copa CONMEBOL was the sixth edition of CONMEBOL's annual club tournament. Teams that failed to qualify for the Copa Libertadores played in this tournament. Eighteen teams from the ten South American football confederations qualified for this tournament. A preliminary round was played to narrow the teams down to sixteen for the first round. Atlético Mineiro defeated the defending champion Lanús in the finals.

== Qualified teams ==
Qualified teams
(Argentina) Colón	(Venezuela) Estudiantes de Mérida	(Argentina) Lanús	(Bolivia) Real Santa Cruz
(Bolivia) The Strongest	(Brazil) Atlético Mineiro	(Brazil) Rio Branco	(Brazil) Vitória
Universidad de Chile	(Colombia) América de Cali	(Colombia) Deportes Tolima	(Ecuador) Técnico Universitario
(Paraguay) Sportivo Luqueño	(Peru) Universitario	(Uruguay) Danubio	(Uruguay) Defensor Sporting
(Venezuela) Unión Atlético Táchira	(Brazil) Portuguesa		

== Preliminary round ==
Team 1	Agg.	Team 2	1st leg	2nd leg
Estudiantes de Mérida (Venezuela)	3–3 (3–4 p)	(Venezuela) Unión Atlético Táchira	1–0	2–3
Real Santa Cruz (Bolivia)	3–1	(Bolivia) The Strongest	1–1	2–0

== Bracket ==
First round
(Venezuela) Deportivo Táchira	1	1	2
(Colombia) América de Cali	1	3	4
(Brazil) Portuguesa	1	0	1
(Brazil) Atlético Mineiro	4	0	4
(Peru) Universitario	3	0	3
(Ecuador) Técnico Universitario	0	0	0
(Colombia) Deportes Tolima	2	0	2
(Brazil) Rio Branco	1	1	2
(Bolivia) Real Santa Cruz	1	0	1
(Argentina) Lanús	1	5	6
(Brazil) Vitória	2	4	6
(Paraguay) Sportivo Luqueño	0	1	1
(Uruguay) Defensor Sporting	3	2	5
(Uruguay) Danubio	3	3	6
Universidad de Chile	2	1	3
(Argentina) Colón	1	2	3

Quarterfinals
(Colombia) América de Cali	1	1	2
(Brazil) Atlético Mineiro	2	1	3
(Peru) Universitario	0	2	2
(Colombia) Deportes Tolima	1	0	1
(Argentina) Lanús	0	3	3
(Brazil) Vitória	1	1	2
(Uruguay) Danubio	1	1	2
(Argentina) Colón	1	1	2

Semifinals
(Brazil) Atlético Mineiro	2	4	6
(Peru) Universitario	0	0	0
(Argentina) Lanús	2	1	3
(Argentina) Colón	0	1	1

Finals
(Brazil) Atlético Mineiro	4	1	5
(Argentina) Lanús	1	1	2

== First round ==
Team 1	Agg.	Team 2	1st leg	2nd leg
Deportivo Táchira (Venezuela)	2–4	(Colombia) América de Cali	1–1	1–3
Deportes Tolima (Colombia)	2–2 (3–1 p)	(Brazil) Rio Branco	2–1	0–1
Universitario (Peru)	3–0	(Ecuador) Técnico Universitario	3–0	0–0
Vitória (Brazil)	6–1	(Paraguay) Sportivo Luqueño	2–0	4–1
Real Santa Cruz (Bolivia)	1–6	(Argentina) Lanús	1–1	0–5
Portuguesa (Brazil)	1–4	(Brazil) Atlético Mineiro	1–4	0–0
Universidad de Chile	3–3 (2–3 p)	(Argentina) Colón	2–1	1–2
Defensor Sporting (Uruguay)	5–6	(Uruguay) Danubio	3–3	2–3

== Quarterfinals ==
Team 1	Agg.	Team 2	1st leg	2nd leg
Colón (Argentina)	2–2 (3–2 p)	(Uruguay) Danubio	1–1	1–1
Vitória (Brazil)	2–3	(Argentina) Lanús	1–0	1–3
Deportes Tolima (Colombia)	1–2	(Peru) Universitario	1–0	0–2
Atlético Mineiro (Brazil)	3–2	(Colombia) América de Cali	2–1	1–1

== Semifinals ==
Team 1	Agg.	Team 2	1st leg	2nd leg
Colón (Argentina)	1–3	(Argentina) Lanús	0–2	1–1
Universitario (Peru)	0–6	(Brazil) Atlético Mineiro	0–2	0–4

== Finals ==
Team 1	Agg.	Team 2	1st leg	2nd leg
Lanús (Argentina)	2–5	(Brazil) Atlético Mineiro	1–4	1–1
