= 1999 Copa CONMEBOL =

Tournament details
- Teams: 14 (from 9 confederations)

Final positions
- Champions: (Argentina) Talleres (1st title)
- Runners-up: (Brazil) CSA

Tournament statistics
- Matches played: 26
- Top scorer(s): (Brazil) Missinho (Brazil) Marcelo Araxá (4 goals each)

The 1999 Copa CONMEBOL was the eighth and last edition of CONMEBOL's annual club tournament. Teams that failed to qualify for the Copa Libertadores played in this tournament. Fourteen teams from nine South American football confederations (Uruguay sent no representatives) qualified for this tournament. Talleres defeated CSA in the finals.

== Teams ==
The following 16 teams from the 10 CONMEBOL member associations qualified for the tournament:

- Brazil: 4 berths
- Argentina: 2 berths
- Colombia: 2 berths
- Uruguay: 2 berths
- All other associations: 1 berth each

Association	Team (Berth)	Qualification method
Argentina (2 berths)	Rosario Central	1998–99 Primera División aggregate table 5th place
Argentina (2 berths)	Talleres	1998–99 Primera División aggregate table 16th place
Bolivia (1 berth)	Independiente Petrolero	1998 Primera División 4th place
Brazil (4 berths)	CSA	1999 Copa do Nordeste semifinalist
Brazil (4 berths)	Vila Nova	1999 Copa Centro-Oeste runners-up
Brazil (4 berths)	São Raimundo	1999 Copa Norte champions
Brazil (4 berths)	Paraná	1999 Copa Sul runners-up
Chile (1 berth)	Deportes Concepción	1998 Primera División 5th place
Colombia (1 berth)	Atlético Huila	1998 Primera A aggregate table 9th place
Colombia (1 berth)	Deportes Quindío	Invited
Ecuador (1 berth)	Deportivo Cuenca	1998 Fase Nacional de la Copa CONMEBOL winners
Paraguay (1 berths)	San Lorenzo	1999 Apertura 6th place
Peru (1 berth)	Sport Boys	1998 Copa CONMEBOL play-off runners-up
Uruguay (2 berths)	Rentistas	1998 Liguilla Pre-Copa Libertadores 3rd place
Uruguay (2 berths)	River Plate	1998 Liguilla Pre-Copa Libertadores 4th place
Venezuela (1 berth)	Estudiantes de Mérida	1998–99 Primera División aggregate table best team

== Bracket ==
First round
(Brazil) Vila Nova	0	2	2 (3)
(Brazil) CSA	2	0	2 (4)
(Colombia) Deportes Quindío	0	2	2 (3)
(Venezuela) Estudiantes de Mérida	2	0	2 (5)
(Brazil) São Raimundo	2	2	4
(Colombia) Atlético Huila	1	1	2
(Peru) Sport Boys	2	0	2 (4)
(Ecuador) Deportivo Cuenca	2	0	2 (3)
(Paraguay) San Lorenzo	0	2	2 (1)
(Brazil) Paraná	1	1	2 (3)
(Argentina) Talleres	1	3	4 (5)
(Bolivia) Independiente Petrolero	4	0	4 (4)
(Argentina) Rosario Central	—	—	—
Bye	—	—	—
(Chile) Deportes Concepción	—	—	—
Bye	—	—	—

Quarterfinals
(Brazil) CSA	0	3	3
(Venezuela) Estudiantes de Mérida	0	1	1
(Brazil) São Raimundo	1	4	5
(Peru) Sport Boys	1	0	1
(Brazil) Paraná	0	1	1 (1)
(Argentina) Talleres	1	0	1 (3)
(Argentina) Rosario Central	2	1	3
(Chile) Deportes Concepción	2	2	4

Semifinals
(Brazil) CSA	0	2	2 (5)
(Brazil) São Raimundo	1	1	2 (4)
(Argentina) Talleres	2	1	3
(Chile) Deportes Concepción	1	1	2

Finals
(Brazil) CSA	4	0	4
(Argentina) Talleres	2	3	5

== First round ==
Team 1	Agg.	Team 2	1st leg	2nd leg
Vila Nova (Brazil)	2–2 (3–4 p)	(Brazil) CSA	0–2	2–0
Deportes Quindío (Colombia)	2–2 (3–5 p)	(Venezuela) Estudiantes de Mérida	2–0	0–2
São Raimundo (Brazil)	4-2	(Colombia) Atlético Huila	2–1	2–1
Deportivo Cuenca (Ecuador)	2–2 (3–4 p)	(Peru) Sport Boys	2–2	0–0
San Lorenzo (Paraguay)	2–2 (1–3 p)	(Brazil) Paraná	0–1	2–1
Talleres (Argentina)	4–4 (5–4 p)	(Bolivia) Independiente Petrolero	1–4	3–0

== Quarter finals ==
Team 1	Agg.	Team 2	1st leg	2nd leg
CSA (Brazil)	3–1	(Venezuela) Estudiantes de Mérida	0–0	3–1
São Raimundo (Brazil)	5–1	(Peru) Sport Boys	1–1	4–0
Talleres (Argentina)	1–1 (3–1 p)	(Brazil) Paraná	1–0	0–1
Deportes Concepción (Chile)	4–3	(Argentina) Rosario Central	2–2	2–1

== Semi finals ==
Team 1	Agg.	Team 2	1st leg	2nd leg
São Raimundo (Brazil)	2–2 (4–5 p)	(Brazil) CSA	1–0	1–2
Deportes Concepción (Chile)	2–3	(Argentina) Talleres	1–2	1–1

== Finals ==
Team 1	Agg.	Team 2	1st leg	2nd leg
Talleres (Argentina)	5–4	(Brazil) CSA	2–4	3–0
