= Clube Atlético Mineiro in international club football =

- Club: Atlético Mineiro
- First entry: 1972 Copa Libertadores
- Latest entry: 2026 Copa Sudamericana

Titles
- Copa Libertadores: 1 (2013)
- Copa CONMEBOL: 2 (1992, 1997)
- Recopa Sudamericana: 1 (2014)

The involvement of Clube Atlético Mineiro in international club football began in 1972, the year of its first appearance in an official competition at that level. Since then, the Brazilian club, based in Belo Horizonte, Minas Gerais, has participated in 31 continental and one intercontinental tournament. Atlético Mineiro has won four official titles at the international level: the Copa Libertadores in 2013; the inaugural edition of the Copa CONMEBOL in 1992, and again in 1997; and the Recopa Sudamericana in 2014. In addition, the club finished as runner-up of the Copa CONMEBOL in 1995, the Copa de Oro in 1993, and the Copa Master de CONMEBOL in 1996.

Prior to the existence of official continental football in South America, Atlético Mineiro had played against foreign clubs since 1929, and toured Europe in 1950. As Brazilian champion in 1971, the club qualified for the 1972 Copa Libertadores, its first continental tournament. Atlético Mineiro then debuted in the inaugural editions of the Copa CONMEBOL, in 1992, of the Copa de Oro, in 1993, and of the Copa Master de CONMEBOL, in 1996. Its first and only appearance in the Copa Mercosur was in the 2000 season, and its debut at the Copa Sudamericana was in 2003, the first time Brazilian clubs had participated. The club's first and only appearance in an intercontinental competition occurred in the 2013 edition of the FIFA Club World Cup, where it finished in third place.

The club's biggest-margin win at the international level is 6–0, achieved twice against Mineros in the 1995 Copa CONMEBOL, and against Cobreloa in the 2000 Copa Libertadores. Goalkeeper Victor is the player with the most appearances in international competitions for the club, with 41; forwards Guilherme and Jô are Atlético's top goalscorers with 11 goals.

== Background ==
Prior to the inception of official international competitions between football clubs, Atlético Mineiro was the first team in Minas Gerais to play against a foreign team defeating Portugal's Vitória de Setúbal in Belo Horizonte in 1929. Over the following decades, the club played friendlies against foreign sides, including national teams, and in 1950 went on its first European tour, during which it played ten games in five countries. Having taken place soon after the traumatic Maracanazo, the tour and Atlético's results, many of which were achieved in adverse weather, including snow, were seen by national sports media as a historic achievement for Brazilian football itself.

The first continental competition organised by CONMEBOL, the governing body of football in South America, was the 1960 Copa Libertadores. Before this official tournament, Chilean club Colo-Colo's President Robinson Alvarez had the idea for a South American Championship of Champions, which was eventually held in Santiago in 1948. In 1958, the new CONMEBOL president, José Ramos de Freitas, contacted South American football associations intending to introduce an annual competition for clubs on the continent. The following year, at a CONMEBOL congress in Caracas, the creation of a South American Champions Cup was decided, renamed as Copa Libertadores in honour of the heroes of South American liberation.

From 1959 to 1968 the champions and runners-up of the Taça Brasil were the Brazilian representatives in the Copa Libertadores; the national competition had been created with the purpose of selecting the country's entrants in the continental tournament. Brazilian clubs did not enter the 1966, 1969 or 1970 editions of the competition, and in 1971 the champion and runner-up of the Torneio Roberto Gomes Pedrosa filled Brazil's berths. From 1972 to 1989, the champions and runners-up of the Campeonato Brasileiro became the representatives; from 1990 to 1999, the champions of the Copa do Brasil, the national cup, occupied the second Brazilian berth. Copa Libertadores saw an increase in the number of participating teams in 2000, and since then the runners-up, and other best-placed teams in the Brasileiro, also qualify for the continental tournament.

Copa Libertadores was the only continental competition in South America until the creation of the Supercopa Libertadores in 1988, and the Recopa Sudamericana in 1989. The first was contested between past champions of the main continental tournament, while the second was played by the winners of the Libertadores and the Supercopa of the previous year. In 1992, Copa CONMEBOL was established, being a competition for the best-placed clubs in the national leagues that did not qualify for the Copa Libertadores. Other Copas were also created by the continental confederation in the 1990s, some of them with a single game, mainly contested between past winners of the previous competitions. Copa Mercosur and the Copa Merconorte replaced the Supercopa in 1998, and eventually absorbed Copa CONMEBOL in 2000. The two competitions were replaced by the Copa Sudamericana in 2002, which remains active as the second-most important tournament on the continent.

From 1960 to 2004, CONMEBOL and UEFA, the administrative body of European football, jointly organised the Intercontinental Cup, a competition between the winners of the Copa Libertadores and the European Cup (the later UEFA Champions League). It was replaced in 2005 by the FIFA Club World Cup (which had a pilot edition in 2000), a worldwide event contested between the winners of the continental competitions of all six continental confederations.

== History ==
=== Early appearances (1972–1981) ===
Atlético Mineiro's first participated in the Copa Libertadores in 1972, having qualified as champion of the inaugural Campeonato Brasileiro in 1971. In the first stage, Atlético was drawn in Group 3, along with Paraguayan clubs Olimpia and Cerro Porteño, and fellow Brazilian club São Paulo, runner-up of the Brasileiro. Atlético failed to advance to the second stage, after drawing four games and losing one to Cerro Porteño. A match against Olimpia in Paraguay was abandoned in the 84th minute at 2–2, because Atlético had five players sent off; the points were awarded to the Paraguayan club. According to Atlético left-back Oldair, Olimpia played a violent game, and at one point Atlético's players decided to reciprocate. They were subsequently attacked and beaten by local police.

Atlético did not participate in the Copa Libertadores again until 1978, when it qualified after finishing as runner-up to São Paulo in the 1977 Brasileirão. The Brazilian clubs were again drawn into Group 3, this time with Chilean clubs as opposition: Unión Española and Palestino. Atlético qualified for the second stage undefeated, with four wins and two ties. In the semi-finals, then played as a group stage with three teams, the club faced Boca Juniors and River Plate from Argentina. Atlético won only one match, against River, and Boca advanced to the competition finals, which it went on to win.

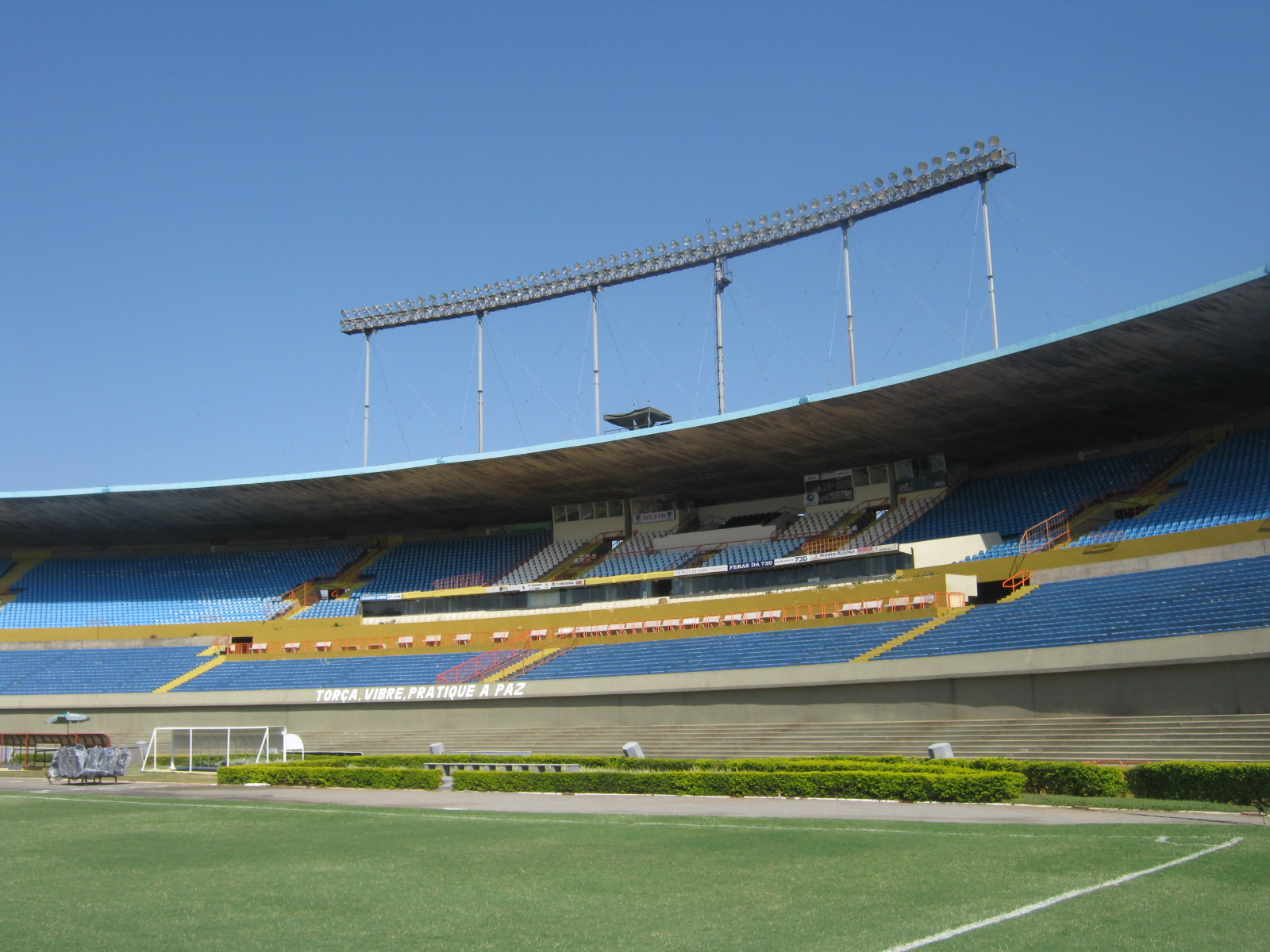
Estádio Serra Dourada (pictured), in Goiânia, was the venue of a one-game playoff match between Atlético Mineiro and Flamengo in the 1981 Copa Libertadores.

After a two-year absence from the Copa Libertadores, Atlético qualified for the 1981 edition as runner-up of the 1980 Campeonato Brasileiro, which it had lost to Flamengo. The refereeing in the finals had been controversial, as Atlético forward Reinaldo was sent off with a straight red card after scoring a brace. Brazil's representatives were once again drawn into Group 3, together with Olimpia and Cerro Porteño, whom Atlético faced for a second time in a group stage of the Libertadores. The two encounters between the Brazilian clubs ended 2–2, and both won two and drew two matches against the Paraguayans, meaning Atlético and Flamengo were tied on points. According to the competition's rules, a one-game playoff in a neutral stadium had to be played between the clubs to decide which one would advance to the semifinals.

The playoff match was played at Serra Dourada Stadium, in Goiânia, a venue selected by Flamengo. Atlético elected the referee, José Roberto Wright who, until the match, was considered the best in the country. At the 33rd minute of the match, Atlético forward and star player Reinaldo received a straight red card from the referee after fouling Flamengo's Zico, in what was described by the press as a "normal" foul and "without much violence". After the foul, Atlético player Éder was sent off for complaining, and the game was stopped. A turmoil started, and Atlético players Palhinha and Chicão were also sent off for insulting the referee. Left with seven players, Atlético's goalkeeper João Leite claimed he was injured when the match was restarted, but Wright did not stop the game. Atlético defender Osmar then held the ball with his hands, preventing the restart, and was also sent off. The match ended as a goalless draw at the 37-minute mark because Atlético had fewer than seven players on the field. The result meant qualification for Flamengo, as it had the best goal difference in the group stage.

Here in Goiânia, what happened? Expecting to watch a great game, expecting to watch Reinaldo, Zico, Cerezo, Éder and other big aces of Brazilian and world football, a multitude completely crowded the Serra Dourada and ended up watching this shame of our football. The match transformed itself in one of the biggest robberies of recent times. It was an organised robbery.

— João Saldanha (journalist and former head coach of the Brazil national team). Jornal do Brasil, 22 August 1981.

After the match, Atlético unsuccessfully appealed to a CONMEBOL court for its annulment. According to Wright, Reinaldo's foul was indeed "normal", but he was sent off because of a previous verbal warning. He also stated that Éder, Palhinha and Chicão continued to be undisciplined and that he had to send Éder off to not lose control of the match. The episode and referee Wright's performance were described by Brazilian and South American media at the time as "shameful", "deplorable" and "disgraceful". Flamengo advanced to the semi-finals and went on to win the competition.

Fixtures in international competitions (1972–81) (Note: Atlético Mineiro goals always listed first.)
Season	Competition	Round	Opposition	Home	Away	Agg./Pos.	Ref.
1972	Copa Libertadores	GS	(Brazil) São Paulo	2–2	0–0	4th	
1972	Copa Libertadores	GS	(Paraguay) Cerro Porteño	1–1	0–1	4th	
1972	Copa Libertadores	GS	(Paraguay) Olimpia	0–0	2–2 (Note: Match ended at 2–2 after 87 minutes, because Atlético Mineiro was left with less than seven players on the field, after five sendings off. Points awarded to Olimpia.)	4th	
1978	Copa Libertadores	GS	(Chile) Unión Española	5–1	1–1	1st	
1978	Copa Libertadores	GS	(Brazil) São Paulo	1–1	2–1	1st	
1978	Copa Libertadores	GS	(Chile) Palestino	2–0	5–4	1st	
1978	Copa Libertadores	SF	(Argentina) Boca Juniors	1–2	1–3	3rd	
1978	Copa Libertadores	SF	(Argentina) River Plate	1–0	0–1	3rd	
1981	Copa Libertadores	GS	(Brazil) Flamengo	2–2	2–2	2nd	
1981	Copa Libertadores	GS	(Paraguay) Olimpia	1–0	0–0	2nd	
1981	Copa Libertadores	GS	(Paraguay) Cerro Porteño	2–2	1–2	2nd	
1981	Copa Libertadores	PO	(Brazil) Flamengo	—N/a	—N/a	0–0 (Note: One-game playoff; match ended at 0–0 after 37 minutes, because Atlético Mineiro was left with less than seven players on the field, after five sendings-off. Match ended as draw, Flamengo advanced by having the best goal difference in the group stage.)	

=== First titles and finals (1992–1998) ===
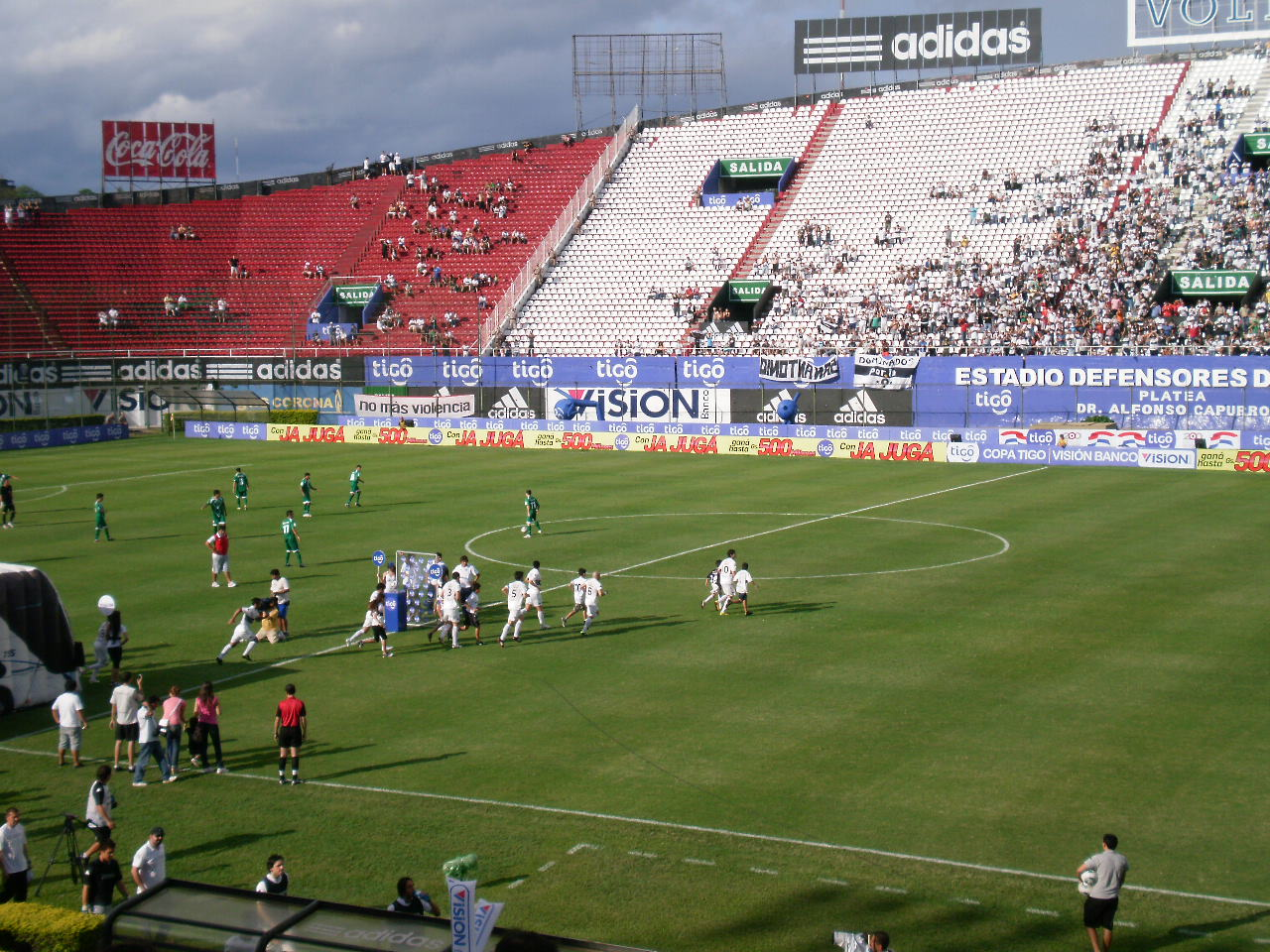
Atlético Mineiro won its first international title, the 1992 Copa CONMEBOL, at Estadio Defensores del Chaco (pictured).

Atlético only returned to official international football in 1992, taking part in the inaugural edition of the Copa CONMEBOL, a new competition organised by the continental confederation; the club earned a berth in the competition by finishing third in the 1991 Campeonato Brasileiro Série A. Copa CONMEBOL was contested among 16 teams, which played two-legged knockout ties. In the first round, Atlético eliminated fellow Brazilian side Fluminense with an aggregate score of 6–3, after a 2–1 away loss and a 5–1 home victory. The team then faced Colombia's Atlético Junior in the quarter-finals, advancing with a 5–2 aggregate score. Ecuadorian side El Nacional was the opponent in the semi-finals, in which Atlético lost the first leg at Quito by 1–0 and won the second at home by 2–0 to advance. Olimpia, a team which Atlético had already faced in two Copa Libertadores tournaments, was the club's opposition in the finals. After a 2–0 home win with a brace by Negrini at the Mineirão, and a 1–0 away defeat at the Defensores del Chaco, Atlético won its first official international trophy. Aílton, an Atlético forward, scored six goals in the competition and was its top goalscorer.

As the 1992 Copa CONMEBOL winner, Atlético Mineiro qualified for the following year's edition of the competition, and for the 1993 edition of the Copa de Oro, a new tournament organised by CONMEBOL, contested between the winners of all the continental competitions of the previous year: Copa Libertadores, Copa CONMEBOL, Supercopa Libertadores, and Copa Master de Supercopa. In the Copa de Oro, Atlético faced its biggest rivals Cruzeiro in the semi-final, played as a single match at the Mineirão, the home stadium for both clubs, in front of a crowd of both teams' fans. The game ended 0–0, and Atlético advanced to its second continental finals after winning a penalty shootout by 5–4. The team faced the Boca Juniors in the finals, and finished as runner-up after drawing the first leg 0–0 at the Mineirão, and losing the second 1–0 at La Bombonera. In the Copa CONMEBOL, Atlético again eliminated Fluminense in the first round (this time in a penalty shootout), and defeated Peru's Sipesa in the quarter-finals with an aggregate score of 2–1. Atlético club was eliminated in the semi-finals by Botafogo, the eventual winner of the tournament, after winning the first leg 3–1 at home, but losing the second 3–0.

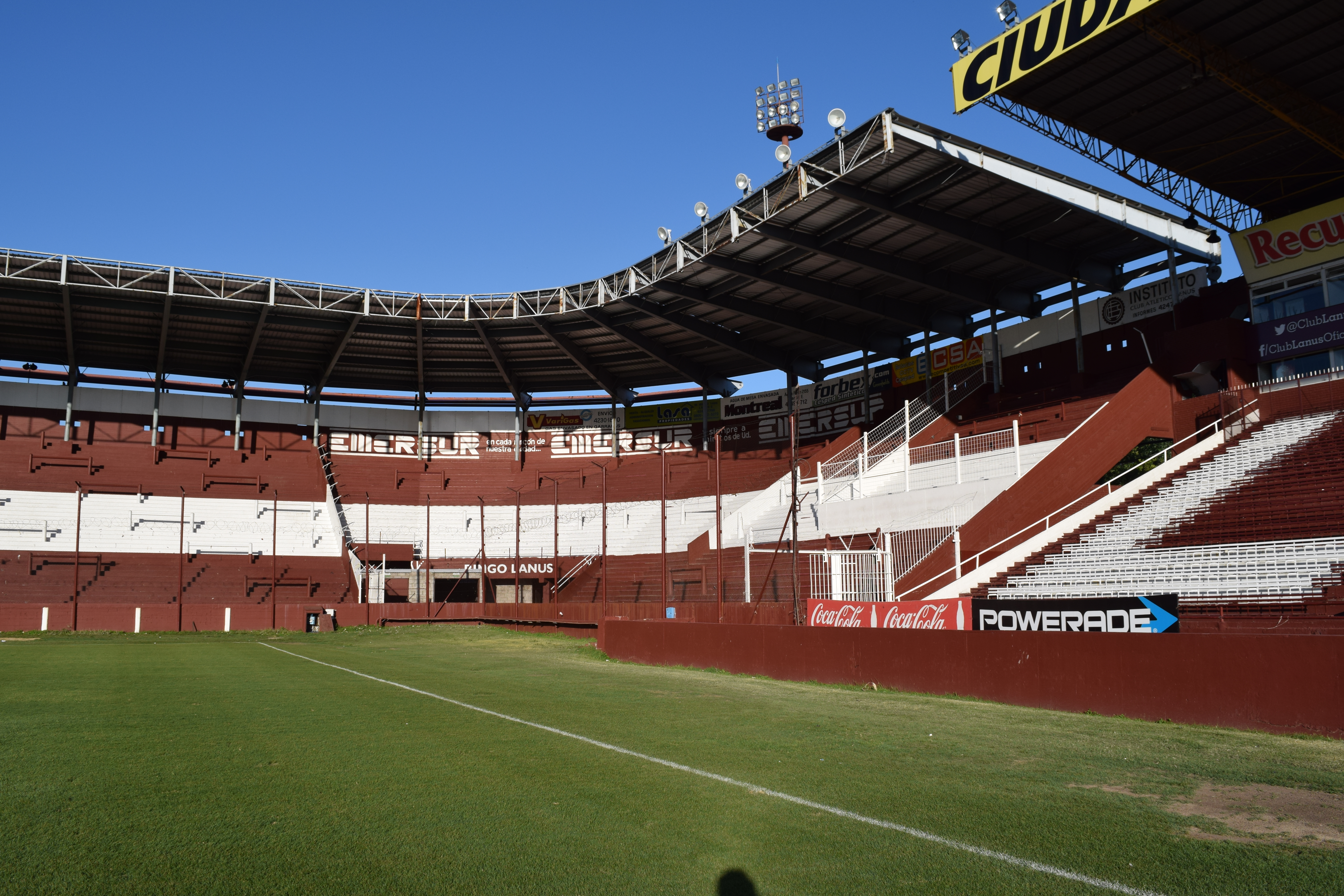
Atlético Mineiro players and staff were trapped against the fence of Lanús' stadium La Fortaleza (pictured), venue of the first leg of the 1997 Copa CONMEBOL Finals.

Absent from continental football for one season, Atlético Mineiro returned to the Copa CONMEBOL in the 1995 edition, qualifying after finishing fourth in the 1994 Brasileiro. The team eliminated Brazil's Guarani in the first stage with an aggregate score of 2–1, before defeating Venezuelan club Mineros de Guayana, with a club record home (6–0) and aggregate (10–0) win scores. In the semi-finals, Atlético faced Colombia's América de Cali, and advanced after winning a penalty shootout by 4–3, following a 4–3 away defeat, and a 1–0 home win. In its second Copa CONMEBOL final, Atlético faced Argentine side Rosario Central, and secured a significant advantage in the series with a 4–0 win at the Mineirão. However, in the second leg of the finals played in the Gigante de Arroyito, Atlético suffered a shocking 4–0 defeat, with a goal scored by Rosario at the 87th minute. The title was decided on penalties, with a 4–3 score favouring Central. In the following year, Atlético took part in the Copa Master de CONMEBOL, a single-edition competition contested in Cuiabá between the past winners of the Copa CONMEBOL: Atlético, Botafogo, São Paulo, and Rosario Central. Only a few months after the previous year's defeat, Atlético faced Central again, this time winning 10–9 on penalties after a 0–0 draw. Atlético lost to São Paulo 3–0 in the final match, played at the Verdão.

After finishing third in the 1996 Campeonato Brasileiro Série A, Atlético Mineiro qualified for the 1997 Copa CONMEBOL. Their opponent in the first stage was Série A runner-up Portuguesa, which had eliminated Atlético in the semi-finals of the national championship. This time, Atlético eliminated Portuguesa with a 4–1 aggregate score. In the quarter-finals, the team faced and eliminated América de Cali for a second time in its history. The opposition in the semi-finals was Peru's Universitario, defeated by Atlético with a 6–0 aggregate score. Atlético then faced an Argentine team in a continental final for the third time. With title holders Lanús as the opponent, Atlético took the lead in the series with a 4–1 away win at La Fortaleza in Lanús. After the match, Atlético players and staff were trapped against the fence surrounding the pitch and attacked by Lanús players and supporters. Among the players and staff injured in the confrontation, Atlético head coach Emerson Leão had to undergo surgery after being hit in the face. The second leg was played at the Mineirão, and this time the team's advantage was secured with a 1–1 draw, and Atlético won its second international title undefeated. Atlético forward Valdir was the top scorer of the competition with seven goals.

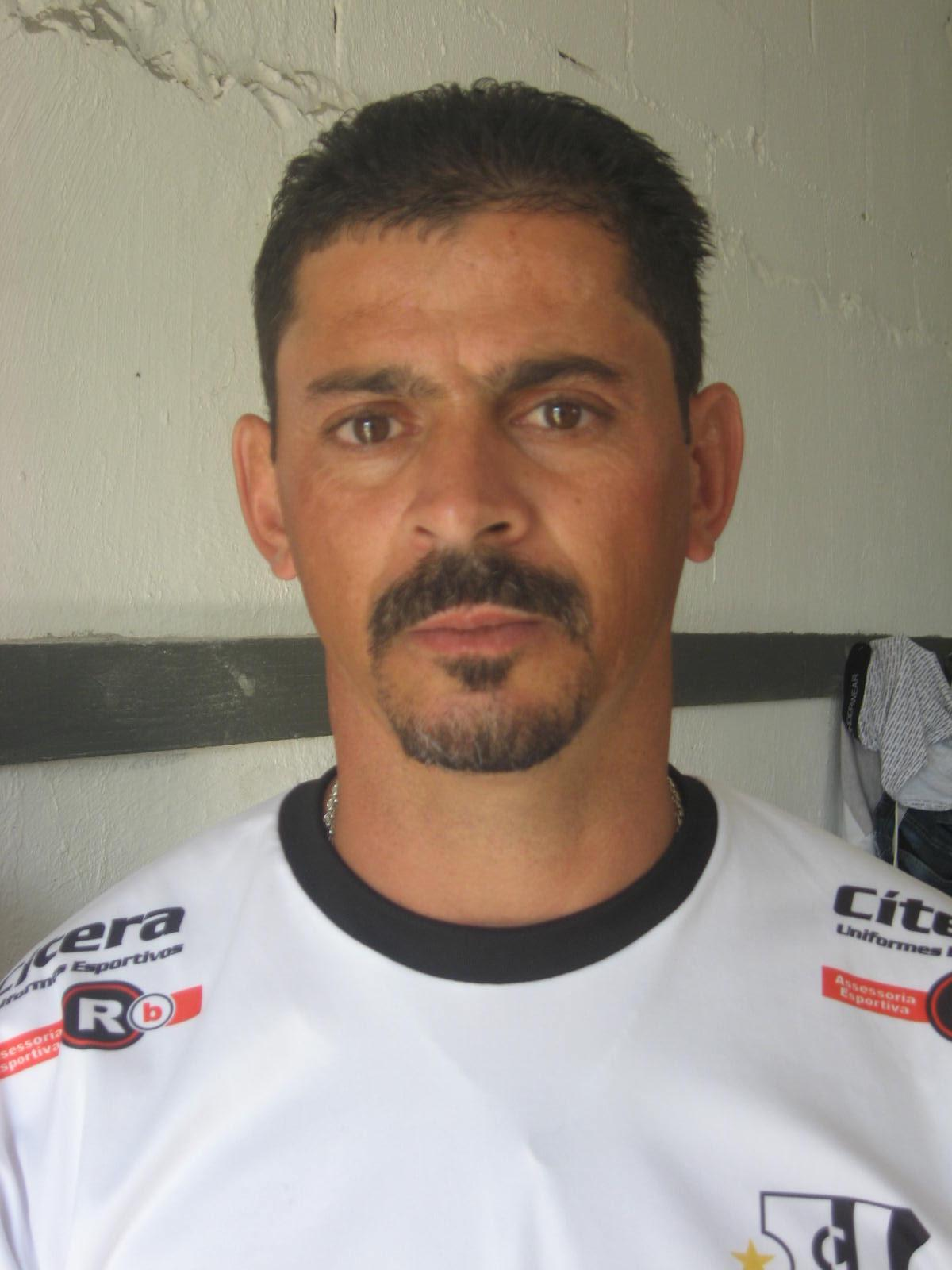
Valdir, nicknamed Bigode ("Mustache"), was the top goalscorer of the 1997 Copa CONMEBOL with seven goals.

As champion of the 1997 edition, the club qualified for the 1998 Copa CONMEBOL. Atlético eliminated Paraguayan side Cerro Corá on penalties in the first round, and Bolivia's Jorge Wilstermann in the quarterfinals with a 4–1 aggregate score. In the semi-finals, Atlético faced Rosario Central for a third time in continental football, and was eliminated after a 1–1 draw at the Gigante de Arroyito and a 1–0 defeat at home. It was the last time the club participated in the Copa CONMEBOL, as the competition's final edition was played in 1999, and Atlético did not qualify.

Fixtures in international competitions (1992–98)
Season	Competition	Round	Opposition	Home	Away	Agg.	Ref.
1992	Copa CONMEBOL	R16	(Brazil) Fluminense	5–1	1–2	6–3	
1992	Copa CONMEBOL	QF	(Colombia) Junior	3–0	2–2	5–2	
1992	Copa CONMEBOL	SF	(Ecuador) El Nacional	2–0	0–1	2–1	
1992	Copa CONMEBOL	F	(Paraguay) Olimpia	2–0	0–1	2–1	
1993	Copa de Oro	SF	(Brazil) Cruzeiro	—N/a	—N/a	0–0 (Note: Match played with split-crowd; Atlético Mineiro 5–4 Cruzeiro, on penalties.)	
1993	Copa de Oro	F	(Argentina) Boca Juniors	0–0	0–1	0–1	
1993	Copa CONMEBOL	R16	(Brazil) Fluminense	2–0	0–2	2–2 (Note: Atlético Mineiro 4–2 Fluminense, on penalties.)	
1993	Copa CONMEBOL	QF	(Peru) Sipesa	1–0	1–1	2–1	
1993	Copa CONMEBOL	SF	(Brazil) Botafogo	3–1	0–3	3–4	
1995	Copa CONMEBOL	R1	(Brazil) Guarani	1–1	1–0	2–1	
1995	Copa CONMEBOL	QF	(Venezuela) Mineros	6–0	4–0	10–0	
1995	Copa CONMEBOL	SF	(Colombia) América	1–0	3–4	4–4 (Note: Atlético Mineiro 4–3 América de Cali, on penalties.)	
1995	Copa CONMEBOL	F	(Argentina) Rosario Central	4–0	0–4	4–4 (Note: Atlético Mineiro 3–4 Rosario Central, on penalties.)	
1996	Copa Master de CONMEBOL	SF	(Argentina) Rosario Central	—N/a	—N/a	0–0 (Note: Match played in neutral venue; Atlético Mineiro 10–9 Rosario Central, on penalties.)	
1996	Copa Master de CONMEBOL	F	(Brazil) São Paulo	—N/a	—N/a	0–3 (Note: Match played in neutral venue.)	
1997	Copa CONMEBOL	R16	(Brazil) Portuguesa	0–0	4–1	4–1	
1997	Copa CONMEBOL	QF	(Colombia) América	2–1	1–1	3–2	
1997	Copa CONMEBOL	SF	(Peru) Universitario	4–0	2–0	6–0	
1997	Copa CONMEBOL	F	(Argentina) Lanús	1–1	4–1	5–2	
1998	Copa CONMEBOL	R16	(Paraguay) Cerro Corá	2–2	0–0	2–2 (Note: Atlético Mineiro 4–2 Cerro Corá, on penalties.)	
1998	Copa CONMEBOL	QF	(Bolivia) Jorge Wilstermann	3–1	1–0	4–1	
1998	Copa CONMEBOL	SF	(Argentina) Rosario Central	0–1	1–1	1–2	

=== Sudamericana years (2000–2011) ===
Atlético did not take part in any continental competitions in 1999, but as Série A runner-up in that year the club qualified for the 2000 Copa Libertadores and the 2000 Copa Mercosur. The latter was a new continental competition introduced in 1998, which eventually replaced both the Copa CONMEBOL and the Supercopa Libertadores for clubs in Brazil, Argentina, Paraguay, and Uruguay. In its return to the Copa Libertadores after nineteen years, Atlético was drawn in Group 8, with Bolivian Club Bolívar, Uruguayan side Bella Vista, and Chile's Cobreloa. Atlético's form in the group stage was erratic, but enough to ensure qualification for the next stage in second place. The team won its three home matches, which included a joint-record 6–0 victory against Cobreloa, and lost the three away ones, also with a joint-record, a 4–0 defeat against Bolívar. In the round of 16, the team faced Brazilian side Atlético Paranaense, which it eliminated by a score of 5–3 in a penalty shootout, after winning 1–0 at home and losing 2–1 away. The team's opponent in the quarter-finals was Corinthians, winner of the previous year's Série A finals over Atlético. After drawing 1–1 at the Mineirão, Atlético was defeated 2–1 in São Paulo and eliminated.

In the Copa Mercosur, Atlético was drawn into Group E, with fellow Brazilian club Vasco da Gama, Uruguay's Peñarol and San Lorenzo from Argentina. The team qualified for the quarter-finals as first in the group, winning four games, drawing one with Peñarol, and losing only one to eventual champions Vasco. In the quarter-finals, Atlético eliminated Boca Juniors, winning 2–0 at the Mineirão, and drawing 2–2 at La Bombonera. The opposition in the semi-finals was Palmeiras, winner of the 1999 Copa Libertadores and runner-up of the 1999 Mercosur. Atlético lost both legs, by 4–1 in São Paulo and 2–0 at home, and was eliminated.

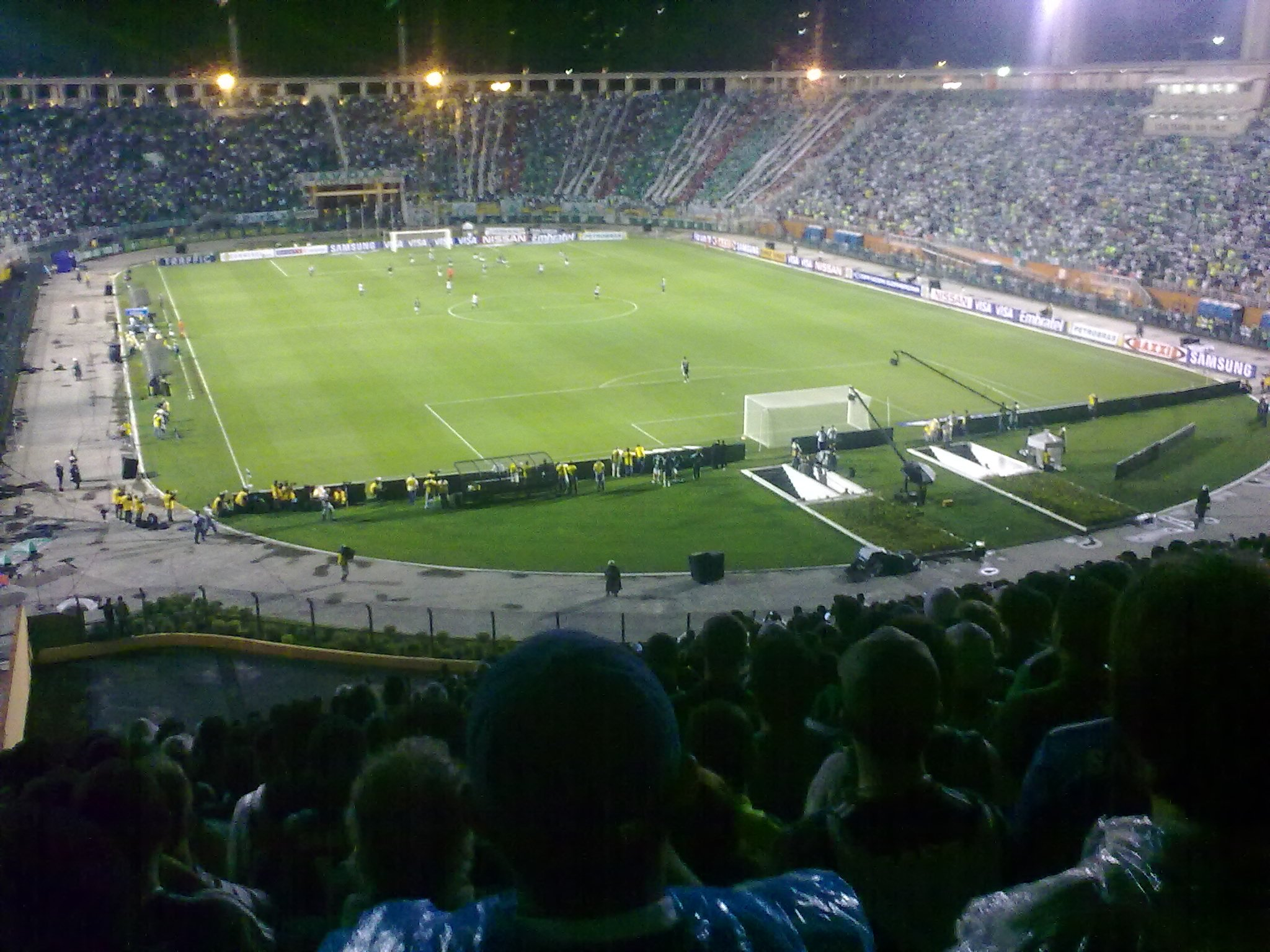
Match between Palmeiras and Atlético Mineiro at the Pacaembu, in the 2010 Copa Sudamericana.

Atlético Mineiro did not qualify for any continental competitions in 2001 or 2002, a season in which Brazil did not have representatives in the first edition of Copa Sudamericana, the new cup which replaced Copa Mercosur and Copa Merconorte. The club qualified for the 2003 Copa Sudamericana, taking part in a single round-robin preliminary group stage for Brazilian clubs, with Fluminense and Corinthians. Atlético defeated the latter 2–0 in São Paulo, but lost to the former 2–0 at home, and did not qualify for the second preliminary stage. The club became a regular participant in the Copa Sudamericana in the 2000s, but failed to advance from the Brazilian preliminary round in most tournaments. In 2004, Atlético fell to Goiás with a 4–2 away loss and a 1–1 home draw. Going through a bad period in its history, which included relegation in 2005, the club was absent from continental football for three years between 2005 and 2007.

Following its return to the Série A in 2007, the team finished eighth in the league and earned a spot in the following year's Copa Sudamericana, but was eliminated in the first stage, after losing 8–3 on aggregate against Botafogo. In the 2009 edition, Atlético again fell to Goiás in the first stage, this time on penalties. After finishing in seventh place in the 2009 Série A, Atlético qualified for the 2010 Copa Sudamericana, and advanced from the second preliminary stage by eliminating Grêmio Prudente after drawing 0–0 and winning 1–0. Atlético then faced Colombian side Santa Fe in the round of 16, winning the first leg by 2–0 and losing the second 1–0 to advance. Palmeiras was the opponent in the quarter-finals, and Atlético was eliminated with a 1–1 draw at home and a 2–0 defeat at São Paulo. The club also took part in the 2011 Copa Sudamericana, again falling to Botafogo in the preliminary stage with two losses.

Fixtures in international competitions (2000–11)
Season	Competition	Round	Opposition	Home	Away	Agg./Pos.	Ref.
2000	Copa Libertadores	GS	(Bolivia) Bolívar	1–0	0–4	2nd	
2000	Copa Libertadores	GS	(Uruguay) Bella Vista	2–1	0–1	2nd	
2000	Copa Libertadores	GS	(Chile) Cobreloa	6–0	0–1	2nd	
2000	Copa Libertadores	R16	(Brazil) Atlético Paranaense	1–0	1–2	2–2 (Note: Atlético Mineiro 5–3 Atlético Paranaense, on penalties.)	
2000	Copa Libertadores	QF	(Brazil) Corinthians	1–1	1–2	2–3	
2000	Copa Mercosur	GS	(Uruguay) Peñarol	2–1	2–2	1st	
2000	Copa Mercosur	GS	(Brazil) Vasco da Gama	2–0	0–2	1st	
2000	Copa Mercosur	GS	(Argentina) San Lorenzo	3–2	4–3	1st	
2000	Copa Mercosur	QF	(Argentina) Boca Juniors	2–0	2–2	4–2	
2000	Copa Mercosur	SF	(Brazil) Palmeiras	0–2	1–4	1–6	
2003	Copa Sudamericana	PR	(Brazil) Corinthians	—N/a	2–0	2nd	
2003	Copa Sudamericana	PR	(Brazil) Fluminense	0–2	—N/a	2nd	
2004	Copa Sudamericana	PR	(Brazil) Goiás	1–1	2–4	3–5	
2008	Copa Sudamericana	R1	(Brazil) Botafogo	2–5	1–3	3–8	
2009	Copa Sudamericana	R1	(Brazil) Goiás	1–1	1–1	2–2 (Note: Atlético Mineiro 5–6 Goiás, on penalties.)	
2010	Copa Sudamericana	R2	(Brazil) Grêmio Prudente	1–0	0–0	1–0	
2010	Copa Sudamericana	R16	(Colombia) Santa Fe	2–0	0–1	2–1	
2010	Copa Sudamericana	QF	(Brazil) Palmeiras	1–1	0–2	1–3	
2011	Copa Sudamericana	R2	(Brazil) Botafogo	1–2	0–1	1–3	

=== Libertadores winner and regular (2013–2021) ===
After an unsuccessful season in the national league in 2011, where it did not qualify for the following season's continental tournaments, Atlético finished as runner-up in the 2012 Campeonato Brasileiro, qualifying for the Copa Libertadores for the first time in twelve years. The team entered the competition in the second stage, and was drawn into Group 3, together with Argentine club Arsenal de Sarandí, Bolivia's The Strongest, and São Paulo once again. With a squad composed of Ronaldinho, Jô, Diego Tardelli, Bernard and a returning Gilberto Silva, Atlético dominated the group, winning its first five matches. São Paulo inflicted the team's only loss in the last match, but Atlético had already secured the best performance of the competition's group stage, which meant the second legs in further rounds would be played at home. São Paulo, as the worst runner-up of the group stage, was also the team's opponent in the round of 16. Atlético won the first leg, played at the Morumbi, after a 2–1 comeback; in the second leg, played at the Estádio Independência (the club's new first-choice home ground since the previous year), the team won 4–1 with a hat-trick by Jô to advance.

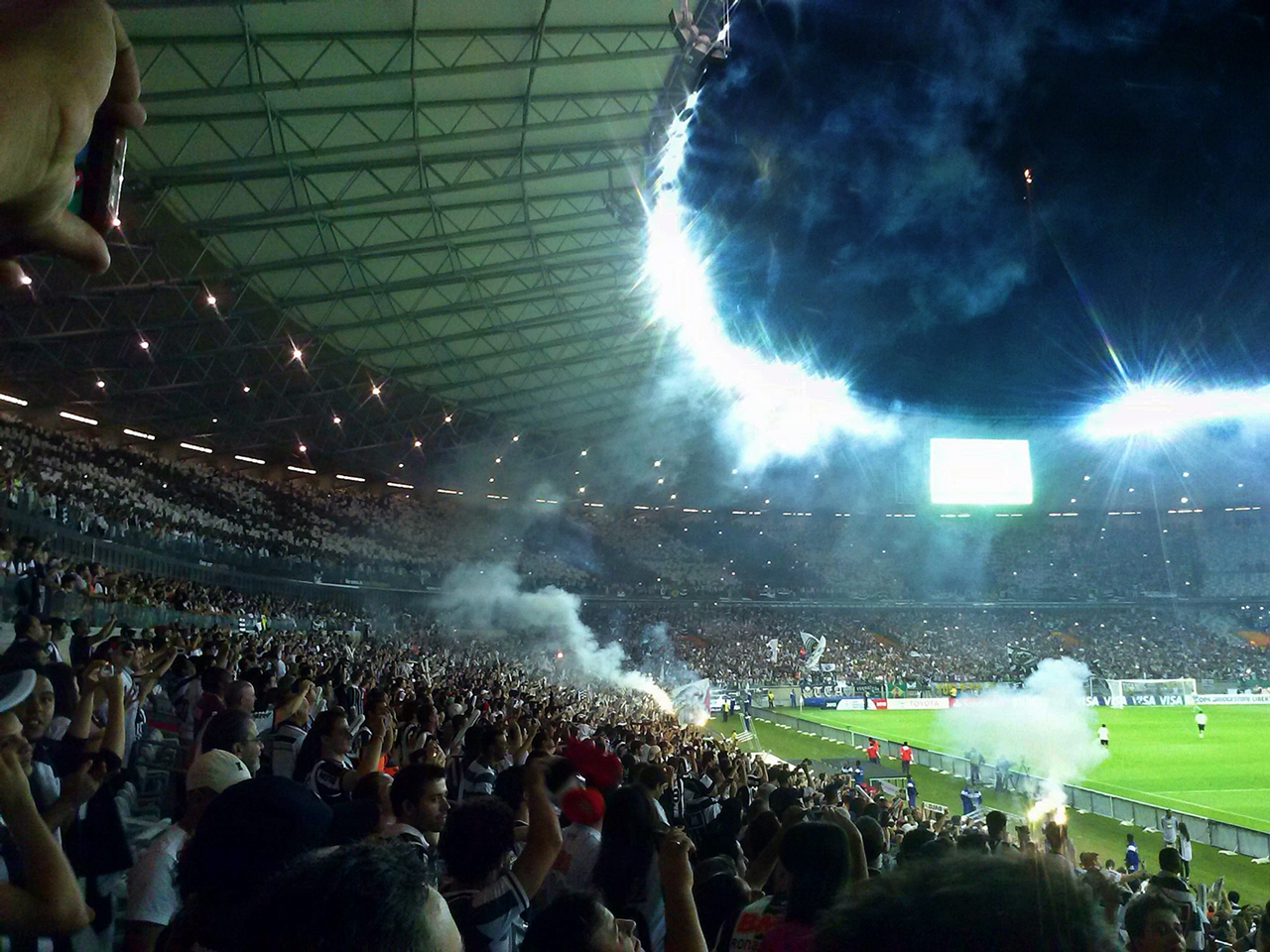
Atlético Mineiro supporters at the Mineirão in the second leg of the 2013 Copa Libertadores Finals

Mexico's Club Tijuana was the opponent in the quarter-finals, and the first leg, contested in Tijuana, ended 2–2 with an equaliser goal by Atlético's Luan in injury time. In the second leg, Tijuana opened the scoring but Atlético evened the score in the first half with a goal by the team's captain, Réver. An iconic moment for the club occurred when a penalty kick was awarded to Tijuana in injury time. If Duvier Riascos' shot had scored, it would have meant elimination, but it was saved by Atlético's goalkeeper Victor with his foot. The save, according to sports commentators and supporters, represented the "kicking out" of the club's historic "jinx". In the semi-finals, Atlético faced Argentine champion Newell's Old Boys, and lost the first leg 2–0 in Rosario. In the second leg, after an interruption at 1–0 because of a failure in the Independência's floodlights, Atlético made the score 2–0 six minutes into injury time to equalise the series. The team advanced after winning 3–2 on penalties.

In the finals, Atlético faced Olimpia for the second time in a continental decision, and the Paraguayan club won the first leg, played at the Defensores del Chaco, by 2–0. The competition's rules demanded a stadium with at least a capacity of 40,000 for the finals, and the second leg was played at the Mineirão. A Jô goal in the beginning of the second half, and a header by Leonardo Silva at the 87th minute, equalised the aggregate, and the match ended with the same score after extra-time. The title was decided by a penalty shootout, which Atlético Mineiro won 4–3 to claim its first Copa Libertadores trophy. Jô was the top goalscorer in the competition with seven goals, and Victor was selected as the tournament's best goalkeeper. The team's victory also ensured awards for Atlético players at a continental level: Ronaldinho was named South American Footballer of the Year and selected for the continent's ideal team of 2013, along with Bernard, Réver, Marcos Rocha and Jô.

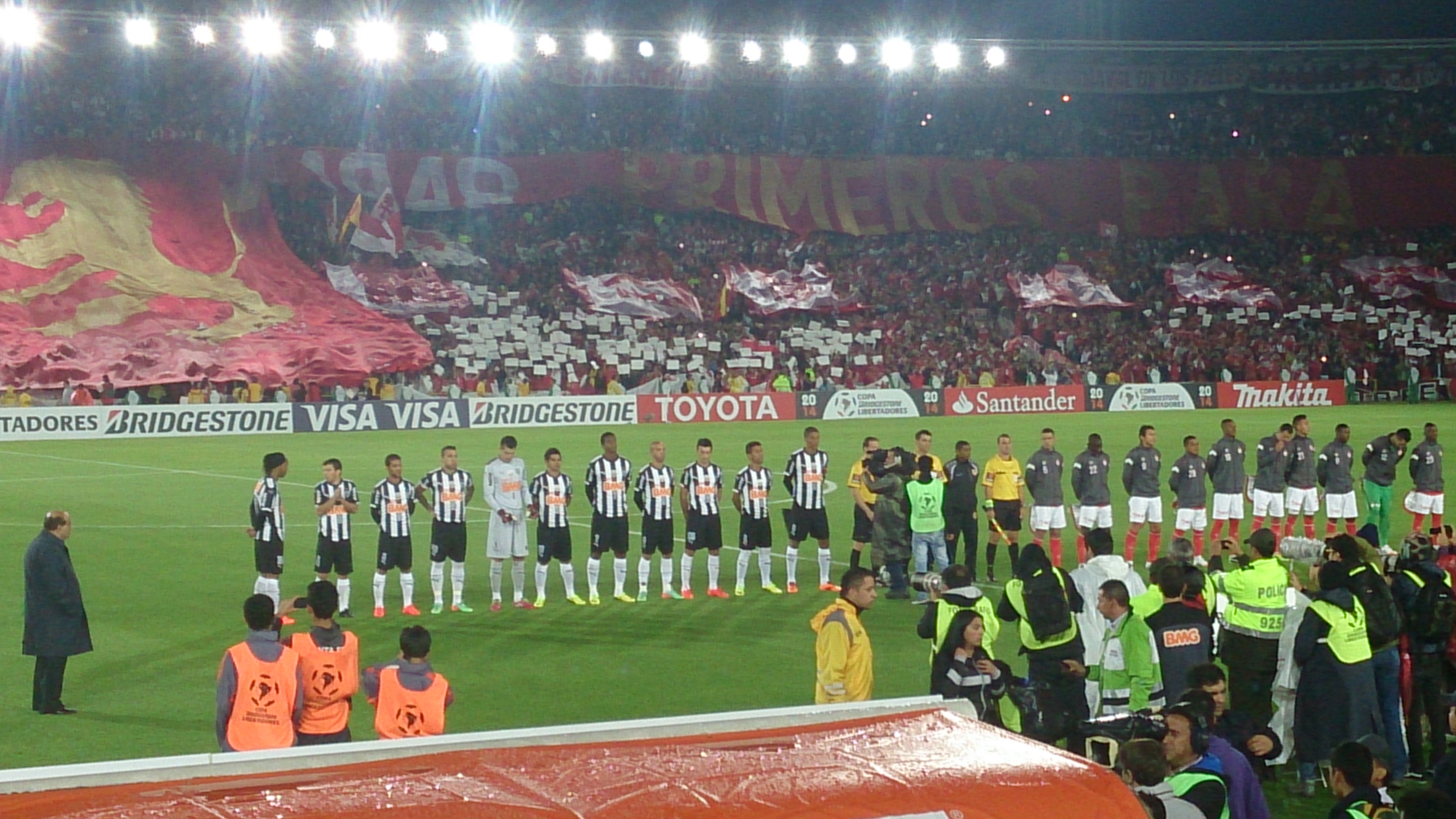
Atlético Mineiro and Santa Fe players lining up at El Campín in the 2014 Copa Libertadores

As winner of South America's main continental tournament, Atlético won the right to play in the 2013 FIFA Club World Cup in Morocco, its first official intercontinental competition. However, it was unsuccessful, as Atlético fell in the semi-finals to host club (as Moroccan champions) Raja Casablanca in a 3–1 loss. After the unexpected defeat, the team faced the Chinese club, and Asian champion, Guangzhou Evergrande in the third place match, which it won 3–2 with an injury time goal. The Copa Libertadores victory also ensured the club a berth in the 2014 edition of the competition. In that season, Atlético was drawn in Group 4, together with Paraguay's Nacional, Venezuela's Zamora, and Santa Fe. The team finished the group in first place, with three wins and three draws, and advanced to the knockout stages, where it faced Colombian club Atlético Nacional. Atlético Mineiro lost the first leg 1–0 in Medellín and scored 1–0 in the second leg at home, but a goal in the 87th minute by Atlético Nacional meant elimination. Atlético also took part in the 2014 Recopa Sudamericana its first appearance in the competition, contested between the champions of the Libertadores and the Sudamericana. The club again faced Lanús in a continental final, and won the first leg 1–0 in Argentina. Despite scoring first in the second leg at the Mineirão, Atlético suffered a comeback, and the aggregate score was 3–3 after 90 minutes. In extra-time, two own goals by Lanús players gave Atlético the title, with an aggregate score of 5–3.

Atlético qualified for the 2015 Copa Libertadores after winning the 2014 Copa do Brasil over rivals Cruzeiro. Unlike in previous years, the team struggled in the group stage, where it was drawn in Group 1 with Chilean side Colo-Colo, Mexico's Atlas, and Santa Fe again. Atlético qualified for the following stage in second place, and was eliminated in the round of 16 by Brazilian club Internacional, with a 2–2 draw in the first leg in Belo Horizonte and a 3–1 loss in Porto Alegre. The club qualified for the 2016 Copa Libertadores, after finishing as runner-up in the 2015 Campeonato Brasileiro Série A. Through its position in a new Copa Libertadores ranking introduced by CONMEBOL, Atlético was seeded in Pot 1 for the 2016 edition, and joined in Group 5 by Colo-Colo, Peruvian champions Melgar, and Ecuador's Independiente del Valle. After advancing as first in its group, the team eliminated Argentina's Racing in the round of 16, with a goalless draw at El Cilindro, and a 2–1 victory at home. Atlético fell to São Paulo in the quarter-finals on away goals, after losing 1–0 at the Morumbi, and winning 2–1 at the Independência. In the 2017 edition of Libertadores, Atlético Mineiro was drawn in group 6, facing Libertad, Godoy Cruz and Sport Boys. With 13 points, he was the overall leader of the tournament, earning the right to play the knockout games at home. However, right in the round of 16, Atlético stopped in Jorge Wilstermannsteam, in the aggregate score of 0–1. In 2018, Atlético returned to play in an edition of the Copa Sudamericana, but in the first phase, it fell to the San Lorenzo team in the aggregate score of 0–1. In 2019, the rooster competes again in Libertadores, this time the Minas Gerais team enters the second phase, defeating the Danubio (5–4) and eliminating another Uruguayan team in the third phase, this time Defensor Sporting (2–0) . In the group stage, Atlético fell into group E, along with Nacional, Cerro Porteño and Zamora. With a campaign of only 2 wins and 4 losses, the club was in third position and was relocated to the Copa Sudamericana. In the competition, he reached the semifinals, passing in the second phase by Union La Calera (1 (3)–(2) 1), Botafogo (3–0) in the round of 16, La Equidad (5–2) in the quarters, falling only to the Colón (3 (3)–(4) 3). In the 2020 edition, Atlético once again competes for the Sudamericana and is once again eliminated in the first phase, this time for Unión (2–3). In 2021, Atlético returns to Libertadores, where it fell in group H, alongside Cerro Porteño, América de Cali and Deportivo La Guaira. With 16 points accumulated, the team once again took the overall lead of the tournament, playing all the knockout stages at home. In the eighth and quarter finals, he passed Argentine rivals Boca Juniors (0 (3)–(1) 0) and River Plate (4–0), respectively. In the semifinals, they ended up being eliminated by Palmeiras by 1–1 on the scoreboard, giving the São Paulo team the advantage of the away goal.

Fixtures in international competitions (2013–2021)
Season	Competition	Round	Opposition	Home	Away	Agg./Pos.	Ref.
2013	Copa Libertadores	GS	(Brazil) São Paulo	2–1	0–2	1st	
2013	Copa Libertadores	GS	(Bolivia) The Strongest	2–1	2–1	1st	
2013	Copa Libertadores	GS	(Argentina) Arsenal de Sarandí	5–2	5–2	1st	
2013	Copa Libertadores	R16	(Brazil) São Paulo	4–1	2–1	6–2	
2013	Copa Libertadores	QF	(Mexico) Tijuana	1–1	2–2	3–3 (Note: Atlético Mineiro advanced on away goals.)	
2013	Copa Libertadores	SF	(Argentina) Newell's Old Boys	2–0	0–2	2–2 (Note: Atlético Mineiro 3–2 Newell's Old Boys, on penalties.)	
2013	Copa Libertadores	F	(Paraguay) Olimpia	2–0 (aet)	0–2	2–2 (Note: Atlético Mineiro 5–3 Olimpia, on penalties.)	
2013	FIFA Club World Cup	SF	(Morocco) Raja Casablanca	—N/a	—N/a	1–3	
2013	FIFA Club World Cup	3P	(China) Guangzhou Evergrande	—N/a	—N/a	3–2	
2014	Copa Libertadores	GS	(Paraguay) Nacional	1–1	2–2	1st	
2014	Copa Libertadores	GS	(Venezuela) Zamora	1–0	1–0	1st	
2014	Copa Libertadores	GS	(Colombia) Santa Fe	2–1	1–1	1st	
2014	Copa Libertadores	R16	(Colombia) Atlético Nacional	1–1	0–1	1–2	
2014	Recopa Sudamericana		(Argentina) Lanús	4–3 (aet)	1–0	5–3	
2015	Copa Libertadores	GS	(Colombia) Santa Fe	2–0	1–0	2nd	
2015	Copa Libertadores	GS	(Chile) Colo-Colo	2–0	0–2	2nd	
2015	Copa Libertadores	GS	(Mexico) Atlas	0–1	0–1	2nd	
2015	Copa Libertadores	R16	(Brazil) Internacional	2–2	1–3	3–5	
2016	Copa Libertadores	GS	(Chile) Colo-Colo	3–0	0–0	1st	
2016	Copa Libertadores	GS	(Ecuador) Independiente del Valle	1–0	2–3	1st	
2016	Copa Libertadores	GS	(Peru) Melgar	4–0	2–1	1st	
2016	Copa Libertadores	R16	(Argentina) Racing	2–1	0–0	2–1	
2016	Copa Libertadores	QF	(Brazil) São Paulo	2–1	0–1	2–2 (Note: São Paulo advanced on away goals.)	
2017	Copa Libertadores	GS	(Paraguay) Libertad	2–0	0–1	1st	–
2017	Copa Libertadores	GS	(Argentina) Godoy Cruz	4–1	1–1	1st	–
2017	Copa Libertadores	GS	(Bolivia) Sport Boys	5–2	5–1	1st	–
2017	Copa Libertadores	R16	(Bolivia) Jorge Wilstermann	0–1	0–0	0–1	–
2018	Copa Sudamericana	R1	(Argentina) San Lorenzo	0–1	0–0	0–1	–
2019	Copa Libertadores	R2	(Uruguay) Danubio	2–2	3–2	5–4	–
2019	Copa Libertadores	R3	(Uruguay) Defensor Sporting	2–0	0–0	2–0	–
2019	Copa Libertadores	GS	(Uruguay) Nacional	0–1	0–1	3rd	–
2019	Copa Libertadores	GS	(Paraguay) Cerro Porteño	0–1	1–4	3rd	–
2019	Copa Libertadores	GS	(Venezuela) Zamora	3–2	2–1	3rd	–
2019	Copa Sudamericana	R2	(Chile) Unión La Calera	0–1	1–0	1–1 (Note: Atlético Mineiro 3–0 Unión La Calera, on penalties.)	–
2019	Copa Sudamericana	R16	(Brazil) Botafogo	1–0	2–0	3–0	–
2019	Copa Sudamericana	QF	(Colombia) La Equidad	2–1	3–1	5–2	–
2019	Copa Sudamericana	SF	(Argentina) Colón	1–2	2–1	3–3 (Note: Atlético Mineiro 3–4 Colón, on penalties.)	–
2020	Copa Sudamericana	R1	(Argentina) Unión	0–3	2–0	2–3	–
2021	Copa Libertadores	GS	(Paraguay) Cerro Porteño	4–0	1–0	1st	–
2021	Copa Libertadores	GS	(Colombia) América de Cali	2–1	3–1	1st	–
2021	Copa Libertadores	GS	(Venezuela) Deportivo La Guaira	4–0	1–1	1st	–
2021	Copa Libertadores	R16	(Argentina) Boca Juniors	0–0	0–0	0–0 (Note: Atlético Mineiro 3–1 Boca Juniors, on penalties.)	–
2021	Copa Libertadores	QF	(Argentina) River Plate	1–0	3–0	4–0	–
2021	Copa Libertadores	SF	(Brazil) Palmeiras	0–0	1–1	1–1 (Note: Palmeiras advanced on away goals.)	–

=== In search of new glories (2022–) ===
After being crowned 2021 Campeonato Brasileiro Série A and the 2021 Copa do Brasil, Atlético Mineiro, started the 2022 Copa Libertadores, with a victory over the Colombians of Tolima. Following, the rooster drew with rivals América Mineiro at Mineirão and the Ecuadorians at Independiente del Valle, but won both in the return matches 2–1 and 3–1, respectively. In the last round, Atlético beat Tolima 2–1 at home and, with that, ended a sequence of 18 games without losing in the competition, but qualified first in the group. In the first game of the Round of 16, away from home, they reached a draw against Emelec from Ecuador, but on the way back, the Galo won 1–0, with a penalty goal from striker Hulk and qualified for the Quarter-finals. Against Palmeiras, in the first leg, at home, Atlético opened 2–0 on the scoreboard, but suffered a tie in stoppage time. In the return game, the game ended in a 0–0 tie and Palmeiras won 6–5 on penalties, eliminating Atlético Mineiro in Libertadores. In his debut in the 2023 Copa Libertadores edition, Atlético Mineiro drew 0–0 away from home with Carabobo and in the return game, they advanced to the third phase by beating them 3–1. In the third stage, they faced the Colombian team of Millonarios and after a 1–1 draw in the first leg, away from home, Atlético qualified for the group stage, after winning the second leg by 3–1. In the group stage, Atlético Mineiro faced Athletico Paranaense, where they lost away from home by 2–1 and won by the same score at home, Libertad, from Paraguay, where they lost at home by 1–0 and drew away from home in 1–1 and Alianza Lima, from Peru, where they won both games by 2–0 and 1–0, respectively. In the round of 16, Atlético was eliminated again by Palmeiras, after a 1–0 defeat at Mineirão and a 0–0 draw at Allianz Parque. In their debut in the 2024 Copa Libertadores edition, Atlético Mineiro won 4–1 away from home against the Caracas team. Soon after, they beat Rosario Central 2–1 in the Arena MRV debut in Copa Libertadores. In the third round, they beat Peñarol at home 3–2. In the following round, they beat Rosario Central in Argentina 1–0. Already classified, Atlético Mineiro lost to Peñarol in Uruguay 2–0. In the last round, Atlético beat Caracas 4–0 and secured 1st place in the group. In the round of 16, they faced the Argentine team San Lorenzo and won by an aggregate score of 2–1, after drawing 1–1 away in the first leg and winning at home in the second leg by 1–0. In the quarter-finals, Atlético beat Fluminense 2–1 on aggregate, after losing the first leg at Maracanã by 1–0 and winning the second leg at Arena MRV by 2–0. In the semi-finals, they eliminated River Plate on aggregate 3–0, after a home win by the same score and a 0–0 draw in the return leg, thus securing qualification for their second Libertadores final in history. In the grand final, Atlético lost the decision to Botafogo, 3–1, at the Estadio Monumental, in Buenos Aires, Argentina.

Fixtures in international competitions (2022–)
Season	Competition	Round	Opposition	Home	Away	Agg./Pos.	Ref.
2022	Copa Libertadores	GS	(Ecuador) Independiente del Valle	3–1	1–1	1st	–
2022	Copa Libertadores	GS	(Colombia) Tolima	1–2	2–0	1st	–
2022	Copa Libertadores	GS	(Brazil) América Mineiro	1–1	2–1	1st	–
2022	Copa Libertadores	R16	(Ecuador) Emelec	1–1	1–0	2–1	–
2022	Copa Libertadores	QF	(Brazil) Palmeiras	2–2	0–0	2–2 (Note: Atlético Mineiro 5–6 Palmeiras, on penalties.)	–
2023	Copa Libertadores	R2	(Venezuela) Carabobo	3–1	0–0	3–1	–
2023	Copa Libertadores	R3	(Colombia) Millonarios	3–1	1–1	4–2	–
2023	Copa Libertadores	GS	(Brazil) Athletico Paranaense	2–1	1–2	2nd	–
2023	Copa Libertadores	GS	(Paraguay) Libertad	0–1	1–1	2nd	–
2023	Copa Libertadores	GS	(Peru) Alianza Lima	2–0	1–0	2nd	–
2023	Copa Libertadores	R16	(Brazil) Palmeiras	0–1	0–0	0–1	–
2024	Copa Libertadores	GS	(Uruguay) Peñarol	3–2	0–2	1st	–
2024	Copa Libertadores	GS	(Argentina) Rosario Central	2–1	1–0	1st	–
2024	Copa Libertadores	GS	(Venezuela) Caracas	4–0	4–1	1st	–
2024	Copa Libertadores	R16	(Argentina) San Lorenzo	1–0	1–1	2–1	–
2024	Copa Libertadores	QF	(Brazil) Fluminense	2–0	0–1	2–1	–
2024	Copa Libertadores	SF	(Argentina) River Plate	3–0	0–0	3–0	–
2024	Copa Libertadores	F	(Brazil) Botafogo	—N/a	—N/a	1–3	–
2025	Copa Sudamericana	GS	(Venezuela) Caracas	3–1	1–1	2nd	–
2025	Copa Sudamericana	GS	(Peru) Cienciano	1–1	0–0	2nd	–
2025	Copa Sudamericana	GS	(Chile) Deportes Iquique	4–0	2–3	2nd	–
2025	Copa Sudamericana	KPO	(Colombia) Atlético Bucaramanga	0–1	1–0	1–1 (Note: Atlético Mineiro 3–1 Atlético Bucaramanga, on penalties.)	–
2025	Copa Sudamericana	R16	(Argentina) Godoy Cruz	2–1	1–0	3–1	–
2025	Copa Sudamericana	QF	(Bolivia) Bolívar	1–0	2–2	3–2	–
2025	Copa Sudamericana	SF	(Ecuador) Independiente del Valle	3–1	1–1	4–2	–
2025	Copa Sudamericana	F	(Argentina) Lanús	—N/a	—N/a	0–0 (aet) (Note: Atlético Mineiro 4–5 Lanús, on penalties.)	–
2026	Copa Sudamericana	GS	(Peru) Cienciano	2–0	0–1	1st	–
2026	Copa Sudamericana	GS	(Venezuela) Academia Puerto Cabello	1–0	1–2	1st	–
2026	Copa Sudamericana	GS	(Uruguay) Juventud	2–1	2–2	1st	–
2026	Copa Sudamericana	R16	(Brazil) Red Bull Bragantino	2–2	1–0	3–2	–
2026	Copa Sudamericana	QF	(Brazil) Santos	4–2	0–2	4–4 (Note: Atlético Mineiro 3–1 Santos, on penalties.)	–
2026	Copa Sudamericana	SF	(Uruguay) Montevideo City Torque	3–0	0–2	3–2	–
2026	Copa Sudamericana	F	(Argentina) Boca Juniors	—N/a	—N/a		–

== Records ==
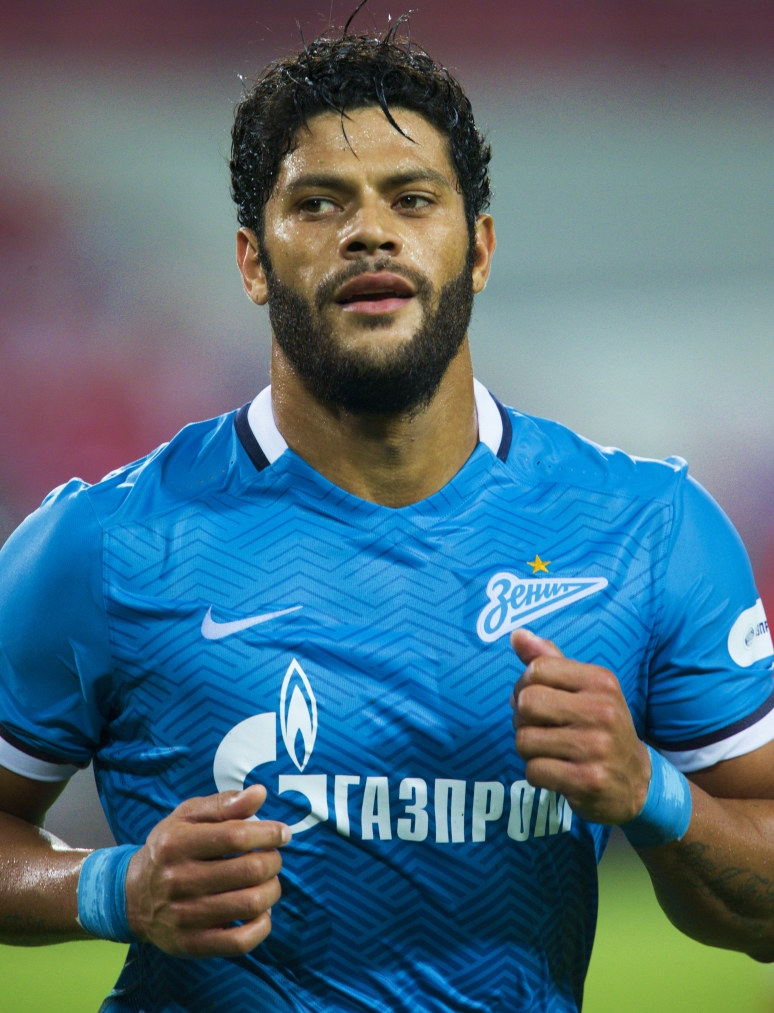
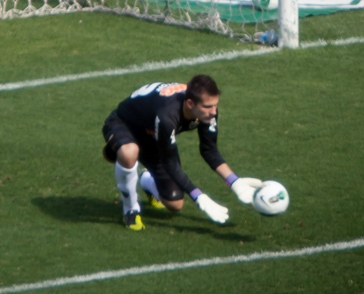
Hulk (left) and Victor (right) hold Atlético Mineiro's records for most goals and appearances in international competitions, respectively.

=== Team and players ===
- First match: Atlético Mineiro 2–2 São Paulo, Copa Libertadores, 30 January 1972
- First goal scored: Wanderley Paiva, against São Paulo
- Biggest home win:

- Atlético Mineiro 6–0 Mineros, Copa CONMEBOL, 14 November 1995
- Atlético Mineiro 6–0 Cobreloa, Copa Libertadores, 5 April 2000

- Biggest away win: Mineros 0–4 Atlético Mineiro, Copa CONMEBOL, 21 November 1995
- Biggest home defeat: Atlético Mineiro 2–5 Botafogo, Copa Sudamericana, 27 August 2008
- Biggest away defeat:

- Rosario Central 4–0 Atlético Mineiro, Copa CONMEBOL, 19 December 1995
- Bolívar 4–0 Atlético Mineiro, Copa Libertadores, 22 March 2000

- Highest home attendance: 60,116, against Olimpia in the 1992 Copa CONMEBOL
- Most appearances: Victor, 41
- Most goals scored: Hulk, 20

Key

- E = Entries
- P = Matches played
- W = Matches won
- D = Matches drawn
- L = Matches lost
- GF = Goals for
- GA = Goals against
- GD = Goal difference
- GS = Group stage
- PR = Preliminary round
- R1 = First round
- R2 = Second round
- R16 = Round of 16
- QF = Quarter-finals
- SF = Semi-finals

W	Winner
RU	Runner-up

=== By season ===
Clube Atlético Mineiro record in international club football by season
Season	Competition	P	W	D	L	GF	GA	GD	Round
1972	Copa Libertadores	6	0	4	2	5	6	−1	GS
1978	Copa Libertadores	10	5	2	3	19	14	+5	SF
1981	Copa Libertadores	7	2	5	0	8	6	+2	GS
1992	Copa CONMEBOL	8	4	1	3	15	7	+8	W
1993	Copa CONMEBOL	6	3	1	2	7	7	0	SF
1993	Copa de Oro	3	0	2	1	0	1	−1	RU
1995	Copa CONMEBOL	8	5	1	2	20	9	+11	RU
1996	Copa Master de CONMEBOL	2	0	1	1	0	3	−3	RU
1997	Copa CONMEBOL	8	5	3	0	18	5	+13	W
1998	Copa CONMEBOL	6	2	3	1	7	5	+2	SF
2000	Copa Libertadores	10	4	1	5	13	12	+1	QF
2000	Copa Mercosur	9	5	2	3	18	12	+6	SF
2003	Copa Sudamericana	2	1	0	1	2	2	0	PR
2004	Copa Sudamericana	2	0	1	1	3	5	−2	PR
2008	Copa Sudamericana	2	0	0	2	3	8	−5	R1
2009	Copa Sudamericana	2	0	2	0	2	2	0	R1
2010	Copa Sudamericana	6	2	2	2	4	4	0	QF
2011	Copa Sudamericana	2	0	0	2	1	3	−2	R2
2013	Copa Libertadores	14	9	2	3	29	18	+11	W
2013	FIFA Club World Cup	2	1	0	1	4	5	−1	SF
2014	Copa Libertadores	8	3	4	1	9	7	+2	R16
2014	Recopa Sudamericana	2	2	0	0	5	3	+2	W
2015	Copa Libertadores	8	3	1	4	8	9	−1	R16
2016	Copa Libertadores	10	6	2	2	16	7	+9	QF
2017	Copa Libertadores	8	4	2	2	17	7	+10	R16
2018	Copa Sudamericana	2	0	1	1	0	1	-1	R1
2019	Copa Libertadores	10	4	2	4	13	14	-1	GS
2019	Copa Sudamericana	8	6	0	2	12	6	+6	SF
2020	Copa Sudamericana	2	1	0	1	2	3	-1	R1
2021	Copa Libertadores	12	7	5	0	20	4	+16	SF
2022	Copa Libertadores	10	4	5	1	14	9	+5	QF
2023	Copa Libertadores	12	5	4	3	14	9	+5	R16
2024	Copa Libertadores	13	8	2	3	22	11	+11	RU
2025	Copa Sudamericana	15	7	6	2	22	12	+10	RU
2026	Copa Sudamericana	12	6	2	4	18	14	+4	TBD

=== By competition ===
Clube Atlético Mineiro record in international club football by competition
Competition	E	P	W	D	L	GF	GA	GD	W%	F	FW	FL
Copa Libertadores	14	138	64	41	33	207	133	+74	46.38	2	1	1
Copa CONMEBOL	5	36	19	9	8	67	33	+34	52.78	3	2	1
Copa de Oro	1	3	0	2	1	0	1	−1	0.00	1	0	1
Copa Master de CONMEBOL	1	2	0	1	1	0	3	−3	0.00	1	0	1
Copa Mercosur	1	10	5	2	3	18	18	+0	50.00	0	0	0
Copa Sudamericana	11	55	23	14	18	69	60	+9	41.82	0	0	0
Recopa Sudamericana	1	2	2	0	0	5	3	+2	100.00	1	1	0
FIFA Club World Cup	1	2	1	0	1	4	5	−1	50.00	0	0	0
Total	35	248	114	69	65	370	256	+114	45.97	8	4	4

=== By country ===
Clube Atlético Mineiro record in international club football by country
Country	P	W	D	L	GF	GA	GD	W%
Argentina	47	24	13	10	71	44	+27	51.06
Bolivia	12	8	2	2	22	13	+9	66.67
Brazil	69	21	24	24	81	89	−8	30.43
Chile	14	8	2	4	31	13	+18	57.14
China	1	1	0	0	3	2	+1	100.00
Colombia	24	14	5	5	39	20	+19	58.33
Ecuador	10	5	3	2	15	9	+6	50.00
Mexico	4	0	2	2	3	5	−2	0.00
Morocco	1	0	0	1	1	3	−2	0.00
Paraguay	22	5	9	8	20	22	−2	22.73
Peru	12	8	3	1	20	4	+16	66.67
Uruguay	16	7	4	5	23	20	+3	43.75
Venezuela	16	12	3	1	38	10	+28	75.00

=== Finals ===
Atlético Mineiro goals always listed first.

Year	Competition	Opposing Team	Score	Venue
1992	Copa CONMEBOL	(Paraguay) Olimpia	2–0	(Brazil) Mineirão, Belo Horizonte (first leg)
1992	Copa CONMEBOL	(Paraguay) Olimpia	0–1	(Paraguay) Defensores del Chaco, Asunción (second leg)
1993	Copa de Oro	(Argentina) Boca Juniors	0–0	(Brazil) Mineirão, Belo Horizonte (first leg)
1993	Copa de Oro	(Argentina) Boca Juniors	0–1	(Argentina) La Bombonera, Buenos Aires (second leg)
1995	Copa CONMEBOL	(Argentina) Rosario Central	4–0	(Brazil) Mineirão, Belo Horizonte (first leg)
1995	Copa CONMEBOL	(Argentina) Rosario Central	0–4 (3–4 p)	(Argentina) Gigante de Arroyito, Rosario (second leg)
1996	Copa Master de CONMEBOL	(Brazil) São Paulo	0–3	(Brazil) Verdão, Cuiabá
1997	Copa CONMEBOL	(Argentina) Lanús	4–1	(Argentina) La Fortaleza, Lanús (first leg)
1997	Copa CONMEBOL	(Argentina) Lanús	1–1	(Brazil) Mineirão, Belo Horizonte (second leg)
2013	Copa Libertadores	(Paraguay) Olimpia	0–2	(Paraguay) Defensores del Chaco, Asunción (first leg)
2013	Copa Libertadores	(Paraguay) Olimpia	2–0 (aet) (4–3 p)	(Brazil) Mineirão, Belo Horizonte (second leg)
2014	Recopa Sudamericana	(Argentina) Lanús	1–0	(Argentina) La Fortaleza, Lanús (first leg)
2014	Recopa Sudamericana	(Argentina) Lanús	4–3 (aet)	(Brazil) Mineirão, Belo Horizonte (second leg)
2024	Copa Libertadores	(Brazil) Botafogo	1–3	(Argentina) Estadio Más Monumental, Buenos Aires
2025	Copa Sudamericana	(Argentina) Lanús	0–0 (aet) (4–5 p)	(Paraguay) Defensores del Chaco, Asunción
2026	Copa Sudamericana	(Argentina) Boca Juniors		(Colombia) Estadio Metropolitano Roberto Meléndez, Barranquilla

== See also ==
- List of CONMEBOL club competition winners
- Historical table of the Copa Libertadores
- Historical table of the Copa Sudamericana
- Historical table of the FIFA Club World Cup
