= 1993 Copa de Oro Finals =

- Event: 1993 Copa de Oro
| Boca Juniors | Atlético Mineiro |
| (Argentina) | (Brazil) |
| 1 | 0 |

First leg
| Boca Juniors | Atlético Mineiro |
| 0 | 0 |
- Date: July 14, 1993
- Venue: Mineirao, Belo Horizonte
- Referee: Jorge Nieves (Uruguay)

Second leg
| Atlético Mineiro | Boca Juniors |
| 0 | 1 |
- Date: July 22, 1993
- Venue: La Bombonera, Buenos Aires
- Referee: Jorge Orellana (Ecuador)

The 1993 Copa de Oro Finals was a two-legged football series to decide the champion of the 1993 Copa de Oro organised by CONMEBOL. It was contested by Argentine side Boca Juniors and Brazilian Atlético Mineiro in July 1994.

Boca Juniors (as 1992 Copa Master champion) had previously eliminated São Paulo (1–0 on aggregate) while Atlético Mineiro (as 1992 Copa Conmebol champion) had beaten Cruzeiro on penalties on their road to the final.

The first leg was held in Mineirão Stadium in Belo Horizonte, where both teams tied 0–0. In the second leg, held in La Bombonera in Buenos Aires, Boca Juniors beat Atlético Mineiro 1–0 to claim their first Copa de Oro title.

== Qualified teams ==
| Team | Previous final app. |
|---|---|
| (Argentina) Boca Juniors | None |
| (Brazil) Atlético Mineiro | None |

== Venues ==
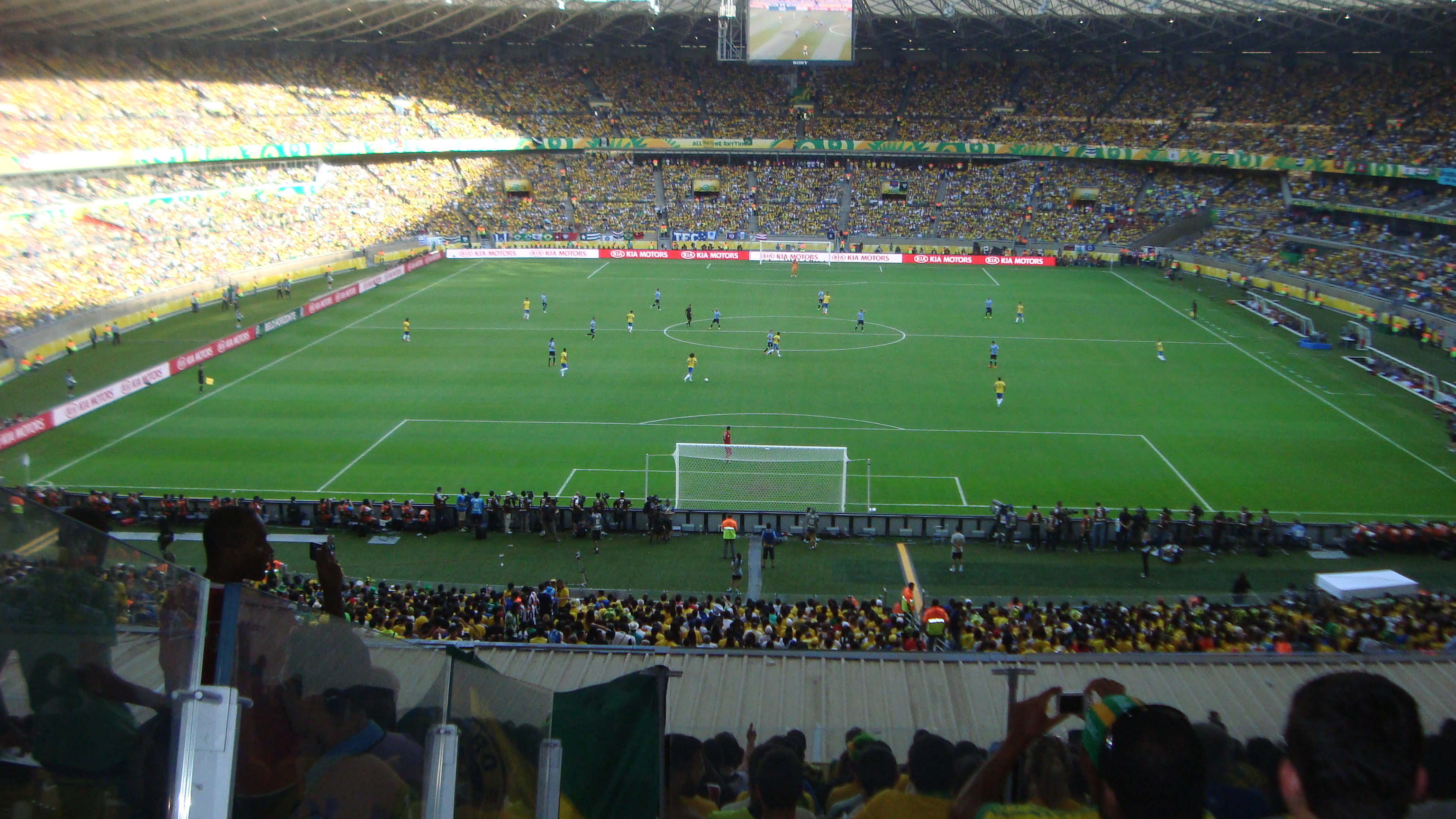
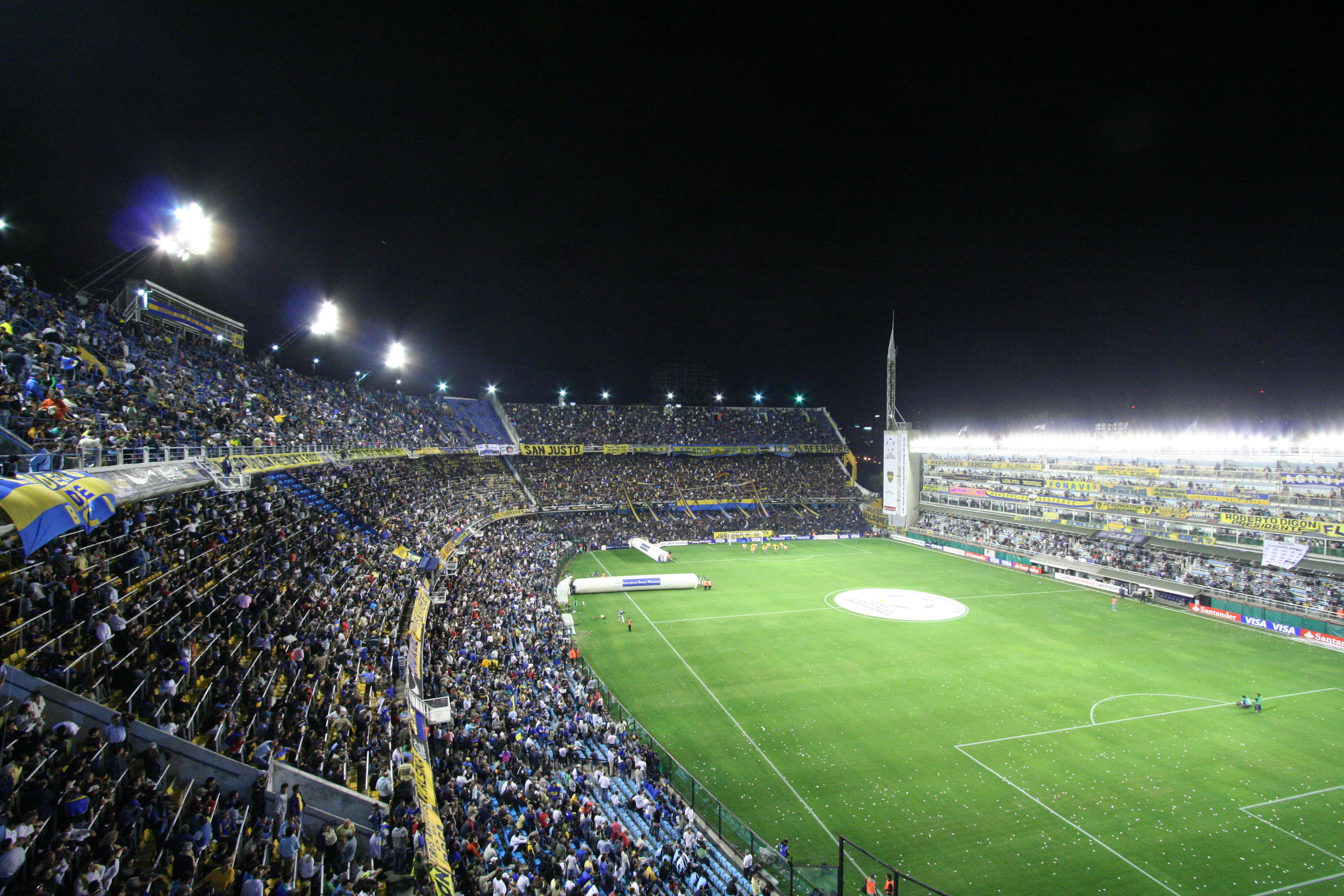
Mineirão (left) and La Bombonera, venues for the series

== Match details ==
=== First leg ===
1993 Copa de Oro Finals
July 14, 1993
First leg

| Atlético Mineiro (Brazil) | 0–0 | (Argentina) Boca Juniors |
|---|---|---|
| | Report |

Mineirão, Belo Horizonte
Referee: Jorge L. Nieves (Uruguay)

| Atl. Mineiro | Boca Juniors |

GK | 1 | (Brazil) Luis Enrique
DF | (Brazil) Luciano
DF | (Brazil) Orlando
DF | (Brazil) Ryuler
DF | (Brazil) Guto
MF | (Brazil) Carlos
MF | (Brazil) Valdir
MF | (Brazil) Wiver
MF | (Brazil) Vanderlei | (substituted off) 74'
FW | (Brazil) Reinaldo | (substituted off) 75'
FW | (Brazil) Ailton
Substitutes:
(Brazil) Toninho Pereira | (substituted on) 74'
(Brazil) Gilson | (substituted on) 75'
Manager:
(Brazil) Mussula

| GK | 1 | (Colombia) (Argentina) Carlos Navarro Montoya |
| DF | 4 | (Argentina) Diego Soñora |
| DF | 2 | (Argentina) Juan Simón |
| DF | 6 | (Argentina) Carlos Moya |
| DF | 3 | (Argentina) Carlos Mac Allister |
| MF | | (Argentina) Claudio L. Rodríguez | Booked |
| MF | 5 | (Argentina) Luis Medero |
| MF | | (Paraguay) Gustavo Neffa |
| MF | 10 | (Argentina) Carlos Tapia |
| FW | 7 | (Uruguay) Sergio Martínez |
| FW | 11 | (Argentina) Alberto Carranza |
Substitutes:
| GK | 12 | (Argentina) Esteban Pogany |
| DF | 13 | (Argentina) Alejandro Giuntini |
Manager:
(Argentina) Jorge Habbegger

=== Second leg ===
July 22, 1993
Second leg

| Boca Juniors (Argentina) | 1–0 | (Brazil) Atlético Mineiro |
|---|---|---|
| Mac Allister 54' | Report |

La Bombonera, Buenos Aires
Referee: Jorge Orellana (Ecuador)

| Boca Juniors | Atl. Mineiro |

| GK | 1 | (Colombia) (Argentina) Carlos Navarro Montoya |
| DF | 6 | (Argentina) Carlos Moya |
| DF | 2 | (Argentina) Juan Simón |
| MF | 13 | (Argentina) Alejandro Giuntini | Booked |
| DF | 3 | (Argentina) Carlos Mac Allister |
| DF | 4 | (Argentina) Diego Soñora |
| MF | 5 | (Argentina) Luis Medero |
| MF | 10 | (Argentina) Carlos Tapia | (substituted off) 42' |
| FW | 7 | (Uruguay) Sergio Martínez | (substituted off) 75' |
| FW | 15 | (Argentina) Sergio Saturno | Booked |
| FW | 11 | (Argentina) Alberto Carranza |
Substitutes:
| FW | 16 | (Argentina) Alberto Márcico | (substituted on) 42' (yellow card) |
| FW | 18 | (Argentina) Claudio L. Rodríguez | (substituted on) 75' |
| GK | 12 | (Argentina) Esteban Pogany |
| MF | 19 | (Argentina) Carlos Cenci |
| MF | 21 | (Argentina) Alejandro F. Farías |
Manager:
(Argentina) Jorge Habbegger

| GK | 1 | (Brazil) Luis Enrique |
| DF | 4 | (Brazil) Luciano | (substituted off) 8' |
| DF | 14 | (Brazil) Anderson |
| DF | 3 | (Brazil) Ryuler |
| MF | 6 | (Brazil) Paulo Roberto |
| DF | 8 | (Brazil) Carlos |
| MF | 5 | (Brazil) Valdir |
| MF | 10 | (Brazil) Reinaldo |
| MF | 17 | (Brazil) Vanderlei | (substituted off) 74' |
| FW | 9 | (Brazil) Ailton |
| FW | 11 | (Brazil) Wilver |
Substitutes:
| MF | 16 | (Brazil) Toninho Pereira | (substituted on) 8' |
| FW | 19 | (Brazil) Gilson | (substituted on) 74' |
| GK | 12 | (Brazil) Assis |
| | 7 | (Brazil) Bira |
| | 18 | (Brazil) Le |
Manager:
(Brazil) Mussula
