= Copa Oro =

Copa Oro may refer to:

In association football:

- CONCACAF Gold Cup, association football competition between nations from North and Central America and from the Caribbean
- CONCACAF W Championship, known as the CONCACAF Women's Gold Cup from 2000 to 2006, women's association football competition
- CONCACAF W Gold Cup, women's association football competition
- Copa de Oro (Spanish: Gold Cup), South American association football competition between the club winners of the Copa Libertadores de América, the Supercopa Sudamericana, the Copa CONMEBOL, and the Supercopa Masters
