= Luis Medero =

Argentine footballer and manager

Luis Adrián Medero
Personal information
- Full name: Luis Adrián Medero
- Date of birth: 24 January 1973 (age 53)
- Place of birth: Hurlingham, Buenos Aires, Argentina
- Height: 1.78 m (5 ft 10 in)
- Position: Defender

Senior career*
Years	Team	Apps	(Gls)
1992–1996	Boca Juniors	68	(1)
1996–2001	Colón	140	(4)
2001–2003	San Lorenzo	20	(0)
2003	Olimpo	-	
2004–2005	Argentinos Juniors	28	(0)
2005	Emelec	15	(0)
2006–2007	Gimnasia (J)	36	(0)
2007–2008	Almagro	-	

Managerial career
- 2009–2010: C.A.I (joint)
- 2011–2012: Boca Unidos (joint)
- 2012–2013: Patronato de Paraná (joint)
- * Club domestic league appearances and goals as of 2009

Luis Adrián Medero (born 24 January 1973 in Hurlingham, Buenos Aires) is a former Argentine football defender who works as the joint manager of C.A.I alongside Claudio Marini.

== Playing career ==
Medero started his career in 1992 with Argentine giants Boca Juniors, at the club he won two titles, the Apertura 1992 championship and the Copa Nicolas Leoz. He made a total of 84 appearances for the club in all competitions, scoring 1 goal.

In 1996, he was transferred to Colón de Santa Fe where he played for 5 years.

In 2001, he joined San Lorenzo de Almagro where he was part of the Copa Sudamericana winning team of 2002.

After leaving San Lorenzo Medero had stints with Olimpo de Bahía Blanca and Argentinos Juniors before joining Ecuadorian Club Sport Emelec in 2005, Gimnasia de Jujuy in 2006 and then Almagro in 2007.

== Coaching career ==
During the 2008–2009 Primera B Nacional season, Medero had his first coaching opportunity in a joint appointment with Claudio Marini at Comisión de Actividades Infantiles. During the duo's tenure, CAI was able to avoid relegation. In 2011, Medero and Marini became the coaches for Boca Unidos.

== Titles ==
Season	Club	Title
Apertura 1992	Boca Juniors	Primera Division Argentina
1993	Boca Juniors	Copa Nicolas Leoz
2002	San Lorenzo	Copa Sudamericana
