= 1993 Copa de Oro =

1993 Copa de Oro Nicolás Leoz 1993 Copa de Ouro Nicolás Leoz

Tournament details
- Dates: July 7 - July 22
- Teams: 4 (from 1 confederation)

Final positions
- Champions: (Argentina) Boca Juniors (1st title)
- Runners-up: (Brazil) Atlético Mineiro

Tournament statistics
- Matches played: 4
- Goals scored: 4 (1 per match)
- Top scorer: (Uruguay) Sergio Daniel Martínez (2 goals)

The 1993 Copa de Oro was the inaugural Copa de Oro, a football competition for the reigning champions of CONMEBOL's Copa Libertadores, the Supercopa Libertadores, the Copa CONMEBOL, and the Copa Master de Supercopa. It was played from 7 to 22 July.

This tournament was contested by São Paulo, winners of the 1992 Copa Libertadores, Cruzeiro, winners of the 1992 Supercopa Libertadores, Atlético Mineiro, winners of the 1992 Copa CONMEBOL, and Boca Juniors, winners of the 1992 Copa Master de Supercopa). Boca Juniors won the final 4–1 on points over Atlético Mineiro as Carlos Mac Allister scored the only goal of the two-legged final. Sergio Daniel Martínez, top scorer, scored the first goal of the tournament and also became the first person to score a golden goal in a CONMEBOL tournament.

== Qualified teams ==
Team	Honor
(Brazil) São Paulo	Winner of the 1992 Copa Libertadores
(Brazil) Cruzeiro	Winner of the 1992 Supercopa Libertadores
(Brazil) Atlético Mineiro	Winner of the 1992 Copa CONMEBOL
(Argentina) Boca Juniors	Winner of the 1992 Copa Master de Supercopa

== Knockout bracket ==
Semifinals
(Argentina) Boca Juniors	1	1	2
(Brazil) São Paulo	0	1	1
(Brazil) Atlético Mineiro (p)	0	-	0 (5)
(Brazil) Cruzeiro	0	-	0 (4)

Finals
(Argentina) Boca Juniors	0	1	1
(Brazil) Atlético Mineiro	0	0	0

== Semifinals ==
=== First leg ===
July 7, 1993

Boca Juniors (Argentina)	1–0	(Brazil) São Paulo
Martínez 87'

Estadio Camilo Cichero, Buenos Aires

July 8, 1993

Atlético Mineiro (Brazil)	0–0 (a.e.t.)	(Brazil) Cruzeiro
Penalties
	5–4

Mineirão, Belo Horizonte

=== Second leg ===
July 10, 1993

São Paulo (Brazil)	1–1 (a.e.t.)	(Argentina) Boca Juniors
Matosas 73'		Martínez 91'

Estádio do Pacaembu, São Paulo

== Finals ==
=== First leg ===
July 14, 1993

Atlético Mineiro (Brazil)	0–0	(Argentina) Boca Juniors

Mineirão, Belo Horizonte

=== Second leg ===
July 22, 1993

Boca Juniors (Argentina)	1–0	(Brazil) Atlético Mineiro
Mac Allister 54'

La Bombonera, Buenos Aires

== Top goalscorers ==
2 goals

- (Uruguay) Sergio Daniel Martínez

1 goal

- (Argentina) Carlos Mac Allister
- (Argentina) (Uruguay) Gustavo Matosas
