= Historical table of the Copa Sudamericana =

The Historical Table of the Copa Sudamericana is a record of statistics of every team that has played in the Copa Sudamericana since its inception in 2002, up to the 2022 season. The list is ordered according to the most points each team has accumulated.

| Pos | Club | Country | Part | Titles | Pld | W | D | L | GF | GC | GD | Pts |
|---|---|---|---|---|---|---|---|---|---|---|---|---|
| 1 | Independiente | Argentina | 11 | 2 | 70 | 34 | 19 | 17 | 97 | 72 | +25 | 121 |
| 2 | LDU Quito | Ecuador | 12 | 1 | 72 | 34 | 13 | 25 | 109 | 85 | +24 | 115 |
| 3 | Libertad | Paraguay | 14 | 0 | 72 | 33 | 12 | 27 | 85 | 74 | +11 | 111 |
| 4 | Atlético Nacional | Colombia | 9 | 0 | 62 | 30 | 17 | 15 | 81 | 57 | +24 | 107 |
| 5 | Lanús | Argentina | 12 | 1 | 61 | 29 | 15 | 17 | 90 | 65 | +25 | 102 |
| 5 | Athletico Paranaense | Brazil | 8 | 2 | 49 | 28 | 8 | 13 | 71 | 42 | +29 | 92 |
| 6 | São Paulo | Brazil | 12 | 1 | 58 | 24 | 20 | 14 | 81 | 56 | +25 | 92 |
| 8 | Fluminense | Brazil | 9 | 0 | 54 | 25 | 16 | 13 | 73 | 50 | +23 | 91 |
| 9 | Cerro Porteño | Paraguay | 10 | 0 | 60 | 25 | 15 | 20 | 89 | 69 | +20 | 90 |
| 10 | San Lorenzo | Argentina | 11 | 1 | 54 | 26 | 10 | 18 | 76 | 47 | +29 | 88 |
| 11 | Emelec | Ecuador | 10 | 0 | 50 | 25 | 10 | 15 | 78 | 57 | +21 | 85 |
| 12 | Universidad Católica | Chile | 11 | 0 | 58 | 23 | 16 | 19 | 84 | 75 | +9 | 85 |
| 13 | River Plate | Argentina | 11 | 1 | 50 | 19 | 16 | 15 | 64 | 47 | +17 | 73 |
| 14 | Junior | Colombia | 7 | 0 | 44 | 20 | 12 | 12 | 53 | 39 | +14 | 72 |
| 15 | Arsenal | Argentina | 7 | 1 | 40 | 17 | 13 | 10 | 58 | 41 | +17 | 64 |
| 16 | Peñarol | Uruguay | 9 | 0 | 40 | 18 | 10 | 12 | 60 | 44 | +16 | 64 |
| 17 | River Plate | Uruguay | 8 | 0 | 38 | 19 | 7 | 12 | 49 | 41 | +8 | 64 |
| 17 | Bolivar | Bolivia | 12 | 0 | 48 | 18 | 10 | 20 | 67 | 71 | -4 | 64 |
| 18 | Universidad de Chile | Chile | 7 | 1 | 34 | 18 | 7 | 9 | 47 | 34 | +13 | 61 |
| 19 | Botafogo | Brazil | 8 | 0 | 36 | 18 | 6 | 12 | 57 | 45 | +12 | 60 |
| 20 | Boca Juniors | Argentina | 10 | 2 | 42 | 14 | 15 | 13 | 55 | 44 | +11 | 57 |
| 21 | Santa Fe | Colombia | 6 | 1 | 40 | 13 | 18 | 9 | 41 | 31 | +10 | 57 |
| 22 | Vélez Sársfield | Argentina | 8 | 0 | 42 | 15 | 11 | 16 | 50 | 49 | +1 | 56 |
| 23 | Corinthians | Brazil | 7 | 0 | 36 | 14 | 13 | 9 | 47 | 37 | +10 | 55 |
| 24 | Nacional | Uruguay | 8 | 0 | 36 | 16 | 6 | 14 | 42 | 38 | +4 | 54 |
| 25 | Internacional | Brazil | 6 | 1 | 32 | 13 | 14 | 5 | 41 | 29 | +12 | 53 |
| 26 | Bahia | Brazil | 8 | 0 | 36 | 15 | 7 | 14 | 45 | 34 | +11 | 52 |
| 28 | Millonarios | Colombia | 6 | 0 | 32 | 12 | 11 | 9 | 41 | 30 | +11 | 47 |
| 29 | Barcelona | Ecuador | 9 | 0 | 32 | 12 | 10 | 10 | 41 | 36 | +5 | 46 |
| 29 | Colo-Colo | Chile | 5 | 0 | 26 | 13 | 6 | 7 | 42 | 24 | +18 | 45 |
| 29 | Melgar | Peru | 6 | 0 | 26 | 14 | 3 | 9 | 33 | 35 | -2 | 45 |
| 30 | Deportivo Cali | Colombia | 10 | 0 | 36 | 12 | 9 | 15 | 40 | 34 | -3 | 45 |
| 31 | Defensor Sporting | Uruguay | 7 | 0 | 34 | 11 | 11 | 12 | 51 | 40 | +11 | 44 |
| 32 | Deportes Tolima | Colombia | 9 | 0 | 38 | 9 | 17 | 12 | 35 | 35 | 0 | 44 |
| 33 | Colón | Argentina | 4 | 0 | 25 | 13 | 3 | 9 | 38 | 23 | +15 | 42 |
| 34 | Estudiantes | Argentina | 8 | 0 | 30 | 12 | 6 | 12 | 29 | 31 | -2 | 42 |
| 35 | Defensa y Justicia | Argentina | 4 | 1 | 23 | 11 | 6 | 6 | 28 | 18 | +10 | 39 |
| 36 | Santos | Brazil | 7 | 0 | 28 | 10 | 9 | 9 | 31 | 29 | +2 | 39 |
| 37 | Goiás | Brazil | 8 | 0 | 32 | 10 | 9 | 13 | 37 | 39 | -2 | 39 |
| 38 | Grêmio | Brazil | 6 | 0 | 11 | 5 | 6 | 5 | 38 | 28 | +10 | 38 |
| 39 | Vasco da Gama | Brazil | 7 | 0 | 28 | 11 | 5 | 12 | 39 | 38 | +1 | 38 |
| 40 | La Equidad | Colombia | 7 | 0 | 32 | 10 | 8 | 14 | 31 | 36 | -5 | 38 |
| 41 | Flamengo | Brazil | 6 | 0 | 24 | 10 | 7 | 7 | 37 | 30 | +7 | 37 |
| 43 | El Nacional | Ecuador | 5 | 0 | 20 | 11 | 3 | 6 | 31 | 24 | +7 | 36 |
| 44 | Atlético Mineiro | Brazil | 9 | 0 | 28 | 10 | 6 | 12 | 29 | 34 | -5 | 36 |
| 45 | Sportivo Luqueño | Paraguay | 5 | 0 | 22 | 9 | 8 | 5 | 31 | 21 | +10 | 35 |
| 46 | Cienciano | Peru | 4 | 1 | 20 | 10 | 5 | 5 | 30 | 24 | +6 | 35 |
| 47 | Racing | Argentina | 6 | 0 | 24 | 9 | 7 | 8 | 25 | 25 | 0 | 34 |
| 47 | Independiente del Valle | Ecuador | 4 | 1 | 21 | 9 | 6 | 6 | 28 | 21 | +7 | 33 |
| 48 | Montevideo Wanderers | Uruguay | 4 | 0 | 22 | 8 | 9 | 5 | 17 | 15 | +2 | 33 |
| 48 | Olimpia | Paraguay | 6 | 0 | 24 | 8 | 9 | 7 | 28 | 27 | +1 | 33 |
| 49 | Huachipato | Chile | 5 | 0 | 22 | 10 | 3 | 9 | 25 | 29 | -4 | 33 |
| 50 | Nacional | Paraguay | 8 | 0 | 30 | 7 | 12 | 11 | 22 | 34 | -12 | 33 |
| 51 | Palmeiras | Brazil | 5 | 0 | 22 | 10 | 2 | 10 | 26 | 26 | 0 | 32 |
| 52 | Águilas Doradas | Colombia | 5 | 0 | 20 | 8 | 7 | 5 | 24 | 20 | +4 | 31 |
| 54 | Sport Huancayo | Peru | 8 | 0 | 30 | 7 | 8 | 15 | 28 | 55 | -27 | 29 |
| 55 | Red Bull Bragantino | Brazil | 1 | 0 | 13 | 9 | 1 | 3 | 20 | 12 | +8 | 28 |
| 56 | Liverpool | Uruguay | 6 | 0 | 20 | 8 | 4 | 8 | 21 | 18 | +3 | 28 |
| 57 | Ponte Preta | Brazil | 3 | 0 | 18 | 7 | 7 | 4 | 19 | 16 | +3 | 28 |
| 58 | Deportivo Quito | Ecuador | 4 | 0 | 14 | 9 | 1 | 4 | 22 | 20 | +2 | 28 |
| 59 | Mineros de Guayana | Venezuela | 8 | 0 | 22 | 7 | 7 | 8 | 27 | 29 | -2 | 28 |
| 60 | Argentinos Juniors | Argentina | 6 | 0 | 22 | 7 | 7 | 8 | 17 | 19 | -2 | 28 |
| 61 | Sol de América | Paraguay | 6 | 0 | 24 | 7 | 6 | 11 | 24 | 30 | -6 | 27 |
| 62 | Universidad Católica | Ecuador | 6 | 0 | 20 | 7 | 5 | 8 | 24 | 22 | +2 | 26 |
| 63 | Chapecoense | Brazil | 4 | 1 | 20 | 5 | 10 | 5 | 18 | 17 | +1 | 25 |
| 64 | The Strongest | Bolivia | 4 | 0 | 16 | 7 | 4 | 5 | 23 | 23 | 0 | 25 |
| 65 | Huracán | Argentina | 3 | 0 | 16 | 6 | 6 | 4 | 20 | 19 | +1 | 24 |
| 66 | Palestino | Chile | 4 | 0 | 22 | 7 | 3 | 12 | 18 | 30 | -12 | 24 |
| 67 | LDU Loja | Ecuador | 3 | 0 | 14 | 6 | 5 | 3 | 15 | 12 | +3 | 23 |
| 68 | Rosario Central | Argentina | 5 | 0 | 20 | 5 | 8 | 7 | 20 | 19 | +1 | 23 |
| 69 | Guaraní | Paraguay | 6 | 0 | 18 | 6 | 5 | 7 | 20 | 21 | -1 | 23 |
| 70 | Cruzeiro | Brazil | 6 | 0 | 16 | 7 | 2 | 7 | 18 | 20 | -2 | 20 |
| 71 | Caracas | Venezuela | 6 | 0 | 20 | 6 | 5 | 9 | 18 | 22 | -4 | 23 |
| 73 | Pachuca | Mexico | 2 | 1 | 10 | 6 | 2 | 2 | 22 | 12 | +10 | 20 |
| 74 | Newell's Old Boys | Argentina | 4 | 0 | 16 | 5 | 5 | 6 | 16 | 15 | +1 | 20 |
| 75 | Vitória | Brazil | 5 | 0 | 14 | 6 | 2 | 6 | 14 | 17 | -3 | 20 |
| 76 | Banfield | Argentina | 6 | 0 | 18 | 5 | 5 | 8 | 18 | 23 | -4 | 20 |
| 77 | Universitario | Peru | 7 | 0 | 20 | 5 | 5 | 10 | 20 | 28 | -8 | 20 |
| 78 | Oriente Petrolero | Bolivia | 8 | 0 | 20 | 4 | 8 | 8 | 16 | 18 | -2 | 20 |
| 79 | América | Mexico | 2 | 0 | 12 | 6 | 1 | 5 | 22 | 18 | +4 | 19 |
| 80 | Metropolitanos | Venezuela | 2 | 0 | 16 | 5 | 4 | 7 | 17 | 16 | +1 | 19 |
| 81 | Aucas | Ecuador | 5 | 0 | 16 | 6 | 1 | 9 | 18 | 21 | -3 | 19 |
| 82 | Tigre | Argentina | 3 | 0 | 14 | 5 | 3 | 6 | 19 | 18 | +1 | 18 |
| 83 | Sport Recife | Brazil | 5 | 0 | 20 | 5 | 3 | 12 | 18 | 25 | -7 | 18 |
| 84 | Coquimbo Unido | Chile | 1 | 0 | 10 | 5 | 2 | 3 | 14 | 7 | +7 | 17 |
| 85 | Coritiba | Brazil | 5 | 0 | 16 | 5 | 2 | 9 | 17 | 22 | -5 | 17 |
| 86 | Sporting Cristal | Peru | 3 | 0 | 10 | 5 | 1 | 4 | 17 | 14 | +3 | 16 |
| 87 | Deportivo Pasto | Colombia | 4 | 0 | 12 | 5 | 1 | 6 | 10 | 11 | -1 | 16 |
| 88 | River Plate | Paraguay | 2 | 0 | 10 | 5 | 1 | 4 | 14 | 18 | -4 | 16 |
| 89 | Guadalajara | Mexico | 2 | 0 | 12 | 4 | 4 | 4 | 16 | 21 | -5 | 16 |
| 90 | América de Cali | Colombia | 5 | 0 | 14 | 5 | 1 | 8 | 14 | 20 | -6 | 16 |
| 90 | Jorge Wilstermann | Bolivia | 5 | 0 | 16 | 3 | 7 | 6 | 16 | 27 | -11 | 16 |
| 91 | Danubio | Uruguay | 10 | 0 | 20 | 3 | 7 | 10 | 22 | 34 | -12 | 16 |
| 92 | Montevideo City Torque | Uruguay | 1 | 0 | 8 | 4 | 3 | 1 | 17 | 7 | -10 | 15 |
| 93 | Atlético Goianiense | Brazil | 2 | 0 | 10 | 3 | 6 | 1 | 9 | 7 | +2 | 15 |
| 94 | Zulia | Venezuela | 1 | 0 | 8 | 5 | 0 | 3 | 8 | 9 | -1 | 15 |
| 95 | Independiente Medellín | Colombia | 4 | 0 | 14 | 4 | 3 | 7 | 16 | 21 | -5 | 15 |
| 96 | Nacional Potosí | Bolivia | 6 | 0 | 14 | 5 | 0 | 9 | 12 | 21 | -9 | 15 |
| 97 | Universitario de Sucre | Bolivia | 4 | 0 | 16 | 4 | 3 | 9 | 19 | 29 | -10 | 15 |
| 98 | Gimnasia y Esgrima | Argentina | 4 | 0 | 12 | 3 | 5 | 4 | 11 | 14 | -3 | 14 |
| 99 | Deportivo La Guaira | Venezuela | 3 | 0 | 12 | 3 | 5 | 4 | 10 | 14 | -4 | 14 |
| 100 | Alianza Lima | Peru | 4 | 0 | 12 | 4 | 2 | 6 | 6 | 11 | -5 | 14 |
| 101 | Audax Italiano | Chile | 3 | 0 | 10 | 3 | 4 | 3 | 11 | 11 | 0 | 13 |
| 102 | Fénix | Uruguay | 4 | 0 | 12 | 3 | 4 | 5 | 9 | 14 | -5 | 13 |
| 104 | Alianza Atlético | Peru | 3 | 0 | 12 | 3 | 4 | 5 | 14 | 22 | -8 | 13 |
| 105 | Deportivo Anzoátegui | Venezuela | 7 | 0 | 16 | 3 | 4 | 9 | 13 | 23 | -10 | 13 |
| 106 | UNAM | Mexico | 1 | 0 | 8 | 3 | 3 | 2 | 14 | 7 | +7 | 12 |
| 107 | Ceará | Brazil | 2 | 0 | 8 | 3 | 3 | 2 | 7 | 6 | +1 | 12 |
| 108 | Unión La Calera | Chile | 2 | 0 | 10 | 2 | 6 | 2 | 7 | 7 | 0 | 12 |
| 109 | General Díaz | Paraguay | 2 | 0 | 8 | 3 | 3 | 2 | 10 | 12 | -2 | 12 |
| 110 | Coronel Bolognesi | Peru | 3 | 0 | 8 | 4 | 0 | 4 | 8 | 10 | -2 | 12 |
| 111 | Universidad César Vallejo | Peru | 3 | 0 | 12 | 3 | 3 | 6 | 14 | 17 | -3 | 12 |
| 112 | Guabirá | Bolivia | 4 | 0 | 14 | 4 | 0 | 10 | 15 | 33 | -18 | 12 |
| 113 | Deportivo Capiatá | Paraguay | 1 | 0 | 6 | 3 | 2 | 1 | 10 | 6 | +4 | 11 |
| 114 | São Caetano | Brazil | 2 | 0 | 8 | 2 | 5 | 1 | 11 | 8 | +3 | 11 |
| 115 | Cobreloa | Chile | 3 | 0 | 10 | 2 | 5 | 3 | 11 | 11 | 0 | 11 |
| 116 | Unión Española | Chile | 4 | 0 | 12 | 2 | 5 | 5 | 11 | 20 | -9 | 11 |
| 117 | Aurora | Bolivia | 4 | 0 | 12 | 3 | 2 | 7 | 20 | 30 | -10 | 11 |
| 118 | Real Potosí | Bolivia | 4 | 0 | 10 | 3 | 2 | 5 | 12 | 23 | -11 | 11 |
| 119 | Blooming | Bolivia | 7 | 0 | 16 | 3 | 2 | 11 | 8 | 31 | -23 | 11 |
| 120 | Macará | Ecuador | 2 | 0 | 6 | 3 | 1 | 2 | 10 | 8 | +2 | 10 |
| 119 | Atlético Tucumán | Argentina | 2 | 0 | 6 | 3 | 1 | 2 | 8 | 6 | +2 | 10 |
| 120 | Cerro | Uruguay | 2 | 0 | 8 | 2 | 4 | 2 | 7 | 6 | +1 | 10 |
| 121 | Unión | Argentina | 2 | 0 | 8 | 3 | 1 | 4 | 7 | 7 | 0 | 10 |
| 122 | Deportes Temuco | Chile | 1 | 0 | 4 | 3 | 1 | 0 | 4 | 4 | -1 | 10 |
| 123 | Boston River | Uruguay | 2 | 0 | 8 | 3 | 1 | 4 | 11 | 12 | -1 | 10 |
| 124 | Santiago Wanderers | Chile | 3 | 0 | 8 | 3 | 1 | 4 | 8 | 9 | -1 | 10 |
| 126 | Universidad de Concepción | Chile | 3 | 0 | 8 | 3 | 1 | 4 | 9 | 13 | -4 | 10 |
| 127 | Belgrano | Argentina | 3 | 0 | 8 | 3 | 1 | 4 | 8 | 12 | -4 | 10 |
| 128 | Universidad San Martín | Peru | 3 | 0 | 8 | 3 | 1 | 4 | 10 | 15 | -5 | 10 |
| 129 | Figueirense | Brazil | 4 | 0 | 8 | 1 | 6 | 1 | 11 | 11 | 0 | 9 |
| 130 | Toluca | Mexico | 1 | 0 | 6 | 3 | 0 | 3 | 7 | 7 | 0 | 9 |
| 131 | Cuiabá | Brazil | 2 | 0 | 8 | 3 | 0 | 5 | 9 | 13 | -4 | 9 |
| 131 | San José | Bolivia | 4 | 0 | 10 | 2 | 3 | 5 | 13 | 18 | -5 | 9 |
| 132 | Monagas | Venezuela | 4 | 0 | 10 | 3 | 0 | 7 | 12 | 20 | -8 | 9 |
| 133 | Trujillanos | Venezuela | 5 | 0 | 12 | 2 | 3 | 7 | 10 | 22 | -12 | 9 |
| 135 | Talleres | Argentina | 1 | 0 | 6 | 2 | 2 | 2 | 7 | 5 | +2 | 8 |
| 136 | 12 de Octubre | Paraguay | 1 | 0 | 8 | 1 | 5 | 2 | 3 | 5 | -2 | 8 |
| 138 | Aragua | Venezuela | 3 | 0 | 12 | 2 | 2 | 8 | 9 | 27 | -18 | 8 |
| 139 | Avaí | Brazil | 1 | 0 | 6 | 2 | 1 | 3 | 9 | 8 | +1 | 7 |
| 140 | Santa Cruz | Brazil | 1 | 0 | 4 | 2 | 1 | 1 | 4 | 3 | +1 | 7 |
| 141 | Plaza Colonia | Uruguay | 2 | 0 | 6 | 2 | 1 | 3 | 4 | 3 | +1 | 7 |
| 142 | Cusco | Peru | 3 | 0 | 6 | 2 | 1 | 3 | 6 | 8 | -2 | 7 |
| 143 | Deportivo Cuenca | Ecuador | 2 | 0 | 8 | 1 | 4 | 3 | 8 | 12 | -4 | 7 |
| 144 | Deportes Iquique | Chile | 3 | 0 | 6 | 2 | 1 | 3 | 4 | 8 | -4 | 7 |
| 145 | Deportivo Italchacao | Venezuela | 2 | 0 | 6 | 2 | 1 | 3 | 4 | 11 | -7 | 7 |
| 146 | San Luis | Mexico | 1 | 0 | 4 | 2 | 0 | 2 | 7 | 7 | 0 | 6 |
| 147 | Everton | Chile | 1 | 0 | 4 | 2 | 0 | 2 | 3 | 3 | 0 | 6 |
| 148 | Olmedo | Ecuador | 1 | 0 | 4 | 2 | 0 | 2 | 3 | 4 | -1 | 6 |
| 149 | Royal Pari | Bolivia | 2 | 0 | 8 | 2 | 0 | 6 | 10 | 16 | -6 | 6 |
| 150 | O'Higgins | Chile | 3 | 0 | 6 | 1 | 3 | 2 | 4 | 9 | -5 | 6 |
| 151 | Zamora | Venezuela | 6 | 0 | 14 | 1 | 3 | 10 | 6 | 19 | -13 | 6 |
| 152 | Carabobo | Venezuela | 4 | 0 | 10 | 1 | 3 | 6 | 5 | 19 | -14 | 6 |
| 153 | Juventud | Uruguay | 1 | 0 | 4 | 1 | 2 | 1 | 4 | 3 | +1 | 5 |
| 154 | Envigado | Colombia | 1 | 0 | 4 | 1 | 2 | 1 | 3 | 2 | +1 | 5 |
| 155 | Brasília | Brazil | 1 | 0 | 4 | 1 | 2 | 1 | 2 | 1 | +1 | 5 |
| 156 | Atlético Huila | Colombia | 1 | 0 | 4 | 1 | 2 | 1 | 6 | 7 | -1 | 5 |
| 157 | Unión San Felipe | Chile | 1 | 0 | 4 | 1 | 2 | 1 | 7 | 10 | -3 | 5 |
| 158 | UTC | Peru | 4 | 0 | 8 | 1 | 2 | 5 | 4 | 16 | -12 | 5 |
| 159 | Deportivo Lara | Venezuela | 5 | 0 | 10 | 1 | 2 | 7 | 6 | 19 | -13 | 5 |
| 160 | Sport Ancash | Peru | 1 | 0 | 4 | 1 | 1 | 2 | 4 | 2 | +2 | 4 |
| 161 | Rampla Juniors | Uruguay | 1 | 0 | 4 | 1 | 1 | 2 | 4 | 4 | 0 | 4 |
| 162 | Fuerza Amarilla | Ecuador | 1 | 0 | 4 | 1 | 1 | 2 | 3 | 3 | 0 | 4 |
| 163 | D.C. United | United States | 1 | 0 | 4 | 1 | 1 | 2 | 5 | 6 | -1 | 4 |
| 164 | Deportivo Santaní | Paraguay | 1 | 0 | 4 | 1 | 1 | 2 | 4 | 5 | -1 | 4 |
| 165 | Criciúma | Brazil | 2 | 0 | 4 | 1 | 1 | 2 | 3 | 5 | -2 | 4 |
| 166 | Patriotas | Colombia | 1 | 0 | 4 | 1 | 1 | 2 | 2 | 4 | -2 | 4 |
| 167 | Godoy Cruz | Argentina | 2 | 0 | 6 | 0 | 4 | 2 | 4 | 7 | -3 | 4 |
| 168 | Tacuary | Paraguay | 2 | 0 | 6 | 0 | 4 | 2 | 5 | 9 | -4 | 4 |
| 169 | Ñublense | Chile | 2 | 0 | 4 | 1 | 1 | 2 | 2 | 6 | -4 | 4 |
| 170 | Estudiantes de Mérida | Venezuela | 4 | 0 | 8 | 1 | 1 | 6 | 2 | 16 | -14 | 4 |
| 171 | Provincial Osorno | Chile | 1 | 0 | 2 | 1 | 0 | 1 | 2 | 2 | 0 | 3 |
| 172 | Fortaleza | Brazil | 1 | 0 | 2 | 1 | 0 | 1 | 2 | 2 | 0 | 3 |
| 173 | Náutico | Brazil | 1 | 0 | 2 | 1 | 0 | 1 | 2 | 2 | 0 | 3 |
| 174 | Atlético Venezuela | Venezuela | 1 | 0 | 2 | 1 | 0 | 1 | 1 | 1 | 0 | 3 |
| 175 | Sport Boys | Peru | 1 | 0 | 2 | 1 | 0 | 1 | 3 | 4 | -1 | 3 |
| | Hermanos Colmenarez | Venezuela | 1 | 0 | 2 | 1 | 0 | 1 | 2 | 3 | -1 | 3 |
| | Juventude | Brazil | 1 | 0 | 2 | 1 | 0 | 1 | 2 | 3 | -1 | 3 |
| 177 | Rentistas | Uruguay | 1 | 0 | 2 | 1 | 0 | 1 | 1 | 2 | -1 | 3 |
| 177 | Always Ready | Bolivia | 1 | 0 | 2 | 1 | 0 | 1 | 1 | 2 | -1 | 3 |
| 178 | Mushuc Runa | Ecuador | 2 | 0 | 4 | 0 | 3 | 1 | 3 | 5 | -2 | 3 |
| 179 | Jaguares | Colombia | 1 | 0 | 2 | 1 | 0 | 1 | 2 | 4 | -2 | 3 |
| 180 | Paraná | Brazil | 2 | 0 | 4 | 1 | 0 | 3 | 3 | 8 | -5 | 3 |
| 181 | Independiente | Paraguay | 1 | 0 | 2 | 0 | 2 | 0 | 0 | 0 | 0 | 2 |
| 183 | Cobresal | Chile | 2 | 0 | 4 | 0 | 2 | 2 | 4 | 6 | -2 | 2 |
| 184 | Unión Comercio | Peru | 2 | 0 | 4 | 0 | 2 | 2 | 1 | 5 | -4 | 2 |
| 185 | Cerro Largo | Uruguay | 3 | 0 | 6 | 0 | 2 | 4 | 5 | 11 | -6 | 2 |
| 186 | Deportivo Táchira | Venezuela | 3 | 0 | 6 | 0 | 2 | 4 | 3 | 13 | -10 | 2 |
| 187 | Yaracuyanos | Venezuela | 1 | 0 | 2 | 0 | 1 | 1 | 1 | 2 | -1 | 1 |
| 188 | Portuguesa | Brazil | 1 | 0 | 2 | 0 | 1 | 1 | 1 | 2 | -1 | 1 |
| 189 | Grêmio Prudente | Brazil | 1 | 0 | 2 | 0 | 1 | 1 | 0 | 1 | -1 | 1 |
| 190 | Central Español | Uruguay | 1 | 0 | 2 | 0 | 1 | 1 | 0 | 1 | -1 | 1 |
| 191 | Maracaibo | Venezuela | 1 | 0 | 2 | 0 | 1 | 1 | 2 | 4 | -2 | 1 |
| 192 | Comerciantes Unidos | Peru | 1 | 0 | 2 | 0 | 1 | 1 | 2 | 4 | -2 | 1 |
| 193 | Delfín | Ecuador | 1 | 0 | 2 | 0 | 1 | 1 | 1 | 3 | -2 | 1 |
| | Once Caldas | Colombia | 1 | 0 | 2 | 0 | 1 | 1 | 1 | 3 | -2 | 1 |
| 194 | Quilmes | Argentina | 1 | 0 | 2 | 0 | 1 | 1 | 0 | 2 | -2 | 1 |
| 195 | Sport Rosario | Peru | 1 | 0 | 2 | 0 | 1 | 1 | 0 | 2 | -2 | 1 |
| 196 | Bella Vista | Uruguay | 1 | 0 | 2 | 0 | 1 | 1 | 1 | 4 | -3 | 1 |
| 197 | Deportes Antofagasta | Chile | 2 | 0 | 4 | 0 | 1 | 3 | 1 | 6 | -5 | 1 |
| 198 | Ayacucho | Peru | 3 | 0 | 6 | 0 | 1 | 5 | 0 | 10 | -10 | 1 |
| 199 | Carlos A. Mannucci | Peru | 1 | 0 | 2 | 0 | 0 | 2 | 3 | 5 | -2 | 0 |
| 200 | Atlético Palmaflor | Bolivia | 1 | 0 | 2 | 0 | 0 | 2 | 2 | 4 | -2 | 0 |
| 201 | Atlético Grau | Peru | 1 | 0 | 2 | 0 | 0 | 2 | 1 | 3 | -2 | 0 |
| 202 | Guaireña | Paraguay | 1 | 0 | 2 | 0 | 0 | 2 | 3 | 6 | -3 | 0 |
| 203 | La Paz | Bolivia | 1 | 0 | 2 | 0 | 0 | 2 | 1 | 4 | -3 | 0 |
| 204 | Joinville | Brazil | 1 | 0 | 2 | 0 | 0 | 2 | 0 | 3 | -3 | 0 |
| 205 | El Tanque Sisley | Uruguay | 1 | 0 | 2 | 0 | 0 | 2 | 0 | 3 | -3 | 0 |
| 206 | Academia Puerto Cabello | Venezuela | 1 | 0 | 2 | 0 | 0 | 2 | 0 | 3 | -3 | 0 |
| 207 | Binacional | Peru | 1 | 0 | 2 | 0 | 0 | 2 | 2 | 6 | -4 | 0 |
| 208 | Guayaquil City | Ecuador | 1 | 0 | 2 | 0 | 0 | 2 | 1 | 5 | -4 | 0 |
| 209 | Motagua | Honduras | 1 | 0 | 2 | 0 | 0 | 2 | 1 | 6 | -5 | 0 |
| 210 | Petrolero | Bolivia | 1 | 0 | 2 | 0 | 0 | 2 | 1 | 6 | -5 | 0 |
| 211 | Estudiantes de Caracas | Venezuela | 1 | 0 | 2 | 0 | 0 | 2 | 3 | 10 | -7 | 0 |
| 212 | León de Huánuco | Peru | 2 | 0 | 4 | 0 | 0 | 4 | 3 | 10 | -7 | 0 |
| 213 | Llaneros | Venezuela | 1 | 0 | 2 | 0 | 0 | 2 | 0 | 7 | -7 | 0 |
| 214 | Alajuelense | Costa Rica | 1 | 0 | 2 | 0 | 0 | 2 | 2 | 11 | -9 | 0 |
| 215 | Deportivo Municipal | Peru | 2 | 0 | 4 | 0 | 0 | 4 | 0 | 11 | -11 | 0 |
| 216 | Juan Aurich | Peru | 3 | 0 | 6 | 0 | 0 | 6 | 4 | 18 | -14 | 0 |

Playing at 2022 edition.
