= Historical table of the FIFA Club World Cup =

The FIFA Club World Cup is an international association football competition organised by the Fédération Internationale de Football Association (FIFA), the sport's global governing body. The championship was first contested as the FIFA Club World Championship in 2000. It was not held between 2001 and 2004 due to a combination of factors, most importantly the collapse of FIFA's marketing partner International Sport and Leisure. Following a change in format which saw the FIFA Club World Championship absorb the Intercontinental Cup, it was relaunched in 2005 and took its current name the season afterwards.

The current format of the tournament, in use since the competition was revamped ahead of the 2025 edition, features 32 teams competing for the title at venues within the host nation; 12 teams from Europe, 6 from South America, 4 from Asia, 4 from Africa, 4 from North, Central America and Caribbean, 1 from Oceania, and 1 team from the host nation. The teams are drawn into eight groups of four, with each team playing three group stage matches in a round-robin format. The top two teams from each group advance to the knockout stage, starting with the round of 16 and culminating with the final.

Spanish club Real Madrid leads the table in most titles, most wins and most points. Auckland City have the most tournament appearances with twelve, while Al Ahly have played the most matches (28), also holding the dubious record of the most losses with a total of fifteen. There are five teams which have won all of their games in the competition on the quest to their respective title or titles, those being Internazionale, Manchester City, Milan, São Paulo (two wins each) and Bayern Munich (four wins).

== Key legend ==
- Nat. = Nationality
- Apps = Appearances
- Pld = Matches played
- W = Matches won
- D = Matches drawn
- L = Matches lost
- PPG = Points per game

- GF = Goals for
- GA = Goals against
- GD = Goal difference
- % = Points percentage

== All-time table ==
As of 2025 FIFA Club World Cup

Historical table of the FIFA Club World Cup
Rank	Nat.	Club	Titles	Apps	Pts	Pld	W	D	L	GF	GA	GD	PPG
1	(Spain)	Real Madrid	5	7	51	20	16	3	1	57	20	+37	2.55
2	(Egypt)	Al Ahly	0	10	33	28	10	3	15	35	45	−10	1.17
3	(England)	Chelsea	2	3	27	11	9	0	2	23	8	+15	2.45
4	(Mexico)	Monterrey	0	6	25	16	7	4	5	31	21	+10	1.56
5	(Spain)	Barcelona	3	4	21	8	7	0	1	23	3	+20	2.62
6	(Germany)	Bayern Munich	2	3	21	9	7	0	2	24	6	+18	2.33
7	(Saudi Arabia)	Al-Hilal	0	4	19	14	5	4	5	25	25	0	1.35
8	(England)	Manchester City	1	2	15	6	5	0	1	23	6	+17	2.50
9	(France)	Paris Saint-Germain	0	1	15	7	5	0	2	16	4	+12	2.14
10	(Japan)	Sanfrecce Hiroshima	0	2	15	7	5	0	2	12	6	+6	2.14
11	(Brazil)	Corinthians	2	2	14	6	4	2	0	8	2	+6	2.33
12	(Brazil)	Fluminense	0	2	14	8	4	2	2	10	9	+1	1.75
13	(Italy)	Internazionale	1	2	13	6	4	1	1	11	4	+7	2.16
14	(Brazil)	Flamengo	0	3	13	8	4	1	3	17	13	+4	1.62
15	(Brazil)	Palmeiras	0	3	12	9	3	3	3	9	7	+2	1.33
16	(Japan)	Kashima Antlers	0	2	12	7	4	0	3	13	14	–1	1.71
17	(New Zealand)	Auckland City	0	12	12	20	3	3	14	10	45	–35	0.60
18	(Argentina)	River Plate	0	3	11	7	3	2	2	10	8	+2	1.57
19	(Brazil)	Vasco da Gama	0	1	10	4	3	1	0	7	2	+5	2.50
20	(England)	Manchester United	1	2	10	5	3	1	1	10	7	+3	2.00
21	(Germany)	Borussia Dortmund	0	1	10	5	3	1	1	9	7	+2	2.00
22	(Mexico)	Pachuca	0	5	10	12	3	1	8	13	18	–5	0.83
23	(Japan)	Urawa Red Diamonds	0	4	10	12	3	1	8	13	21	−8	0.83
24	(Mexico)	América	0	3	10	8	3	1	4	9	14	−5	1.25
25	(England)	Liverpool	1	2	9	4	3	0	1	6	2	+4	2.25
26	(Brazil)	Internacional	1	2	9	4	3	0	1	7	5	+2	2.25
27	(Morocco)	Raja Casablanca	0	2	9	7	3	0	4	12	14	−2	1.28
28	(United Arab Emirates)	Al Jazira	0	2	9	7	3	0	4	6	12	−6	1.29
29	(United Arab Emirates)	Al-Ain	0	2	8	7	2	2	3	11	21	–10	1.14
30	(Portugal)	Benfica	0	1	7	4	2	1	1	10	6	+4	1.72
31	(Tunisia)	Espérance de Tunis	0	4	7	9	2	1	6	11	17	−3	0.77
32	(Qatar)	Al-Sadd	0	2	7	6	2	1	3	9	15	−6	1.17
33	(Italy)	Juventus	0	1	6	4	2	0	2	11	7	+4	1.50
34	(South Korea)	Jeonbuk Hyundai Motors	0	2	6	4	2	0	2	8	4	+4	1.50
35	(Qatar)	Al-Duhail	0	1	6	3	2	0	1	6	2	+4	2.00
36	(Italy)	Milan	1	1	6	2	2	0	0	5	2	+3	3.00
37	(Brazil)	São Paulo	1	1	6	2	2	0	0	4	2	+2	3.00
38	(Australia)	Adelaide United	0	1	6	3	2	0	1	3	2	+1	2.00
38	(Mexico)	UANL	0	1	6	3	2	0	1	3	2	+1	2.00
40	(Saudi Arabia)	Al-Ittihad	0	2	6	5	2	0	3	9	9	0	1.20
41	(Japan)	Gamba Osaka	0	1	6	3	2	0	1	5	5	0	2.00
42	(Brazil)	Botafogo	0	1	6	4	2	0	2	3	3	0	1.50
43	(Costa Rica)	Saprissa	0	1	6	3	2	0	1	4	5	−1	2.00
44	(Spain)	Atlético Madrid	0	1	6	3	2	0	1	3	4	–1	2.05
45	(China)	Guangzhou	0	2	6	6	2	0	4	7	12	−5	1.00
46	(Democratic Republic of the Congo)	TP Mazembe	0	3	6	7	2	0	5	7	13	−6	0.85
47	(Mexico)	Necaxa	0	1	5	4	1	2	1	6	5	+1	1.25
48	(Japan)	Kashiwa Reysol	0	1	5	4	1	2	1	4	4	0	1.25
49	(Argentina)	Boca Juniors	0	2	5	5	1	2	2	7	9	−2	1.00
50	(United States)	Inter Miami	0	1	5	4	1	2	1	4	7	–3	1.25
51	(Mexico)	Atlante	0	1	4	3	1	1	1	5	4	+1	1.33
52	(United Arab Emirates)	Al-Wahda	0	1	4	3	1	1	1	6	6	0	1.33
53	(South Korea)	Pohang Steelers	0	1	4	3	1	1	1	4	4	0	1.33
54	(Tunisia)	Étoile du Sahel	0	1	4	3	1	1	1	3	3	0	1.33
55	(Mexico)	Cruz Azul	0	1	4	3	1	1	1	4	6	−2	1.33
56	(Austria)	Red Bull Salzburg	0	1	4	3	1	1	1	2	4	–2	1.33
57	(South Africa)	Mamelodi Sundowns	0	2	4	5	1	1	3	5	10	–5	0.80
58	(Ecuador)	LDU Quito	0	1	3	2	1	0	1	2	1	+1	1.50
59	(Iran)	Sepahan	0	1	3	2	1	0	1	4	4	0	1.50
60	(Argentina)	Estudiantes	0	1	3	2	1	0	1	3	3	0	1.50
61	(Australia)	Sydney FC	0	1	3	2	1	0	1	2	2	0	1.50
62	(Brazil)	Grêmio	0	1	3	2	1	0	1	1	1	0	1.50
63	(Brazil)	Atlético Mineiro	0	1	3	2	1	0	1	4	5	−1	1.50
64	(Argentina)	San Lorenzo	0	1	3	2	1	0	1	2	3	−1	1.50
65	(South Korea)	Seongnam FC	0	1	3	3	1	0	2	6	8	−2	1.00
66	(Brazil)	Santos	0	1	3	2	1	0	1	3	5	−2	1.50
67	(Saudi Arabia)	Al-Nassr	0	1	3	3	1	0	2	5	8	−3	1.00
68	(Portugal)	Porto	0	1	2	3	0	2	1	5	6	−1	0.66
69	(New Zealand)	Team Wellington	0	1	1	1	0	1	0	3	3	0	1.00
70	(Morocco)	Moghreb Tétouan	0	1	1	1	0	1	0	0	0	0	1.00
71	(Mexico)	Guadalajara	0	1	1	2	0	1	1	3	4	−1	0.50
72	(Algeria)	ES Sétif	0	1	1	2	0	1	1	2	3	−1	0.50
73	(Australia)	Western Sydney Wanderers	0	1	1	2	0	1	1	3	5	−2	0.50
74	(Colombia)	Atlético Nacional	0	1	1	2	0	1	1	2	5	−3	0.50
75	(United States)	Los Angeles FC	0	1	1	3	0	1	2	1	4	−3	0.33
76	(Morocco)	Wydad Casablanca	0	3	1	6	0	1	5	5	13	−8	0.16
77	(Mexico)	León	0	1	0	1	0	0	1	0	1	−1	0.00
78	(New Caledonia)	Hienghène Sport	0	1	0	1	0	0	1	1	3	−2	0.00
79	(United Arab Emirates)	Al-Ahli	0	1	0	1	0	0	1	0	2	−2	0.00
80	(New Zealand)	Waitakere United	0	2	0	2	0	0	2	2	5	−3	0.00
81	(French Polynesia)	AS Pirae	0	1	0	1	0	0	1	1	4	−3	0.00
82	(Papua New Guinea)	Hekari United	0	1	0	1	0	0	1	0	3	−3	0.00
83	(United States)	Seattle Sounders FC	0	2	0	4	0	0	4	2	8	−6	0.00
84	(Australia)	South Melbourne	0	1	0	3	0	0	3	1	7	−6	0.00
85	(South Korea)	Ulsan HD	0	3	0	7	0	0	7	7	17	−10	0.00
