= Sergio Martínez (Uruguayan footballer) =

Uruguayan footballer (born 1969)

Personal information
- Full name: Sergio Daniel Martínez Alzuri
- Date of birth: 15 February 1969 (age 57)
- Place of birth: Montevideo, Uruguay
- Height: 1.72 m (5 ft 8 in)
- Position: Striker

Senior career*
Years	Team	Apps	(Gls)
1986–1990	Defensor	29	(16)
1991–1992	Peñarol	37	(12)
1992–1997	Boca Juniors	137	(79)
1998–1999	Deportivo La Coruña	3	(0)
2000–2001	Nacional	40	(19)
Total		246	(126)

International career
1988–1997	Uruguay	35	(6)
Medal record
Representing Uruguay
Copa América
Winner	1995 Uruguay
Runner-up	1989 Brazil
- * Club domestic league appearances and goals

Sergio Daniel Martínez Alzuri (born 15 February 1969) is a former Uruguayan professional footballer who played as a striker. He was a two-time top scorer of the Argentine Primera División at Boca Juniors and also played professionally in Spain.

== Club career ==
Born in Montevideo, Martínez started his professional career with Defensor Sporting Club in 1986. In 1991, he signed for C.A. Peñarol, switching to Argentina in the following year with Boca Juniors.

In his five years with Boca, Martínez won the Apertura in 1992 and the Copa de Oro in 1993, being crowned the Apertura 1993's top scorer with 12 goals and the Clausura 1997's with 15; upon his departure, he ranked seventh in the club's all-time scoring list with 86 goals in 167 games (all competitions).

In January 1998, Martínez moved to Spain to play for Deportivo de La Coruña, only appearing in three La Liga matches in more than one year before returning to his homeland to finish his career, at Club Nacional de Football.

== International career ==
In 1995, Martínez helped Uruguay win the Copa América, scoring the decisive penalty in the shootout against Brazil in the final. The recipient of 35 full caps, he was also summoned for the 1990 FIFA World Cup, appearing in one game as the national side exited in the round of 16 (90 minutes against South Korea, 1–0 triumph).

== Honours ==
=== Club ===
Defensor

- Uruguayan Primera División: 1987

Boca Juniors

- Argentine Primera División: Apertura 1992
- Copa de Oro: 1993

Nacional

- Uruguayan Primera División: 2000, 2001

=== International ===
Uruguay

- Copa América: 1995

=== Individual ===
Boca Juniors

- Primera División Top Scorer: Clausura 1997
