= Copa de Oro =

- Trophy Nicolás Leoz, awarded to champions
- Organizer(s): CONMEBOL
- Founded: 1993
- Abolished: 1996; 30 years ago
- Region: South America
- Teams: 4
- Related competitions: List: Copa Libertadores; Supercopa Sudamericana; Copa CONMEBOL; Copa Master de Supercopa; Copa Master de CONMEBOL
- Most championships: (Argentina) Boca Juniors (Brazil) Cruzeiro (Brazil) Flamengo (1 title each)

The Copa de Oro (English: Gold Cup, Portuguese: Copa Ouro), or Copa de Oro Nicolás Leoz, was a football cup winners' cup competition contested on three occasions by the most recent winners of all CONMEBOL continental competitions. These included champions of the Copa Libertadores, Supercopa Sudamericana, Copa CONMEBOL, Supercopa Masters and Copa Masters CONMEBOL. The Recopa Sudamericana champions did not participate.

The cup is one of the many continental club competitions that have been organized by CONMEBOL. The first competition was held in 1993 featuring the 4 major continental champions of the previous season whilst the second competition in 1995 two continental champions declined to play leaving only two participants to play. In the final edition in 1996, all the continental champions accepted the invitation to play. Boca Juniors, Cruzeiro and Flamengo were the only winners of the tournament with one title each. Brazil became the most successful nation of the competition with two victories.

== History ==
The 1993 edition was contested by Atlético Mineiro (winners of the 1992 Copa CONMEBOL), Boca Juniors (winners of the 1992 Supercopa Masters), Cruzeiro (winners of the 1992 Supercopa Sudamericana) and São Paulo (winners of the 1992 Copa Libertadores). In the semifinals, Boca Juniors defeated Telê Santana's São Paulo in the mythical La Bombonera 1-0; the Paulistas' golden generation would return the favor on the return leg and the series went into extra time. Tied 1-1 on aggregate, Sergio Daniel Martínez made history as he scored the first ever golden goal in a South American competition. In the final, Boca Juniors held Atlético Mineiro to a 0-0 tie in the Mineirão and win 1-0 in Buenos Aires, with the goal coming from Carlos Mac Allister, to become the first ever winners of the competition. In 1994, the tournament was not played because of the scandal last year.

In 1995, 1994 Copa Libertadores champion Vélez Sársfield and 1994 Supercopa Sudamericana champion Independiente declined to play. This only left the 1994 Copa CONMEBOL and 1995 Supercopa Masters champions in the tournament. Cruzeiro faced São Paulo; in the first leg in Belo Horizonte, São Paulo won 0-1 before the game was suspended at the 47th minute due to Cruzeiro having four players sent off in the first half (they had used all the substitutions) and having one injured player leaving just six in the field for the Reposa; in accordance with the regulations, the minimum number of players per team is seven. However, Cruzeiro came back from this and won 0-1 in the Morumbi to eventually win the trophy on penalties. Due to scheduling conflicts, this season was played as part of the Supercopa Sudamericana, specifically the quarterfinal stage.

The 1996 Copa de Oro was played entirely in the city of Manaus and the final edition. The four teams were the champions of the 1995 Copa Libertadores, 1995 Copa CONMEBOL and 1996 Copa Masters CONMEBOL in addition to the runner-up of the 1995 Supercopa Sudamericana as the 1995 champion Independiente declined to play. In the semifinals, Flamengo defeated Rosario Central 2-1 and São Paulo 3-1 and become champions of the competition.

== Records and statistics ==
=== List of finals ===
Keys

- aet: after extra time
- p: defined on penalty shoot-out
- Match decided by a penalty shootout after extra time
- Match playoff after the series ended tied on aggregate
- Defined on penalty shoot-out in the second leg

Ed.	Year	Winners	1st. leg	2nd. leg	Playoff/ Agg.	Runner-up	Venue (1st leg)	City (1st leg)	Venue (2nd leg)	City (2nd leg)	Ref.
1	1993	(Argentina) Boca Juniors	0–0	1–0	–	(Brazil) Atlético Mineiro	Mineirão	Belo Horizonte	La Bombonera	Buenos Aires	
–	1994	No competition held									
2	1995	(Brazil) Cruzeiro	0–1	1–0	(4–1 p)	(Brazil) São Paulo	Mineirão	Belo Horizonte	Pacaembu	São Paulo	
3	1996	(Brazil) Flamengo	3–1			(Brazil) São Paulo	Vivaldão	Manaus	–		

=== Performances by club ===
Club	Titles	Runners-up	Seasons won	Seasons runner-up
(Argentina) Boca Juniors	1	0	1993	—
(Brazil) Cruzeiro	1	0	1995	—
(Brazil) Flamengo	1	0	1996	—
(Brazil) São Paulo	0	2	—	1995, 1996
(Brazil) Atlético Mineiro	0	1	—	1993

=== Performances by nation ===
Nation	Won	Runners-up	Winning Clubs	Runners-Up
Brazil	2	3	Cruzeiro (1), Flamengo (1)	São Paulo (2), Atlético Mineiro (1)
Argentina	1	0	Boca Juniors (1)	—
