= Cassie =

Name list

- Gender: Female

Other names
- Related names: Casandra, Cassandre, Cassandra, Cassondra, Casey, Cassidy, Cassy, Catherine, Katherine

Cassie is a feminine given name and a short form of various other given names Cassandra, Cassandro, and Cassidy mostly used in English-speaking countries. It is more rarely a surname. People and fictional characters named Cassie include:

== People with the name ==
=== Given name or nickname ===
==== Entertainment ====
- Cassie Compton (born 1987), British West End actress, singer and CharliiTV presenter
- Cassie Davis (born 1986), Australian singer, songwriter and producer. Cassie Brown: American modelo from California. born 1995
- Cassie Gaines (1948–1977), American singer
- Cassie Jaye (born 1986), American film director
- Cassie Powney (born 1983), British actor
- Cassie Ramone (born 1986), American rock guitarist and singer
- Cassie Scerbo (born 1990), American actress, singer and dancer
- Cassie Steele (born 1989), Canadian actress and singer-songwriter
- Cassie Taylor (born 1986), American singer-songwriter and blues musician
- Cassie Ventura (born 1986), known mononymously as Cassie, American recording artist, model, actress and dancer
- Cassie Yates (born 1951), American actress

==== Sports ====
- Cassie Andrews (cricketer) (1908–1962), Australian cricketer
- Cassie Campbell (born 1973), Canadian ice hockey player
- Cassie Chadwick (1857–1907), alias used by Canadian fraud artist Elizabeth Bigley
- Cassie Hager (born 1984), American basketball player
- Cassie Jackman (born 1972), English squash player
- Cassie Law, American rugby player
- Cassie Mitchell (born 1981), American chemist, professor and Paralympic discus thrower and cyclist
- Cassie Patten (born 1987), British freestyle swimmer
- Cassandra Potter (born 1981), American curler
- Cassie Sharpe (born 1992), Canadian freestyle skier
- Cassy Vericel (born 1991), French former artistic gymnast

==== Writing and journalism ====
- Cassie Brown (1919–1986), journalist, author, publisher and editor
- Cassie Edwards (born 1936), American romance novelist
- Catherine Mackin (1939–1982), pioneer woman journalist in American television network broadcasting
- Cassie Stocks, Canadian writer

==== Other people with the name ====
- Cassie Bernall (1981–1999), student killed in the Columbine High School massacre
- Cassie Julia, American politician
- Cassie Kozyrkov, data scientist and science communicator
- Cassandra Cassy O'Connor (born 1967), Australian politician
- Cassie Jo Stoddart (1989–2006), American murder victim
- Cassie, a ring name of Peyton Royce, Australian model and professional wrestler, born Cassie McIntosh in 1992

=== Surname ===
- A. B. D. Cassie, scientist, after whom Cassie's law was named
- Alice Mary Cassie (1887–1963) New Zealand political activist and feminist
- James Cassie (1819–1879), Scottish painter
- Meryl Cassie (born 1984), South African-born actress and aspiring singer
- William Fisher Cassie (1905–1985), British civil engineer and academic

== Fictional characters ==
- Cassie, from the science-fiction book series Animorphs
- Cassie, protagonist of Ruin, the downloadable content for Five Nights at Freddy's: Security Breach
- Cassie, from the animated pre-school cartoon Dragon Tales
- Cassy, from the cartoon series Ultimate Book of Spells
- Cassie Aganovic, from the book Finding Cassie Crazy
- Cassie Ainsworth, from the television series Skins
- Cassie Binegar, title character of the novel Cassie Binegar by Patricia MacLachlan
- Cassie Blake, from novel and television show The Secret Circle
- Cassie Brady, from the soap opera Days of our Lives
- Cassie Cage, daughter of Johnny Cage and Sonya Blade from the Mortal Kombat video game series
- Cassie Cain, a.k.a. Black Bat, from DC Comics
- Cassie Callison, in the soap opera One Life to Live
- Cassie Carpenter, in the BBC soap opera EastEnders
- Cassie Chan, from the Power Rangers universe
- Cassie 'Cow' Cowan, in the public information film Cow
- Cassie Dunleavy, in the television series The 4400
- Cassie Ferguson, from the 1975 musical A Chorus Line
- Cassie Hack, in the Hack/Slash comic books
- Cassie Howard, in the HBO series Euphoria
- Cassie Keller, protagonist of the 2007 film The Haunting Hour: Don't Think About It
- Cassie Lang, a.k.a. Stature, from Marvel Comics
- Cassie Logan, one of the main characters in the book Roll of Thunder, Hear My Cry
- Cassandra "Cassie" A. Mondragon, a character from Philippine drama series Kadenang Ginto
- Cassie Munro, a character in the 2006 film RV
- Cassie Newman, former character on the soap opera The Young and the Restless
- Cassie Palmer, in the Cassandra Palmer novel series
- Cassie Rose, a supporting character in Minecraft Story Mode
- Cassie Rymar, a minor character in Fullmetal Alchemist light novel, Under The Faraway Sky
- Cassie Sandsmark, a.k.a. Wonder Girl, from DC Comics
- Cassie St. Commons, Dusk (comics) in the Marvel Comics universe
- Cassie Sullivan, from the trilogy and movie The 5th Wave
- Cassie Turner, from the Australian television soap opera Home and Away
- Cassie Layne Winslow, from the former CBS daytime soap opera Guiding Light
- Cassie Newton, from the television series Buffy the Vampire Slayer
- Cassie Lenue, from the television series Elementary

== See also ==
- Casandra
- Cassandra (disambiguation)
- Cassey (disambiguation)
- Cassi (disambiguation)
- Cassiopeia (disambiguation)
- Kassandra (disambiguation) (includes Kasandra)
- Kassi (disambiguation)
- Kassie (disambiguation)
