= Kassie =

Kassie may refer to:

Given name

- Kassie DePaiva (born 1961), American actress
- Kassie Miller (born 1982), American model
- Kassie Carlen, localized name of main character of Super Pig

Surname

- Emily Kassie (born 1992), Canadian filmmaker and investigative journalist

== See also ==
- Casandra
- Cassandra (disambiguation)
- Cassey (disambiguation)
- Cassi (disambiguation)
- Cassie (disambiguation)
- Kassandra (disambiguation)
- Kassi (disambiguation)
- Kassidi (disambiguation)
- Kassy
