= Casandra =

- Gender: Female

Other names
- Related names: Cassandra, Cassandre, Cassey, Cassi, Cassie, Kasandra, Kassie, Kassi

Casandra may refer to:

- Casandra Stark, female film director
- Cristina Casandra (born 1977), Romanian long-distance runner
- Silviu Casandra (born 1975), Romanian race walker

== See also ==
- Cassandra (disambiguation)
- Cassi (disambiguation)
- Cassie (disambiguation)
- Kassandra (disambiguation)
- Kassie (disambiguation)
- Kasi (disambiguation)
