= Cassi (disambiguation) =

The Cassi were a tribe of Iron Age Britain.

Cassi may also refer to:

== People with the given name ==
- Cassi Chandler (born 1958), American special agent and spokesperson
- Cassi Davis (born 1964), American actress and singer
- Cassi Thomson (born 1993), Australian-American actress and singer
- Cassi Van Den Dungen (born 1992), Australian model

== People with the surname ==
- Enrico Cassi (1863–1913), Italian sculptor
- Giuseppe Cassì (born 1963), Italian politician
- Llorenç Cassi (1940–2020), Spanish Catalan athlete
- Lorenzo Alier Cassi (1878–1942), Spanish Catalan lawyer and politician
- Mario Cassi (born 1973), Italian baritone

== Other uses ==
- Cassi Hill, a residential area in Saint Thomas, United States Virgin Islands
- Chemical Abstracts Service Source Index, from the American Chemical Society

== See also ==
- Casey (disambiguation)
- Cassandra (disambiguation)
- Cassie (disambiguation)
- Cassis (disambiguation)
- Kassandra (disambiguation)
- Kassi (disambiguation)
- Kassie (disambiguation)
