= Cassandro (disambiguation) =

Cassandro is a Mexican professional wrestler (born 1970).

Cassandro may also refer to:

== People with the surname ==
Cassandro is an Italian and Spanish masculine form of the given name Cassandra, and an Italian surname. Notable people with the name include:

- Giovanni Cassandro (1913–1989), Italian archivist
- Tammaro Cassandro (born 1993), Italian Olympic athlete
- Tommaso Cassandro (born 2000), Italian footballer

== Other uses ==
- Cassandro (film), 2023 film by Rogers Ross Williams

== See also ==
- Cassander
- Cassandra (name)
