= Alberto Assa =

Alberto Assa (Istanbul, 6 May 1909 – Barranquilla, 13 March 1996) was an Ottoman-born Colombian educator, translator and humanist of Sephardi descent.

== Early years ==
Alberto Assa Anavi was born from Jewish parents in Haydarpaşa, a suburb in the Asian side of Constantinople. He was first educated by French and Swiss governesses, and later in a Lasallian French secondary school in Constantinople. He studied to be an educator at the University of Hamburg. He participated as International Brigadist in the Spanish Civil War.

== Work ==
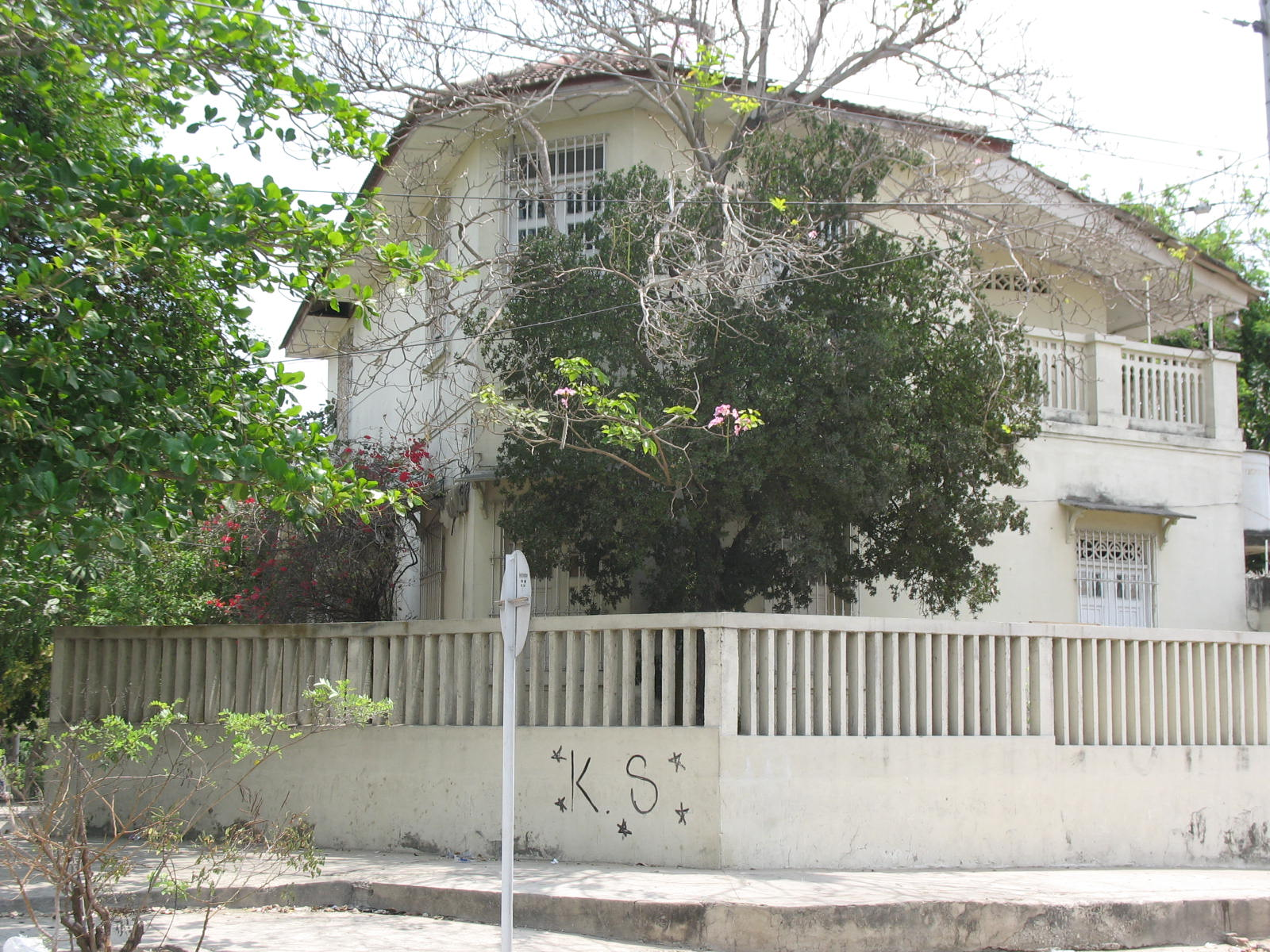
Instituto Experimental del Atlántico.

When he arrived in Barranquilla (1952), where he would be known as "el profesor Assa" (teacher Assa), this polyglot (Ladin, French, German, Spanish, Catalan, English, Dutch) founded the Instituto de Lenguas Modernas (1952), becoming since then one of the main promoters of education and culture in the city. He also founded the Concert of the Month Foundation (1957), the Escuela Superior de Idiomas, the Universidad Pedagógica del Caribe, the Instituto Pestalozzi, the Faculty of Education of the Universidad del Atlántico and the Instituto Experimental del Atlántico José Celestino Mutis (1970), where, in his own words, he tried to propose a form of Christian Socialism.

He was one of the first teachers of Colegio Nacional José Eusebio Caro (1952), and he was a professor to the Universidad del Atlántico and to the Universidad del Norte.

In his weekly column El Rincón de Casandra (The Corner of Cassandra) (he adopted the pseudonym in an allusion to the Greek priestess), published in the El Nacional, del Caribe and El Heraldo newspapers, he defended and promoted culture and education in Barranquilla for more than 40 years. These columns were compiled in two volumes on the initiative of the Atlántico Governor's Office in 1994, two years before his death.

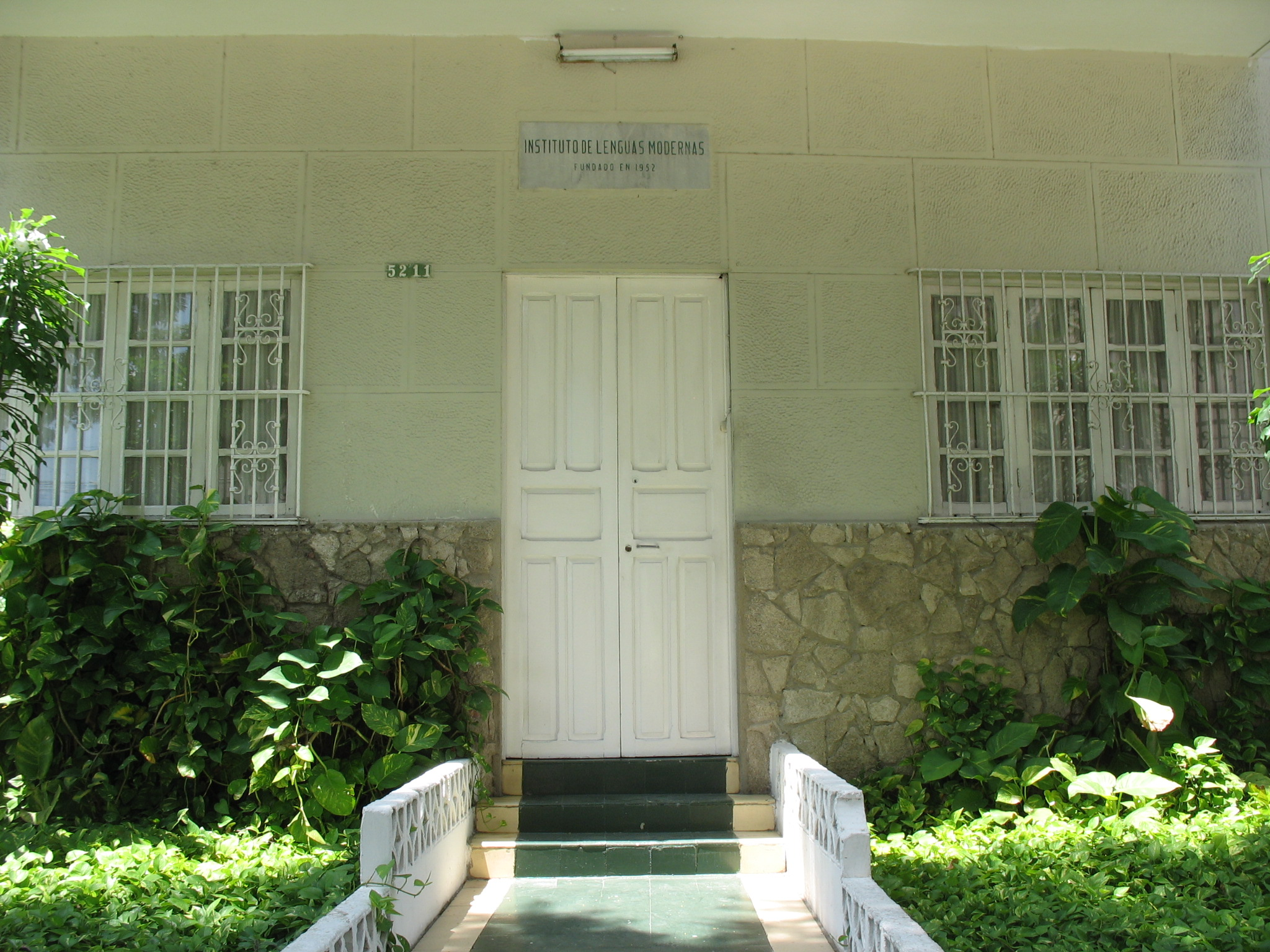
Instituto de Lenguas Modernas.

His last wish was to donate his body for practices at the Faculty of Medicine of the Universidad Libre de Colombia, Barranquilla. He died in Barranquilla on 13 March 1996.

As a tribute to his personality and his dedication to education, several schools have been named after him. Likewise, out of his great efforts to achieve that poor students had access to scholarships to study abroad, in 2004 the mayor of Barranquilla created the Instituto Distrital de Crédito para la Educación Superior Alberto Assa (District Institute of Credit for Higher Education), a public institution to award scholarships and educative credit; however, it was liquidated in 2009.

== Awards ==
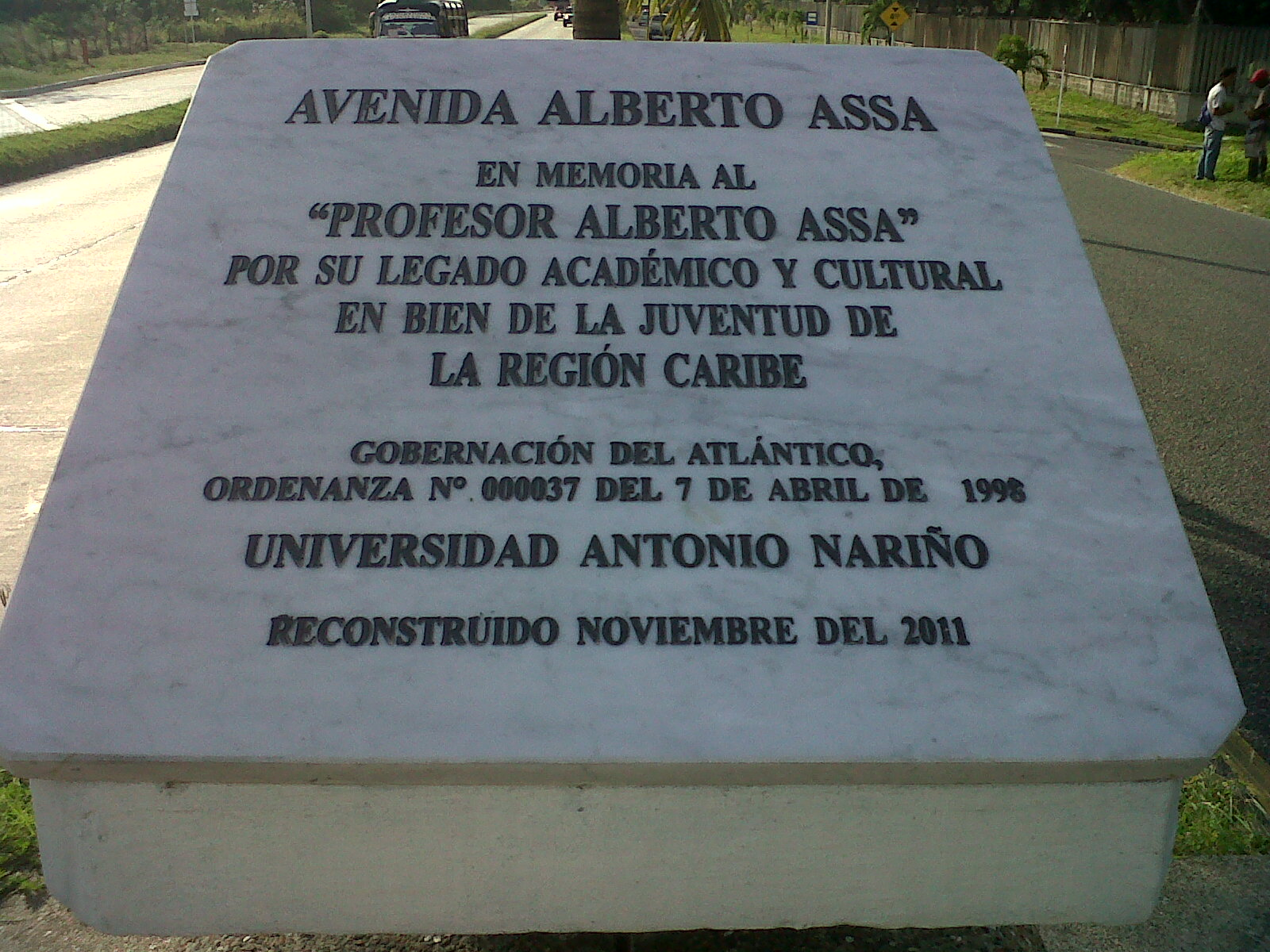
Plaque of the Alberto Assa avenue.

In recognition of his dedication to promote education and culture, Assa was awarded several times in Colombia and other countries:

- Medal of the Italian Government.
- Medal of the Spanish Government.
- Colombia's Medal to the Education Merit.
- Degree Honoris Causa of the Universidad del Atlántico.
- Ordre des Palmes académiques, awarded by the French government (1979).
- Simón Bolívar medal, awarded by the Colombian Ministry of Education (1992).
- Puerta de Oro de Colombia medal, silver category, awarded in 1992 by the Atlántico Governor's office.

In 1998, the Atlántico Governor's office named the extension of the 51B street (also known as Puerto Colombia highway or "Universities corridor") as "Alberto Assa" because there are several universities and high schools alongside.

== Translations ==
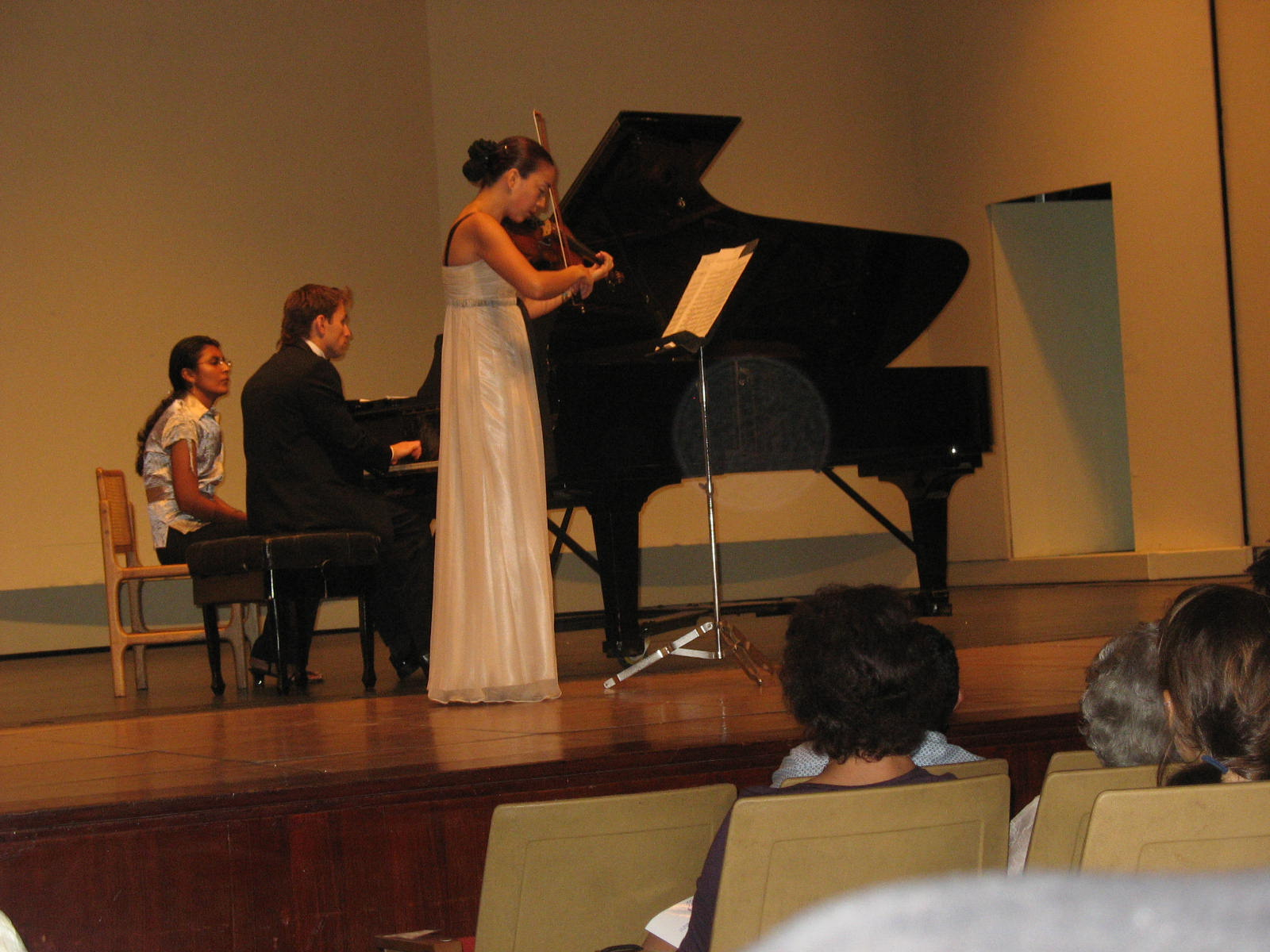
Concierto del Mes. Sergei Sichkov and Angélica Gámez. 5 April 2008.

El Rincón de Casandra was also the scenario to his multiple translations into Spanish such as:

- Rainer Maria Rilke's Cartas a un joven poeta (Briefe an einen jungen Dichter).
- Stefan Zweig's Los ojos del hermano eterno (Die Augen des ewigen Bruders).
- Stefan Zweig's Raquel discute con Dios (Rahel rechtet mit Gott).
- Felix Timmermans's Las muy bellas horas de la beguinita Sinforosa (De zeer schone uren van juffrouw Symforosa, begijntje).
- Frans Masereel's Historia sin palabras (Geschichte ohne Worte).
- Thomas Mann's Travesías con don Quijote (Meerfahrt mit Don Quijote).
- El libro de las incoherencias.

Alberto Assa wrote a short story, Cartas kambules de Adil Savinkan (Adil Savinkan's Kambul letters).

== Bibliography ==
- ASSA, Alberto (Casandra de Campo Alegre). Los rincones de Casandra. Barranquilla: Gobernación del Atlántico, 1994. Vol. I y II.

== Sources ==
- MARTÍN RAMOS, José L. Rojos contra Franco. Historia del PSUC 1939-1947. Editor: Edhasa. ISBN 84-350-2643-4.
- HEINE, Harmut. La oposición política al franquismo de 1939 a 1952. Barcelona: Crítica, 1983. 499 p.
- AGUADO SÁNCHEZ, F. El Maquis en España. Su Historia. Sus Documentos. Editorial: San Martín. Año: 1975-1976. ISBN 84-7140-106-1.
- MORÁN, Gregorio. Miseria y grandeza del Partido Comunista de España (1939–1985). Barcelona: Editorial Planeta, 1986. ISBN 84-320-5852-1.
- Diarios El Heraldo, del Caribe, El Nacional.
