= Kassi =

Kassi may refer to:

== People ==
- Kassi (empress) (fl. 1341), empress of Mali
- Kassi Akesse Mathias (born 1986), Ivorian footballer
- Kassi Manlan (1947–2001), Ivorian diplomat
- Luc Kassi (born 1994), Ivorian footballer
- Lucien Kassi-Kouadio (1963–2024), Ivorian footballer
- Norma Kassi (born 1954), Canadian politician
- Thierry Kassi (born 2000), Ivorian footballer

== Other uses ==
- Kassi, Viljandi County, Estonia
- Kassi, Võru County, Estonia

== See also ==
- Kasi (Pashtun tribe), in Pakistan
- Kasi (disambiguation)
- Kassie (disambiguation)
- Kassis (disambiguation)
- Cassi (disambiguation)
