= HIV/AIDS in Ivory Coast =

The infection rate of HIV/AIDS in Ivory Coast is estimated at 2.70% in adults ages 15–49. Ivory Coast has a generalized HIV epidemic with the highest prevalence rate in the West African region. The prevalence rate appears to have remained relatively stable for the past decade, with recent declines among pregnant women in urban areas. Civil conflict in the country continues to hinder the collection of new national HIV-related data.

In 2005, a national AIDS Indicator Survey was completed, which provided accurate data on various aspects of the epidemic, including prevalence rates among diverse demographic sub-groups. Populations at comparatively high risk for HIV infection include women ages 20–24, people in prostitution, youth and the military. The prolonged political-military crisis, in addition to exacerbating the vulnerability of these groups, is likely to have created additional at-risk populations given the large-scale military deployment, massive population displacement, and increase in poverty.

Political instability, delays in the disarmament process and the threat of armed insurgency continue to be major challenges and barriers to external assistance. The prolonged sociopolitical crisis has disrupted and restricted access to health and other public services, while at the same time increasing HIV transmission and vulnerability among many sub-populations. Ivory Coast has a more developed public health and education system in terms of human resources and infrastructure than many of its neighbors, but the overall health system is weak, and health and economic gains have been reversed by the crisis.

Blood screening services and treatment for sexually transmitted infections and tuberculosis are very limited. Regions in the North and West, which have not been under government control, have experienced a complete and prolonged disruption of public-sector services and an exodus of skilled professionals. Major disparities exist between urban and rural health services, with a paucity of health professionals and private practitioners outside the major cities.

== See also ==
- Health in Ivory Coast
- HIV/AIDS in Africa
