= Netpage =

System software and infrastructure

Netpage is a software system and infrastructure which makes printed paper interactive. It has multiple manifestations, including digital pens, digital paper, and augmented reality interfaces, such as the Netpage mobile app. The app uses image recognition technology to recognise content on Netpage-enabled printed pages, and then serves up a "digital twin" of the recognized page. The digital twin contains enhanced functionality such as the ability to share the page via social media sites (e.g. Facebook, Pinterest and Twitter), the ability to purchase products, watch embedded videos, follow hyperlinks, translate text, download and attach files, and other functionality.

Any iOS or Android smartphone acts as the mouse, and the printed surface acts as the screen. When in use, the Netpage universal print browser app looks like the smartphone is displaying a camera view of the printed page, but is actually displaying a digital web page (the digital twin) styled to mimic the printed page and rendered in real time. The digital twin can have as many web links and features as required, allowing the printed surface to have identical functionality to that possible on a web page displayed on a touch screen device.

The technology launched in Esquire magazine, which is published by Hearst, in the December 2012 edition as reported by the Wall Street Journal and Mashable.

The technology is developed and funded in Australia.

== Examples of Netpage documents ==
The following documents are freely available and are good demonstrations of the capabilities of Netpage. They require the use of the Netpage app, which can be downloaded from the Apple App Store.

- "Abbey Road" - an article by Pottinger describing the challenges of identifying revolutionary businesses or ideas while they are still at an early stage.

== See also ==
- Augmented reality
