= Dawn French =

British actress, comedian and writer (born 1957)

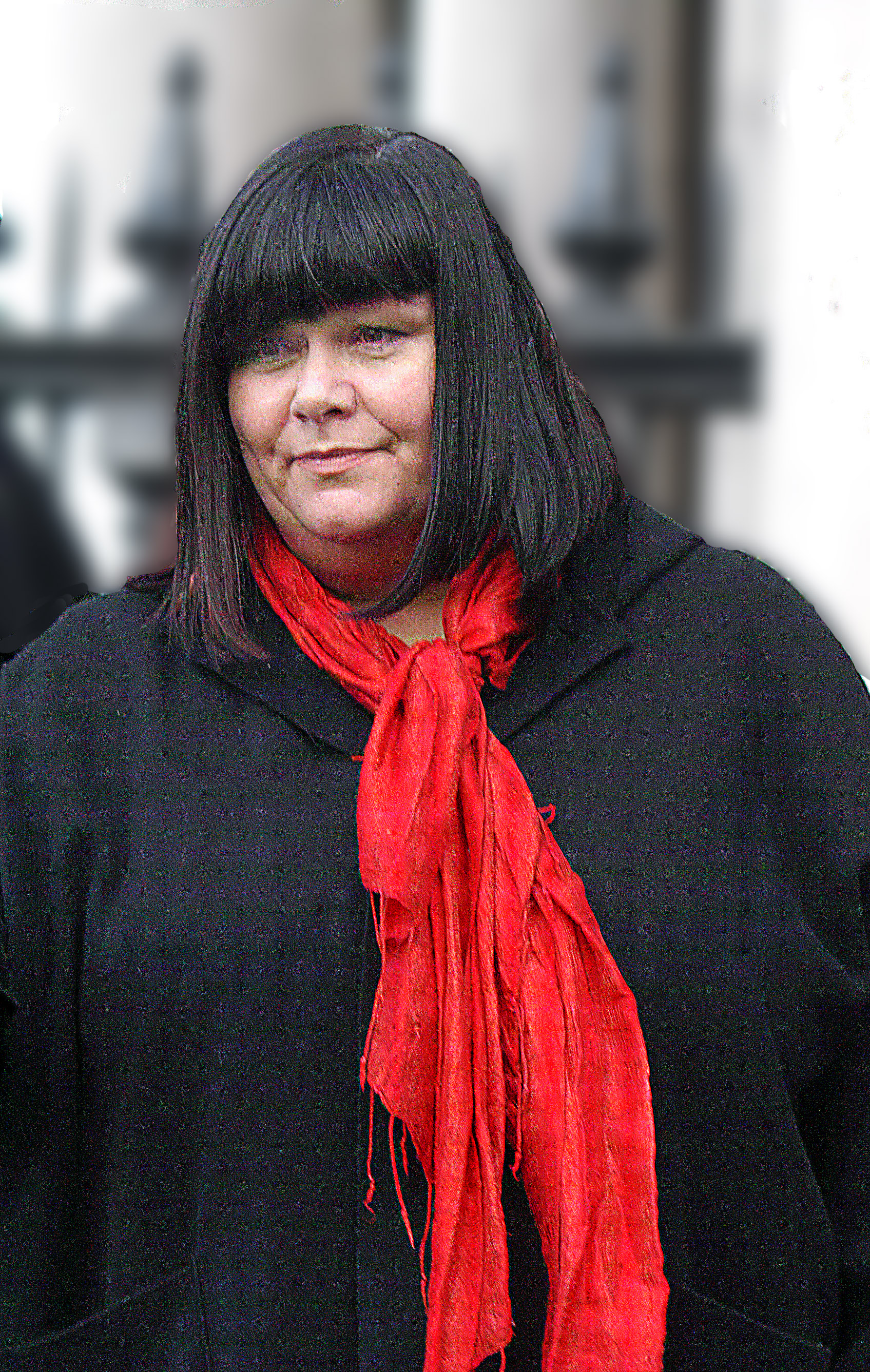
- French in 2005
- Born: 11 October 1957 (age 69); Holyhead, Wales
- Education: Royal Central School of Speech and Drama (BA)
- Occupations: Actress; comedian; writer
- Years active: 1981–present
- Notable work: The Comic Strip Presents... French and Saunders; Murder Most Horrid; The Vicar of Dibley
- Spouse: Lenny Henry (m. 1984; div. 2010) Mark Bignell (m. 2013)
- Children: 1
- Awards: BAFTA Fellowship (2009, with Jennifer Saunders)

Dawn Roma French (born 11 October 1957) is a British actress, comedian, and writer. She is known for writing and starring in the BBC sketch comedy series French and Saunders (1987–2007) with her friend and comedy partner Jennifer Saunders, and for starring in the BBC comedy series Murder Most Horrid (1991–1999) and The Vicar of Dibley (1994–2007). She has been nominated for seven British Academy Television Awards and won a BAFTA Fellowship with Saunders in 2009.

== Early life ==
Dawn Roma French was born in Holyhead on 11 October 1957, the daughter of English parents Felicity Roma (née O'Brien; 1934–2012) and Denys Vernon French (1932–1977). Her parents were from Plymouth. She has an older brother named Gary. She was born in the Welsh town of Holyhead because her father, who was in the Royal Air Force, was stationed at nearby RAF Valley. He was later stationed at RAF Leconfield in the East Riding of Yorkshire, where Queen Elizabeth the Queen Mother had tea at the family's home when French was three years old. RAF archive footage of this event was later included in French's comedy tour video Thirty Million Minutes.

French was public school educated, which was partly funded by the RAF. When her father was stationed at RAF Faldingworth in Lincolnshire, she attended Caistor Grammar School for one year. She later attended boarding school at St Dunstan's Abbey in Plymouth, where she was a member of Downton house, then spent a year studying abroad at the Spence School in New York City on a debating scholarship she had won at school.

French has said that her confidence and belief in herself stem from her father, who told her how beautiful she was every day. She said, "He taught me to value myself. He told me that I was beautiful and the most precious thing in his life." He had a history of depression and made two suicide attempts, but managed to conceal his struggles from his children before eventually taking his own life when French was 19 years old.

In 1977, French began studying drama at the Royal Central School of Speech and Drama, where she met her future comedy partner Jennifer Saunders. Both came from RAF backgrounds and had grown up on the same camps, and later discovered that they shared the same best friend despite never meeting each other. Saunders recalled that her first impression of French was as a "cocky little upstart", while French considered Saunders to be "snooty and aloof". They originally did not like each other as French wanted to become a drama teacher, with Saunders loathing the idea and thus disliking French for being enthusiastic and confident about it.

French and Saunders shared a flat while at college and were influenced to pursue comedy by their flatmates as part of their projects for college. After talking in depth for the first time, they became friends. While at college, French broke up with her fiancé, a former Royal Navy officer. After French and Saunders graduated from the Royal Central School, they decided to form a double act (involving wearing tampons in their ears) called the Menopause Sisters, which Saunders later described as cringeworthy. According to the manager of the club where they first performed, "They didn't seem to give a damn. There was no star quality about them at all."

== Career ==
=== Television ===
==== 1980s ====
French has had an extensive career on television, debuting on Channel 4's The Comic Strip Presents series in an episode called "Five Go Mad in Dorset" in 1982. Each episode presented a self-contained story and, in addition to French and Saunders, showcased Comic Strip performers Peter Richardson, Rik Mayall, Nigel Planer, Robbie Coltrane and Adrian Edmondson. She acted in 27 of the 37 episodes and wrote two of them. One episode featured a parody of spaghetti westerns and another a black and white film about a hopelessly goofy boy. Some of French's first exposure to a wider audience occurred when comedy producer Martin Lewis recorded a Comic Strip record album in 1981 which featured sketches by French & Saunders. The album was released on Springtime!/Island Records in September 1981 and presented French and Jennifer Saunders to an audience outside London. In 1985, French starred with Saunders, Tracey Ullman, Ruby Wax and Joan Greenwood in Girls on Top, which portrayed four eccentric women sharing a flat in London.

French has co-written and starred in her and Saunders' comedy series, French & Saunders, which debuted in 1987. On their show, the duo have spoofed many celebrities such as Madonna, Cher, Catherine Zeta-Jones and the Spice Girls. They have also parodied films such as The Lord of the Rings, Star Wars and Harry Potter and the Chamber of Secrets. After 20 years being on television together, their sketch series A Bucket o' French & Saunders, began airing on 8 September 2007.

==== 1990s ====
In 1999, French and Saunders starred together in another Jon Plowman comedy for BBC1, Let Them Eat Cake. It was set in pre-revolutionary France at the Palace of Versaille. French was a maid to Saunder's ignorant and spoilt aristocratic character.

French and Saunders have also followed separate careers. During French's time starring in Murder Most Horrid, from 1991 to 1999, she played a different character each week, whether it was the murderer, victim, or both.

French's biggest solo television role to date has been as the title figure in the long-running BBC comedy The Vicar of Dibley, which Richard Curtis created for her. The show began in 1994. She stars as Geraldine Granger, a vicar of a small fictional village called Dibley. An audience of 12.3 million watched the final full-length episode to see her character's marriage ceremony. She appeared on The Vicar of Dibley with Damian Lewis in a mini-episode made for Comic Relief in 2013. She was nominated for a BAFTA for Best Comedy Performance in the last episode of The Vicar of Dibley. Repeats of the show on BBC One still attract millions of viewers and it also retains a following amongst PBS viewers in the United States. Although the main series ended in 2007, the show has returned for numerous short special episodes since, the latest four of which aired in December 2020.

In 1995, she appeared as a talk-show host in a Comic Relief sketch called Dawn, written by Victoria Wood. The sketch also featured Wood herself, Celia Imrie, Lill Roughley, Anne Reid, Philip Lowrie, Robert Kingswell, Bryan Burdon, Duncan Preston, Jim Broadbent, and Lynda Bellingham.

==== 2000s ====
In 2002, French appeared in the comedy/drama mini-series Ted and Alice. In the series, set in the Lake District, French played a tourist information officer who falls in love with an alien. She appeared once in the Saunders led sitcom Absolutely Fabulous as TV interviewer Kathy in 1992, a parody of Lorraine Kelly, she reprised that role for Absolutely Fabulous: The Movie in 2016 as a more established veteran journalist as Kelly is now. She also appeared in the BBC sitcom Wild West, with Catherine Tate, in which she played a lesbian living in Cornwall, more through lack of choice than any specific natural urge. This series did not meet with as much success as her earlier roles and it ended in 2004 after two years.

French played a major role in Jam & Jerusalem as a woman called Rosie who has dissociative identity disorder and with it an alter ego called "Margaret". She co-starred alongside Sue Johnston, Jennifer Saunders (who also created and wrote the series) and Joanna Lumley. She made a guest appearance in Little Britain as Vicky Pollard's mother. French also appeared in a special version of Little Britain Live which featured several celebrity guests and was shown by the BBC as part of Comic Relief. She played the part of a lesbian barmaid in a sketch with Daffyd Thomas.

In 2006, French appeared in Agatha Christie's Marple in the 2006 episode "Sleeping Murder". She appeared as Caroline Arless in the BBC television drama Lark Rise to Candleford in 2008. Talking about her role, she has stated, "I'm quite a vibrant character. She's quite extreme, in that she drinks too much, laughs too much and sings too much. But she loves her family very much; it's just that she goes over the top sometimes."

==== 2010s ====
In late 2010, French starred in Roger & Val Have Just Got In with actor Alfred Molina, which aired for two series.

French appeared in Little Crackers, short comedy films which were broadcast over Christmas in 2010.

French appeared as a special guest on Michael Bublé's Home For Christmas in December 2011. In July 2012, she was a judge in ITV's Superstar live shows. In March 2013, it was announced that French would replace Brian McFadden on the judging panel of Nine Network's Australia's Got Talent alongside Kyle Sandilands, Geri Halliwell (who replaced Dannii Minogue) and Timomatic who is the additional fourth judge. French departed the show after one series and was replaced by Kelly Osbourne.

From 2016 until 2019, French starred in three series of Delicious on Sky 1, co-starring as a talented cook who is having an affair with her celebrity chef ex-husband (Iain Glen) who has remarried and started a successful hotel business with his new wife (Emilia Fox) in Cornwall.

==== 2020s ====
In 2020, she appeared in the six-part series The Trouble with Maggie Cole alongside Mark Heap.

In 2021, French appeared as a celebrity guest judge on the second series of RuPaul's Drag Race UK, where she judged the final five contestants, Lawrence Chaney, Bimini Bon-Boulash, Tayce, Ellie Diamond and A'Whora, on their comedy stand-up routines.

In 2026 she appeared in Can you Keep a Secret?, also alongside Mark Heap.

=== Film ===
In 1996, French appeared in The Adventures of Pinocchio as "The Baker's Wife" alongside Martin Landau and star Jonathan Taylor Thomas. French played The Fat Lady in the film adaptation of Harry Potter and the Prisoner of Azkaban, replacing Elizabeth Spriggs, who played the character in the first film of the series. French's then-husband, Lenny Henry, provided the voice of the Shrunken Head in the same film, though they shared no screen time. In 2005, French provided the voice for the character Mrs. Beaver in Disney and Walden Media's film adaptation of C. S. Lewis' The Chronicles of Narnia: The Lion, the Witch and the Wardrobe. In 2010, French lent her voice to the role of Angie the Elephant in the English dub of the German-British environmental animated film Animals United.

=== Theatre ===
She has also taken roles in the theatre. French has appeared in plays such as A Midsummer Night's Dream, My Brilliant Divorce, and Smaller, the latter of which she played a schoolteacher caring for her disabled mother. January 2007 saw French performing as the Duchesse de Crackentorp at the Royal Opera House, Covent Garden, London, in The Daughter of the Regiment (La fille du régiment) by Gaetano Donizetti starring Natalie Dessay and Juan Diego Flórez. French returned to Covent Garden and La Fille du règiment in the 2010 revival.

In December 2022, French began appearing in Jack and the Beanstalk at the London Palladium.

=== Stand-up comedy ===
In 2014, French toured an autobiographical one woman show 30 Million Minutes in the UK and Oceania. The title is based on the number of minutes she had been alive at the time of producing the show.

In 2022, she toured the UK with a further show titled Dawn French is a Huge Twat. In late 2022 it was announced that she would continue touring the UK with the same show in Autumn 2023, with further shows taking place in Australia in 2024.

=== Advertising ===
French was chosen as the face of Terry's Chocolate Orange, from 1997 until August 2007. She has also been in advertisements for the Churchill Insurance Company.

In 2019, French provided her voice for numerous Station idents for Greatest Hits Radio. This was produced in partnership with Bespoke Music.

In 2021, French was chosen to play the voice of a fairy lady for the Christmas food advertisements for leading retailer Marks and Spencers alongside Tom Holland voicing the company's mascot Percy Pig (who came to life for the first time in 29 years). In the main advert French as the fairy drops her magic wand onto a box covered in Percy pig wrappings, the lid opens and Percy pops out of the box. Throughout the rest of the advertisement she shows Percy all of the items which the retailer was selling for Christmas food.

She later reprised the role for the 2022 M&S Christmas advert, playing alongside Jennifer Saunders voicing a sidekick called 'Duckie'. The pair, in the main advert, go on a journey to fill Duckie with 'some festive cheer' while showing off the M&S Food Christmas range for 2022.

=== Writing ===
French has also written a best-selling epistolary autobiography, which she has titled Dear Fatty. French was paid a £1.5 million advance for the book, which was released in 2008. On an appearance on The Paul O'Grady Show on 6 October 2008, French said that "Fatty" is her nickname for Jennifer Saunders, as a joke about her own size. French said that she became great friends with Saunders well before they started working together, which was "over 30 years ago". The book consists of letters to the different people who have been in her life. In 2017, Me. You. A Diary, French's second non-fiction book, was released. She has also written four novels – A Tiny Bit Marvellous (2010), Oh Dear Silvia (2012), According to Yes (2015) and Because of You (2020). Because of You was longlisted for the 2021 Women's Prize for Fiction. Her third non-fiction book, The Twat Files, tied in to her second stand-up show Dawn French is a Huge Twat, was published in October 2023.

=== Music videos ===
In 1986, she appeared in Kate Bush's music video "Experiment IV" alongside Hugh Laurie, Richard Vernon and Peter Vaughan.

French has appeared in the videos for Alison Moyet's songs "Love Letters" (which also featured Saunders) in 1987 and "Whispering Your Name" in 1994.

She also appeared in two Comic Relief music videos. In 1989 she joined Jennifer Saunders and Kathy Burke to form Lananeeneenoonoo and, along with Bananarama, they created a charity single to raise money for Comic Relief. It was a cover version of The Beatles song "Help!", and was released on the London Records label, entering the UK Singles Chart on 25 February 1989 and reaching a high of No. 3. It remained in the chart for nine weeks.

French, Saunders and Burke returned for Comic Relief in 1997 as "The Sugar Lumps," along with Llewella Gideon and Lulu, to parody The Spice Girls, with whom they performed a version of "Who Do You Think You Are?".

== Politics ==
During the 2010 general election, French was named as a supporter of the Labour Party. She also supported Keir Starmer during the 2020 Labour Party leadership election.

French posted a satirical Instagram video about the Gaza war in June 2025, for which she was criticised of mocking the October 7 attacks that triggered the war. She later apologised and deleted the video, which she acknowledged appeared "one-sided". She said that she never meant to "mock, dismiss, or diminish" the horror of the attacks, though she stuck to her opinion that the war was "nuanced [but not] complicated".

== Personal life ==
French married fellow comedian Lenny Henry in Covent Garden on 20 October 1984. They adopted a daughter named Billie. French has stated that Billie has always known that she was adopted, but once took out an injunction when a biographer came close to revealing the identity of Billie's biological mother. When asked how she and Henry would feel if Billie wanted to find out about her birth mother, French said, "Whatever she wants to do when she's 18, we'll support her. What I do worry about is anyone else making the decision for her." In April 2010, French and Henry announced that they had separated in October 2009 after 25 years of marriage, but would remain friends. Their divorce was finalised later that year.

French began dating charity executive Mark Bignell in 2011, and they were married on 22 April 2013. The couple resided in Fowey until 2021, when they moved to an 1868 Gothic Revival property in Calstock.

In September 2014, French was named as the new Chancellor of Falmouth University.

French is a supporter of her parents' hometown football team Plymouth Argyle. She also supports the Orchid Project, a charity aiming to end female genital mutilation.

== Awards and recognition ==
French and Saunders won the honorary Golden Rose of Montreux award in 2002 and in 2003, she was listed in The Observer as one of the 50 funniest acts in British comedy. In a 2006 poll consisting of 4,000 people, French was named as the most admired female celebrity amongst women in Britain.

In February 2013, she was assessed as one of the 100 most powerful women in the United Kingdom by Woman's Hour on BBC Radio 4.

=== BAFTA Awards ===
- 1989 – Nominated – BAFTA TV Award for Best Light Entertainment Performance in French and Saunders
- 1991 – Nominated – BAFTA TV Award for Best Light Entertainment Performance in French and Saunders
- 1998 – Nominated – BAFTA TV Award for Best Comedy Performance in The Vicar of Dibley
- 2000 – Nominated – BAFTA TV Award for Best Comedy Performance in The Vicar of Dibley
- 2001 – Nominated – BAFTA TV Award for Best Comedy Performance in The Vicar of Dibley
- 2007 – Nominated – BAFTA TV Award for Best Comedy Performance in The Vicar of Dibley
- 2009 – Won – BAFTA Fellowship – awarded with Jennifer Saunders
- 2011 – Nominated – BAFTA TV Award for Best Female Comedy Performance in Roger and Val Have Just Got In

=== British Comedy Awards ===
- 1997 – Won – British Comedy Award for Best TV Comedy Actress in The Vicar of Dibley
- 1998 – Nominated – British Comedy Award for Best TV Comedy Actress in The Vicar of Dibley
- 2011 – Nominated – British Comedy Awards for Best TV Comedy Actress in Psychoville

=== National Television Awards ===
- 1998 – Nominated – National Television Award for Most Popular Comedy Performer in The Vicar of Dibley
- 2000 – Nominated – National Television Award for Most Popular Comedy Performer in The Vicar of Dibley
- 2002 – Nominated – National Television Award for Most Popular Comedy Performance in Ted and Alice
- 2003 – Nominated – National Television Award for Most Popular Comedy Performance in Wild West

=== Other ===
- 1991 – Won – Writers' Guild of Great Britain Award for TV- Light Entertainment in French and Saunders
- 2001 – Along with Jennifer Saunders, declined an OBE
- 2002 – Won – Rose d'Or Light Entertainment Festival Award shared with Jennifer Saunders
- 2009 – Nominated – Annie Award for Voice Acting in a Feature Production for Coraline
- 2025 – Commemorated – Series of British postage stamps issued by Royal Mail, depicting iconic moments and characters from the sitcom The Vicar of Dibley; French appeared on six of the eight stamps

== Acting credits ==
=== Television ===
Year	Title	Role	Notes
1982	The Comic Strip	Various roles	
1982	Five Go Mad in Dorset	George	
1982–1984	The Young Ones	Insane Christian Woman/Mrs Easter Bunny/She-Devil	
1983	Five Go Mad on Mescaline	George	
1985	Happy Families	Cook	
1985–1986	Girls on Top	Amanda Ripley	
1987	The Storyteller	Bad sister	Episode: "Sapsorrow"
1987–2007	French and Saunders	Various roles	
1991–1999	Murder Most Horrid	Various Roles	Anthology
1992	Absolutely Fabulous	Kathy (Interviewer)	Series 1, episode 5 – "Magazine"
1993	Screen One	Elaine Dobbs	Episode: "Tender Loving Care"
1993	The Legends of Treasure Island	Jim Hawkins	Voice; series 1
1994	The Unpleasant World of Penn & Teller	Herself	
1994–2020	The Vicar of Dibley	Geraldine Granger	Leading role
1997	Sex & Chocolate	Bev Bodger	
1999	Let Them Eat Cake	Lisette	
1999	David Copperfield	Mrs Crupp	TV film
2000	Watership Down	Buttercup	Voice; episode 21–22 – "Winter on Watership Down"
2000	French and Saunders Live	Various roles	
2001	The Wheels on the Bus	Narrator	
2002	Ted and Alice	Alice Putkin	
2002–2004	Wild West	Mary	
2006	Agatha Christie's Marple: Sleeping Murder	Janet Erskine	
2006	Dawn French's Girls Who Do Comedy	Herself	
2006	Little Britain Abroad	Shelly Pollard	
2006, 2008–2009	Jam & Jerusalem	Rosie	Clatterford in the US
2007	High Table		
2007	The Meaning of Life		
2007	Dawn French's Boys Who Do Comedy	Herself	
2008, 2011	Lark Rise to Candleford	Caroline Arless	
2009	The Paul O'Grady Show	Guest Host	
2009–2011	Psychoville	Joy Aston	
2010–2012	Roger & Val Have Just Got In	Val Stevenson	
2012	Superstar	Judge	
2013	Heading Out	Frances	
2013–2014	Australia's Got Talent	Judge	
2013–2014	The Wrong Mans	Linda Bourne	
2016–2019	Delicious	Gina	
2017	300 Years of French and Saunders	Various	BBC One Christmas special
2017–2018	Little Big Shots	Presenter	ITV talent show
2020	The Trouble with Maggie Cole	Maggie Cole	ITV series
2020	Cornwall Air 999	Narrator	Documentary series
2020	Roald & Beatrix: The Tail of the Curious Mouse	Beatrix Potter	TV film
2021	RuPaul's Drag Race UK	Guest judge	BBC Three; Series 2, episode 8: "Stoned on the Runway"
2021	The Secret World of...	Narrator	Documentary series
2021	Walk The Line	Judge	ITV musical game show
2022	Red Riding Hood: After Ever After	Twit	Voice
2023	imagine... French & Saunders: Pointed, Bitchy, Bitter	Herself	Documentary
2025	Beddybyes	Gramma Leeba	CBeebies
2026	Can You Keep a Secret?	Debbie Fendon	BBC Series

=== Film ===
Year	Title	Role	Notes
1985	The Supergrass	Andrea	
1987	Eat the Rich	Debbie Draws	
1996	The Adventures of Pinocchio	The Baker's Wife	
1999	Milk	Virginia	
1999	The Comedy Trail: A Shaggy Dog Story	Herself	TV special
2000	Maybe Baby	Charlene	
2004	Harry Potter and the Prisoner of Azkaban	The Fat Lady	
2005	The Chronicles of Narnia: The Lion, the Witch and the Wardrobe	Mrs Beaver	Voice
2006	Love and Other Disasters	Therapist	
2009	Coraline	Miss Miriam Forcible	Voice
2010	Animals United	Angie	Voice
2016	Absolutely Fabulous: The Movie	Kathy (Interviewer)	Also executive producer
2022	Death on the Nile	Mrs Bowers	
2023	The Magician's Elephant	Sister Marie	Voice

=== Theatre and opera ===
Year	Title	Location
1993–1994	Me and Mamie O'Rourke	Strand Theatre, London
	When I was a Girl I used to Scream and Shout	Whitehall Theatre, London
	All Soul's Night	Lyric Theatre, London
1996	Swan Lake	
1997	Then Again	
1997	Side By Side	
2001	A Midsummer Night's Dream	
2003	My Brilliant Divorce	Apollo Theatre, London
2005	Smaller	Lyric Theatre, London
2007	La fille du régiment	Royal Opera House, London
2008–2009	Still Alive	
2014	Thirty Million Minutes	
2018–2019	Snow White at the Palladium	London Palladium
2022–2023	Jack and the Beanstalk	London Palladium
2026	Cinderella	London Palladium

=== Video games ===
Year	Title	Voice role	Notes
2020	Sackboy: A Big Adventure	Scarlet	

== Bibliography ==
Fiction

- A Tiny Bit Marvellous (Penguin, 2010)
- Oh Dear Silvia (Penguin, 2012)
- According to Yes (Penguin, 2015)
- Because of You (Michael Joseph, 2020)

Autobiography

- Dear Fatty (Arrow, 2007)
- Me. You. A Diary (Penguin, 2017)
- The Twat Files (Penguin, 2023)

Comedy

- Girls on Top (with Jennifer Saunders and Ruby Wax) (HarperCollins, 1986)
- A Feast of French and Saunders (with Jennifer Saunders) (Mandarin, 1992)

Other

- Big Knits: Bold, Beautiful, Designer Knitwear (with Sylvie Soudan) (Ebury, 1990)
- Great Big Knits: Over Twenty Designer Patterns (with Sylvie Soudan) (Trafalgar Square, 1993)
- Frigid Women by Sue and Victoria Riches (with a foreword by Dawn French) (Eye Books Direct, 1996)
- Cruising by Beryl Cook (with a foreword by Dawn French) (Victor Gollancz, 2000)

== See also ==
- List of people who have declined a British honour
