= Cassis (disambiguation) =

Cassis is a place in southern France.

Cassis may also refer to:

== People ==
- Ignazio Cassis (born 1961), Swiss physician and politician
- Nancy Cassis (born 1944), American teacher and psychologist
- Tory Cassis, Canadian folk and jazz singer

== Places ==
- Cassis, a suburb of Port Louis, Mauritius

== Food and drink ==
- Cassis AOC, a French Appellation d'origine contrôlée wine region
- Blackcurrant (cassis)
- Crème de Cassis, or Cassis liqueur, a drink made from blackcurrants

== Arts and entertainment ==
- Cassis (film), a 1950 film directed by Jerome Hill

=== Music ===
- Cassis (album), a 2002 album by Yōsui Inoue
- "Cassis" (song), a 2005 song by The Gazette

== Technology ==
- Colour and Stereo Surface Imaging System (CaSSIS), an instrument on the ExoMars Trace Gas Orbiter

== Other uses ==
- Cassis (gastropod), a genus of large sea snails of family Cassidae

== See also ==
- Raisin de Cassis, or Isabella, a grape cultivar
- Cassi (disambiguation)
