= Kassi Manlan =

Ivorian diplomat

Kassi Manlan (1 December 1947 – November 20, 2001) was a World Health Organization representative who was assassinated in Burundi in 2001.

== Career ==
Manlan was a citizen of Côte d'Ivoire, but he resided in Bujumbura, Burundi at the time of his assassination. He had earned a Doctorate of Medicine specializing in hepato-gastroenterology. From 1972 to 1995, he taught at the Faculty of Medicine in Abidjan. During his career, he supervised about 40 doctoral theses in medicine, wrote over fifty medical articles/reports, helped train many doctors, and served as a senior physician in several hospitals. He was a consultant for the World Health Organization (WHO), and joined the organization in 1995. From 1998 to 2001, he was responsible for the Development of Human Resources for Health unit in the World Health Organization Regional Office for Africa. In 2001, three months before his death, he assumed the post of World Health Organization Representative in Burundi.

== Death ==
The badly beaten body of Kassi Manlan was found in the shallows of Lake Tanganyika, near a sailing club, on November 20, 2001. He was killed when he discovered a scam that diverted aid money from the purchase of malaria drugs to private bank accounts.

Thirteen people were convicted of the murder, including Gertrude Nyamoya, a former employee of Kassi Manlan; Gerard Ntunzwenayo, deputy administrator of Burundi's secret service; and Major Emile Manisha, director general of the public security police. All were captured except Lamine Diara, who fled the country and was charged in absentia. The defense claimed former president Pierre Buyoya (an accused war criminal) was involved in a leadership position, but could not present sufficient evidence to charge him. Six of the accused were acquitted in 2008.

Manlan was survived by his wife and four children.

The Fondation MANLAN KASSI's been chaired by Dr Eliane EKRA whose's worked for the Ministry of health in Ivory Coast.
