= Cassey =

Cassey is a feminine given name and a surname, as well as a place name. Cassey may refer to:

== People with the given name Cassey ==
- Cassey Eggelton (born 1952), Cook Islands former politician
- Cassey Ho (born 1987), American social media fitness entrepreneur

== People with the middle name Cassey ==
- Joseph Cassey Bustill (1822–1895), African-American conductor in the Underground Railroad

== People with the surname Cassey ==
- Phill Cassey (born 1974), Global change ecologist
- Amy Matilda Cassey (1809–1856), African-American abolitionist
- Joseph Cassey (1789–1848) African-American abolitionist and businessman
- Peter William Cassey (1831–1917), African-American 19th-century school founder, minister, and abolitionist.

== Other uses ==
- Cassey Compton, hamlet in Withington, Gloucestershire
- Cassey House, historic home located in Society Hill neighborhood, Philadelphia, Pennsylvania

== See also ==
- Cassie, name list
- Kassie (disambiguation)
