= Cassiopeia =

Cassiopeia or Cassiopea may refer to:

== Greek mythology ==
- Cassiopeia (mother of Andromeda), queen of Aethiopia and mother of Andromeda
- Cassiopeia (wife of Phoenix), wife of Phoenix, king of Phoenicia
- Cassiopeia, wife of Epaphus, king of Egypt, the son of Zeus and Io; mother of Libya

== Science ==
- Cassiopeia (constellation), a northern constellation representing the queen of Ethiopia
  - Cassiopeia A, a supernova remnant in that constellation
- Cassiopea, the genus of the "upside-down" jellyfish

== Arts and entertainment ==
=== Film ===
- Cassiopeia (1996 film), a Brazilian CGI film
- Cassiopeia (2022 film), a South Korean film

=== Music ===
- Cassiopeia (TVXQ), the fan club of South Korean boy band TVXQ
- "Cassiopeia", a song by Shabütie (now known as Coheed and Cambria) from their 1999 EP The Penelope EP
- "Cassiopeia", a song by Joanna Newsom from her 2004 album The Milk-Eyed Mender
- "Cassiopeia", a song by Dragonland from their 2006 album Astronomy
- "Cassiopeia", a song by Sunny Lax from his 2006 EP P.U.M.A./Cassiopeia
- "Cassiopeia", a song by Rain from his 2006 album Rain's World
- "Cassiopeia", a song by Sara Bareilles from her 2013 album The Blessed Unrest
- "Cassiopeia", a 2023 single by Bears in Trees

=== Fictional characters ===
- Cassiopeia "Cassie" Sullivan, in The 5th Wave series written by Rick Yancey
- Cassiopeia, a magical tortoise in Michael Ende's fantasy novel Momo
- Cassiopeia (Battlestar Galactica), from the television series Battlestar Galactica
- Cassiopea (Encantadia), the first Queen of Lireo in the Encantadia fantasy series of GMA Network
- Cassiopeia, the mother of Octavian in The Astonishing Life of Octavian Nothing
- Cassiopeia, the organizer and leader of "Operation Starfall" in the Starfall Street storyline in Pokémon Scarlet and Violet

== Other ==
- Casio Cassiopeia, a series of pocket PCs
- Cassiopeia (train), an overnight rail service in Japan
- USS Cassiopeia (AK-75), a cargo ship used by the United States Navy in World War II

== See also ==
- Boast of Cassiopeia
- Casiopea, Japanese jazz fusion group
  - Casiopea (album), the group's 1979 debut album
- Kassiopi, a village in Corfu
