= Health in Ivory Coast =

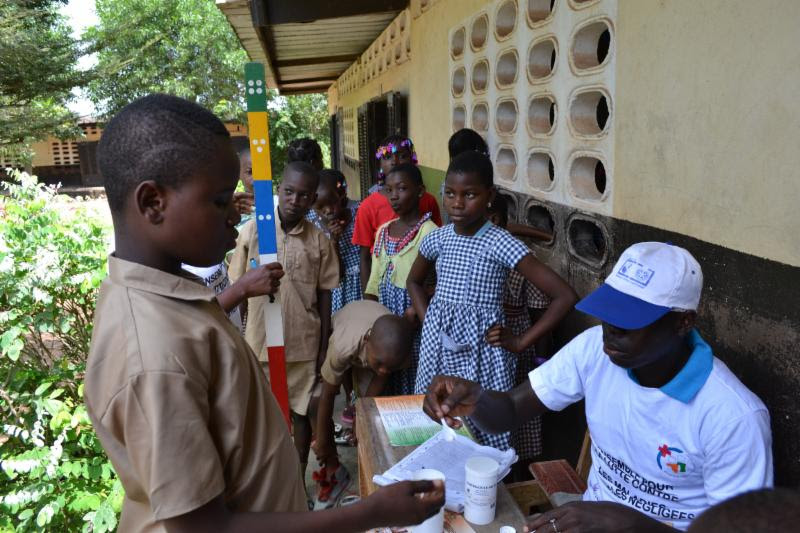
A volunteer distributes medicine to villagers in Aboisso, Ivory Coast.

Ivory Coast faces multiple health challenges, caused by factors including malaria, lack of access to medicine, and healthcare staffing shortages.

== Healthcare ==
As of 2020, the Human Rights Measurement Initiative has found that Ivory Coast is fulfilling 56.2% of what it should be fulfilling for the right to health based on its level of income. When looking at the right to health with respect to children, Ivory Coast was found to provide 79.9% of what is expected based on its current income; amongst the adult population the country achieves only 62%. In terms of reproductive healthcare, the nation was found to meet 26.6% of what the nation is expected to achieve based on the resources (income) it has available.

In the same year, the CIA World Factbook estimated that Ivory Coast spent 3.3% of its GDP on healthcare, and, as of 2019, that there were .016 physicians per 1,000 people.

== Health status ==
Historical development of life expectancy in Ivory Coast

As of 2023, life expectancy in Ivory Coast is estimated to be 60.5 years for men and 65 years for women.

=== Malaria ===
In Ivory Coast, malaria is the leading cause of mortality among children and continues to be the top reason for medical consultations and hospitalizations. Health facilities reported approximately 2.3 million presumed and confirmed malaria cases in 2015. Malaria is endemic throughout Ivory Coast the entire year, with peaks during the rainy season.

Ivory Coast aims to reduce malaria deaths by increasing the proportion of the population sleeping under an insecticide-treated mosquito net, of pregnant women taking sulfadoxine/pyrimethamine, and of cases that get treated in accordance with national guidelines. The strategy includes an emphasis on introducing an integrated approach to community interventions (malaria, pneumonia, and diarrhea) and a more participative and inclusive role for the private sector in combating malaria.

In 2024, the Ivory Coast received the first doses of R21 malaria vaccine from the world’s largest vaccine maker, the Serum Institute of India, in collaboration with the University of Oxford, and began rolling out a new vaccination drive with a total of 656,600 doses to cover 250,000 children aged from newborn to 23 months across 16 regions.

=== HIV/AIDS ===
As of 2022, UNAIDS has estimated that 410,000 Ivorians live with HIV, and that the HIV prevalence rate for adults aged 15-29 is approximately 1.8%.

=== Maternal and child health care ===
The 2020 maternal mortality rate per 100,000 births for Ivory Coast was 480; as of 2023 the mortality rate for infants was 54 out of every 1,000. In 2021, the UN estimated that there were 2.2 midwives for every 10,000 people.

The FGM/C Research Initiative has estimated that 36.7% of Ivorian women between the ages of 15 and 49 have undergone female genital mutilation (as of 2016); it also estimates that 79.4% of the same population opposes the practice. The initiative has also noted a downward trend in the rate of female genital mutilation.

=== Opioid addiction ===
In 2025, tapentadol is an opioid available in Ivory Coast. In Ivory Coast, it is cheap and widely available. In 2025, a BBC world news investigation found that the tapentadol in Ivory Coast was being sourced from pharmaceutical manufacturers in India.

A combination brand sold in Ivory Coast, is “Tramaking”. It is manufactured in India, and contains tapentadol and carisoprodol. Carisoprodol is a muscle relaxant. The two drugs combined, the opiate and the muscle relaxant, can cause convulsions and death. Locally, it is sometimes referred to as “apple”, or “225”.

== Diseases and illness caused by hunger ==
Hunger is also a problem Ivory Coast faces, and it contributes to many diseases. The country's National Development Plan, established in 2016, has sought to develop the economy and has led to drops in food insecurity, though as of 2018 it was estimated that 10.8% of the country still experienced food insecurity. However, malnutrition and its comorbidities do persist, particularly in woman-headed and agricultural households. Many factors contribute to hunger, including climate shocks and lack of access to agricultural resources (particularly for food crop farmers).

== Hospitals ==
There were 1,792 medical facilities in Ivory Coast in 2019.

== See also ==
- Ministry of Health and the Fight against AIDS (Côte d'Ivoire)
- COVID-19 pandemic in Ivory Coast
