= Dawn French's Girls Who Do Comedy =

BBC interview series aired in 2006

- Genre: Talk show
- Presented by: Dawn French
- No. of series: 1

Original release
- Network: BBC Four
- Release: 2006

Related
- Dawn French's Boys Who Do Comedy

Dawn French's Girls Who Do Comedy is an interview series shown on BBC Four, broadcast for one series in 2006. In the series, Dawn French interviewed some of the most prolific comedians of the century, from Phyllis Diller to Catherine Tate and asked about life, love, family and comedy. The series was shown as three episodes featuring clips from French's various interviews with different comedians; however, from 25 to 30 December 2006 BBC Four showed six full interviews, each lasting 20–30 minutes . The interviews were with Whoopi Goldberg, Catherine Tate, Kathy Burke, Julie Walters, Victoria Wood and Joan Rivers. This series also includes one of the last interviews with the late comedian Linda Smith. Each episode ends with a tribute to Linda Smith.

A spin-off series of six half-hour interviews, called Dawn French's More Girls Who Do Comedy, was transmitted on BBC Four.

This was followed by two more series in 2007 by Dawn French's More Boys Who Do Comedy and Dawn French's Boys Who Do Comedy.

== Comedians featured ==
- Catherine Tate
- Julie Walters
- Whoopi Goldberg
- Victoria Wood
- Kathy Burke
- Joan Rivers
- Jennifer Saunders
- Linda Smith
- Wanda Sykes
- Kathy Najimy and Mo Gaffney
- Helen Lederer
- Denise Coffey
- Phyllis Diller
- Jessica Stevenson
- Ruby Wax
- Penny Marshall (only seen in one clip in Episode 1)
- Eleanor Bron
- Sarah Silverman
- Morwenna Banks
- Miriam Margolyes
- Sheila Hancock
- Miss Piggy
- Gina Yashere
- Rita Rudner
- Mel Giedroyc and Sue Perkins
- Margaret Cho
- Tracey Ullman
- Liza Tarbuck
- Sandra Bernhard
- Jenny Eclair
- Laura Solon
- Meera Syal
- Jo Brand
- Jessica Hynes
- Jo Caulfield (Episodes 2–3)
