= Dawn French's Boys Who Do Comedy =

British TV series

Dawn French's Boys Who Do Comedy is a British TV series in which comedian Dawn French interviews her favourite male comedians about how they came to be comedians. It is a follow-up and counterpart to Dawn French's Girls Who Do Comedy.

The full BBC One series consists of three 30-minute programmes with 35 comedians, sewn together as if they were a single discussion. Programme 1 is about how family and early life influenced their careers, programme 2 is about the comedians' early careers, and programme 3 is about the experience of standing on stage in front of an audience. The decision was taken early in the production process to film with three cameras, largely in close up, and with very sparing use of archive material. Each show features only five or six archive clips of a variety of other comedians past and present.

A spin-off series of six half-hour interviews, called Dawn French's More Boys Who Do Comedy, was transmitted on BBC Four, slightly bizarrely before the main BBC One series transmitted. The featured comedians were John Cleese, Graham Norton, Bill Bailey, Rob Brydon, Russell Brand and Ken Dodd.

== Comedians ==
Comics interviewed by Dawn for the main BBC One series include;

- Bill Bailey
- Sanjeev Bhaskar
- Russell Brand
- Rob Brydon
- Jimmy Carr
- Frank Carson
- John Cleese
- Steve Coogan
- Jack Dee
- Hugh Dennis
- Ken Dodd
- Omid Djalili
- Ben Elton
- Noel Fielding
- Lenny Henry
- Charlie Higson
- Eddie Izzard
- Jethro
- Sean Lock
- Matt Lucas
- Jackie Mason
- David Mitchell
- Paul Mooney (Episode 1 only)
- Graham Norton
- Paul O'Grady
- Simon Pegg
- Vic Reeves
- Paul Rodriguez (Episode 3 only)
- Alexei Sayle
- Jimmy Tarbuck
- David Walliams
- Robert Webb
- Paul Whitehouse
- Robin Williams
- Marc Wootton

Comedians featured in clips:

- Episode 1: Richard Pryor, Frankie Howerd, Harpo Marx, Dudley Moore and Peter Cook, Les Dawson and Roy Barraclough, and Ade Edmondson.
- Episode 2: Lenny Bruce, Woody Allen, Steve Martin, Spike Milligan, and Dick Emery.
- Episode 3: George Carlin, Lee Evans, and Wilson, Keppel and Betty
