= Cassandra (name) =

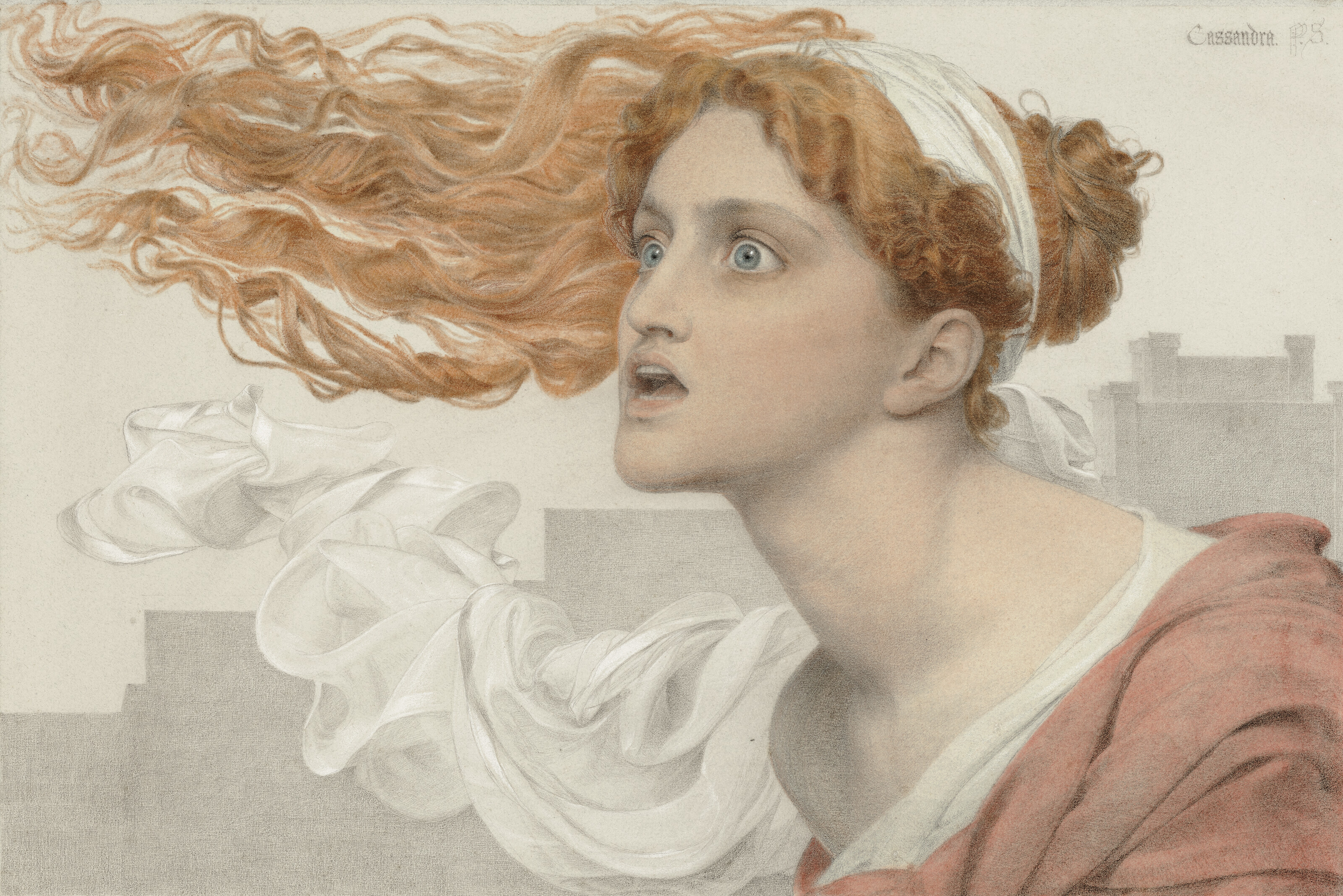
- Cassandra, by Anthony Frederick Augustus Sandys, 1885.
- Pronunciation: /kəˈsændrə/ Ancient Greek: [kasːándra]
- Gender: Female

Origin
- Origin: Greek mythology
- Meaning: the one who shines and excels over men

Other names
- Related names: Casandra, Cassandre, Cassie, Casey, Sandra, Sandy

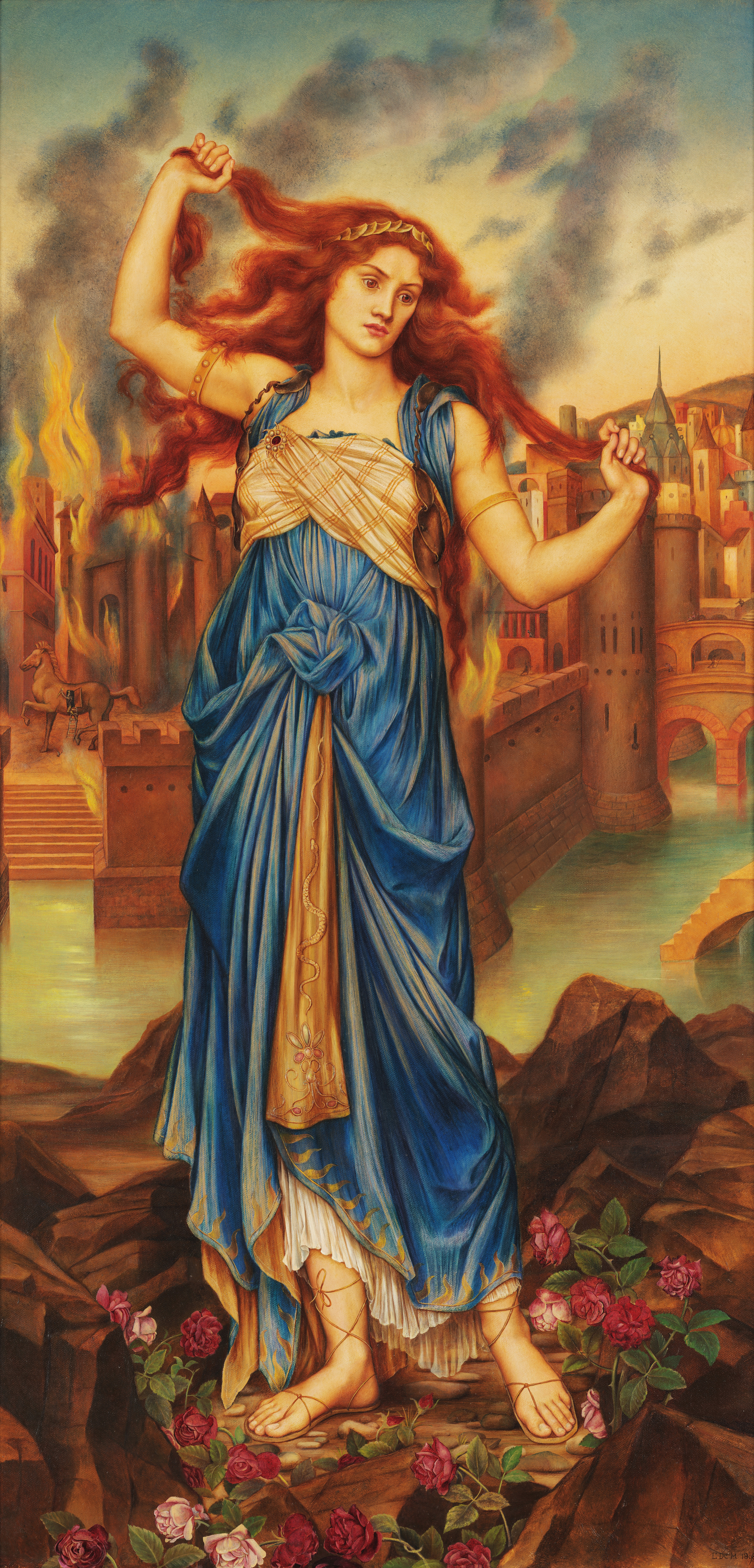
Cassandra by Evelyn De Morgan, ca. 1898.

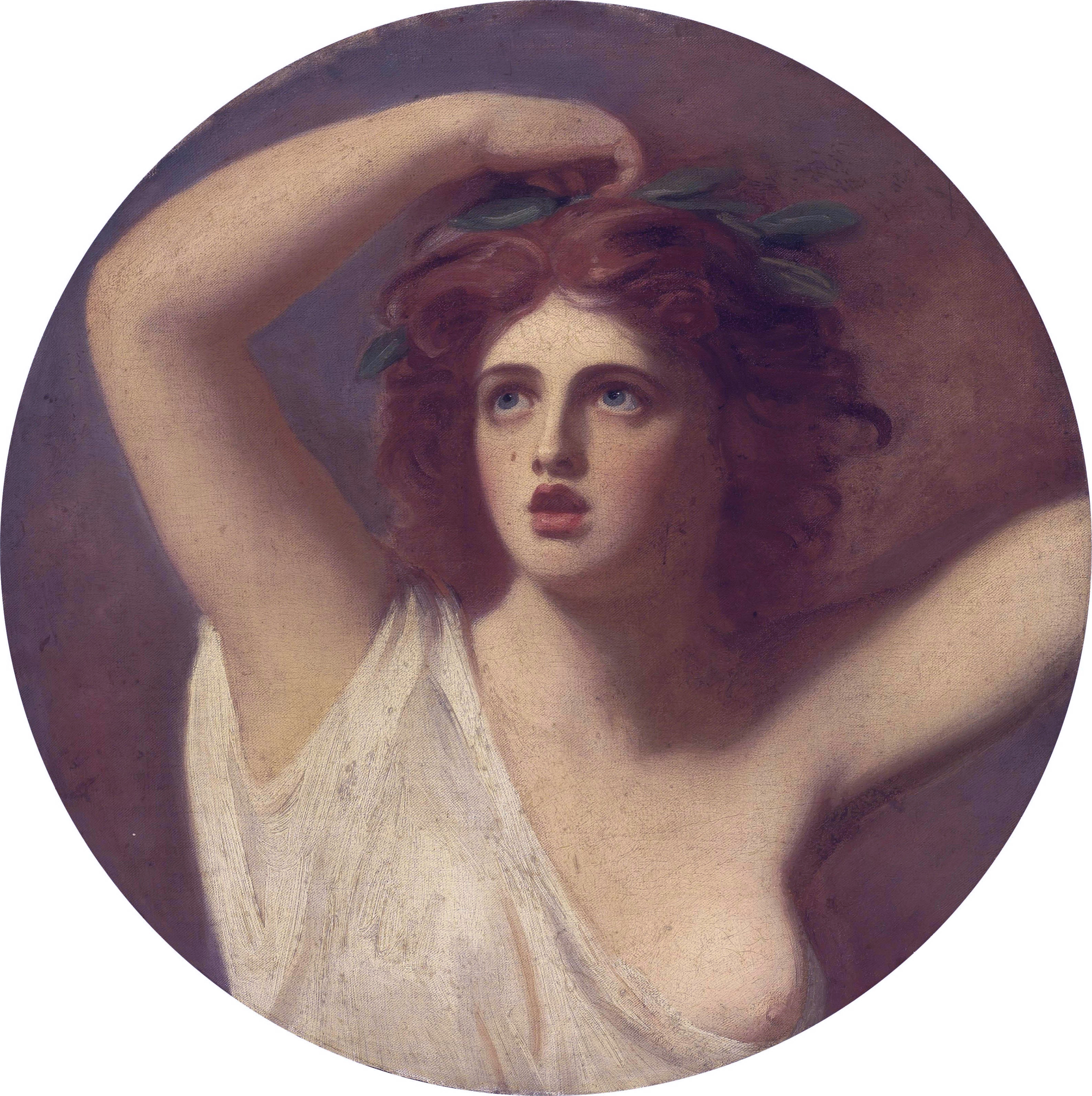
Lady Emma Hamilton as Cassandra by George Romney, 18th century.

Cassandra, also spelled Kassandra, is a feminine given name of Greek origin. Cassander is the masculine form of Cassandra. In Greek mythology, Cassandra (Greek: Κασσάνδρα) was the daughter of King Priam and Queen Hecuba of Troy. She had the gift of prophecy, but was cursed so that none would believe her prophecies. The name has been in occasional use since the Middle Ages. The usual English nickname is Cassie. Cassandre is the French version of the name.

== Usage ==
The name peaked in popularity in the United States in 1990 with more than 7,000 girls named Cassandra born that year. The name remains among the top 1,000 most popular names for newborn American girls but has since declined in use, with about 452 American girls called Cassandra in 2022. Another 188 American newborn girls were called Kassandra that year. There were 456 newborn girls called Cassandra in the United States in 2023 and another 191 called Kassandra.

It is also among the 500 most popular names for newborn girls in Canada, where the name ranked 407th on the popularity chart in 2021 with 75 uses. Another 25 Canadian newborn girls were called Kassandra and another 11 Canadian newborn girls were called Cassandre in 2021. It has been among the 1,000 most used names for newborn girls in England and Wales at different points between 1996 and 2021, when it ranked in 747th place. It is a common name in Greece and countries where Germanic and Romance languages are spoken.

== People ==
- Cassandra Atherton, Australian poet, critic, and scholar
- Cassandra Austen (1773–1845), English artist and elder sister of Jane Austen
- Cassandra Bankson (born 1992), American model, student and YouTube personality
- Cassandre Berdoz, Swiss event manager and Watchman of Lausanne Cathedral
- Cassie Bernall (1981–1999), victim of the Columbine High School massacre
- Cassandra Ciangherotti (born 1987), Mexican actress and producer
- Cassandra Clare (born 1973), American author
- Cassandra Pickett Durham (1824–1885), American physician and the first woman to earn a medical degree in the state of Georgia
- Cassandra Fairbanks (born 1985), American journalist and activist
- Cassie Jaye (born 1986), American actress and film director, known for the movie The Red Pill
- Cassandra Jean (born 1985), American actress, model, and beauty pageant queen
- Cassandra Kelly, Australian company director
- Cassandra Kelly (athlete) (born 1963), athlete from New Zealand
- Cassandra Khaw (born 1984), Malaysian author
- Cassandra Laing (1968–2007), Australian artist
- Cassandra Lee Morris (born 1982), American voice actress
- Cassandra Lynn (1979–2014), American model
- Cassandra Mayes, American politician
- Cassy O'Connor (born 1967), Australian politician
- Cassandra Peterson (born 1951), American actress
- Cassandra Ponti (born 1982), Filipino TV contestant
- Cassandra Potter (born 1981), American curler
- Cassandre Prosper (born 2005), Canadian basketball player
- Cassandra Quave (born 1978), American ethnobotanist, herbarium curator, and professor
- Cassandra Salguero (2003–2024), Mexican beach soccer player
- Cassie Scerbo (born 1990), American actress, singer and dancer
- Cassie Steele (born 1989), Canadian actress
- Cassandra Steen (born 1980), German singer
- Cassandra Szoeke, Australian medical researcher
- Cassandra Tate (born 1990), American athlete
- Cassandra Thorburn (born 1971), Australian children's author
- Cassandra Trenary, American ballet dancer
- Cassie Ventura (born 1986), American singer
- Cassandra Whitehead (born 1985), American model and beauty pageant titleholder
- Cassandra Williams, Dominican politician
- Cassandra Wilson (1955–2026), American jazz singer
- Regina Cassandra (born 1990), Indian actress

== Fictional characters ==
- Cassandra (Doctor Who), from the British science fiction television series
- Cassandra (Encantadia), in Etheria
- Cassandra (Stargate), in the American science fiction television series Stargate
- Cassie Ainsworth, in the television series Skins
- Cassandra Alexandra, Grecian character from the Soul series of fighting games
- Cassie Cage, Mortal Kombat character
- Cassandra Cain, one of the Batgirls in the DC Comics Universe
- Cassie Chan, pink ranger from Power Rangers Turbo and Power Rangers In Space
- Cassandra Foster, on the American soap opera All My Children
- Cassandra Freedman, on the Australian soap opera Neighbours
- Cassie Hack, in the Hack/Slash comic books
- Cassandra "Casey" Jones, a character in the Rise of the Teenage Mutant Ninja Turtles
- Cassandra Lang, in the Marvel Comics universe
- Cassandra Nova, Marvel supervillainess and the archenemy of Charles Xavier
- Cassie Palmer, in the Cassandra Palmer novel series
- Cassandra Pentaghast, in the Dragon Age franchise
- Cassandra Rawlins, from the American soap opera The Young and the Restless
- Wonder Girl (Cassie Sandsmark), the current Wonder Girl in the DC Comics Universe
- Cassandra Spender, Patient X from The X-Files
- Cassandra Trotter (née Parry), in the British sitcom Only Fools and Horses
- Cassie Turner, on the Australian soap opera Home and Away
- Cassie Layne Winslow, from the American daytime soap opera Guiding Light
