= Cassandra (disambiguation) =

Cassandra is a prophetess in Greek mythology who was blessed with foresight but cursed, never to be believed.

Cassandra may also refer to:

== Arts and entertainment ==
=== Music ===
- Cassandra (album), a 1997 album by Zoar
- Cassandra (Andra Day album), 2024
- "Cassandra" (Sherbet song), 1973
- "Cassandra" (ABBA song), 1982
- "Cassandra" (Theatre of Tragedy song), 1998
- "Cassandra" (Taylor Swift song), 2024
- "Cassandra", a 2014 song by Thomas Bergersen from Sun
- "Cassandra, a 2022 song by Florence + the Machine from Dance Fever

=== Other arts ===
- "Cassandra" (short story), a 1978 short story by C. J. Cherryh
- Cassandra (novel), a 1984 novel by Christa Wolf
- Cassandra (film), a 1987 Australian horror film
- "Cassandra" (Red Dwarf), a 1999 episode of the television series Red Dwarf
- Cassandra: Warrior Angel, a 2013 Filipino television series
- Cassandra (TV series), a 2025 German science fiction series

== People and fictional characters ==
- Cassandra (name), a given name (including a list of persons and characters with that name)
- Cassandra (mythology), various uses of the name in Greek mythology
- João Paulo Cassandra (born 1961), São Toméan politician
- José Cassandra (born 1964), São Toméan politician
- William Connor or Cassandra (1909–1967), British journalist
- Cassandra (Doctor Who), a character in the television series Doctor Who

== Places ==
- Cassandra, Georgia, an unincorporated community
- Cassandra, Pennsylvania, a borough in United States
- Cassandreia, Greece, sometimes spelled "Cassandra"

== Other uses ==
- HMS Cassandra, various Royal Navy ships
- Cassandra (metaphor), a term used in situations in which valid warnings or concerns are dismissed or disbelieved
- Apache Cassandra, a NoSQL database management system previously developed by Facebook
- Project Cassandra, a stymied DEA-led effort to undercut Hezbollah funding from illicit drug sources

== See also ==
- , including people with the first name Cassandra
- Cassandre (artist) (1901–1968), pseudonym of the French graphic designer Adolphe Jean Marie Mouron
- Kassandra (disambiguation)
- Cassie (disambiguation)
