= Eliane Ekra =

Ivorian politician

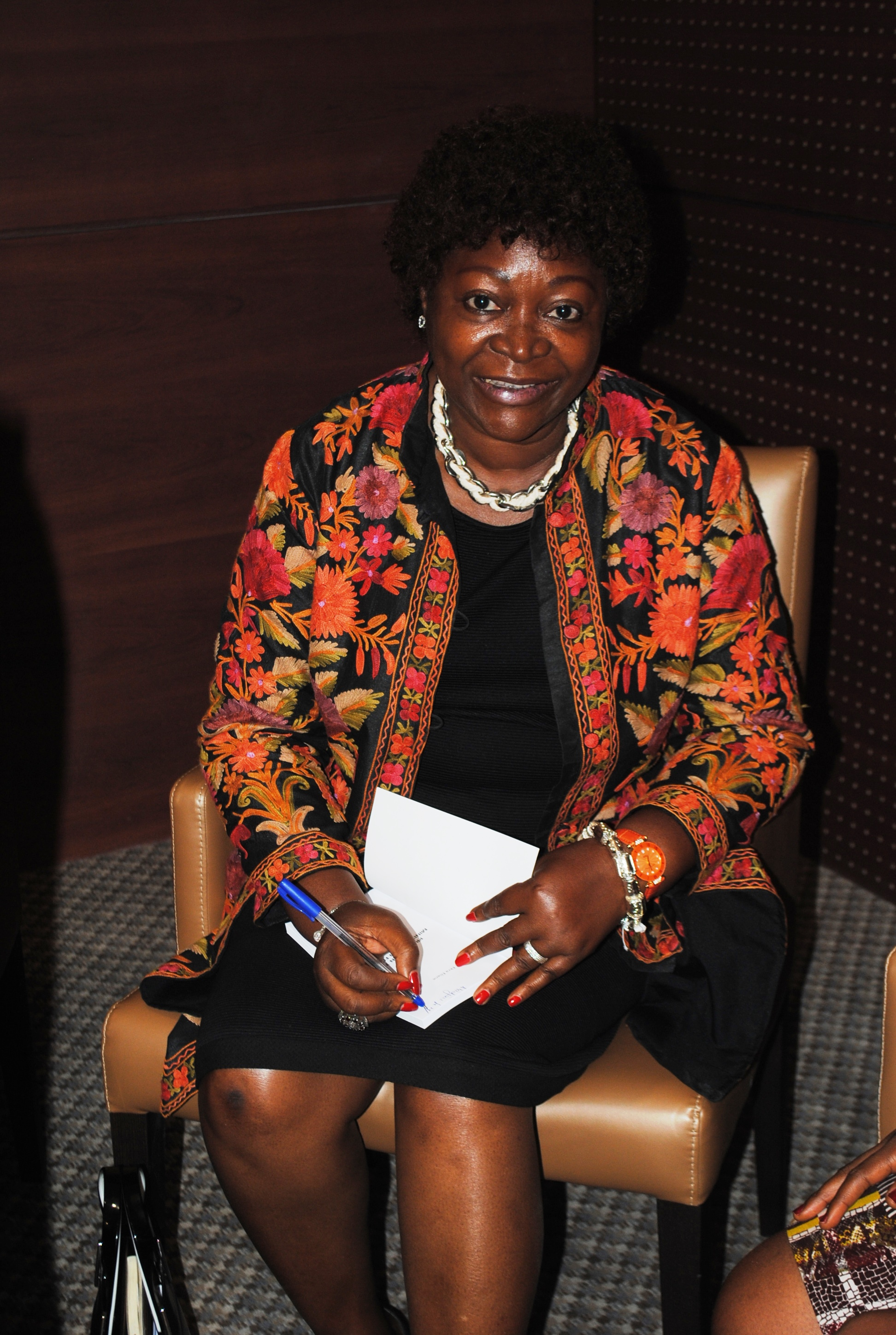
Eliane Ekra

Eliane Ekra was Chief of the Ministry of Health and AIDS Control in the Republic of the Ivory Coast from 2013 to 2018.

Ekra is on the board of directors of the MTN Foundation. She was awarded the 2014 Harambee Spain Award for the Promotion and Equality of African Women.

In March 2023, Ekra was appointed president of the regional working group on health risk coverage (GTR-CRM) .
