= Paper fortune teller =

Origami toy used for children's games

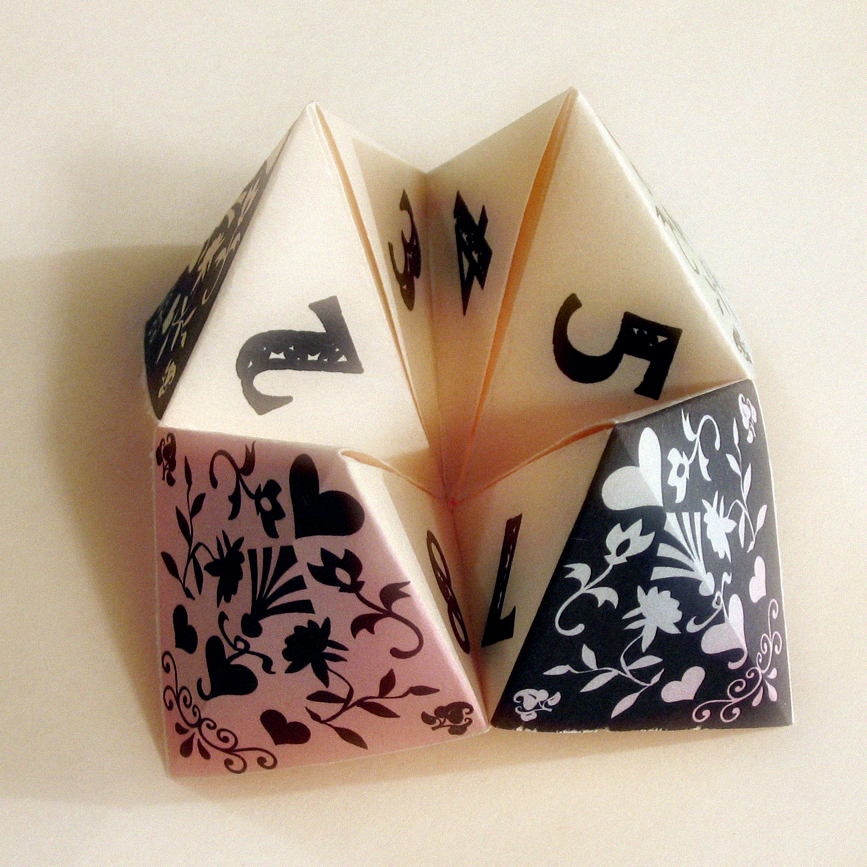
An elaborately decorated fortune teller

A fortune teller is a form of origami used in children's games. Parts of the fortune teller are labelled with colors or numbers that serve as options for a player to choose from, and on the inside are eight flaps, each concealing a message. The person operating the fortune teller manipulates the device based on the choices made by the player, and finally one of the hidden messages is revealed. These messages may purport to answer questions (hence the name), or they may be activities that the player must perform.

The same shape may also be used as pincers or as a salt cellar. Another name for it is a cootie catcher; it has many other names.

== Construction ==
A paper fortune teller may be constructed by the steps shown in the illustration below:

1. The corners of a sheet of paper are folded up to meet the opposite sides and (if the paper is not already square) the top is cut off, making a square sheet with diagonal creases.
2. The four corners of the square are folded into the center, forming a shape known in origami terminology as a blintz base or cushion fold. The resulting smaller square is turned over, and the four corners are folded in a second time.
3. All four corners are folded up so that the points meet in the middle, and the pockets of paper in each of the four corners are pulled away from the center.

== Telling fortunes ==
To use the fortune teller, the person telling the fortunes holds four fingers in the four corners of the paper, keeping two pairs of corners together and the other two pairs separated so that only half of the internal sides of the corners are visible. This may be done with index fingers and thumbs of two hands, or with the thumb and three fingers of one hand.

Manipulations are done by various similar methods. In a common method, the player asks a question of the person holding the fortune teller; this question will be answered by the device. The holder then asks for a number or color. Once the number or color is chosen, the holder uses their fingers to switch between the two groups of colors and numbers inside the fortune teller. The holder switches these positions a number of times, determined by the number of letters in the color selected, the number originally chosen, or the sum of both. Once the holder has finished switching the positions of the fortune teller, the player chooses one of the flaps revealed. These flaps often have colors or numbers on them. The holder then lifts the flap and reveals the fortune underneath. Steps may be repeated to suit the users.

== Other uses ==
Instead of being used to tell fortunes, these shapes may be used as a pincer to play-act catching bugs such as lice, hence the "cootie catcher" name. This usage has also inspired the design of a similarly shaped gripper in soft robotics.

As a salt cellar, the same shape stands on a table with the four points downward; the four open pockets may be used to hold small pieces of food.

Several fine artists have been inspired by this form:

- "Frog pond plop (Opening 6)", a concrete poem by Sylvester Houédard translating the most famous haiku of Matsuo Bashō, was formatted as a paper fortune teller (with pictorial instructions) by Edward Wright, Nazli Zaki, and Matilda Cheung, and published in a numbered edition in 1965 by Houédard's Openings Press. The outside and two inside surfaces of the fortune teller are decorated with the words "frog", "pond", and "plop", each spelled with one letter on each point of the fortune teller.
- "Fortune Teller (it will all end in stars)", a large photorealistic pencil drawing by Australian artist Cassandra Laing (2007), depicts two hands holding closed a paper fortune teller decorated with an astronomical theme and foretelling Laing's soon-to-come death from breast cancer.
- "Unfolding Lives", a monumental sculpture in the form of a paper fortune teller by Judith Forrest and Terri-ann White (2010), at the Perth Cultural Centre, forms a memorial to the Forgotten Australians, institutionalized Australian children. After protests over its 2016 removal for museum renovations, it was restored and reinstalled near its original location in 2023.
- In 2018, over 10,000 illuminated red and yellow copies of this shape were used to create an installation resembling lava pouring from a building window, titled "ORIGAMI LAVA" (David Oliva + Anna Juncà), for the Lluèrnia festival in Olot, Spain.
- British installation artist Leonie Bradley's "Swarm" (2022) envisions masses of fortune tellers, folded from yellow and black paper, as a swarm of bees, and invites participants to fold their own bees as a reminder "to think about chance versus decision and the positive climate futures we can choose to create". The same artwork has also been featured in fundraising events for Bees for Development.

== History ==
Central European baptismal certificates from the 17th and 18th centuries were often folded in the same doubly blintzed pattern as the flat base for the fortune teller, before its points are folded together.

Koshiro Hatori has suggested that the fortune teller shape is originally European, rather than Japanese, but its exact origin is unclear. Origami historian David Mitchell has found many 19th-century European sources mentioning a paper "salt cellar" or "pepper pot" (the latter often folded slightly differently). The first of these to unambiguously depict the paper fortune teller is an 1876 German book for children. It appears again, with the salt cellar name, in several other publications in the 1880s and 1890s in New York and Europe. Mitchell also cites a 1907 Spanish publication describing a guessing game similar to the use of paper fortune tellers. The use of this shape as a paper fortune-teller in England has been recorded since the 1950s. Martin Gardner included this fold, described as both a bug catcher and fortune-teller, in a column in Hugard's Magic Monthly, titled "Encyclopedia of Impromptu Magic", in the 1950s. Although the phrase "cootie catcher" has been used with other meanings in the U.S. for much longer, the use of the phrase for paper cootie catchers in the U.S. dates back at least to the 1960s. As well as being called a salt cellar, fortune teller, or cootie catcher, the same origami shape has also been called a "bugcatcher", "chatterbox", "whirlybird", or "paku-paku" (a Japanese phrase for gobbling that also lent its name to Pac-Man).
