= Cassandra Laing =

Australian artist

- Born: 1968
- Died: 2007 (aged 38–39)
- Known for: Drawing

Cassandra Laing (1968–2007) was an Australian artist from Melbourne whose best-known works are large photorealistic pencil drawings with themes of death, transience, astronomy, heredity, and origami.

== Life ==
Laing was born in Melbourne in 1968.

She was diagnosed with breast cancer in 2006, after her older sister Amanda and a grandmother had already died of the disease. She turned to pencil drawing because painting had become too difficult for her, using her concentration on her work as an escape from the pain of her cancer.

She died on 22 September 2007, in Melbourne.

== Works ==
Laing listed Vija Celmins as an inspiration for her own work, which included the following.

- "A Charmed Life" is a drawing of a charm bracelet she had shared with her sister, and "Shadow Monkeys" is another fictional charm bracelet decorated with monkeys, in reference to works on the theory of evolution by Richard Dawkins. "Shadow Monkeys" was a finalist for the 2006 Dobell Drawing Prize.
- "Darwin's Girls" depicts a dead finch on top of a photograph of Laing and her sister as young girls. The finch is a reference to Darwin's finches, Darwin's theory of natural selection, and the inherited tendency for cancer that would eventually kill Laing.
- "Fortune teller (it will all end in stars)" shows Laing's hands holding a paper fortune teller decorated with the Andromeda Galaxy, recalling childhood games with her sister and foretelling her own death.
- "My Paper Ancestors" repeats the finch from "Darwin's Girls", with a paper dinosaur, a reference to "extinction on a larger scale". Similarly, "Last Migration" features origami pteranodons, flying above images of Antarctica by Frank Hurley.
- "No Time to Waste" is a drawing of an origami star decorated with stars.
- "Stargazer" depicts Eleanor Arroway, the main character of the 1997 film Contact (as played by Jodie Foster) with the universe spread behind her, on a crumpled and unfolded sheet of origami paper.

Regarding the themes of astronomy and origami in her works, Laing stated "I found it more comforting to think of stars being born and dying and us being dragged into that cosmic sort of force ... the less significant I felt, the more happy I was. I can sit here and fold this star, but that's about all I can control. Time runs out."

== Exhibits and collections ==
A solo exhibit of Laing's astronomical paintings, Amanda Nebula, was held at the George Paton Gallery of the University of Melbourne in 2002.

Laing's works have been featured in the group shows Shared Sky at the National Gallery of Victoria in 2009, I walk the line : new Australian drawing at the Museum of Contemporary Art Australia in 2009, and Namedropping at the Museum of Old and New Art in Hobart in 2024–2025.

Her work "Darwin’s Girls" is in the collection of the Museum of Old and New Art. "The Quiet Cretaceous" is in the collection of the Art Gallery of Ballarat.
