= Cassandra, Georgia =

Unincorporated community in Georgia, U.S.

Coordinates: 34°47′03″N 85°23′53″W

Cassandra is an unincorporated community in Walker County, in the U.S. state of Georgia.

== History ==
A post office called Cassandra was established in 1855, and remained in operation until it was discontinued in 1950. The community was named after the Cassandra, the ship an early settler had traveled in on a transatlantic voyage. An early variant name was "Hiniard's Crossroad".
