= HMS Cassandra =

Three ships of the Royal Navy have been named HMS Cassandra after Cassandra, a priestess in Greek mythology. A fourth was planned, but never completed:

- HMS Cassandra was to have been a 36-gun fifth rate. She was ordered in 1782 but cancelled later that year.
- HMS Cassandra (1806) was a 10-gun cutter launched in 1806. She foundered in 1807.
- HMS Cassandra (1916) was a C-class light cruiser launched in 1916 and sunk by a mine in 1918.
- HMS Cassandra (R62) was a C-class destroyer, originally planned as HMS Tourmaline but renamed in 1942 and launched in 1943. She was scrapped in 1967.
