= Cassis (album) =

Studio album by Yōsui Inoue
- Released: July 24, 2002
- Recorded: 1996–2002
- Genres: Folk rock, adult contemporary
- Length: 47:00
- Label: Forlife Music Entertainment
- Producer: Yōsui Inoue

Yōsui Inoue chronology
United Cover (2001)	Cassis (2002)	Blue Selection (2002)

Singles from Cassis
- 1. "Kono Yo no Sadame" Released: November 21, 2001; 2. "Final Love Song" Released: April 3, 2002; 3. "Mori Hana Shojo Rin" Released: August 21, 2002

Cassis is the 20th solo studio album by Japanese singer-songwriter Yōsui Inoue, released in July 2002.

The album includes "Kimerareta Rhythm", which was featured on the Academy Award-nominated motion picture The Twilight Samurai, directed by Yoji Yamada. The song "You are the Top" was originally contributed to the same-titled musical by Kōki Mitani. Two singles were cut from the album: "Kono Yo no Sadame" and "Final Love Song"; both songs were featured on the TV advertisings of Kirin Beverage starring Inoue himself.

== Track listing ==
All songs written and composed by Yōsui Inoue, unless otherwise indicated

1. "Imitation Complex (イミテーション・コンプレックス, Imitēshon Konpurekkusu)" - 4:23
2. "Kono Yo no Sadame (この世の定め)" - 5:00
3. "Final Love Song" - 4:25
4. "Television (テレビジョン, Terebijon)" - 4:28
5. "Koi no Express (恋のエキスプレス, Koi no Ekisupuresu)" - 6:18
6. "Mori Hana Shojo Rin (森花処女林)" - 3:19
7. "Punky Rockabilly (パンキー・ロカビリー, Pankī Rokabirī)" (Inoue/Natsumi Hirai) - 3:10
8. "Kekkyoku Ame ga Furu (結局 雨が降る)" (Inoue/Hirai) - 2:28
9. "You are the Top" (Inoue/Hirai/Kōki Mitani) - 4:28
10. "Tokai no Ame (都会の雨)" - 4:47
11. "Kimerareta Rhythm (決められたリズム, Kimerareta Rizumu)" - 4:13

== Personnel ==
- Yōsui Inoue - vocals, acoustic guitar, electric guitar, hand-claps
- Tsuyoshi Kon - electric guitar, acoustic guitar
- Haruo Kubota - electric guitar
- Takayuki Hijikata - electric guitar
- Tsuneo Imabori - electric guitar, acoustic guitar, computer programming
- Chiharu Mikuzuki - electric bass, uplight bass, 12-string guitar
- Masafumi Minato - drums
- Hideo Yamaki - drums
- Matarou Misawa - percussion
- Yahiro Tomohiro - percussion
- Nobuo Kurata - acoustic piano
- Natsumi Hirai - acoustic piano
- Yasuharu Nakanishi - acoustic piano, electric piano
- Yoshiki Kojima - acoustic piano, keyboards, organ
- Yūta Saitō - acoustic piano, keyboards
- Masao Ōmura - keyboards
- Banana U-G - keyboards, computer programming
- Kazuya Miyazaki - computer programming
- Tetsuo Ishikawa - computer programming
- Yōichi Murata - trombone, bass trombone
- Kōji Nishimura - trumpet
- Shirou Sasaki - trumpet
- Masahiko Sugasaka - trumpet
- Takuo Yamamoto - saxophone
- Bob Zang - saxophone
- Masakuni Takeno - saxophone
- Udai Shike - cello
- Jun - background vocals
- Chie Nagai - background vocals

== Chart positions ==
=== Album ===
Year	Chart	Position	Sales
2002	Japanese Oricon Weekly Albums Chart (Top 100)	12	73,000

=== Singles ===
Year	Single	B-Side(s)	Chart	Position	Sales
2001	"Kono Yo no Sadame"	"Kegani", "Kyoto Tabemono Jijou"	Japanese Oricon Weekly (top 100)	60	7,000
2002	"Final Love Song"	"Yagi no Milk"	Japanese Oricon Weekly (top 100)	43	8,000
2002	"Mori Hana Shojo Rin"	"Kimerareta Rhythm"	Japanese Oricon Weekly (top 100)	—	—
