= USS Cassiopeia =

Cargo ship of the United States Navy

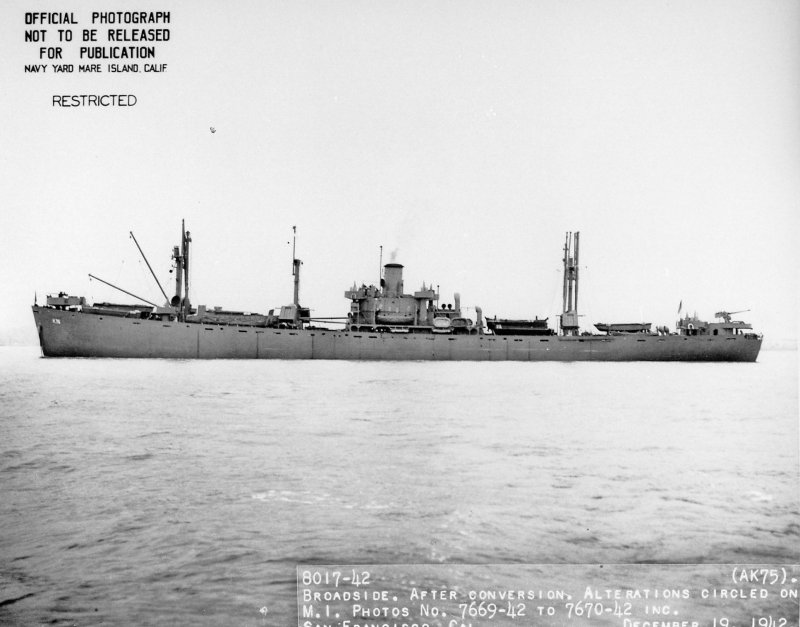
- Broadside view of USS Cassiopeia (AK-75) off San Francisco, 19 December 1942.

History

United States
- Name: Melville W. Fuller; Cassiopeia
- Namesake: Melville W. Fuller; The constellation Cassiopeia
- Ordered: as a Type EC2-S-C1 hull, MCE hull 504
- Builder: Permanente Metals Corporation, Richmond, California
- Cost: $1,124,481
- Yard number: 504
- Way number: 2
- Laid down: 13 October 1942
- Launched: 15 November 1942
- Sponsored by: Mrs. C. F. Calhoun
- Acquired: 27 November 1942
- Commissioned: 8 December 1942
- Decommissioned: 21 November 1945
- Stricken: 5 December 1945
- Identification: Hull symbol: AK-75; Code letters: NYLN
- Honours and awards: 1 × battle star
- Fate: Expended as a target 28 June 1961

General characteristics
- Class & type: Crater-class cargo ship
- Type: Type EC2-S-C1
- Displacement: 4,023 long tons (4,088 t) (standard); 14,550 long tons (14,780 t) (full load)
- Length: 441 ft 6 in (134.57 m)
- Beam: 56 ft 11 in (17.35 m)
- Draft: 28 ft 4 in (8.64 m)
- Installed power: 2 × Oil fired 450 °F (232 °C) boilers, operating at 220 psi (1,500 kPa) , (manufactured by Babcock & Wilcox); 2,500 shp (1,900 kW)
- Propulsion: 1 × Vertical triple-expansion reciprocating steam engine, (manufactured by Hooven-Owens-Rentschler); 1 × screw propeller
- Speed: 12.5 kn (23.2 km/h; 14.4 mph)
- Capacity: 7,800 t (7,700 long tons) DWT; 444,206 cu ft (12,578.5 m^{3}) (non-refrigerated)
- Complement: 195
- Armament: 1 × 5 in (127 mm)/38 caliber dual-purpose (DP) gun; 1 × 3 in (76 mm)/50 caliber DP gun; 2 × 40 mm (1.57 in) Bofors anti-aircraft (AA) gun mounts; 6 × 20 mm (0.79 in) Oerlikon cannon AA gun mounts

USS Cassiopeia (AK-75) was a Crater-class cargo ship in the service of the US Navy in World War II. She was the only ship of to bear this name. She is named after the Northern Hemisphere constellation Cassiopeia.

== Construction ==
Cassiopeia was launched 15 November 1942 as liberty ship SS Melville W. Fuller by Permanente Metals Corporation, Richmond, California, under a Maritime Commission (MARCOM) contract, MCE hull 504; sponsored by Mrs. C. F. Calhoun; acquired by the Navy 27 November 1942; and commissioned 8 December 1942.

== Service history ==
Cassiopeia sailed from San Francisco 21 December 1942 with cargo for Nouméa, where she arrived 12 January 1943. From this base, she offered essential support to the operations in the consolidation of the northern Solomons, carrying the varied necessities of war throughout the South Pacific. Between 19 June and 11 July, the cargo ship voyaged to Auckland, New Zealand, to reload, then returned with voyages from Nouméa to Guadalcanal until 9 August. Another resupply mission and a brief repair period in New Zealand preceded her resumption of South Pacific operations in November.

This pattern of ferrying vital supplies in the South Pacific alternating with voyages to New Zealand to reload continued until 6 June 1945, when Cassiopeia cleared Auckland for San Francisco, the Panama Canal Zone, and Norfolk, where she arrived 25 October.

== Decommissioning ==
The cargo ship was decommissioned 21 November 1945, and transferred to MARCOM for disposal the same day.

== Final disposition ==
Cassiopeia was laid up in the National Defense Reserve Fleet, James River Group, Virginia, on 21 November 1945.

On 21 June 1961, the Navy requested her for testing purposes, on 27 June 1961, she was transferred back to the Navy to be used as a target by Cutlass, in the VACAPES area.

== Awards ==
Cassiopeia received one battle star for World War II service.

== Bibliography ==
- "Cassiopeia". Dictionary of American Naval Fighting Ships. Naval History and Heritage Command. This article incorporates text from this source, which is in the public domain.
- "Kaiser Permanente No. 1, Richmond CA". ShipbuildingHistory.com. 13 October 2010.
- "USS Cassiopeia (AK-75)". NavSource. 4 April 2014.
- "MELVILLE W. FULLER". United States Department of Transportation. Archived from the original on 12 December 2019.
- "SS MELVILLE W. FULLER".
