= Cassie Hager =

American basketball player

Personal information
- Born: January 17, 1984 (age 42) Perry, Iowa, U.S.
- Listed height: 6 ft 7 in (2.01 m)

Career information
- High school: Perry (Perry, Iowa)
- College: Northern Iowa (2002–2006)
- Position: Center

Career highlights
- MVC Defensive Player of the Year (2006); 2x MVC All-Defensive Team (2005, 2006); 2x First-team All-MVC (2005, 2006)

Cassandra Hager-Smith (born January 17, 1984) is an American former college basketball player. She is the only player in the history of the University of Northern Iowa to record than 1,000 career points and 1,000 rebounds.

== Career ==
Cassandra Hager was born on January 17, 1984, in Perry, Iowa, to Daniel Hager and Michelle Hager. Her Siblings are Katrina and Caley.

=== Perry High School ===
Hager says she didn't start playing basketball until she was in 5th grade.

She attended high school in Perry, Iowa, where she was named first team all-state in her junior and senior years and twice earned Des Moines Sunday Register first-team all-state honors. In her last two seasons she averaged more than 20 points a game.

In Hager's senior year, Perry won the state Class 3-A championship. She graduated in 2002.

== College highlights ==
In her senior year, Hager was the second leading shot-blocker in Division I, averaging 4.3 blocks per game.

- Missouri Valley Conference Defensive Player of the Year (2006)
- All-MVC First Team (2006, 2005)
- MVC All-Defensive Team (2005)
- MVC All-Tournament Team (2006, 2005)
- All-time MVC career leader
- Only player in UNI history to record 1,000 career points and rebounds

== Northern Iowa statistics ==
Legend
GP	Games played	GS	Games started	MPG	Minutes per game
FG%	Field goal percentage	3P%	3-point field goal percentage	FT%	Free throw percentage
RPG	Rebounds per game	APG	Assists per game	SPG	Steals per game
BPG	Blocks per game	PPG	Points per game	**Bold**	Career high

Year	Team	GP	Points	FG%	3P%	FT%	RPG	APG	SPG	BPG	PPG
2002–03	Northern Iowa	24	57	**64.7**	–	44.8	2.5	0.2	0.2	1.0	2.4
2003–04	Northern Iowa	23	117	57.0	–	75.0	2.7	0.2	0.2	2.2	5.1
2004–05	Northern Iowa	**31**	413	55.6	**39.1**	80.2	5.7	0.7	**0.6**	**4.4**	13.3
2005–06	Northern Iowa	30	**476**	51.7	26.7	**83.2**	**6.6**	**1.5**	0.5	4.3	**15.9**
Career	Northern Iowa	108	1063	54.4	33.3	78.1	4.6	0.7	0.4	3.1	9.8
