= Cassandra Kelly =

Australian advisor, speaker and company director

Cassandra Kelly AM
- Born: Cassandra Leigh Kelly; Sydney, Australia
- Education: University of Sydney
- Occupations: Founder, CChange and Pottinger
- Website: Cassandra Kelly website

Cassandra Kelly AM is an international advisor, speaker, and company director. She is a founding member of the European Union's Global Tech Panel, and Chair of Treasury Corporation of Victoria. She is co-founder of Pottinger and Atomli Inc. Her thinking on disruption, diversity, philanthropy, and business leadership has been featured in articles, speeches and books. She is founder of the WomanUp program providing coaching to aspiring executive women.

== Early life and education ==
Cassandra was born in Sydney, Australia. She attended the University of Sydney and received a Bachelor in Economics (Honours in Finance), with a major in Commercial Law / Accounting. Her Honours year focused on finance and the economics of developing nations and economics.

== Executive career ==
After working as a fund manager, she was hired by McKinsey & Company and moved to Johannesburg, where she was one of the early founders of the global risk management practice. Following that, she worked at HSBC in London and then Deutsche Bank where she was based in New York City, leading investment into early fintech/online platforms such as Tradeweb, Market Axess and Creditex.

In 2001 she was hired as the Vice President of GMAC Commercial Mortgage Asia, based in Tokyo.

She founded Pottinger in 2003, a global advisory business, with Nigel Lake. She was initially CEO and then became global chair of Pottinger. She developed Pottinger's proprietary "destination-led strategy" which is used by leaders in business and government. Business Spectator reported that Cassandra drives a responsible and ethical business culture through recruitment of individuals "with a true understanding of what feels correct, ethical, decent, humane, authentic behavior. People who have the courage to say 'no' to clients".

== Board appointments ==
In August 2015, Cassandra was appointed as Chairperson of Treasury Corporation Victoria, the central financing authority for the State of Victoria, established by an Act of the Victorian Parliament, having previously been appointed as Deputy Chairperson in 2015.

In 2022, Cassandra was appointed as Chair of FutureFeed commercializing global decarbonization solutions for reducing methane emissions in ruminant animals. Awards include Bloomberg New Energy Award and Food Planet Prize.

Previous board appointments include:

- 2017 - Chair of the NYC-based technology startup Atomli Inc
- 2017 - Chair, Livetiles
- 2014 - Director of Flight Centre Travel Group
- 2014 - Chair, Allpress Espresso International
- 2010 - Director, University of New South Wales Foundation, the Fundraising Board of that university
- 2009 - Vice President, Women in Banking & Finance 2006 - Director, Starlight Children’s Foundation Australia
- 2006 - Director, Children’s Cancer Institute of Australia, and also the Chair of the Audit & Risk Management Committee

A former member for the Australian Federal Treasury's Inclusive Workplace Committee

Kelly is also:

A member of the European Union's Global Tech Panel, a member and Chair of the Global Council of Exponent, a global coalition that amplifies gender equity initiatives and partners to spark new ones, a member of The International Advisory Board for The Resolution Project, a member of the Global Leadership Council for MS Research Australia, an advisory council member for the Center for Universal Education at the Brookings Institution, and works with experts in access to global education including the former PM of Australia Hon. Julia Gillard.

== Recognition ==
Kelly is an advisor to the G20, as a member of the B20 Digitalization Taskforce and the Health Taskforce. Previously she was a member of the Infrastructure and Financing Taskforce. In 2014, Kelly spoke at the G20 Finance Ministers and Reserve Bank Governors Meeting, the B20 Summit on Financing Growth and the G(irls)20.

In 2017 she was named one of Australia's Best Chairs.

In 2015, Kelly was named a Director to Watch, by Directors & Boards, a quarterly US journal dedicated to the topics of leadership and corporate governance.

The Australian has quoted her thoughts on business leadership: "we are now living in a world where managements and boards have to be more nimble and collaborative and curious, because we are in an environment where companies have to embrace uncertainty". At Daze of Disruption in 2015, she spoke about the importance of investing outside of core business operations in order that organisations remain vital in the future.

In 2010 the Australian Financial Review article 'Women to Watch: Cultural Change' in 2010 featured her, as did the Australian Financial Review 100 Women of Influence Awards in 2012, where she was acknowledged as one of the top 10 women in management and on boards. In 2014 she was acknowledged as the Instyle magazine's and Audi's business-woman of style and has subsequently been on the judging panel.

Kelly was made a Member of the Order of Australia (AM) in the 2019 Queen's Birthday Honours in recognition of her "significant service to business through executive roles, and as an advocate for gender equity".

== Community and philanthropy ==
In 2012, Cassandra founded The Glass Elevator, a program designed to help connect, engage and inspire women in industry and government.

Cassandra has participated in the Vinnies CEO Sleepout, an annual Australian initiative raising awareness and raising funds to break the cycle of homelessness, and has been a member of the Vinnies' Advisory Board for the event. Thread Publishing has shared her thoughts on philanthropy and how Pottinger was created with the intention of being a social and commercial enterprise.

== Publications ==
The book Leadership Revelations III: How we Achieve the Gender Tipping Point by Avril Henry, published in 2015 featured her thoughts on gender equality.

Aside from her public speaking engagements on matters of disruption and strategy, Cassandra has presented at a number of forums focused on human rights and the issue of diversity.

Examples include:

- 2017 at the Global Summit of Women in Tokyo on a panel about how to accelerate women's access to board seats.
- 2016 at the Global Summit of Women in Warsaw, Poland
- 2015 at UN Women in Sydney
- 2014 at All About Women held at the Sydney Opera House on the role that women need to play in each other's success, through mentoring, encouraging strength and courage, and by creating a workplace culture that is truly innovative, inclusive and caring. Leaders in heels features her speech, quoting "We need to start a tidal wave movement. One that supports and encourages other women and one that demands opportunities for women".
- 2014 at W21 on advancing women's leadership at the G20 summit.
- 2014 at the Global Summit of Women in Paris on the urgency for practical steps to close the gender gap.
- 2013 at the Global Summit of Women in Malaysia, debating the topic of quotas versus voluntary initiatives to achieve gender parity in corporate leadership, particularly the boardroom.

Cassandra has spoken in Australia, New Zealand, the UAE, Malaysia, Europe, the USA and Japan (by invitation from Shinzō Abe) on gender equality.
