= Ministry of Health and the Fight against AIDS (Ivory Coast) =

The Ministry of Health and the Fight against AIDS French: Ministère de la Santé et de la Lutte contre le sida) is the health ministry of the Côte d'Ivoire. As of November 2014, the Minister for Health was Dr. Raymonde Goudou Coffie.

== See also ==
- Health in Ivory Coast
