= Cassie Kozyrkov =

South African data scientist

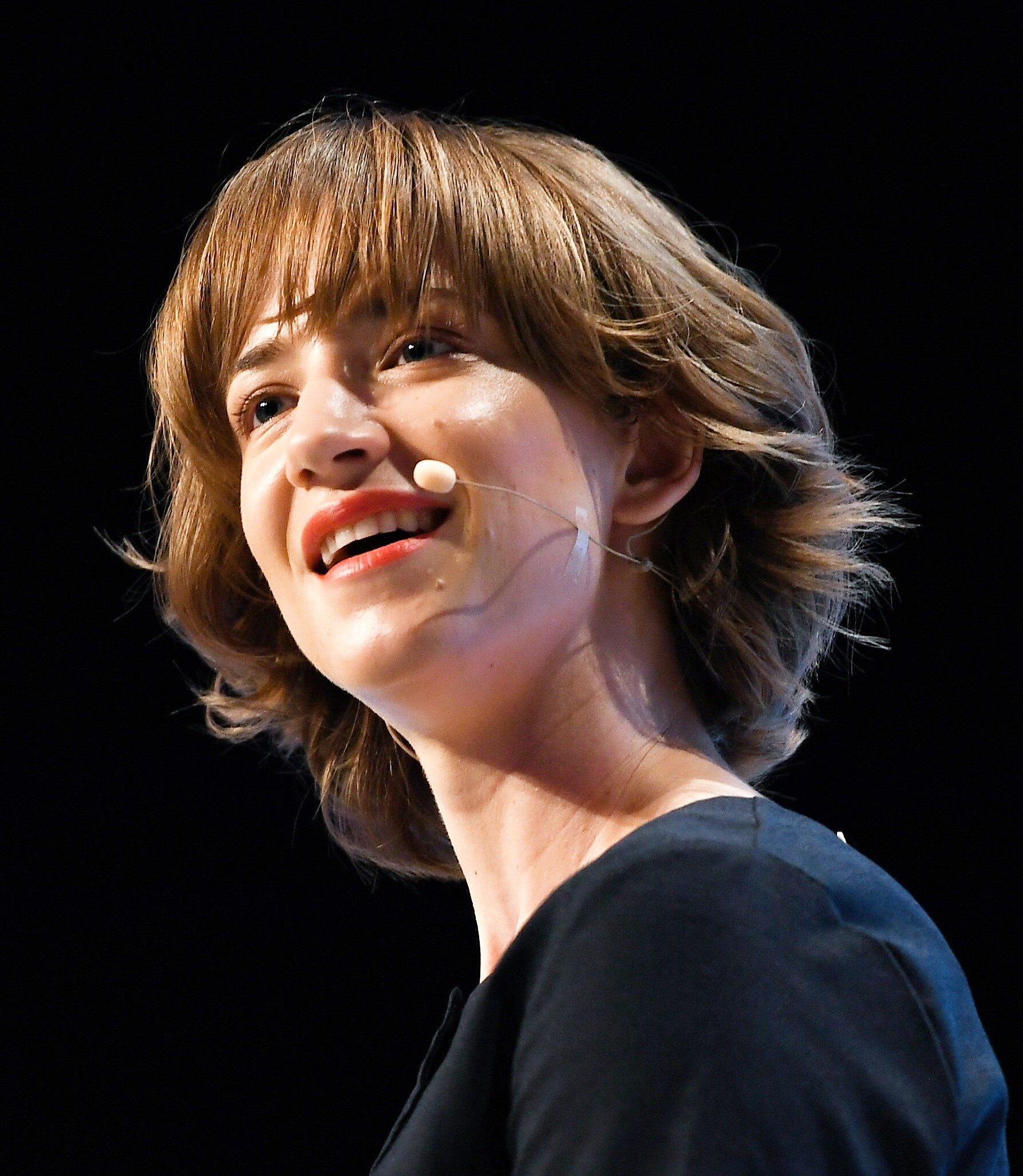
- Kozyrkov speaks at the opening day of Web Summit 2019
- Born: Saint Petersburg, Russia
- Education: Nelson Mandela University; University of Chicago; Duke University; North Carolina State University
- Known for: Decision Intelligence
- Scientific career
- Fields: Data science, AI, statistics, decision science
- Workplaces: Google
- Website: www.kozyr.com

Cassie Kozyrkov is a South African data scientist and statistician. She served as Chief Decision Scientist at Google and founded Decision Intelligence.

== Early life and education ==
Kozyrkov grew up in South Africa and moved to the US in her teens. As a child, Kozyrkov became interested in data when she discovered spreadsheet software and later became interested in the relationship between information and decision-making. She began her studies in economics and mathematical statistics at Nelson Mandela University at the age of fifteen, and transferred to the University of Chicago to complete her undergraduate degree. After graduation, Kozyrkov worked as a research assistant at the University of Chicago Center for Cognitive and Social Neuroscience, then enrolled in graduate studies at Duke University in psychology and cognitive neuroscience with a focus on neuroeconomics. Her research involved the neural processing of value and economic preferences.

== Career ==
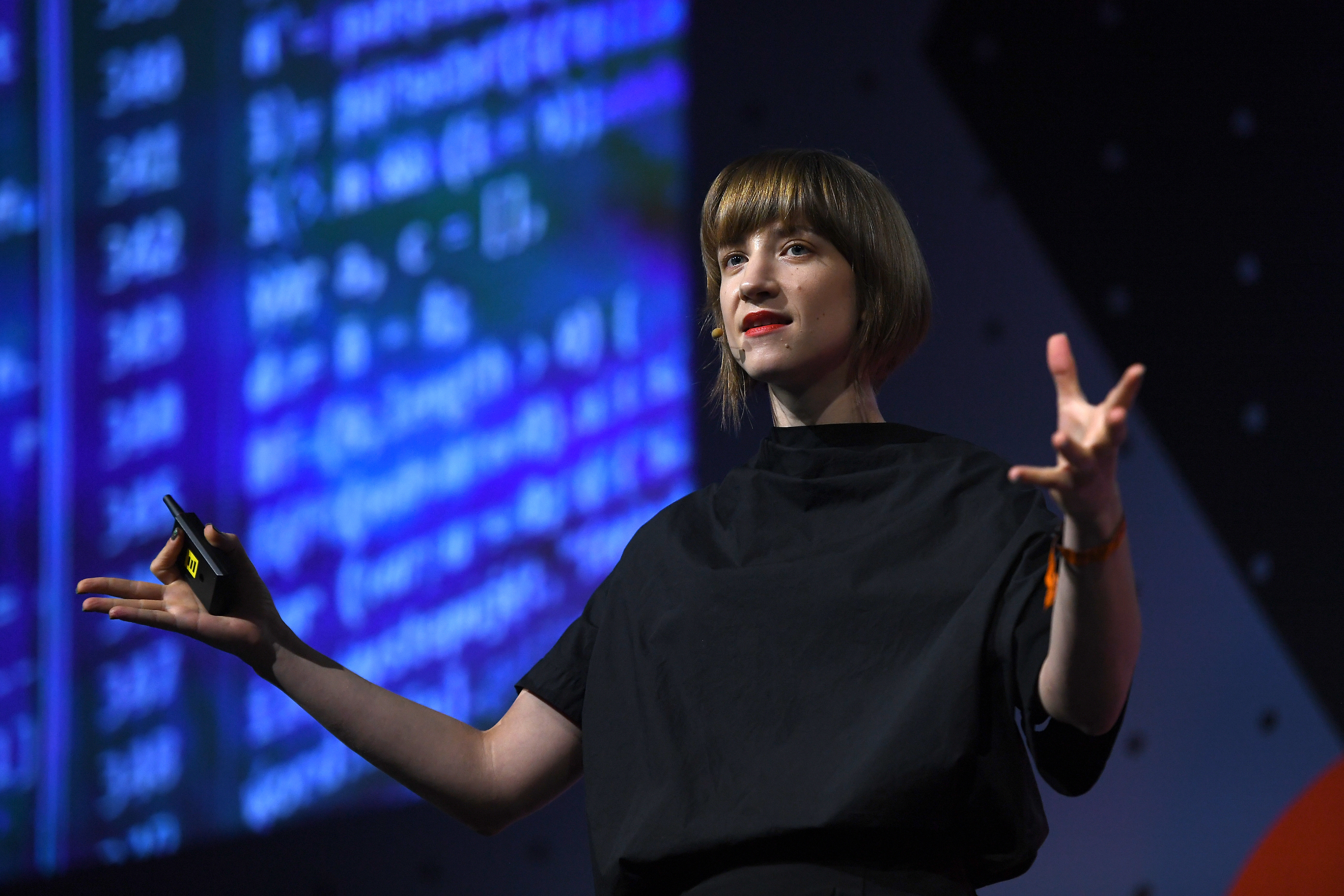
Cassie Kozyrkov during day two of Web Summit 2018

Kozyrkov joined Google as a statistician in the Research and Machine Intelligence division in 2014. She originally worked for Google in Mountain View, before moving to New York City a few months later. After two years, she joined the Office of the CTO at Google in 2016. Her area of focus at Google is on applied AI and data science process architecture.

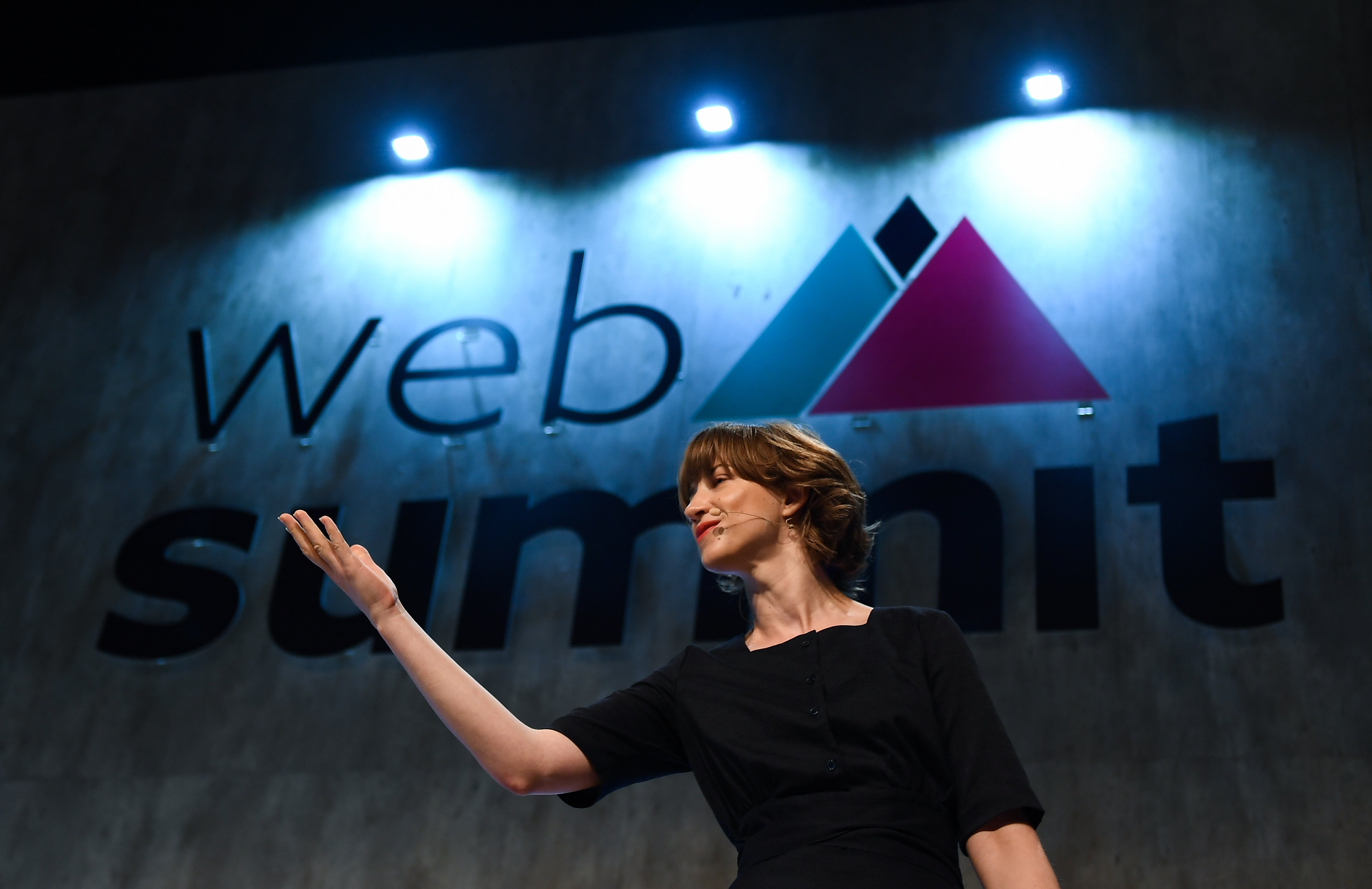
Cassie Kozyrkov during the opening day of Web Summit 2019

Kozyrkov is also a technology evangelist and has been called a data science thought leader. She has been a keynote speaker at large conferences , including Web Summit, the world's largest technology event. Her writing has been featured on Harvard Business Review and Forbes.
