= Cassandra Salguero =

Mexican footballer (2003–2024)

Personal information
- Full name: Cassandra Abigail Salguero Menchaca
- Date of birth: September 5, 2003
- Place of birth: Mexico City, Mexico
- Date of death: December 26, 2024 (aged 21)
- Height: 5 ft 8 in (1.73 m)
- Positions: Winger; forward

Youth career
- 2017–2024: Club Marina
2017	→		(0)

International career
Years	Team	Apps	(Gls)
2023	Mexico national beach soccer team		(0)

Cassandra Salguero (September 5, 2003 – December 26, 2024) was a Mexican beach soccer player. She played in the winger and forward positions and represented the Mexico national beach soccer team.

== Career ==
Salguero played with the Club Marina CR Femenil academy from 2017, of the Mexican Third Division League (Liga TDP Femenil).

In 2023, Cassandra was called up for the first time by the Mexican Beach Soccer Team.

== Personal life ==
Salguero was born on September 5, 2003, in Mexico along with a twin sister named Adriana Zarahí, who also practices the same sport. They played the Beach Soccer Cup in Acapulco at the beginning of the same month in which Cassandra died, in which they competed against Costa Rica. She died on December 26, 2024, at the age of 21.

== Honours ==
Mexico U21

- Acapulco Beach Soccer Cup 2024

== See also ==
- Alan Cavalcanti
- Belchior (footballer)
