= Pottinger (Australia) =

- Company type: Private
- Industry: Corporate advisory
- Founded: 2003
- Headquarters: Sydney, Australia
- Key people: John Sheehy; CEO; Nigel Lake; Chair and co-founder Cassandra Kelly; Co-founder
- Website: Pottinger

Pottinger is a global corporate advisory firm, which provides:

- Assistance with the development of strategy and public policy
- Advice on mergers and acquisitions and similar transactions
- Advice on infrastructure
- Advice on capital optimisation, financial structuring and capital raising

Pottinger has expertise across a wide range of industries, including infrastructure and utilities, energy and resources, property, technology, media and telecomms, and financial services. Pottinger Analytics is a specialist arm of the business that uses big data analytics to inform advice to clients, without the need to create and mine large data sets. The company has recently expanded operations into the United States, trading as Pottinger Global Advisors.

The firm competes primarily against the corporate advisory teams of global investment banks such as Goldman Sachs, JP Morgan and UBS, other M&A specialists such as Greenhill, Lazard and Gresham and the global consulting firms such as McKinsey and Boston Consulting Group.

The company was founded by Nigel Lake and Cassandra Kelly in 2003 and has offices in Sydney and New York.

== Notable transactions and appointments ==
- In 2012, Pottinger was appointed to the newly formed NSW Treasury panel of financial advisors
- In 2011, Pottinger advised ING Group on the sale of its Australian Investment Management business to UBS, and also on the $300m merger of The Rock Building Society with MyState Financial. Despite its relatively small size, the latter was the largest bank M&A deal globally in the second half of 2011, reflecting the significant challenges of completing acquisitions in the banking sector
- In 2010, Pottinger was appointed by The Australian Federal Government's Treasury Department to its newly formed panel of financial advisors
- Pottinger advised on the merger of $4.4 billion of water assets that formed Queensland Urban Utilities in 2010. This was the largest completed M&A transaction in Australia in the 2009/10 financial year, as well as Australia's largest ever water transaction
- Pottinger advised on the sale of LJ Hooker, the largest LBO announced and completed in Australia in 2009
- In 2008, Pottinger advised Suncorp-Metway on the establishment of a long term credit card partnership with Citigroup, including the sale of Suncorp's A$230 million credit card portfolio to Citigroup, one of the largest ever credit card transactions in Australia
- In 2007, Pottinger advised Suncorp-Metway on its merger with Promina, a transaction valued at A$7.8 billion, the largest ever completed general insurance transaction in Australia

== Awards and recognition ==
The Australian Government acknowledged Pottinger as the national role model for effective skills development in financial services in 2012. Pottinger has received eight Australian Business Awards for recommended employer.

Pottinger has been publicly recommended in the 2014 and 2015 official publications by the Ministry of Commerce of the People's Republic of China.

== The Glass Elevator initiative ==
In early 2012, Pottinger launched the Glass Elevator initiative, to support the development of greater diversity in the workforce. The initiative is designed to provide mentoring for mid to senior ranking female executives in major corporations, as well as engagement with some of Australia's most successful business leaders.

The Glass Elevator names reflects the need for active organisational support from large organisations to ensure that problems associated with or evidenced by glass ceilings can be better addressed over time.
