= Cassi Hill =

Residential area in the U.S. Virgin Islands

- Residential area
- The Shrine of Our Lady of Cassi Hill
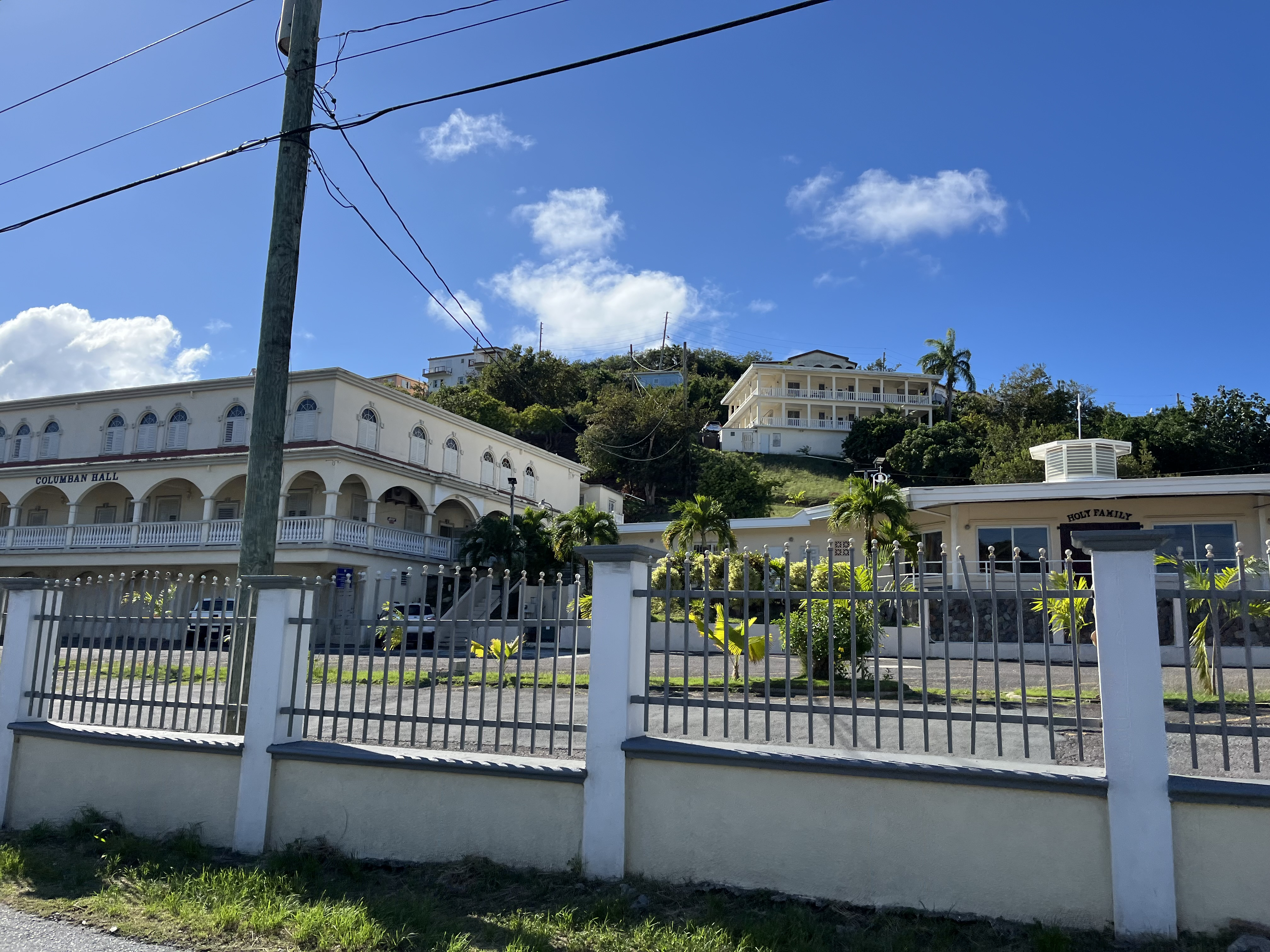
- Interactive map of Cassi Hill
- Coordinates: 18.347189°N 64.882920°W
- Country: United States
- Territory: United States Virgin Islands
- Island: Saint Thomas
- Elevation: 564 ft (172 m)

The Shrine of Our Lady of Cassi Hill is a residential area in the United States Virgin Islands. It is located on the island of Saint Thomas.

== History ==
It originated in 1947 on land owned by Leon Mason. In 1979, it was deeded to the Holy Family Parish.
