= Kassidi =

Kassidi may refer to:

- Kelli Kassidi, alias of voice actor Megan Hollingshead
- An alternative spelling for Cassidy
