= Kassis =

Kassis is a surname. Notable people with the surname include:

- Kyriakos D. Kassis (1946–2025), Greek poet and painter
- Nabeel Kassis (born 1945), Palestinian academic and politician
- Nick Kassis (born 1988), Lebanese rugby league footballer
- Randa Kassis (born 1970), Franco-Syrian politician
- Reem Kassis (born 1987), Palestinian writer and author
