= Orchid Project =

The Orchid Project is a British charity which works towards ending female genital cutting (also known as female genital mutilation or FGC). The Orchid Project is based in London and primarily works to advocate for increased resources towards ending FGC and raising awareness about how the practice can end. They also have programmes with Tostan in West Africa, Feed the Minds in Kenya, and with Senegalese musician and activist Sister Fa.

== History ==
Julia Lalla-Maharajh founded the Orchid Project after first encountering the issue of FGC in Ethiopia. Julia was volunteering with Voluntary Service Overseas and learned that 75% of women in Ethiopia had been cut. Lalla-Maharajh talked with local activists, all of whom said to her, "Please go, tell the world that this happens. This violates human rights and we need people to know about it."

Lalla-Maharajh returned to the UK and began campaigning against FGC. In 2010, she entered a video competition called the Davos Debates with a video about FGC. This led her to later meet Tostan's founder, Molly Melching. Lalla-Maharajh spent time working with Tostan in Senegal and Gambia before returning to the UK and setting up Orchid Project as a charity dedicated to ending FGC.

Orchid Project advocates for policy change and funding commitments from local and national governments and international humanitarian organisations. Orchid Project commissions research on how to achieve abandonment of the practice of FGC.

== Goals ==
1. Advocate to ensure stakeholders resource and prioritise an end to FGC.
2. Communicate the potential for an end to FGC; raising awareness about how, why and where female genital cutting happens.
3. Partner with organisations that deliver a sustainable, proven end to female genital cutting.

== Key areas of work ==
=== Advocacy ===
Orchid Project claims that they aim to secure attention and resources to be invested in ending female genital cutting by engaging with actors and decision-makers at every level–from grassroots, through to regional, national, and international actors. They argue that significant investment is needed if FGC is to end.

=== Communications ===
Orchid Project claims to raise awareness of FGC. The journalist Bidisha has said, "The work of The Orchid Project has been invaluable in showing, with great clarity, the reasons, history and arguments surrounding female genital cutting. For anyone learning about this issue, The Orchid Project is the first and best place to go".

=== Programmes ===
Orchid Project claims to partner with organisations that are working to end FGC through work that involves whole communities in ending the practice through a social norms led approach. Like UNICEF, Orchid Project believes that the best way to achieve this is through human rights-led education. They support this change through partnerships with organisations working at a grassroots level.

== Hope that FGC can end ==
Julia Lalla-Maharajh states that: "Our vision is a world free from genital cutting, and we believe that’s possible within a generation". Orchid Project often cite similarities between how footbinding ended and FGC, and how the right conditions can motivate mass change. "As with footbinding, public declarations of abandonment are vital to solidify any commitment to ending FGC. When a group of people stand up and publicly declare that they will no longer practice FGC, they are held accountable by everyone" – Gerry Mackie.

Orchid Project have stated that FGC can end through the idea of "organised diffusion", where change is led by communities, and the process of dialogue between communities leads to social change.
