= Kassandra =

Kassandra may refer to:

- Cassandra, a character in Greek mythology
- 114 Kassandra, an asteroid
- Kassandra (Assassin's Creed), a fictional character in Assassin's Creed: Odyssey
- Kassandra, Chalkidiki, a modern municipality and peninsula in Chalkidiki, Greece
- Kassandra (TV series), a Venezuelan telenovela about a gypsy maiden marrying into a rich family

== See also ==
- Cassandra (disambiguation)
- Kassandra (name)
