= Cassie (disambiguation) =

Cassie is a feminine given name, nickname and surname.

Cassie may also refer to:

- Cassie (album), Cassie Ventura's self-titled debut album
- "Cassie" (song), a song by Flyleaf about Cassie Bernall
- Cassie (singer) (born 1986), Cassie Ventura, an American singer
  - Cassie (album), a 2006 album by Cassie
- "Cassie" (Skins series 1), an episode of the British television series Skins
- Cassie, a fragrance extracted from Acacia dealbata
- Cassie, a fragrance extracted from Vachellia farnesiana

== See also ==
- Roman cassie, a name for the ornamental tree Acacia caven
- Cassie's law, a formula for the contact angle of a droplet on a composite surface
