= Casey (given name) =

Name list

- Pronunciation: /ˈkeɪsi/
- Gender: Unisex
- Language: English

Origin
- Language: Irish Gaelic
- Origin: Casey (surname)
- Meaning: "vigilant" or "watchful"
- Region of origin: Ireland

Other names
- Alternative spelling: Caicey, Kacey, Kasey, Cacey, Cayce, Kacie, Kayce, etc.
- Short form: Case
- Related names: Cassandra (in the case of females)

Casey is a given name, originally derived from the Irish Gaelic cathasaigh, meaning "vigilant" or "watchful". It can be used as a nickname for the name Cassandra or the initials K.C. It is in use for girls or boys in both the United States, the United Kingdom and other English-speaking countries.

It has ranked among the 1,000 most used names for American boys between 1900 and 1919 and again from 1942 to 2022. It was the 336th most popular name for boys born in the United States in 2022. It ranked among the 1,000 most popular names for girls in the United States between 1967 and 2019 and again in 2022. It ranked 946th for newborn American girls in 2022. The name was among the top 200 names for both sexes in the 1990s.

Kayce, a spelling variant, ranked 587th for American newborn boys on the U.S. popularity chart in 2022. The increase in usage of the name was inspired by the popularity of the television series Yellowstone that is set in modern-day Montana and of its spinoffs, 1883 and 1923, about ancestors of the family. The name might evoke the American frontier for some new parents. Place name Kaycee, Wyoming uses another spelling variation.

Some other spelling variants in use for both sexes include Cacee, Cacey, Caci, Cacie, Caicey, Cacy, Casi, Casie, Cayce, Caycee, Caysea, Caysee, Caysi, Caysie, Kacee, Kacey, Kaci, Kacie, Kaicee, Kacy, Kaice, Kaicey, Kaisey, Kasey, Kasi, Kasie, Kayci, Kaycie, Kaysea, Kaysee, Kaysey, Kaysi, Kaysie, KC, Keisi, Keize, and Kejsi.

== People ==
=== Men ===
==== Given name ====
- Casey Abrams (born 1991), American Idol contestant and musician
- Casey Affleck (born 1975), American actor, brother of actor/director Ben Affleck
- Casey Atwood (born 1980), American racecar driver
- Casey Bauman (born 2000), American football player
- Casey Beathard (born 1965), American country music songwriter
- Casey Blake (born 1973), American baseball player
- Casey Candaele (born 1961), American baseball player
- Casey Colby (born 1974), American ski jumper
- Casey Conley, American politician
- Casey Connor (born 1978), American lacrosse player
- Casey Cott (born 1992), American actor
- Casey Crawford (born 1987), American professional basketball player
- Casey Crawford (American football) (born 1977), American football player
- Casey Daigle (born 1981), American baseball player
- Casey Dailey (born 1975), American football player
- Casey Deidrick (born 1987), American actor and singer
- Casey Dunn (born 1976), American baseball coach and former catcher
- Casey Dunn (American football) (born 1994), American football player
- Casey Ellison (born 1975), American actor
- Casey Fossum (born 1978), American baseball player
- Casey Haines (born 1986), American ice hockey player
- Casey Hampton (born 1977), American NFL football nose tackle
- Casey Hudson, American game developer
- Casey Jacobsen (born 1981), American basketball player
- Casey Jones (disambiguation) (For the most famous person of this name, see the Nicknames subsection.)
- Case Keenum (born 1988), American football quarterback
- Casey Kennedy (born 1991), American professional golfer
- Casey Kotchman (born 1983), American baseball player
- Casey Kozlowski (born 1987), member of the Ohio House of Representatives
- Casey Laulala (born 1982), New Zealand rugby union player
- Casey Lawrence (born 1987), American baseball pitcher
- Casey Likes (born 2001), Americana actor
- Casey Martin (born 1972), American golfer and college golf coach
- Casey Matthews (born 1989), American football linebacker
- Casey McGehee (born 1982), American baseball infielder
- Casey McPherson (born 1978), American singer and songwriter for Flying Colors and Alpha Rev
- Casey Mears (born 1978), American racecar driver
- Casey Mitchell (basketball) (born 1988), basketball player for Elitzur Ashkelon of the Israeli Basketball Premier League
- Casey Nicholaw (born 1962), American theatre director
- Casey Neistat (born 1981), American filmmaker
- Casey Owens (c. 1981–2014), United States Marine and Paralympic athlete
- Casey Owens (basketball) (born 1971), American basketball coach in Kosovo
- Casey Patton (born 1974), Canadian boxer
- Casey Powell (born 1976), American lacrosse player
- Casey Prather (born 1991), American basketball player in the Israeli Basketball Premier League
- Casey Rabach (born 1977), American football player
- Casey Roberts (1901–1949), American set decorator
- Casey Rogers (born 1998), American football player
- Casey Royer (born 1958), American musician
- Casey Schmitt (born 1999), American baseball player for the San Francisco Giants
- Casey Shaw (born 1975), American basketball center
- Casey Simpson (born 2004). American actor
- Casey Spooner (born 1970), American artist
- Casey Stoner (born 1985), Australian motorcyclist
- Casey Thompson (born 1998), American football player
- Casey Tibbs (1929–1990), American rodeo performer and actor
- Casey Tiumalu (born 1961), American football player
- Casey Toohill (born 1996), American football player
- Casey Tucker (born 1995), American football player
- Casey Viator (1951–2013), American bodybuilder
- Casey Walker (American football) (born 1989), American football player
- Casey Walker (baseball) (1912–1998), American Negro league catcher in the 1930s
- Casey Walker (director) (born 1975), Canadian film and television director
- Casey Washington (born 2001), American football player
- Casey Weldon (born 1969), former American football player
- Casey Weldon (artist), American post-pop surrealism artist
- Casey Wescott, musician with the band Fleet Foxes

==== Nickname ====
- Casey Cagle (born 1966), American politician
- Clinton D. "Casey" Vincent (1914–1955), American brigadier general and flying ace
- Casey Donovan (singer) (born 1988), Australian singer
- Casey Jones (1864–1900), American railroad engineer
- Casey Kasem (1932–2014), American radio personality
- Casey Sander (born 1956), American actor
- Casey Stengel (1890–1975), American baseball player and manager
- Casey Bill Weldon (1901 or 1909–1972), American country blues musician

=== Women ===
==== Given name ====
- Casey Anthony (born 1986), American woman accused of killing her two-year-old daughter
- Casey Burgess (born 1988), Australian actress
- Casey Dellacqua (born 1985), Australian tennis player
- Casey DeSantis (born 1980), former American television host, wife of Florida governor Ron DeSantis
- Casey Desmond (born 1986), American singer-songwriter
- Casey Foyt (born 1983), American football executive
- Casey Gallagher (born 1996), English darts player
- Casey Krueger (born 1990), American soccer player
- Casey Loyd (born 1989), American soccer player
- Casey Riordan Millard (born 1973), American painter
- Casey O'Brien (born 2001), American ice hockey player
- Casey Phair (born 2007), American–South Korean footballer
- Casey Reinhardt (born 1986), American actress
- Casey Stoney (born 1982), English footballer and manager
- Casey Zilbert, New Zealand screenwriter and film director

==== Nickname ====
- Casey Williamson (1995–2002), American murder victim
- Casey Wilson (born 1980), American actress

== Stage name ==
- Casey Calvert, American pornographic film actress (born 1990)
- Casey Donovan (actor), American pornographic actor John Calvin Culver (1943–1987)
- Casey Jones, British singer Brian Cassar (1936–2022)
- Casey Jones, alternate identity for radio personality Al Anthony
- Casey Jones, television persona of Lunch With Casey show host Roger Awsumb

== Fictional characters ==
- Casey, in the 1888 poem Casey at the Bat
- Casey Becker, in the film Scream (1996 film) played by Drew Barrymore
- Casey Braxton, from the Australian soap opera Home and Away
- Casey Cartwright, on the television series Greek
- Casey "Cici" Cooper, a character in Scream 2
- Casey Hughes, on the soap opera As the World Turns
- Casey Jones, in the Teenage Mutant Ninja Turtles universe
- Casey Kelso, on the television series That '70s Show
- Casey McCall, on the television series Sports Night
- Casey McDonald, one of the main characters on the television series Life with Derek
- Casey Novak, on the television series Law & Order: SVU
- Casey Jean "C.J." Parker from the television series Baywatch played by Pamela Anderson
- Casey Rhodes, the Red Ranger in Power Rangers Jungle Fury
- Casey Ryback, in the Under Siege films played by Steven Seagal
- Casey Shraeger, a character in the television series The Unusuals
- Casey, an AI from the Gemini Home Entertainment series.

== See also ==
- Casey (surname)
- Kasey, a list of people with the given name
- Kaycee (disambiguation), including a list of people with the given name
