= CAS =

CAS, CaS, or cas may refer to:

== Arts and entertainment ==
=== Music ===
- Calling All Stations, the fifteenth and final studio album by Genesis
- CAS (album), a 2018 album by Lúnasa, an Irish Celtic band
- Cigarettes After Sex, an American dream pop band

=== Other arts and entertainment ===
- Čas, a Czech magazine associated with Tomáš Garrigue Masaryk founded in 1886
- Classic Arts Showcase, an American television channel promoting the fine arts
- Cowboy action shooting, a competitive shooting sport

== Computing ==
- CAS latency (column address strobe or column address select), a latency in reading computer memory
- Central Authentication Service, a single sign-on protocol
- Cloud Analytic Services, a server that provides the cloud-based, run-time environment for data management and analytics with SAS (software)
- Code Access Security in the Microsoft .NET framework
- Compare-and-swap, a special CPU instruction, an atomic instruction used in multithreading to achieve synchronization
- Computer algebra system, a software program that facilitates symbolic mathematics
- Conditional access system, a technology used in set-top boxes to allow conditional viewing of TV channels
- Content-addressable storage, a data storage mechanism
- Copyright Alert System, a former voluntary code
- Cycle-accurate simulator, a computer program that simulates a microarchitecture in a cycle-accurate manner

== Military ==
- Chief of the Air Staff, the professional head of the air force in some Commonwealth nations
- Close air support, a military tactic whereby aircraft are utilized to support friendly forces
- Combat armor suit, a specialized suit that provides powered armor
- Cost Accounting Standards, accounting requirements for larger defense and government contractors (United States)

== People ==
- Cas (name), a list of people and fictional characters with the given name, nickname, or surname
- Cas (people), an ancient people near the Caspian Sea

== Organisations ==
- California Academy of Sciences, a major natural history museum and center for scientific research
- Casablanca American School, a school in Casablanca, Morocco
- Casualty Actuarial Society, a professional society of actuaries in the United States
- Český atletický svaz, Czech Athletics Federation, the sports governing body in the Czech Republic
- Chemical Abstracts Service, a division of the American Chemical Society
- Children's Aid Society, a private charity in New York, US
- Children's Aid Society (Ontario), a Canadian government organization
- Chinese Academy of Sciences, the national academy for the natural sciences of China
- Christchurch Adventist School, a Seventh-day Adventist school in New Zealand
- Cinema Audio Society, an association of sound professionals in the motion picture and television industry
- Citizens Advice Scotland, the umbrella organisation for Citizens Advice Bureaux in Scotland
- Civil Aid Service, a Hong Kong Civil Aid agency
- College of Arts and Sciences, name for various educational institutions
- Combined Associated Schools, an association of private schools in Sydney, Australia
- Comite d'action socialiste, Socialist Action Committee, a French Resistance network
- Computer Arts Society, UK
- Connecticut Association of Schools, the governing body for secondary school sports competitions in Connecticut, US
- Contemporary Art Society, England, UK
- Contemporary Art Society (Australia)
  - Contemporary Art Centre of South Australia
- Contemporary Arts Society, Canada
- Council for the Advancement of Standards in Higher Education, a consortium of professional student development organizations in higher education
- Court of Arbitration for Sport, an international arbitration body set up to settle disputes related to sports
- Czech Academy of Sciences, a research association in the Czech Republic

== Science and medicine ==
- Calcium sulfide (CaS), a chemical compound
- Carotid artery stenting, endovascular surgery of the carotid artery
- Cas (mathematics), also known as the cosine and sine (cas) function (or Hartley kernel)
- Cas guava (Psidium friedrichsthalianum), a Costa Rican guava species
- CAS parameters, an image analysis method typically used in astronomy
- Cassiopeia (constellation) (Cas), standard astronomical abbreviation
- Cells Alive System, a line of commercial freezers sold by Japanese ABI Corporation
- Chemical Abstracts Service, a division of the American Chemical Society which produces bibliographic and chemistry databases
  - CAS Registry Number, unique numerical identifiers for chemical substances
- Childhood apraxia of speech, a developmental speech disorder
- Cis-abienol synthase, an enzyme
- Cognitive Assessment System, an academic assessment test given to children
- Complex adaptive system, special cases of complex systems
- Computer Aided Surgery (journal)
- Computer-assisted surgery, the use of computer technology in surgery
- CRISPR-associated (Cas) proteins, involved in the prokaryotic immune system and genome editing
- Critical animal studies, an interdisciplinary field in the humanities and social sciences
- Critical autism studies, an interdisciplinary research field led by autistic people

== Transport ==
=== Aerospace ===
- Calibrated airspeed, the airspeed shown by an airspeed indicator
- Casablanca–Anfa Airport (IATA code)
- Covenant Aviation Security, LLC, a company that provides security services to the aviation industry
- Crew-alerting system, the cockpit computer that issues system warnings to pilots

=== Rail ===
- Castleton railway station, Manchester, England (National Rail station code)
- Chicago, Attica and Southern Railroad, a former line in the American states of Indiana and Illinois

== Other uses ==
- Čas, the former official daily newspaper of the Democratic Party of Slovakia
- Caș, a type of cheese made in Romania
- Cas Cay, an island in St. Thomas, United States Virgin Islands
- Certificate of Advanced Study, a postgraduate certificate
- Channel-associated signaling, in telecommunications
- Clark Ashton Smith (1893–1961), American author and artist
- Collision avoidance system, an automobile safety system
- Controlled atmosphere stunning, a method for slaughtering animals
- County Antrim Shield, a football tournament in Northern Ireland
- Creativity, activity, service, the community service aspect of the International Baccalaureate Diploma Programme

== See also ==
- CASE (disambiguation)
