= Case (name) =

Case is an English language name, usually a surname but sometimes a given name. The given name may be a diminutive of Casey. The name may refer to:

== Surname ==
- Allen Case (1934–1986), American actor
- Almon Case (1819–1867), assassinated American politician
- Amber Case (born 1986), American cyborg anthropologist
- Andie Case (born 1992), American singer
- Andrew Case (born 1993), Canadian baseball player
- Anthony W. Case (born 1980), American astrophysicist
- Augustus Case (1812–1893), American admiral
- Box Case (1895–1969), British cricketer
- Cale Case (born 1958), American politician
- Clarence E. Case (1877–1961), American politician
- Clifford P. Case (1904–1982), American politician
- Ed Case (born 1952), American politician
- Ermine Cowles Case (1871–1953), American paleontologist
- Everett Case (1900–1966), American basketball coach
- Frank Case (1872–1946), American hotelier and writer
- George Case (baseball) (1915–1989), American baseball player
- Janet Elizabeth Case (1863–1937), British classical scholar and women's rights advocate
- Jean Case (born 1959), American philanthropist
- Jerome Case (1819–1891), American manufacturer
- John Case (disambiguation), multiple people
- Johnny Case (born 1989), American mixed martial artist
- Joseph Case (died 1610), Polish rabbi
- Jimmy Case (born 1954), English football player
- Karl E. Case (1946–2016), American economist
- Kody Case (born 1998), American football player
- Luella J. B. Case (1807–1857), American author, hymn writer
- Marietta Stanley Case (1845–1900), American author and temperance advocate
- Matt Case (born 1986), American ice hockey player
- Neko Case (born 1970), American musician
- Nicky Case (born 1994), Canadian game developer
- Norman S. Case (1888–1967), American politician
- Paul Foster Case (1884–1954), American occultist
- Peter Case (born 1954), American musician
- Reginald Case (1937–2009), American artist
- Scott Case (born 1962), American football player
- Sharon Case (born 1971), American actress
- Simon Case (born 1978), British civil servant, head of the Home Civil Service
- Squire S. Case (1801–1878), American politician
- Steve Case (born 1958), American businessman
- Stevie Case (born 1976), American game designer
- Stoney Case (born 1972), American football player
- Sue-Ellen Case (born 1942), American critic and academic
- Theodore Case (1888–1944), American scientist
- William Case (1818–1862), American politician
- William Case (cricketer) (1873–1922), English cricketer

== Given name ==
- Case (singer) (born 1975), American singer, full name Case Woodward
- Case Cookus (born 1995), American football player
- Case Broderick (1839–1920), American politician
- Case Keenum (born 1988), American football player
- Case Ootes (born 1941), Canadian politician

== Fiction ==
- Henry Dorsett Case, a fictional character in Neuromancer
- Lincoln Case, fictional character in the American television series Route 66
- Tiffany Case, fictional character in James Bond novel and film Diamonds Are Forever
- CASE, a fictional character in Christopher Nolan's film Interstellar

== See also ==
- Case (disambiguation)
- Casey (given name)
