= Casing =

Casing may refer to enclosing or surrounding material, such as:

- Case (disambiguation) § Containers
- Shell (disambiguation)
- Tube (disambiguation) § Science, technology, and mathematics
- Cover (disambiguation) § Packaging
- Sleeve (disambiguation)
- Cast (disambiguation) § Science and technology
- Casing (ammunition), shell enclosing the explosive propellant in a projectile cartridge
- Casing (borehole), metal tube used during the drilling of a well
- Casing (molding), decorative molding surrounding door or window openings
- Casing (sausage), thin covering holding the food contents of sausage
- Casing (submarine), platform attached to the upper side of a submersible vehicle
- Organ casing, the component that surrounds the pipes, action, and wind system

Casing or Casings may also refer to:

- Letter case, the distinction between upper and lowercase letters in typography
- Surreptitious reconnaissance, especially to aid a robbery
- "Casings" (Ethel Cain song)

== See also ==
- - Casing of the Colors, a US military ceremony
  - Casing the Promised Land, 1980 novel by Caleb Carr
- Cas (disambiguation), French for "case"
- Casting (disambiguation)
- KaSing (full name Raymond Ka-sing Tsang), British professional League of Legends player
