= Case =

Case or CASE may refer to:

== Instances ==
- Instantiation (disambiguation), a realization of a concept, theme, or design
- Special case, an instance that differs in a certain way from others of the type

== Containers ==
- Case (goods), a package of related merchandise
- Cartridge case or casing, a firearm cartridge component
- Bookcase, a piece of furniture used to store books
- Briefcase or attaché case, a narrow box to carry paperwork
- Computer case, the enclosure for a PC's main components
- Keep case, DVD or CD packaging
- Pencil case
- Phone case, protective or vanity accessory for mobile phones
  - Battery case
- Road case or flight case, for fragile equipment in transit
- Shipping container or packing case
- Suitcase, a large luggage box
- Type case, a compartmentalized wooden box for letterpress typesetting

== Places ==
- Case, Laclede County, Missouri
- Case, Warren County, Missouri
- Case River, a Kabika tributary in Ontario, Canada
- Case Township, Michigan
- Case del Conte, Italy

== People ==
- Case (name), people with the surname (or given name)
- Case (singer), American R&B singer-songwriter and producer (Case Woodard)

== Arts, entertainment, and media ==
- The Case, a 1972 TV movie starring Cliff Richards and Olivia Newton-John
- The Case (2007), a Chinese film
- Case (Case album), a 1996 album by American R&B singer and songwriter Case
- Case (Creepy Nuts album), 2021
- "Case" (song), a 2018 song by Nigerian singer Teni
- Réttur (transl. Case), an Icelandic drama series
- CASE, a fictional robot in Interstellar (film)

== Business, finance, and law ==
- CASE 30, an index of the Cairo & Alexandria Stock Exchange in Egypt
- Case Corporation, defunct manufacturer of agricultural equipment, tractors and cars
  - Case Construction Equipment (Case CE), a manufacturer of construction equipment
  - Case IH, a manufacturer of agricultural equipment
- W. A. Case & Son Manufacturing Co., a defunct American manufacturer of plumbing fixtures
- W. R. Case & Sons Cutlery Co., an American manufacturer of knives
- Business case, capturing the reasoning for initiating a project
- Legal case, a dispute between opposing parties, being resolved by a court proceeding

== Education ==
- Case (policy debate), in debate competition
- Case study, a research method involving an up-close, in-depth, and detailed examination of a particular case, in the social and life sciences
- Case Middle School, part of Punahou School in Oahu, Hawaii
- Case Western Reserve University, an independent research university in Cleveland, Ohio, US
- Center for Advanced Studies in Engineering, now Sir Syed CASE Institute of Technology, a private engineering institute in Islamabad, Pakistan
- Center for Architecture, Science and Ecology, a research facility of the Rensselaer Polytechnic Institute, US
- Centre for Christian Apologetics, Scholarship and Education, a ministry of New College, University of New South Wales
- Council for Advancement and Support of Education, a nonprofit association of educational institutions, US

== Language and linguistics ==
- Grammatical case, a common form of morphosyntactic inflection
- Letter case, a typographical distinction between capital and small letter forms
- Conceptually Accurate Signed English, a sign-language variety of Manually Coded English

== Science, technology, and mathematics ==
=== Computing ===
- CASE, a database used by the British Citizens Advice charity
- Best, worst and average case, in computer science, types of case analysis
- Computer-aided software engineering, for the software development life cycle
- Computer-assisted structure elucidation, for molecular geometry
- Support case (or ticket), in an issue tracking system
- Switch statement, a control statement, in programming
- Use case, a description of a system's behaviour in response to requests

=== Other science, technology and mathematics ===
- Calcium selenide (chemical formula: CaSe)
- Case-hardening, a process of hardening the surface of a metal object
- Case-shot, a type of anti-personnel canister ammunition similar to a shrapnel shell
- Case study, a research method involving in-depth examination of an individual
- Proof by cases (or exhaustion), in mathematics
- Contribution to ARIEL Spectroscopy of Exoplanets (CASE), an instrument onboard European space telescope ARIEL
- CaSE, Campaign for Science and Engineering, advocacy organisation in the United Kingdom
- Limiting case (mathematics), a special case with one or more extreme parameter values
- Limiting case (philosophy of science), a theory subsumed by another

== See also ==
- Box
- Carton
- Casa (disambiguation)
- Casement window, a window that is attached to its frame by one or more hinges
- Casing (disambiguation)
- Crate
- Justice Case (disambiguation)
