= Lokko =

Lokko is a surname of Ghanaian and Finnish origin. Notable people with this surname include:

== Ghanaian descent ==
- Beatrice Lokko (1949–2010), Ghanaian teacher
- Eva Lokko (died 2016), Ghanaian engineer and politician
- Kevin Lokko (born 1995), English football player
- Lesley Lokko (born 1964), Ghanaian-Scottish architect, academic, and novelist
- Mae-Ling Lokko (born 1987), Ghanaian-Filipino designer, academic and artist
- Mary Lokko, Ghanaian activist
- Vivian Kai Lokko, Ghanaian journalist

== Finnish/Estonian descent ==
- Külli Lokko (born 1957), Estonian cultural organizer, pedagogue and choir director
- Sven Lokko (1924–2008), Finnish writer and artist
