= Calvert Hall College High School =

Location
- 8102 La Salle Road; Towson, Maryland 21286; United States; 39°23′29″N 76°34′52″W

Information
- Type: Parochial
- Motto: "Vitae via virtus" (Latin) (("Virtue is the way of life"))
- Religious affiliations: Catholic (Lasallian)
- Patron saint: Saint John Baptiste de La Salle
- Established: 1845; 181 years ago
- Founder: Francis McMullen
- President: Br. John Kane, FSC
- Principal: Dr. Andrew Moore
- Faculty: 110
- Grades: 9–12
- Gender: Boys
- Enrollment: 1200
- Campus size: 33 acres (0.13 km^{2})
- Colors: Cardinal and Gold
- Athletics conference: MIAA
- Nickname: Cardinals
- Rival: Loyola Blakefield
- Accreditation: Middle States Association of Colleges and Schools
- Publication: The Odyssey (Literary Magazine)
- Newspaper: The Hall
- Yearbook: Cardinal & Gold
- Tuition: $21,300 (2026-27)
- Affiliation: The Brothers of the Christian Schools District of Eastern North America
- Website: www.calverthall.com
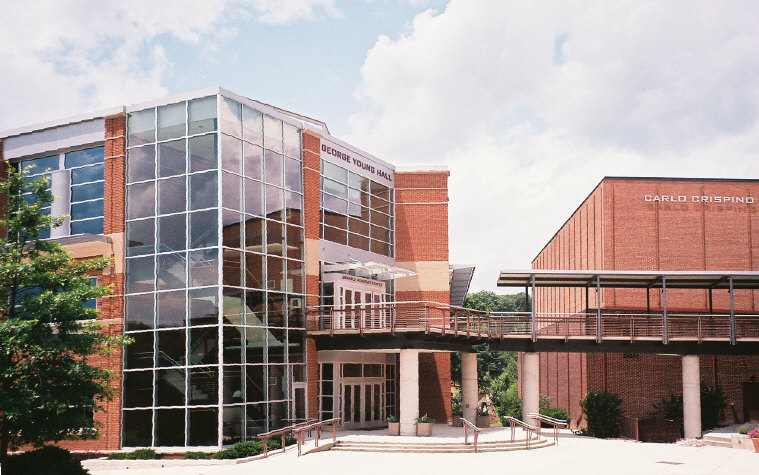
- George Young Hall

Calvert Hall College High School (also known as "Calvert Hall" or "CHC") is a Catholic college preparatory high school for boys, located in Towson, Maryland, United States. The school was established in 1845 by the Institute of the Brothers of the Christian Schools as a Catholic college preparatory high school for boys. It is the oldest Christian Brothers school in the United States.

Among its academic offerings is the McMullen Scholars Program, a four-year advanced-level curriculum requiring extra coursework in humanities, rhetoric and logic, and a senior independent project. Additionally, a program for assisting students with learning differences exists (the La Salle program).

== History ==
At the request of Archbishop Samuel Eccleston, who wished to provide a Catholic school for boys in the Archdiocese of Baltimore, the Brothers of the Christian Schools in Canada provided training for English-speaking candidates to become members of their order.

Once they had taken their vows, the new Brothers, led by Baltimore native Brother Francis McMullen, FSC, returned to the Archdiocese and attended the first Mass on September 15, 1845, with 100 students to commemorate the opening of what would become known as Calvert Hall College High School, the first school founded by the Institute of the Brothers of the Christian Schools in the United States.

Initially, the school was located in the parish hall of the former St. Peter's Pro-Cathedral but a rise in enrollment led to the purchase of property at Cathedral and Mulberry Streets, which was dedicated by Cardinal James Gibbons in 1891.

Calvert Hall moved again in September 1960, under the direction of Brother Gabriel Cannon, FSC, to its current Towson location. Throughout the next five decades, Calvert Hall continued to expand, adding additional buildings which provide space for academics, technology, and extracurricular activities, as well as renovating old spaces to maintain high quality facilities.

== Academics ==
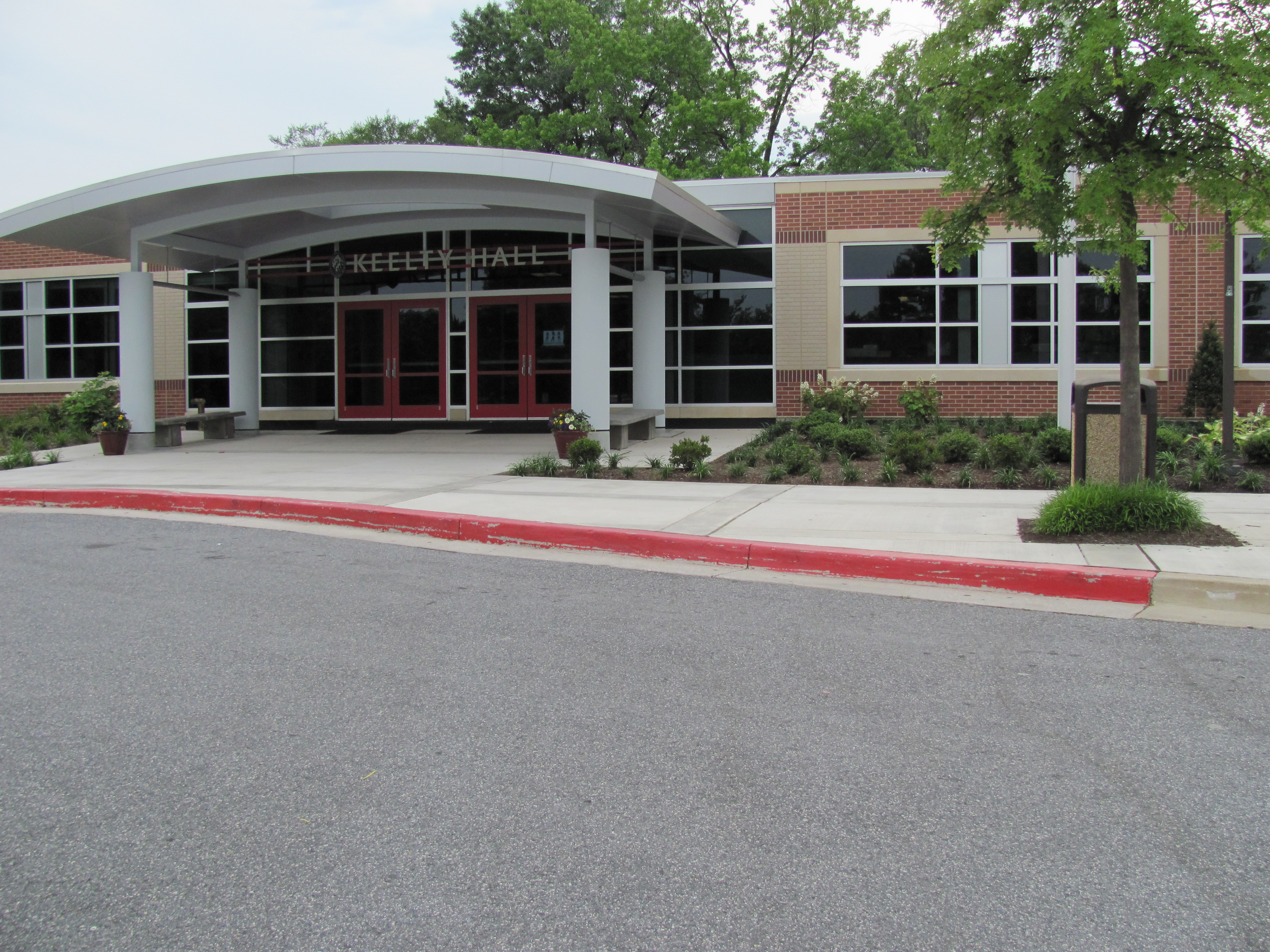
Keelty Hall is the main building

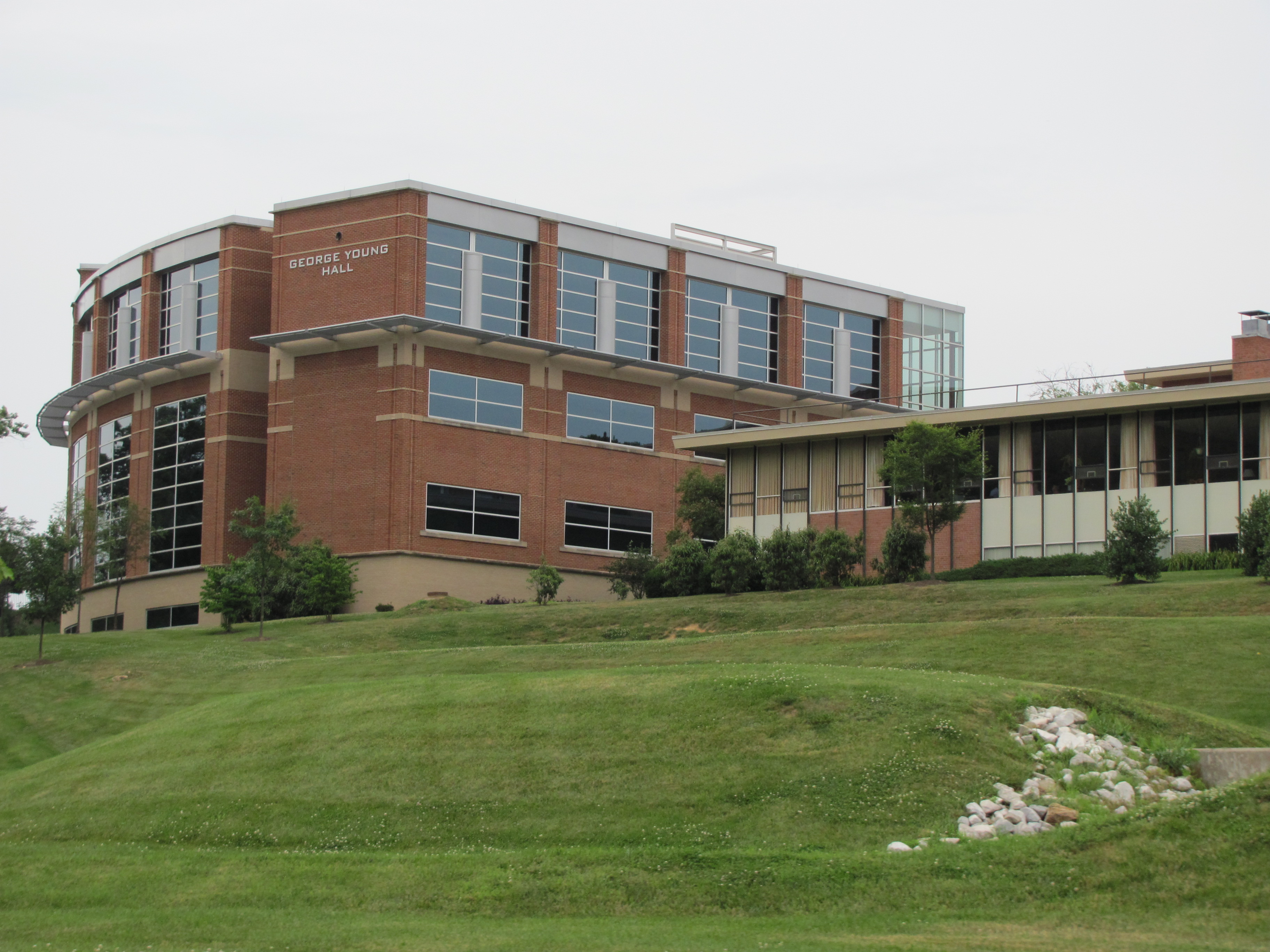
George Young Hall

Students at Calvert Hall experience a college preparatory curriculum, operating on a cascading six-day schedule. The schedule is fit with individual learning opportunities, during which students can choose to eat lunch, study, or meet with an available teacher. The free periods provide flexibility and allow students to develop effective time management skills. In addition, Calvert Hall uses a team teaching philosophy and a lecture-seminar format to mimic a university lecture system. Lectures are held in lecture halls that are equipped with multimedia presentation capabilities while seminars take place in classrooms centered on student learning.

Students are required to take four years of English, Social Studies, and Religion; three years of Mathematics and a Laboratory Science; and two years of Foreign Language and Physical Education/Health. Freshmen must take a year of Computer Applications while Sophomores are required to take a Fine Art. Electives, which include Introduction to Engineering, Forensic Science, and Personal Finance among others, are offered in all departments. A total of four elective units are a graduation requirement.

The school offers honors courses in most subjects and over twenty Advanced Placement classes. Students who score well on their entrance test and display an outstanding application are invited to interview for the McMullen Scholars Program, which " focuses on an appreciation of the Humanities as a basis for a Christian humanist education" and is headed by its own director.

Scholars are required to complete an independent project their senior year as well as participate in various activities within the program that demonstrate an appreciation for the Arts. Likewise, students with identified language learning disabilities can apply for the La Salle Program which has its own director and five learning specialists who meet with students everyday to address development of skills and "increase each student's understanding of his learning strengths".

Students who maintain a 90.0 unweighted or a 93.0 weighted and have been involved in service to the school for two years are invited to apply to the school's chapter of the National Honor Society. If they are admitted to the program, they are required to help at Orientation, Back to School Night, and Open House, as well as serve as tutors in the school's Academic Resource Center, which is staffed by a teacher during every class period.

Besides the Academic Resource Center, the school offers the George Young Library, complete with numerous on-line resources and 22,000 volumes, a Mathematics Resource Center staffed with a math teacher each period for one-on-one help, in addition to a Counseling Center where each student is assigned one of five guidance counselors and one of three college counselors. The campus also features the John G. Noppinger, Jr. '64 Commons, a large space in which students can work on assignments, as well as collaborate with students on group assignments, projects, etc. The Commons was constructed in June, 2015, and it opened for students in September, 2015.

== Athletics ==
Calvert Hall hosts 40 athletic teams among cross country, football, soccer, volleyball, water polo, basketball, hockey, track and field, squash, swimming, wrestling, baseball, golf, lacrosse, rugby, tennis, and the competitive marching band. CHC participates in the Maryland Interscholastic Athletic Association 'A' conference in all its sports, along with the Baltimore Catholic League for basketball.

=== Rivalries ===
Calvert Hall's unequivocal main rival in all sports is Loyola Blakefield High School. The two Catholic schools are separated by three miles and are both located in Towson. The Cardinals compete with the Dons in the MIAA conference in virtually all sports and compete in the Baltimore Catholic league in basketball as well. The largest event in the rivalry is the Turkey Bowl football game. The Turkey Bowl is a 104 year old rivalry game that is played every year on thanksgiving day at Johnny Unitas Stadium on the campus of Towson University.

Other conference rivalries include: Archbishop Spalding High School, most notably in Football and Baseball; Archbishop Curley High School, most notably in Soccer and Baseball; McDonogh School, most notably in Football, Soccer, and Lacrosse; and Mount Saint Joseph High School, in multiple sports.

=== Football ===
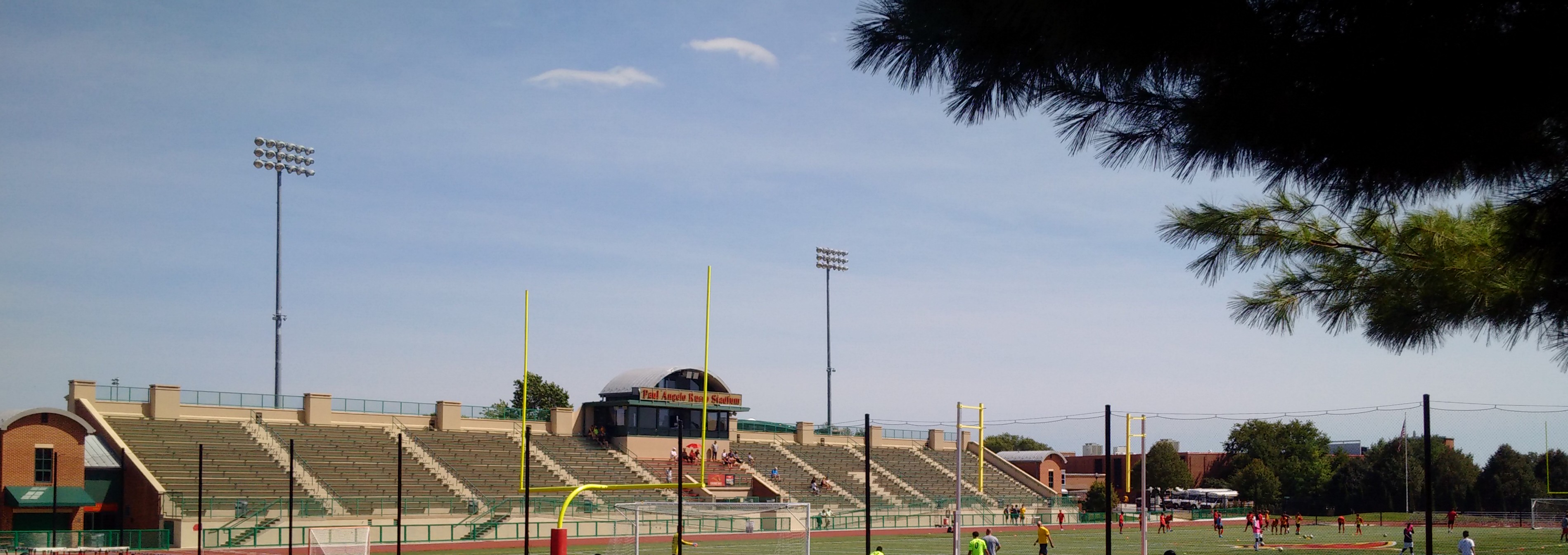
Calvert Hall's football stadium

The Calvert Hall varsity football team has won a combined twelve MSA & MIAA “A” conference championships, including their most recent in 2021. The team has also won five Baltimore Catholic League Championships in its history.

In one of the oldest Catholic school football rivalries in the country, dating back to 1920, Calvert Hall faces its arch-rival, Loyola Blakefield, on Thanksgiving Day morning in the annual Turkey Bowl game played at Johnny Unitas Stadium on the campus of Towson University. Prior to playing in Towson, the game was held at M&T Bank Stadium in Baltimore. Before M&T Bank Stadium was opened, the game was played at Memorial Stadium.

=== Soccer ===
The Calvert Hall Soccer team has won a combined thirty-four MSA and MIAA “A” conference championships, including back-to-back championships in 2021 and 2022. In 2022, the team finished as Co-National Champions following a 24-0-1 season. The 2022 team was ranked #2 in high school soccer rankings for the season.

=== Baseball ===
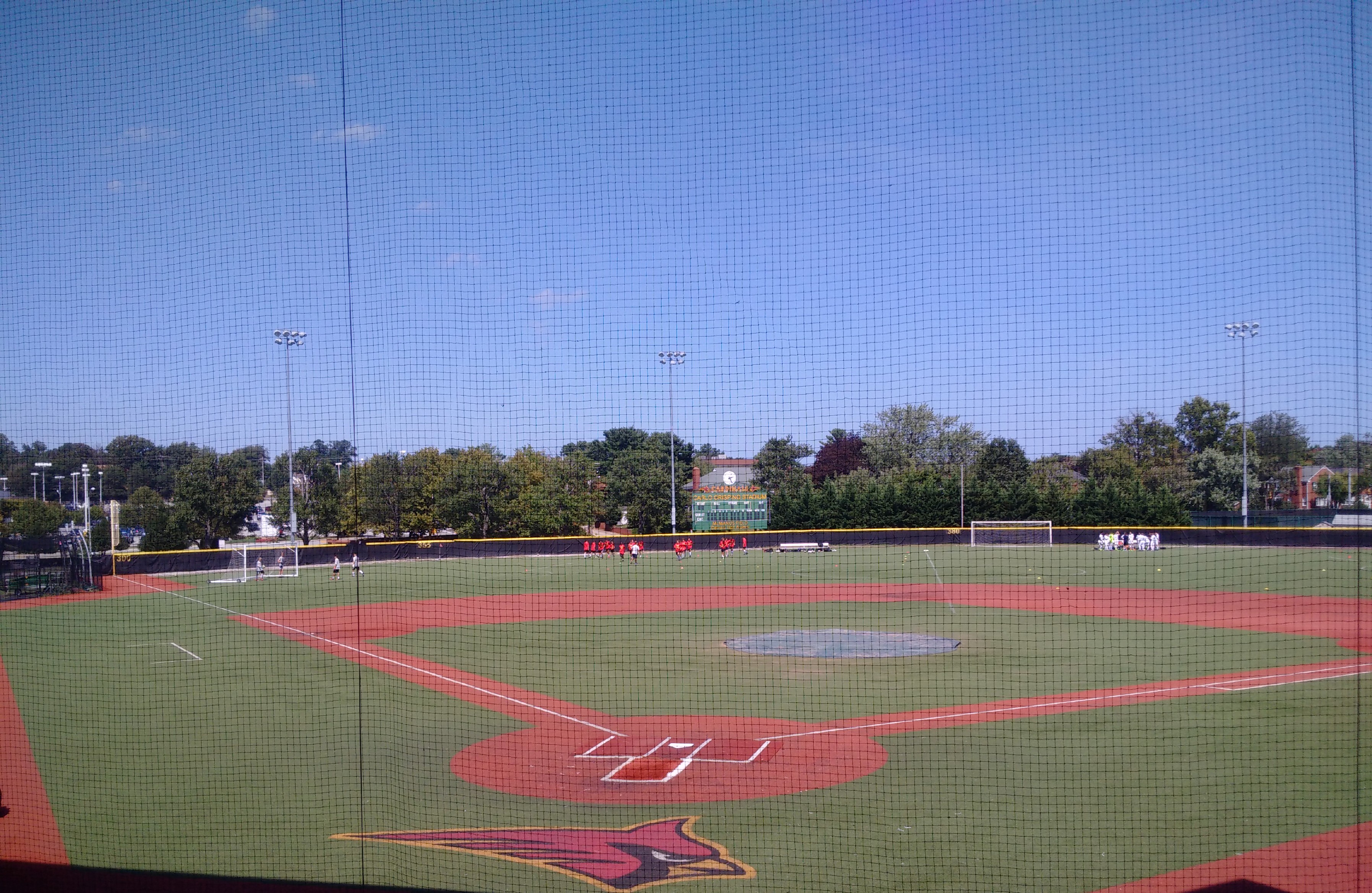
Carlo Crispino Baseball Stadium

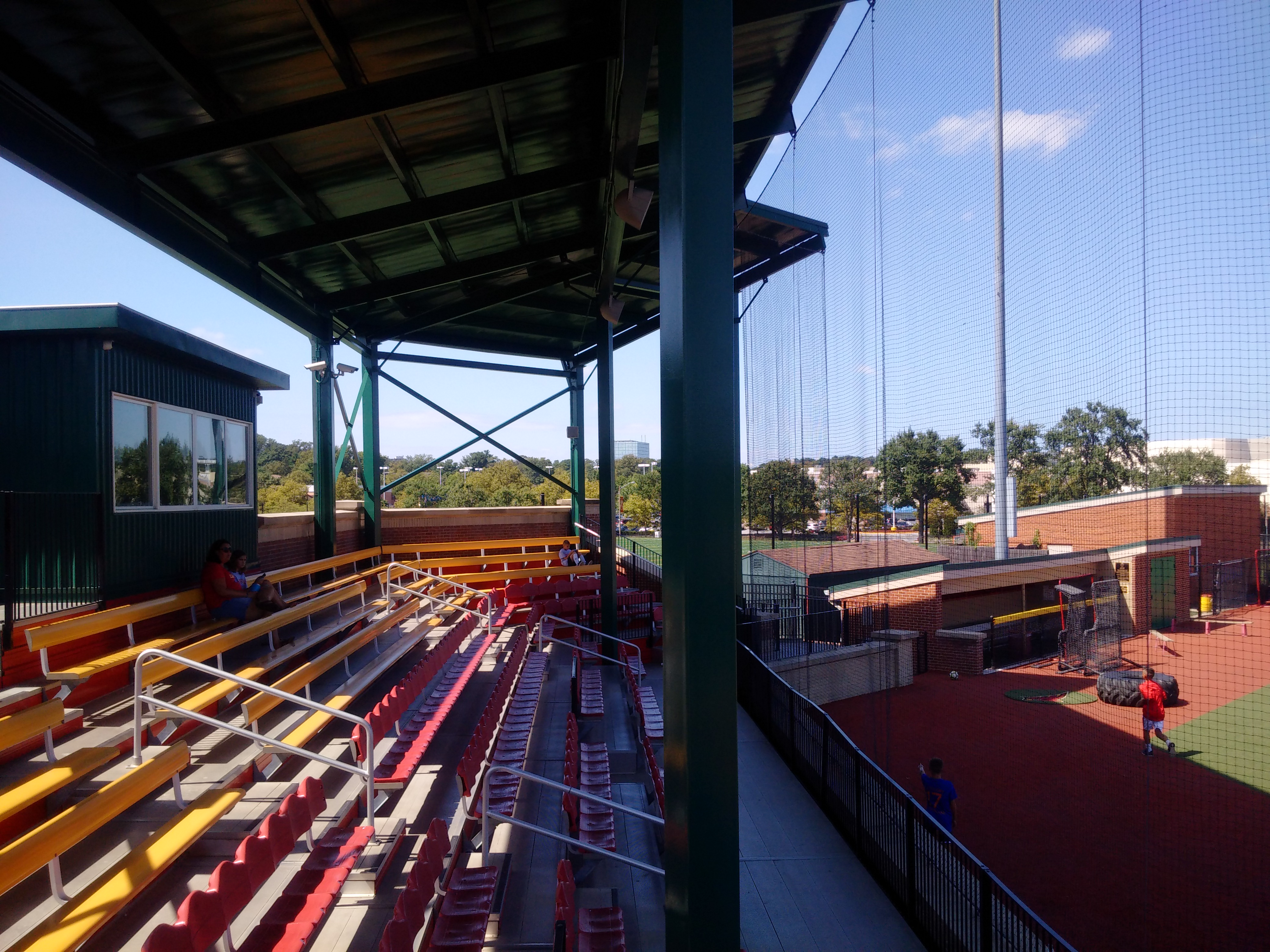
Baseball Stadium grandstand

The Calvert Hall baseball team has won twenty-eight MIAA “A” conference championships including a 4–2 victory over Gilman in 2013. On March 18, 2008, moved up to the #1 team ranking by USA Today in high school baseball.

On April 7, 2008, the school's Carlo Crispino Baseball Stadium was dedicated. Named after an alumnus who donated $1 million for the state-of-the-art facility, the stadium has a covered grandstand and FieldTurf, designed by Cal Ripken. Other former Baltimore Orioles attending the ceremonies were Bill Ripken and Billy Hunter.

=== Lacrosse ===
The Calvert Hall lacrosse team has won seven MIAA “A” conference championships, most recently winning back to back titles in 2025 and 2026. The team has also won five MSA championships. The 2019 team finished as National Champions following a 17–1 record that season.

The team was ranked #2 nationwide by Lax Power at the end of the 2011–12 after winning the MIAA championship against Loyola 17–3. They were ranked #3 before the 2012–2013 season and fell 12–10 to then #1 Boy's Latin in the semi-finals of the MIAA playoffs. The Calvert Hall hockey team won the MIAA championship between 2008 and 2010, in addition to winning the MAPHL Maryland State Championship in 2009.

=== Track and field ===
The Calvert Hall outdoor and indoor track and field teams have won a combined ten MIAA “A” conference championships, most recently in 2024. The 2022 team was ranked as the #1 team in the state during both indoor and outdoor seasons. They have also won the 'Triple Crown', meaning they have won Cross Country, Indoor track and Outdoor track in the same year. They have won this in 2023 and 2024.

=== Basketball ===
The Calvert Hall basketball team ended the 1981–82 season as National Champions. The team was ranked #1 after defeating Dunbar High School in a triple overtime thriller the previous season.

== Band ==
The Calvert Hall band performs numerous times during the year including local parades, home football games, and the Turkey Bowl. The Band is overseen by the Director of Bands, in addition to an Associate and assistant director.

The Calvert Hall Instrumental Music Department features 3 Jazz Bands, a Jazz Combo, 3 Concert Bands, and 2 Marching Bands. The CHC competitive marching band was named the 2004 & 2005 Tournament of Bands Group IV, Chapter V Champions, the 2016 and 2024 USBands Group II Open National Champions, as well as the 2017, 2018, and 2019 Group III Open National Champions.

On January 7, 2009, the band was named the Bowl Games of America's Band Championship Series National Champions.

== Presidents ==
- Br. G. Leonard FSC, 1924–1927
- Br. Felician John FSC, 1927–1930
- Br. Eliseus Vincent Hurley FSC, 1930–1933
- Br. Edewald James Conaghan FSC, 1940–1944
- Br. Daniel Henry Barry FSC, 1946–1950
- Br. Kevin Strong FSC, 1990–2000
- Br. Kevin Stanton FSC, 2000–2005
- Br. Benedict Oliver FSC, 2005–2009
- Br. Thomas Zoppo FSC, 2009–2013
- Frank Bramble, 2013–2014 (Interim)
- Br. John Kane, FSC, 2014–present

== Notable alumni ==
- Brendan Adams (born 2000), professional basketball player in the Israeli Basketball Premier League
- Adrian Amos, defensive back for NFL's Jacksonville Jaguars
- Mario Armstrong, talk show host
- John S. Arnick, member of the Maryland House of Delegates
- Michael Barr, software expert witness
- Ben Bender, midfielder for Charlotte FC
- Dave Boswell, Major League Baseball pitcher, 1964-71
- Lawrence Cager, NFL player
- James H. Collins Jr., bandleader, founder of the group Fertile Ground
- Casey Connor, professional lacrosse player
- Juan Dixon, NBA player, Most Outstanding Player for 2002 NCAA champion Maryland Terrapins; head coach at Coppin State
- Patrick Ellis, former president, Catholic University of America and La Salle University
- Duane Ferrell, former NBA player
- Justin Gorham (born 1998), basketball player in the Israeli Basketball Premier League
- Louis Hamman (1877–1946), American physician
- Patrick Healey, former Baltimore Blast player, Harrisburg Heat coach, former USMNT Futsal captain
- Chance Campbell, football player
- Kevin Huntley, professional lacrosse player
- Vince Kinney (born 1956), former NFL player
- Mel Kiper Jr., ESPN football analyst
- Damion Lee, basketball player
- Kurk Lee, basketball player
- Joseph Lutz, member of the Maryland House of Delegates
- Nino Mangione, former member of the Maryland House of Delegates
- James N. Mathias, Jr., Maryland legislator; former mayor of Ocean City, Maryland
- Jack McClinton (born 1985), professional basketball player
- Dennis C. McCoy, former member of the Maryland House of Delegates
- Wayne Mulligan (born 1947), former NFL player
- John L. V. Murphy (1878–1933), member of the Maryland House of Delegates
- Gary Neal, former NBA player for multiple teams, most notably the San Antonio Spurs, head coach of varsity basketball team (2021–2024)
- Samuel J. Palmisano, chairman, CEO, and president of IBM
- Thomas Roberts, news anchor
- Dwight Schultz, actor
- Tom Scott, football player, 2x Pro-Bowler and member of the College Football Hall of Fame
- Troy Stokes Jr., professional baseball player for MLB's Milwaukee Brewers, Pittsburgh Pirates and Independent League's York Revolution
- Heath Tarbert, nominee for Assistant Secretary of the Treasury for International Markets and Development in the U.S. (2017)
- Rick Trainor, academic, educator
- Sean Tucker, football player
- John Waters, actor, writer, filmmaker, artist
- Trevor Williams, football player
- George Young, former general manager of the NFL's New York Giants, member of the Pro Football Hall of Fame
- Brian Duker, American football coach, current defensive coordinator of the NFL’s New York Jets

== See also ==
- National Catholic Educational Association
