= Kacie =

Kacie is a feminine given name which is borne by:

- Kacie Boguskie, a contestant on The Bachelor (American season 16)
- Kacie Cryer (fl. 2004–present), American college basketball coach and former player
- Kacie Fischer, second woman to inline skate across the United States, in 2012
- Kacie Kinzer (born 1983), American designer and interactive artist
- Kacie Woody (1989–2002), American teenage murder victim

== See also ==
- Casey (disambiguation)
- Kacey, a list of people
- Kasey, a list of people
- Kasey, a list of people
- Kaycee (disambiguation)
