= Casey Walker =

Casey Walker may refer to:

- Casey Walker (American football)
- Casey Walker (baseball)
- Casey Walker (director)
