= Talk to Me (exhibition) =

2011 exhibition at Museum of Modern Art

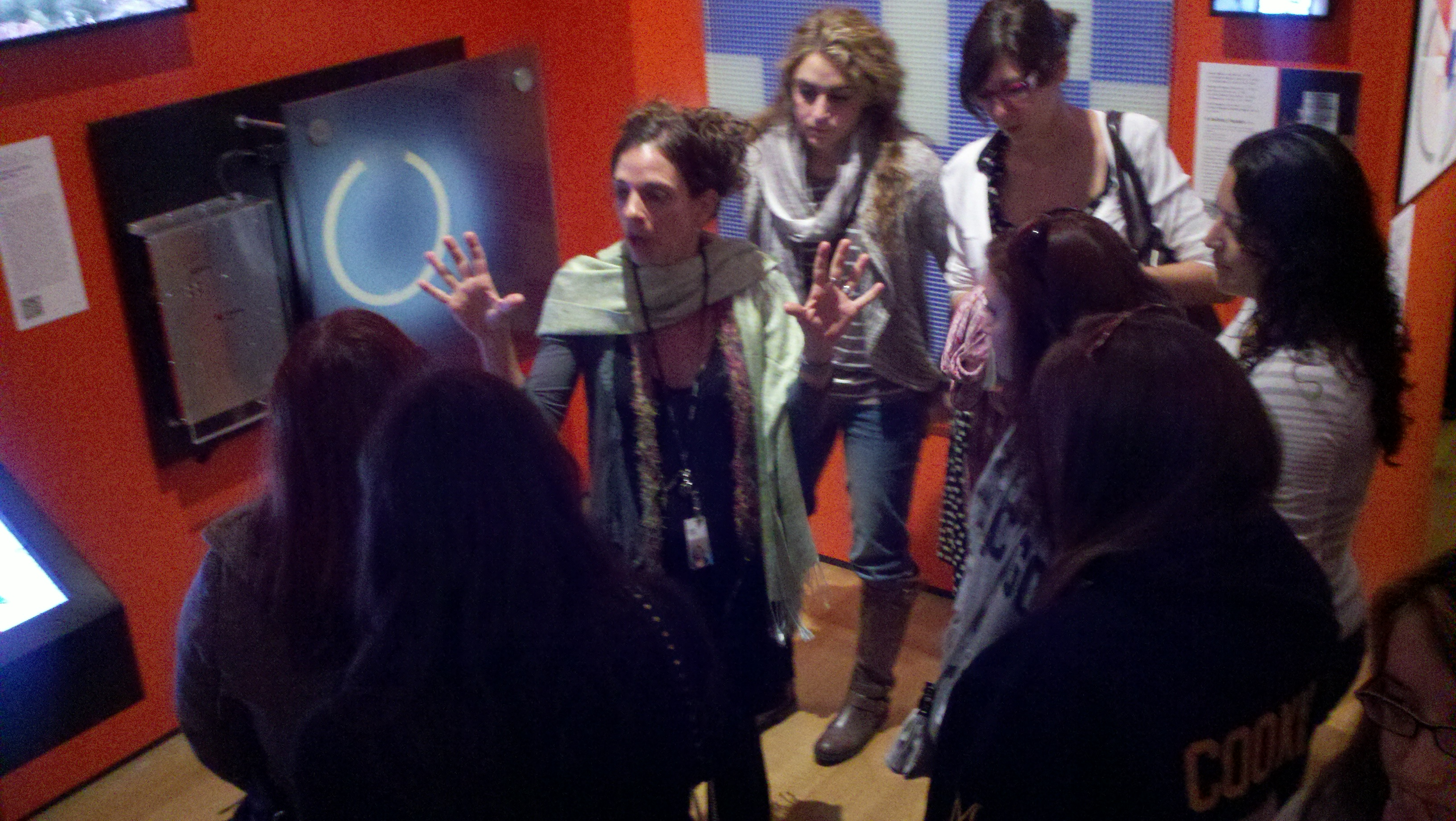
Talk To Me exhibition museum visitors

Talk to Me: Design and the Communication between People and Objects was an exhibition put on by the Museum of Modern Art from July 24 to November 7, 2011. Created by the Department of Architecture and Design, it was widely reviewed and drew many visitors. The exhibit was organized by Paola Antonelli, Senior Curator in the Department of Architecture and Kate Carmody, curatorial assistant. The exhibition explores and showcases the communications, dialogue and interface between people and machines.

Talk to Me featured 194 works by 236 artists, some provide information, others act as gateways or interfaces. Each object's label included a QR Code allowing the visitor to view information on the piece's artist, background information on the piece, read tweets posted by other visitors related to the object and included connections to other objects in the exhibition with similar themes, design or use.

== Exhibition categories ==
The exhibition was divided into five categories: Objects, Bodies, Life, City, and Worlds.

- Objects investigated objects, interfaces, and systems that are not just communicative and interactive but also have personalities. Some were conceptual—such as Kacie Kinzer’s Tweenbots, which demonstrate New Yorkers’ irrepressible impulse to help anything or anyone that seems to be lost, even if it was a cardboard robot carrying a little flag—and others functional and functioning, such as the interfaces for the ATM at Barclays or the MetroCard Vending Machine.
- Bodies focused on the communication between people by means of objects. The human body and mind are the central agents and subjects of study in this chapter, expressing and explaining themselves in ways previously unthinkable.
- Designers search for the meaning of Life in empirical and suggestive ways.
- The City, with its density and complex infrastructures and systems relies on communication for its own survival. This category showed the changed role of designers—from creators of form and function to enablers, inspirers, and facilitators—in particular detail.
- In Worlds most of these technologies share that they are based on systems and rely on networks, just like the natural world. Understanding their design was often a requirement for those building actual physical and virtual worlds, from designers and architects to engineers and television executives.

== Works ==
- Cross-fire from the Natural Occurrence series (2010) was an animation directed by Geoffrey Mann and produced by Chris Labrooy. A dinner table was set with plates, cups, and silverware that have motion running through them while an audio that sounds like a generic marital argument plays. It was shown to give the impression of the sounds running through the table set up.
- Eyewriter (2009) was a display that shows video and visual examples of the connection between art and technology. It was based on graffiti artist Tempt1 who was diagnosed with ALS in 2003. It prevented him from physically continuing his art work in which he began to use new technology that allowed him to use his eye movements in order to continue creating.
- Animal Superpowers: Ant and Giraffe (2008) was a technology that gives a person the ability to have animal senses such as the Ant and/or Giraffe. This display shows a young girl wearing a device that allowed her to see like an ant, magnifying her vision 50 times to give her the visual perspective of an ant. This installation also contains the device.
- Bat Billboard (2008) by Natalie Jeremijenko displays a picture of a billboard/ isease-free bat habitat in order to create a bridge between humans and bats. "The billboard inventively reclaims urban infrastructure for animal habitat and also functions as a public face for the bats, translating their habits and activities in a way that humans can understand."
- Notepad (2008) by Matt Kenyon and Douglas Easterly of S.W.A.M.P., looks like an ordinary yellow legal pad that was revealed (when magnified) to be micro-printed text enumerating the full names, dates and locations of each Iraqi civilian death on record over the first three years of the Iraq War. Hundred of these notepads were covertly distributed to US representatives and senators, as a sort of Trojan horse, injecting transgressive data into official archives.
