= Limiting case =

The phrase limiting case has several different meanings in:

- Limiting case (mathematics)
- Limiting case (philosophy of science)
