= John Case =

John Case may refer to:

- John Case (Aristotelian writer) (died 1600), English Aristotelian writer
- John Case (astrologer) (1660–1700), English astrologer and quack doctor
- John Case (hurdler) (1889–1975), American track and field athlete
- John Case (novelist), pseudonym for Jim Hougan (born 1942) and Carolyn Hougan (1943–2007)
- John Higley Case (1832–1890), American politician from Minnesota
- John S. Case (1823–1902), Republican politician from Maine
- John Carol Case (1923–2012), English baritone

== See also ==
- John Case Schaeffer II (born 1946), American musician
- John Casey (disambiguation)
