= Casey Jones (disambiguation) =

Casey Jones (1863–1900) was an American railroad engineer.

Casey Jones may also refer to:

== People ==
- Casey Jones (ice hockey) (born 1968), Canadian ice hockey coach
- Casey Jones (politician) (1915–2002), former member of the Ohio House of Representatives; also a professional basketball player in the NBL during the 1940s
- Casey Jones (catcher) (1918–1998), American Negro league baseball player
- Casey Jones (outfielder), American Negro league baseball player
- Casey Jones (musician) (1939–2017), solo blues artist and former drummer for guitarist Albert Collins
- Casey Veggies (born 1993), hip hop artist
- Casey Jones, former member of Blessed by a Broken Heart
- Casey Jones (1936–2022), stage name of British singer Brian Cassar
- Casey Jones, alternate identity for radio personality Al Anthony
- Casey Jones, television persona of Lunch With Casey show host Roger Awsumb
- Casey Jones, author of the American comic book All Fall Down

== Music ==
- "The Ballad of Casey Jones", a c. 1909 folk song about the railroad engineer
- "Casey Jones" (Grateful Dead song), a 1970 song by the Grateful Dead, also about the railroad engineer
- Casey Jones (band), a straight edge hardcore punk band from Florida

== Fiction ==
- Casey Jones (play), a 1938 play by Robert Ardrey
- Casey Jones (TV series), a 1957 television show starring Alan Hale Jr
- Casey Jones (Teenage Mutant Ninja Turtles), a character from the Teenage Mutant Ninja Turtles series
  - Casey Jones (film), a 2011 fan film based on the Teenage Mutant Ninja Turtles character

== See also ==
- K. C. Jones (1932–2020), American basketball player and coach
- K. C. Jones (American football) (born 1974), American football player
- Kacey Jones (1950–2016), American singer-songwriter
