= Cazzie =

Cazzie is a given name. Notable people with the given name include:

- Cazzie David (born 1994), American scriptwriter and actress
- Cazzie Russell (born 1944), American basketball player and coach

== See also ==
- Casey (given name), another given name
