= Almondo =

Almondo is both a given name and a surname. Notable people with the name include:

- Almondo Curry (born 1980), American football player
- Almondo Fiori (born 1929), American radio personality
- Almondo Sewell (born 1987), American football player
- Mario Almondo (born 1964), Italian engineer
