= Vincent Birch Freeman =

Ghanaian educationist

- Born: Vincent Birch Freeman; 25 December 1936 (age 89); Winneba
- Education: Accra Academy; St. Augustine's College; University of Ghana
- Occupation: teacher
- Known for: Headmaster of Accra Academy and Ebenezer
- Spouse: Felicia Freeman
- Children: 6

Vincent Birch Freeman (born 25 December 1936) is a Ghanaian educationist who was headmaster of Accra Academy from 1986 to 1996 and headmaster of Ebenezer Senior High School from 1974 to 1986. He served as president of the Conference of Heads of Assisted Secondary Schools from January 1996 to December 1996.

== Early life and education ==
Vincent Freeman was born on 25 December 1936 at Winneba in the Central Region of Ghana. His parents were Thomas Birch Freeman and Akosua Odey.

Freeman had his middle school education at Presbyterian Boys Day School in Osu from April 1951 to December 1952. Freeman was admitted into Accra Academy in 1953 and graduated in 1956. In 1957, he entered St. Augustine's College in Cape Coast for sixth form. At St. Augustine's, he became the shot put and discus champion and represented the school in competitions. In 1958, Freeman was elected a class captain and subsequently house prefect of St. Francis House.

After high school, Freeman taught for a year at Wesley Grammar School. He gained admission to the University of Ghana in 1960. He joined the university's athletic team and became its shot put champion after setting a record. Freeman served as president of Akuafo Hall Junior Common Room from 1961 to 1962. He graduated in 1963, obtaining a Bachelor of Arts in English. He graduated from Moray House College of Education in Edinburgh, Scotland in 1968 with a diploma in Teaching English as a Second Language after a year study on British Council scholarship.

== Career ==
=== Start in teaching (1963 - 1974) ===
Freeman served as English master at Ofori Panin Senior High School from 1963 to 1966. In September 1966, he was transferred to O'Reilly Senior High School as an English master, and transferred again to Salem Secondary School in 1968. In 1969, he returned to O'Reilly as senior English master before being appointed assistant headmaster at O'Reilly from 1970 to 1974.

In 1973, Freeman was the presenter of Ghana Broadcasting Corporation’s Ten Minutes of English televised programme.

=== Ebenezer (1974 - 1986) ===
In 1974, Freeman was appointed headmaster of Ebenezer Secondary School, then a boys school located in Mamprobi. Two years into Freeman's headship, Ebenezer became a coed with a Ministry of Education directive. In his tenure, land was acquired at Dansoman as a permanent site for the school, leading to the relocation of the school in 1984. From 1977 to 1978, he served as secretary of the Greater Accra Regional branch of CHASS, and from January 1982 to August 1984, he was chairman of the branch. He became national secretary of CHASS in 1984. In 1985, Freeman became a member of the Ghana National Committee of WAEC and served on this body for four years. In October 1986, he resigned from Ebenezer. He was headmaster of Ebenezer for twelve years.

=== Accra Academy (1986 - 1996) ===
In 1986, he took up the position of headmaster of Accra Academy from Jacob Okine. Freeman, as headmaster, introduced a computer awareness programme into Accra Academy. Freeman introduced and opened the South gate of the school's campus on the Accra-Winneba highway, and closed down the entry points on the East and West of the school. He also instituted a lectures series; the Accra Academy Foundation Lectures, and invited Paul Boateng, a Member of the House of Commons, as its first speaker. Freeman compiled a school hymnal from the Methodist English hymnal in 1993. In this, he published an account of the school's beginnings to get students have the school's history.

In 1987, Freeman was appointed a member of the Ghana Association of Private Voluntary Organisations in Development (GAPVOD). In 1991, he was the representative of GAPVOD to the Consultative Assembly whose work was to draft the 1992 Ghanaian constitution. Freeman was the parliamentary candidate of the National Convention Party for Ablekuma South in 1992 Ghanaian parliamentary election but was defeated by George Quaynor-Mettle.

In January 1996, Freeman was elected national president of CHASS after serving as national secretary of CHASS since 1984. He was also a member of the international council of the WAEC from 1985 to 1996 and served on several committees and boards of the organisation during this period. Freeman was a member of the national council of the Ghana National Association of Teachers from 1989 to 1993. He served on the council of the University of Cape Coast from 1993 to 1996. He held the positions of headmaster of Accra Academy and president of CHASS till his retirement in December 1996 when he turned sixty years.

=== Retirement activities (1996 - ) ===
Freeman became managing director of Read-wide bookshop from January 1997 to June 1999. In October 1999 he became managing director of a bookselling company and educational consultancy. He has also served as National President of the Ananda Marga Yoga Society. Freeman was also chairman of the Voluntary Work Camps Association of Ghana from 1996 to 2000.

Freeman has been a governor of a number of schools. He was vice chairperson of the board of East Airport School from 2002 to 2012, vice chairman of the Accra Academy board of governors from 2009 to 2013, chairman of the board of governors of Holy Trinity Cathedral Senior High School from 2013 to 2017 and chairman of the board of governors of Ebenezer Senior High School, from 2017 to present.

Academic offices
Preceded by J. K. Okine	Head Master of Accra Academy; 1986 - 1996	Succeeded by Beatrice Lokko
