= Ebenezer Senior High School =

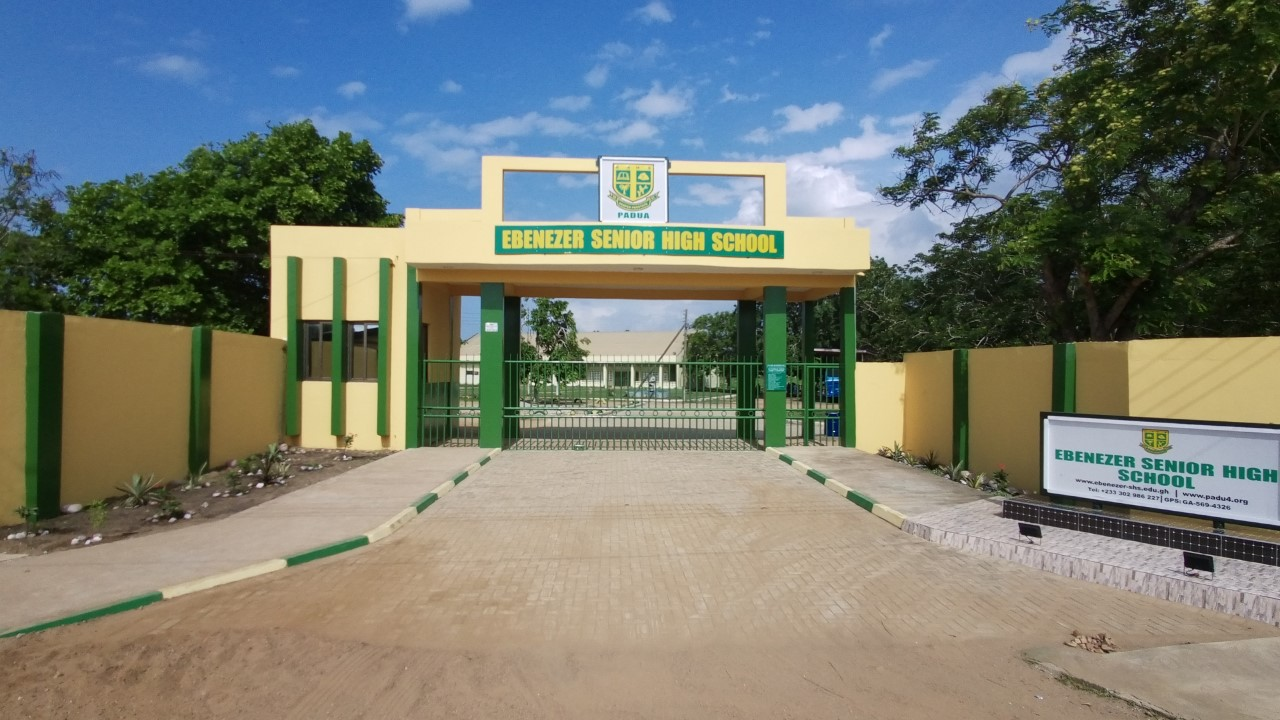
- Ebenezer Senior High School entrance gate

Location
- Botoi Shienyo St, Mpoase, Dansoman, Accra; Greater Accra; Ghana
- Coordinates: 5°31′51.2″N 0°16′22.5″W

Information
- Other name: Padua
- Former name: Ebenezer Secondary School
- Type: Public Senior Secondary School
- Motto: Semper Perstate (Always Persevere)
- Established: January 1941
- Founder: Robert Teiko Aryee
- Status: Active
- Educational authority: Ablekuma West Municipal District
- Oversight: Ghana Education Service
- Principal: Anastasia Afua Konadu
- Grades: Forms 1–3 (Grades 10–12)
- Gender: Boys and Girls
- Enrollment: 2578
- Language: English
- Campus size: 45 acres
- Campus type: Urban
- Houses: Aryee; Freeman; Martinson; Otoo
- Colours: Green and Yellow
- Slogan: Ebenesco
- Athletics: Track and field
- Alumni name: Paduan
- Website: www.ebenezer-shs.edu.gh

Ebenezer Senior High School, is a public secondary educational institution in Ghana and operates as a non-denominational and mixed school. It is located in Mpoase, near Dansoman in Accra, in the Ablekuma West Municipal District of the Greater Accra Region of Ghana.

A graduate of Ebenezer is referred to as a "Paduan". Anastasia Afua Konadu is the current headmistress of the school.

== History ==
Ebenezer Senior High School, formerly known as Ebenezer Secondary School, was founded on 22 April 1941 by Robert Teiko Aryee, as a private school in the Gold Coast, Ghana. He started the school with only 6 students in a room where he was also living in Ayalolo, Accra. The school was later relocated to Korle Gonno and then to Mamprobi in 1952. R.T. Aryee and his nephew E.K.A. Otoo (father of Ayikoi Otoo) ran the school as headmaster and assistant headmaster respectively at the time, until the government took over the school and appointed C.E.A. Martinson as headmaster in 1956.

The name "Ebenezer" was taken from Eben-Ezer which means stone of help.

In 1981, the school became a senior secondary school as a result of a change in the Ghana Education Service policy. The school is a semi-autonomous secondary educational institution and operates mostly with the aid of a school Board of Governors (BOG), a Parent-Teacher Association (PTA) and an Old Students' Association (OSA).

At the 5th Ghana Renewable Energy Fair & National Energy Symposium in Accra, the school participated in the Renewable Energy and Energy Efficiency Project competition and won the first prize. It was organized by the Ministry of Energy and Petroleum and Energy Commission.

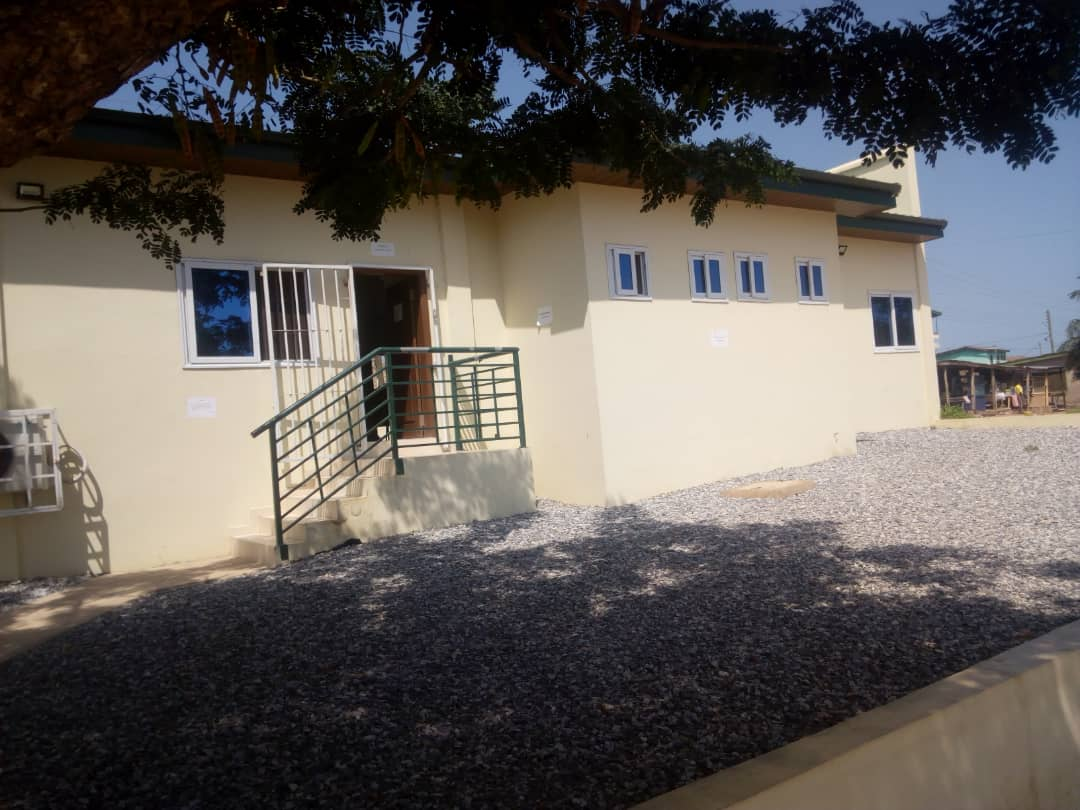
E-library facility at School

=== Building history ===
The school has an administration block, two 18-unit academic classroom blocks, a science block, and an assembly hall. The school also has an e-library facility.

A girls' dormitory began by the government in 2008 and a science laboratory in 2016 have still not been completed. A visual arts building started by the Parent Teacher Association (PTA) several years ago has stalled.

In June 2019, MTN Ghana Foundation started the construction of the Information and Communication Technology (ICT) Centre building in the school. The centre with a Robotic laboratory facility and an e-library was completed in November 2020 and inaugurated by MTN Ghana's CEO Selorm Adadevoh.

In October 2020, Ebenezer Old Students Association (EOSA) launched the Padua Regeneration Programme to rebuild and transform the derelict structures of the school into a modern one.

== Insignia ==
Object	Significance
Bible	Signifies Christian values
Rock	Signifies Solid and unwavering foundation
Palm Tree	Signifies Steadfastness
Dove	Signifies High aspirations and hope
Semper Perstate	School motto written in Latin, translates to "Always Persevere"

== Academics ==
The school focuses on programmes which includes general arts, general science, agriculture, business, home economics, and visual arts.

The school like other government run senior high schools in Ghana, operates a three-year academic cycle, from form one to form three. At the end of the third year, students have to pass the West African Senior School Certificate Examination (WASSCE) to obtain a certificate to mark the completion of secondary education and to proceed to tertiary education.

== Houses ==
The school has four houses and each student is assigned a house when admitted into the school. The houses are named after the founder and former teachers of the school. The names of the houses are: Aryee House, Freeman House, Martinson House, and Otoo House.

== Sports ==
The school participates in sporting competitions nationwide and is renowned for football (soccer), field hockey, handball and athletics in inter college sports competitions.

== Old Students Association ==
The Ebenezer Old Students Association (EOSA) is an association of old students of the school. The association has a governing body consisting of: a president, vice president, general secretary, treasurer, financial secretary and a public relations officer elected at an annual general meeting. They have the responsibility of planning and executing all programmes or events that are organised by the association. It also serves as a liaison between the alumni and the school. The association also supports the school in funding the regeneration of its old and derelict infrastructure.

An old student of the school is referred to as a "Paduan".

== Faculty ==
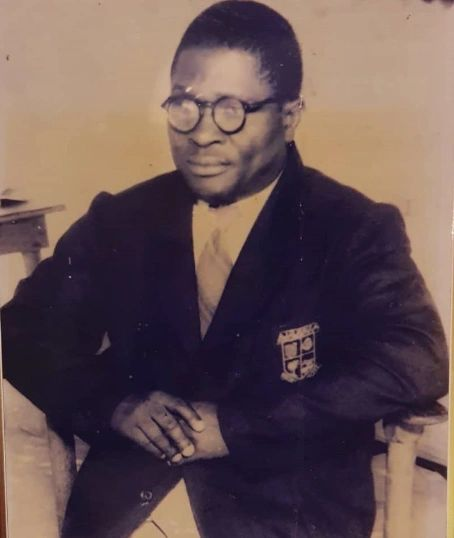
Robert Teiko Aryee, founder of the school

Headteachers

Headteachers	Tenure in office
Robert Teiko Aryee	1941—1956
Charles E.A. Martinson	1956—1974
Vincent B. Freeman	1974—1986
Nancy Thompson	1986—1997
Nicholas S. Dei	1997—2002
Samuel Ofori-Adjei	2002—2005
Elizabeth A. Addo	2005—2017
Richard Kofi Mensah	2017—2020
Anastasia Afua Konadu	2020—present

== Criticism ==
In December 2019, while on a high school tour in Dansoman before his annual "Saminifest" concert, Ghanaian musician Samini went to Ebenezer Senior High School to address students but the headmaster at the time, Richard Kofi Mensah, prevented him from entering the school. Samini later claimed that the refusal was because of his dreadlocks (Rastafari) and for this reason the headmaster thought he "was not fit to speak to the students of the school." Replying to Samini, headmaster Richard Mensah confirmed that he did not prevent Samini from addressing the students because of "the dreadlocks", stating "I have a student in my school who has dreadlocks, a girl.", rather it was because it was the school's exams week. The headmaster and the president of Old Students Association, Lloyd Evans, both confirmed that Samini's letter which he sent to the school to get approval to address the students hadn't yet been approved.

== See also ==
- Education in Ghana
- List of senior secondary schools in Ghana
