= Mae-Ling Lokko =

Ghanaian-Filipino designer and artist (born 1987)

Mae-ling Lokko
- Born: October 17, 1987 (age 38); Taif, Saudi Arabia
- Citizenship: Ghana and Philippines
- Education: Tufts University; Rensselaer Polytechnic Institute
- Occupations: Designer, educator, architectural scientist, artist
- Website: www.maelokko.com

Mae-Ling Lokko (born 17 October 1987) is a Ghanaian-Filipino designer, academic and artist. She is best known for her research, art and work on fungi, plants, agricultural waste and renewable biobased building materials in relation to ecological health and social justice. In her artistic and design practice, she focuses upon investigating and prototyping participatory models of production. Lokko is an assistant professor at Yale University's School of Architecture.

== Early life and education ==
Mae-ling Jovenes Lokko was born in Taif, Saudi Arabia, to a Ghanaian surgeon and Filipino nurse. She grew up in Oxford, Grenada, Malaysia, Philippines and in Ghana where she attended boarding school.

Lokko studied architecture and African in the New World politics at Tufts University, during which she spent a year studying at the Bartlett School of Architecture. She completed her master's and Ph.D. in architectural sciences at the Center for Architecture, Science and Ecology] (CASE), when it was an academic-industrial alliance between Rensselaer Polytechnic Institute and Skidmore, Owings and Merrill in New York City.

== Work ==
Lokko is best known for her academic research, artistic practice and architectural teaching around agricultural waste, fungi and plants that advocate for the design and scaling of biobased global material value chains around generative justice goals. Her research focuses on the broad development and matching of biobased resources towards high-value material applications. She is the founder of AMBIS Technologies (2015-2018) and Willow Technologies (2017-present), both focused on the upcycling agricultural waste into affordable, low-carbon building materials and for water quality treatment applications. In 2023, Lokko was the co-author of a major United Nations Environment Programme, Global ABC and Yale Center for Ecosystems in Architecture global report “Building Materials and Climate: Constructing a New Future.”

Lokko's artistic practice focuses on the revaluing of waste through biomaterial design and biophilic aesthetics, drawing on new interpretations of architectural, landscape and industrial spaces. She has been influenced by Ghanaian sculptor and artist, El Anatsui, who invited her to do a residency in 2020-21 during. Lokko curated his Anatsui's first show in Dubai and designed a large extension for his artistic studio in Ghana completed in 2023. In her 2022 exhibition Grounds for Return at Z33 House for Contemporary Art, Design and Architecture in Belgium, Lokko reconstructed the “Threshold of Return” from high-strength coconut waste husks in reference to the “Doors of No Return” across Ghanaian slave forts, a symbol of Transatlantic slavery and commodity extraction.

Lokko's interests extend from the technical design and aesthetics of biobased materials to social and industrial infrastructures that enable access to participating in new material value chains. In 2018, as part of the Liverpool Biennial, she worked together with over 150 multigenerational volunteers from Squash Nutrition Liverpool, Windsor Street Farmers, Windsor Primary School and Liverpool Life Sciences UTC High School to demonstrate the distributed growing fungi-based materials and onsite building of a shipping container structure from at the Royal Institute of British Architects-North.

== Teaching ==
Lokko serves as an assistant professor at the Yale School of Architecture. Previously she served as assistant professor and director of the Building Sciences program at Rensselaer Polytechnic Institute. Prior to Yale, Lokko taught at Cooper Union in New York City.

She lives and works in New York City and Accra, Ghana.

== Awards and residencies ==
- Future by Design, British Council (2021)
- Black Rock Residency (2019)
- Hublot Design Prize Finalist (2019)
- El Anatsui Tema Artist Residency (2020)
- Folly Tree Arboretum Residency (2020)
- SOM Foundation Research Prize (2019)
- Atelier Luma Residency, Luma Foundation (2018)
- Housing the Human Competition Winner (2018)
- Rotch Foundation Travel Studio Grant (2015)

== Exhibitions ==
- The Museum of Modern Art, New York (2024)
- The Museum of Modern Art, New York (2023)
- The Nobel Prize Museum, Stockholm (2023)
- Serralves Foundation, Portugal (2022-2023)
- Z33 House of Contemporary Art, Design and Architecture, Belgium (2021)
- Museum of the Future, Dubai (2022-2024)
- Stedelijk Museum, Netherlands (2022)
- Triennale Milano, Italy (2020)
- Somerset House, United Kingdom (2020)
