= J. K. Okine =

Ghanaian headmaster

Jacob Korley Okine
- Born: Jacob Korley Okine; 5 August 1926; Accra
- Died: 2018 (aged 92)
- Education: Accra Academy; Achimota College
- Alma mater: University College of the Gold Coast
- Occupation: teacher
- Known for: Headmaster of Accra Academy
- Spouse: Comfort Allotey (m. 1956)

Jacob Korley Okine (1926 - 2018) was a Ghanaian teacher and city councillor. He was headmaster of Accra Academy from 1967 to 1986. He was the third head of the school. He was Presiding Member of the Accra City Council from 1987 to 1994.

== Early life ==
Jacob Korley Okine was born on 5 August 1926 in Accra. His parents were James Tawiah Okai and Dede Wusu.

Okine's elementary education was at Accra United School. He continued at Accra Academy from 1939 to 1945. There, he was the headboy in his final year. He studied at the intermediate department of Achimota College from 1946 to 1948. His mates at the department included Alex Kwapong, P. K. K. Quaidoo, Daniel Francis Annan, Patrick Anin and Alex Quaison-Sackey. In 1950, he was admitted to the University College of the Gold Coast and received the University of London's B. A. in Mathematics in 1952.

== Career ==
Okine was a non-graduate tutor at Accra Academy from 1948 to 1950 when he took leave for further studies. In 1952, he returned to Accra Academy as a graduate tutor. He taught mathematics, English and Latin. In 1960, he was appointed senior mathematics master and school librarian with responsibility for the school's timetable. In May 1962, he was appointed as assistant headmaster to A. K. Konuah to replace J. A. Halm-Addo. With this, he assumed the duties of secretary of the Board of Governors.

In October 1967, Okine was appointed headmaster of Accra Academy. In 1973, he became a mathematics moderator for the West African Examinations Council after being a chief examiner of the examination body for ten years. In 1973, again, he became chairperson of the Greater Accra Regional branch of the Conference of Heads of Assisted Secondary Schools, a position he held for five years. From 1977 to 1979, he served on the National Advisory Council on Curriculum Development. Okine was a member of the Ghana National Committee of WAEC from 1978 to 1981. In 1980 he became a member of council of WAEC and served on the council until 1983. In 1986, Okine retired from the Ghana Education Service and left office as headmaster of Accra Academy upon reaching the age of sixty years. He handed over to Vincent Freeman.

In 1987, Okine was appointed as a member of the Accra City Council and served as the presiding member of the city council for two four-year terms from 1987 to 1994. He was the representative of the Accra City Council on the Consultative Assembly that drafted the 1992 Constitution of Ghana. On 31 January 2015, Okine was presented a citation by the Accra Metropolitan Assembly (formerly Accra City Council) for being its longest serving presiding member at a ball.
