= Kasey =

Kasey is a unisex given name, nickname and ring name which may refer to:

== Women ==
- Kasey Boucher (born 1990), American ice hockey player
- Kasey Brown (born 1985), Australian squash player
- Kasey Campbell, an early member of the group The Pussycat Dolls
- Kasey Carlson (born 1991), American swimmer
- Kasey Chambers (born 1976), Australian country singer-songwriter
- Kasey Evering (born 1983), Jamaican netball player
- Kasey Lansdale (born 1988), American country musician
- Kasey Rogers (1925–2006), American actress born Josie Imogene Rogers
- Kasey Smith (born 1990), Irish singer

== Men ==
- Kasey Green (born 1979), former Australian rules footballer
- Kasey Hayes (born 1985), American former professional bull rider
- Kasey James, ring name of former professional wrestler Kurt Sellers (born 1982)
- Kasey Kahne (born 1980), American stock car racer
- Kasey Keller (born 1969), American former soccer player
- Kasey Palmer (born 1996), English footballer
- Kasey Peters (born 1987), American football player
- Kasey Studdard (born 1984), American football offensive guard
- Kasey Wehrman (born 1977), Australian footballer

== See also ==
- Casey (given name)
- Kacey, a list of people with the given name or nickname
- Kaycee (disambiguation), including a list of people with the given name
- Kacie, a list of people with the given name
