= Brendan Adams =

American basketball player (born 2000)

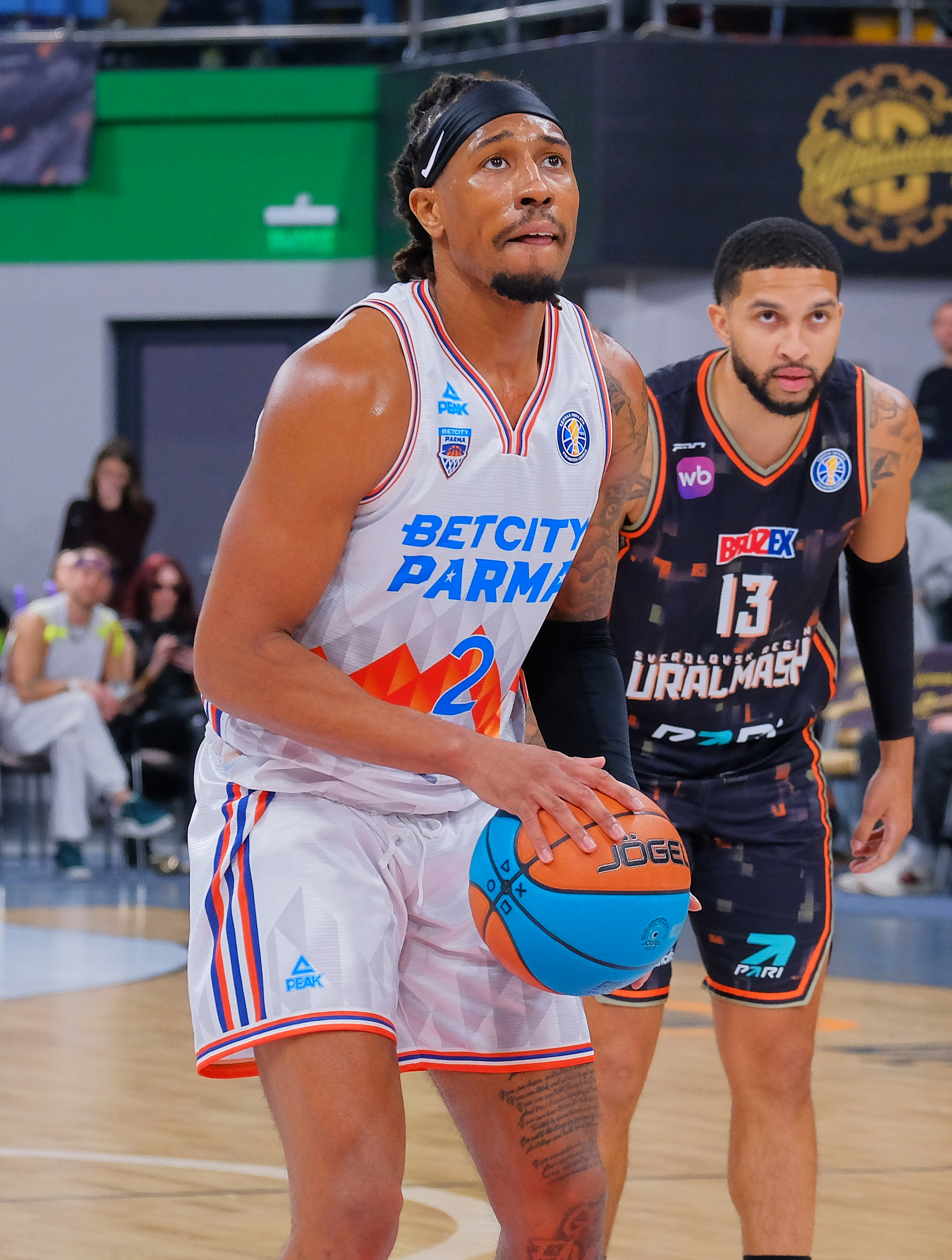
- Adams with Parma in December of 2025

No. 22 – UNICS Kazan
- Position: Point guard
- League: VTB United League

Personal information
- Born: April 3, 2000 (age 26) Baltimore, Maryland, U.S.
- Listed height: 6 ft 4 in (1.93 m)
- Listed weight: 205 lb (93 kg)

Career information
- High school: Calvert Hall (Towson, Maryland)
- College: UConn (2018–2021); George Washington (2021–2023)
- NBA draft: 2023: undrafted
- Playing career: 2023–present

Career history
- 2023: VEF Rīga
- 2023–2024: Darüşşafaka
- 2024: Samara
- 2024–2025: Hapoel Holon
- 2025–2026: Parma
- 2026–present: UNICS Kazan

Career highlights
- Third-team All-Atlantic 10 (2023); Most Improved Player of the Year All-Atlantic 10 (2023); All-Academic Team All-Atlantic 10 (2023)

Brendan D'Andrae Adams (born April 3, 2000) is an American professional basketball player for UNICS Kazan of the VTB United League. Standing at a height of 6 ft 4 in (1.93 m), he plays the point guard position.

== High school career ==
Adams attended Calvert Hall College High School in Towson, MD. In October 2017, Adams committed to University of Rhode Island. He was ranked number 36 point guard nationally by 247Sports.com. In 2017-18 he averaged 21 points, 4 rebounds, and 3 assists per game for Calvert.

== College career ==
=== University of Connecticut (2018-2021) ===
Adams was originally recruited to play for Coach Dan Hurley at University of Rhode Island, but switched his commitment to University of Connecticut after Hurley became the team's head coach.

In 2018–2019, Adams appeared in 31 games and made one start against University of Cincinnati. He averaged 2.6 points and 1.2 rebounds. He finished third on the team in free throw percentage.

In 2019–2020, he appeared in 31 games and made one start. He averaged 7.4 points and 2.2 rebounds. He was honored on UCONN's 3.0 GPA Night and named to AAC All-Academic Team.

In 2020–2021, he played in 16 games and made 6 starts. He averaged 4.5 points and 2.1 rebounds.

=== The George Washington University (2021-2023) ===
Adams joined George Washington University from 2021 to 2023. During the 2021–2022 season, he appeared in 29 games and started in 14. He averaged 8.2 points, 3.7 rebounds and 2.1 assists per game.

During the 2022–2023 season he was named Atlantic 10 Conference Chris Daniels Most Improved Player, Third Team All-Conference and All-Academic. He started and appeared in all 32 games. Adams averaged a career-high 17.4 points (5th in the conference), 4.2 rebounds and 2.9 assists per game, with a 47.0% field goal percentage (7th), 83.5% free throw percentage (5th).

On November 28, 2022, Adams was named the Atlantic 10 Conference co-Player of the Week. This was the first career award for him.

== Professional career ==
After going undrafted, Adams played for the Minnesota Timberwolves in NBA 2K24 Summer League in Las Vegas.

On August 6, 2023, Adams signed with VEF Rīga in Latvian-Estonian Basketball League and Basketball Champions League. He averaged 12.8 points, 5 assists and 2.7 rebounds.

On December 29, 2023, he signed with Darüşşafaka of the Turkish Basketbol Süper Ligi (BSL).

On July 23, 2024, Adams signed with Samara of VTB United League. He averaged 14.6 points, 2.1 rebounds, and 4.0 assists per game, while shooting 50.9% from the field, 47.8% from three-point range (9th in the VTB United League), and 80.8% from the free throw line.

On December 5, 2024, Adams signed with Hapoel Holon of the Israeli Basketball Premier League.

On August 8, 2025, Adams signed with Parma of VTB United League. On October 27, 2025, Adams received a Hoops Agents Player of the Week award after having 18 points and 11 assists.

== Personal life ==
His parents are Yolanda and Darryl Adams. His older brother Jaylen Adams is a professional basketball player as well. He also has three younger sisters.
