= Andie Case =

American singer-songwriter (born 1992)

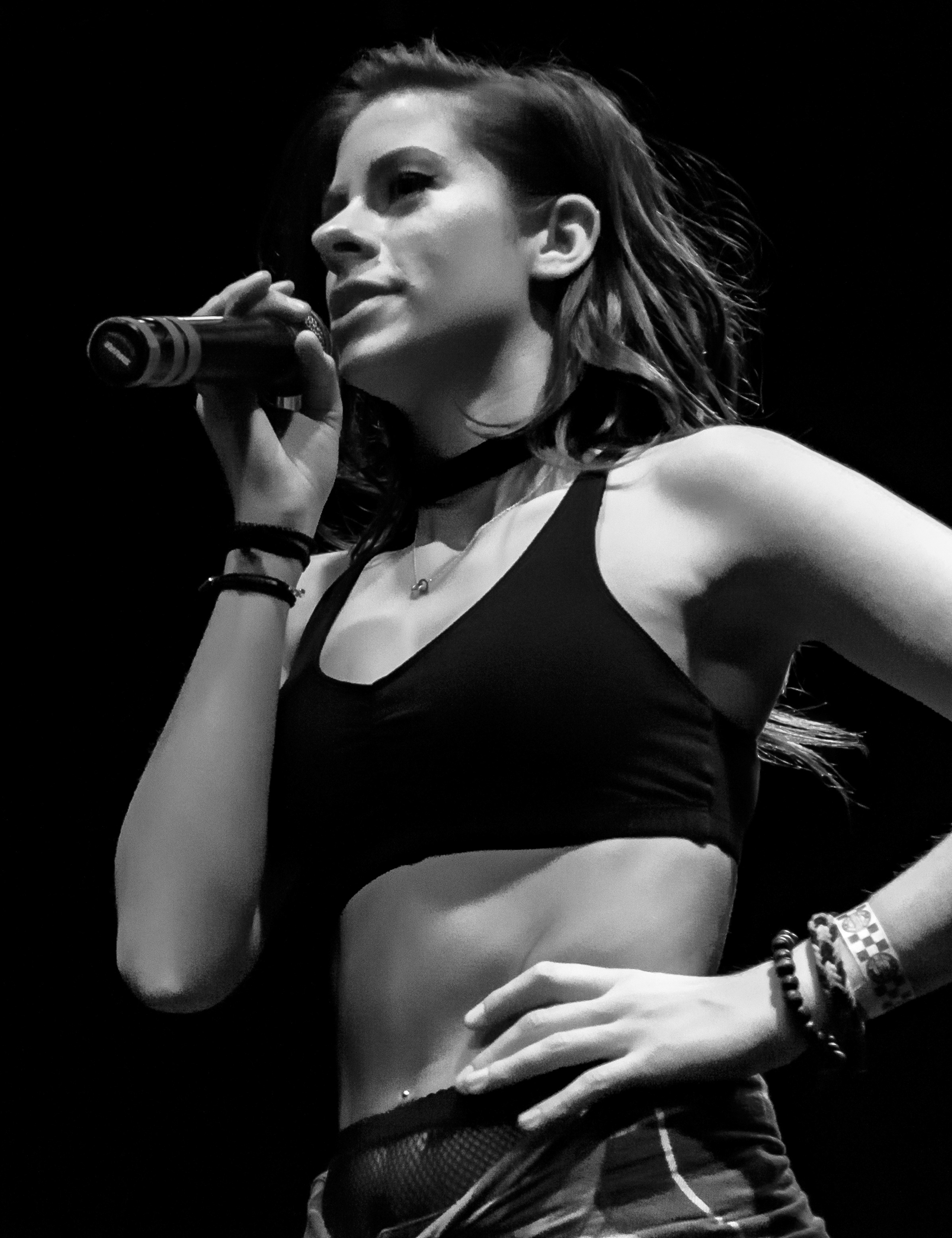
- Case performing live in 2016

Background information
- Born: Andrea Case; June 12, 1992 (age 34); Eugene, Oregon, U.S.
- Genres: Pop; pop rock; R&B
- Occupations: Singer, YouTuber
- Website: www.andiecase.com

Andie Case (born June 12, 1992) is an American singer, songwriter, and model based in Seattle from Eugene, Oregon. She gained worldwide popularity after covering songs by popular artists on her YouTube channel, including Rixton and Jason Derulo, as well as performing her own songs.

== Musical career ==
Case started singing publicly during the fifth grade talent show and has pursued a musical career ever since. Case draws inspiration from singers such as Kelly Clarkson, Christina Aguilera, Hayley Williams, and Demi Lovato. She was part of the Girls Night In tour that began in 2014.

Case's original compositions are available on iTunes, while she continues to work on an EP release. Her song "Want to Want Me/I Want You to Want Me Mashup" was identified as number seven in the top ten Spotify "most viral" tracks of June 2015 in the United Kingdom. The single spent three weeks on the UK Singles Chart, peaking at number 24. Her Know No Boundaries solo tour was held in 2016 and included bandmates Ajay Marshall and Naph Smith.

=== Competitions and reality shows ===
In 2015, Case was mentored by Dave Navarro in an episode of Breaking Band. The episode was screened in January 2016. The show focused on pairing established, famous musicians with emerging musicians.

On December 15, 2017, Case won the grand prize of US$1 million in Usher's Megastar Talent Competition, a mobile app-based competition.

== Personal life ==
She is one of seven children. When she released her original single "Be Myself" on YouTube in April 2018, her summary noted that the song was about her bisexuality.
