= John S. Case =

American politician

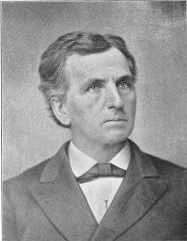

Member of the Maine House of Representatives
- In office 1880–1881

Mayor of Rockland, Maine
- In office 1884–1885
- Preceded by: George Gregory
- Succeeded by: Benjamin Williams

Mayor of Rockland, Maine
- In office 1880–1881
- Preceded by: John Lovejoy
- Succeeded by: George Gregory

Member of the Maine House of Representatives
- In office 1868–1869

President of the Rockland, Maine Common Council
- In office 1863–1863
- Preceded by: E. R. Spear
- Succeeded by: George W. Kimball, Jr.

Member of the Rockland, Maine Common Council Ward 3
- In office 1862–1863
- Preceded by: L. C. Pease
- Succeeded by: George W. Kimball, Jr.

Personal details
- Born: Belgrade, Maine
- Party: Republican
- Spouse: Lucy C. White

John S. Case (February 15, 1823, Belgrade, Maine – May 10, 1902, Rockland, Maine) was a Republican politician from Maine who served as the mayor of Rockland, and as a member of the Maine House of Representatives. Case was the son of Ambrose Case and Susan Sawyer. In 1852 Case married Lucy C. White, they had two children, a son and daughter.

== Sources ==
Chase, Henry (1893), Representative Men of Maine: A Collection of Portraits with Biographical Sketches of Residents of the State, Who Have Achieved Success And are Prominent in the Commercial, Industrial, Professional and Political Life, To which is Added the Portraits and Sketches of All the Governors Since the Formation of the State, Portland, Maine: Lakeside Press

Political offices
Preceded by John Lovejoy	Mayor of Rockland, Maine; 1880 –1881	Succeeded by George Gregory
Preceded by George Gregory	Mayor of Rockland, Maine; 1884 –1885	Succeeded by Benjamin Williams
Preceded by E. R. Spear	President of the Rockland, Maine; Common Council; 1863 –1863	Succeeded by George W. Kimball, Jr.
Preceded by L. C. Pease	Member of the Rockland, Maine; Common Council; Ward 3; 1862 –1863	Succeeded by George W. Kimball, Jr.
