= Accra–Winneba Highway =

Road in Ghana

The Accra–Winneba Highway is a major highway in Ghana. Completed in May 2007, the highway links Accra, the capital of Ghana to Winneba, the capital of the Effutu Municipal District of the Central Region. The highway also connects the country's capital with other major highways that link Cape Coast and Takoradi in the Western Region.

Since its opening on 4 June 2007, at least three fatal incidents have occurred on the Accra–Winneba Highway. The first of these instances, in which a truck carrying produce overturned on 27 May 2024, killed two women and injured seven others. In response, the police reminded citizens to be more cautious when transporting heavy loads.

On 5 June 2024, parts of the Accra–Winneba Highway near Okyereko collapsed after a contractor diverted one of the largest rivers in the Central Region, Ayensu River, leading to an unexpected rise in water levels, which left commuters stranded and over 150 houses flooded in at least five communities in the Central Region. The contractor working on the road blocked the main bridge in order to build another bridge. As reconstruction efforts commenced, Robert Hackman of the National Disaster Management Organisation advised citizens to commute through alternative roads through Winneba.

Following a rock blasting incident, which killed at least four people on 14 October 2024, on the Buduburam stretch of the Accra—Winneba Highway, residents of Kasoa accused the contractor of failing to tell them beforehand, as they have done so in the past. Two of the Chinese contractors were manhandled as one resident smashed a contractor's head with a large plank of wood.

== Photo gallery ==

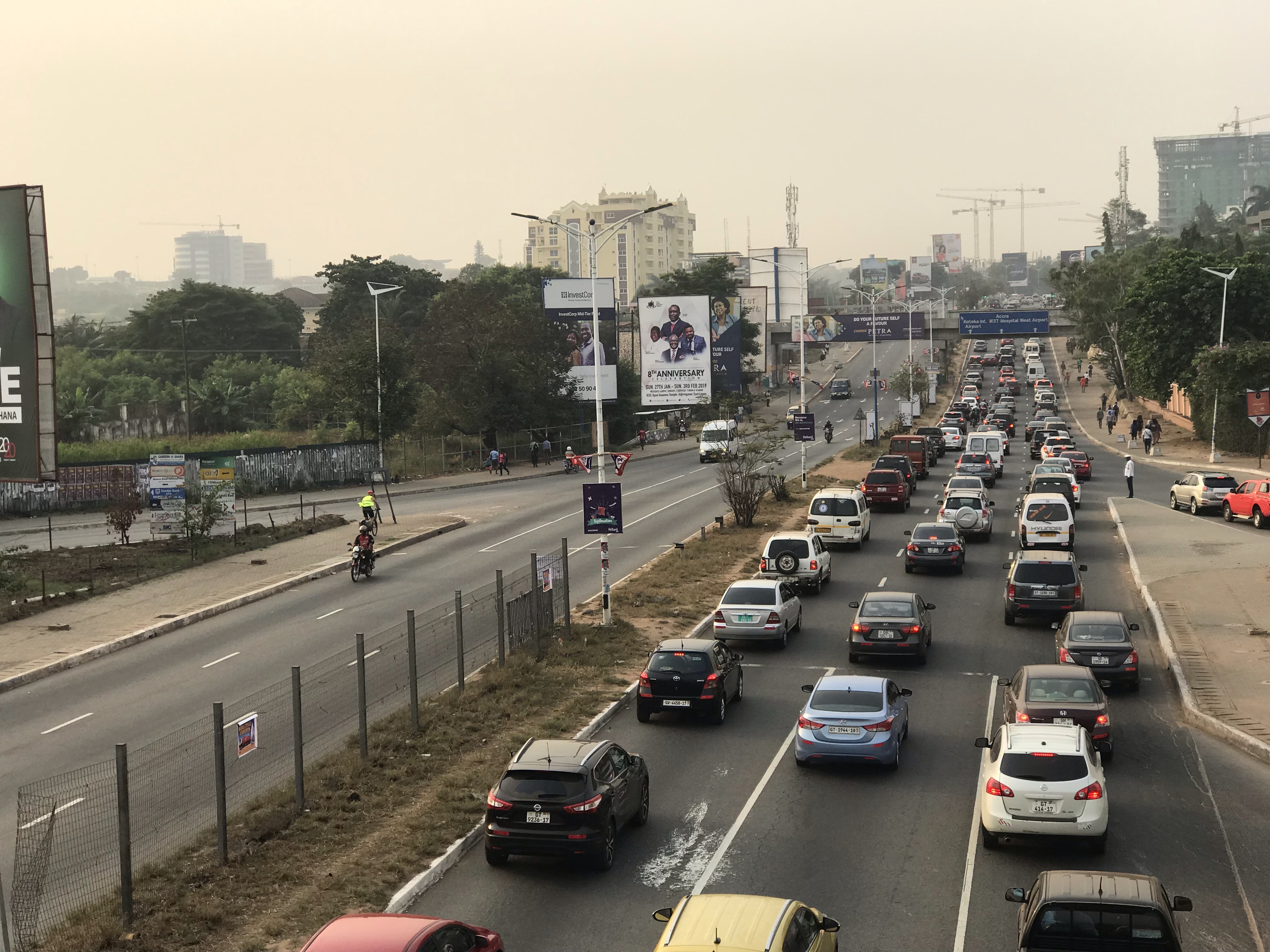

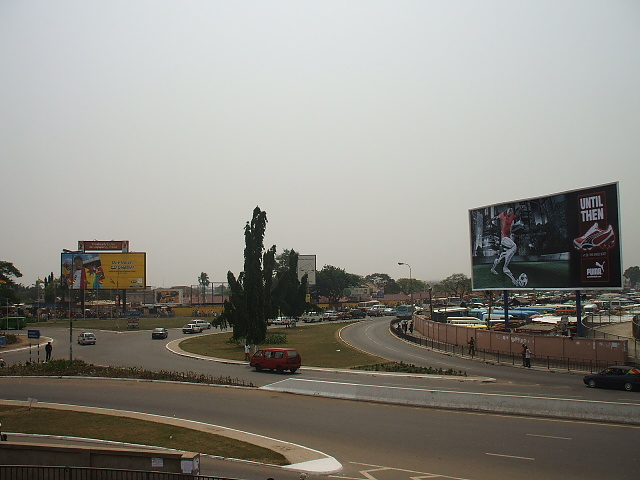

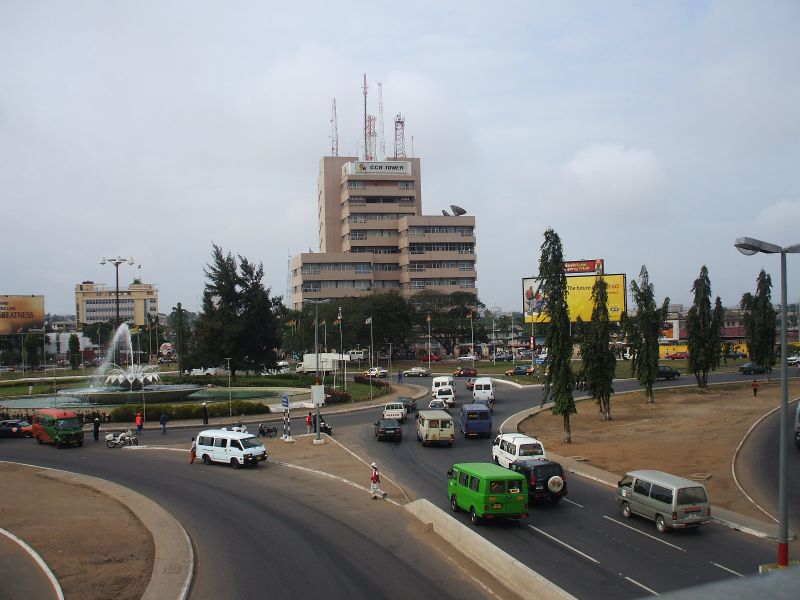
