= Mario Armstrong =

Radio/television talk show host

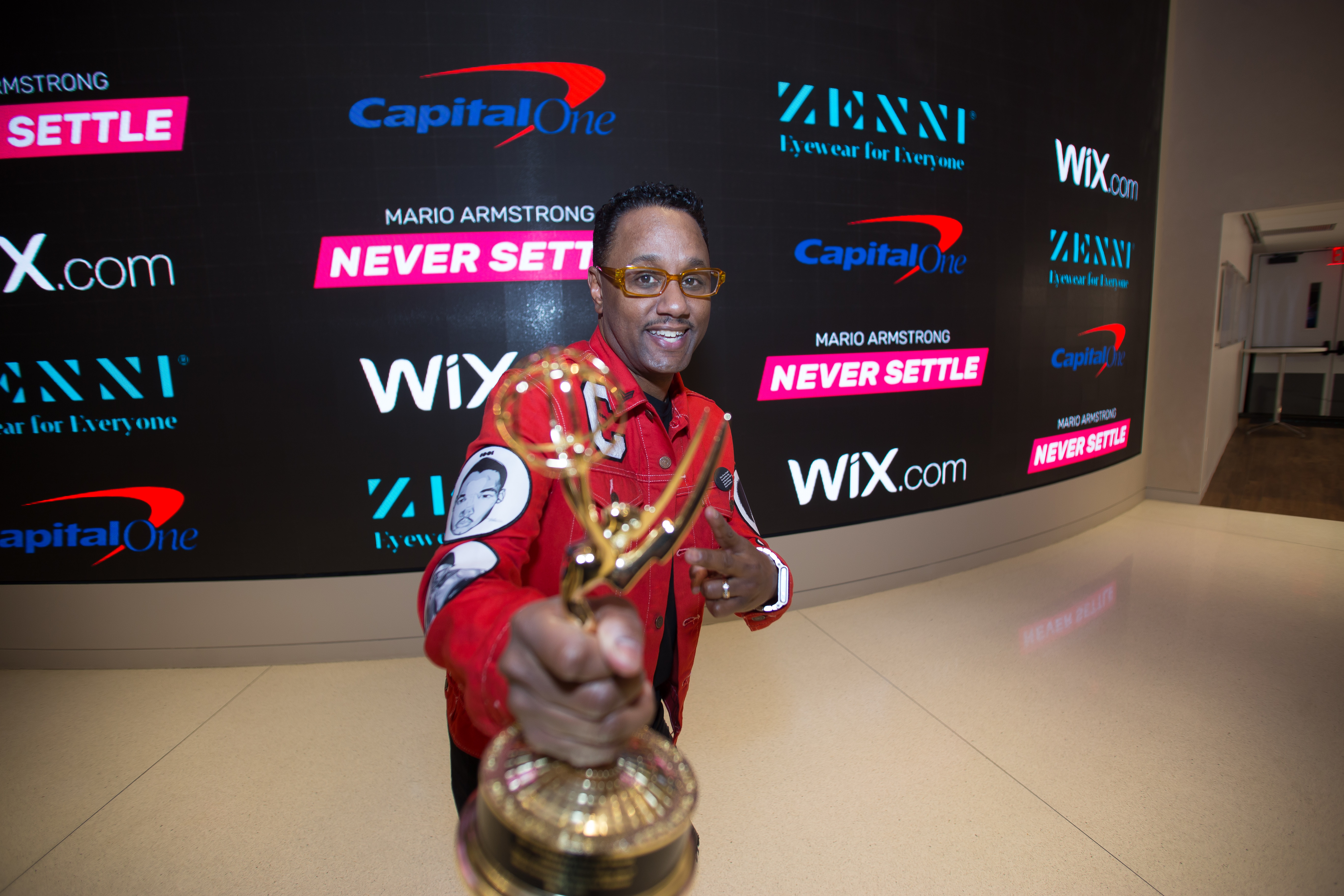
- Born: Baltimore, Maryland
- Occupations: Content Creator, Entrepreneur, Public Speaker, TV Host, Emcee and Digital Lifestyle Expert
- Notable credit(s): TODAY show HLN; CNN; NPR
- Spouse: Nicole Armstrong
- Children: Christopher Armstrong

Mario Armstrong is an American radio and television talk show host, entrepreneur, podcaster and public speaker. Armstrong appears regularly on the Today show, CNN, HLN, the American Urban Radio Networks and NPR's Morning Edition. His self-titled radio show, "The Mario Armstrong Show", ran on Sirius XM Satellite Radio and in syndication for 3 years.

Since 2018, he has published a daily motivational podcast called "Wake Up and Level Up." His web series, "Never Settle Show" began in 2018. The same year, the show won an Emmy.

== Career ==
Armstrong, through Mario Armstrong Media, creates content for various media outlets. Armstrong also co-founded the Urban Video Game Academy, an educational non-profit program that uses video games to increase students' interest and academic achievement in science, technology and math. Early in his career, he was Baltimore's first chief technology advocate, under then-Mayor Martin O'Malley.

He also made regular appearances in Baltimore media and had a recurring segment on WYPR.
