= Casey Owens =

American soldier and athlete

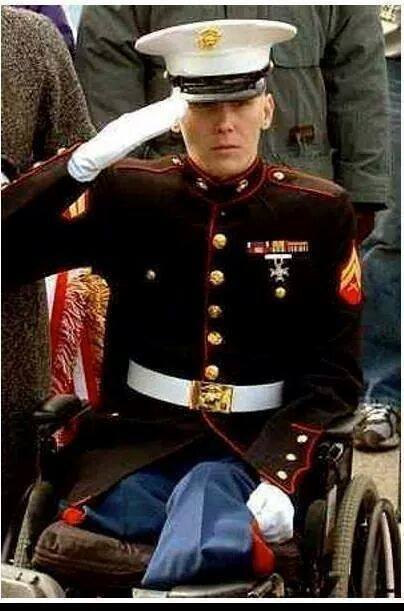
- Born: c. 1981
- Died: October 15, 2014; Aspen, Colorado, United States
- Burial place: Arlington National Cemetery
- Military career
- Allegiance: United States
- Branch: United States Marine Corps
- Service years: 2002–2004
- Rank: Corporal
- Nickname: Superstud
- Conflicts: Iraq War
- Awards: Bronze Star; Purple Heart

Casey Owens (born c. 1981 − October 15, 2014) was a United States Marine, Iraq War veteran, and Paralympic athlete from Houston, Texas, United States. He is best known for completing marathons in a wheelchair after his legs were amputated due to the injuries received while on a rescue mission during the Iraq War.

== Biography ==
Owens deployed for a second tour in Al Anbar Province in Iraq in August 2004. On September 20, 2004, his vehicle struck two anti-tank mines which resulted in severe injuries to his legs. His injuries resulted in the amputation of his right leg above the knee and his left leg below the knee. Owens underwent multiple surgeries and rehabilitation at Bethesda Naval Hospital in Maryland, Walter Reed Army Medical Centerm and Brooke Army Medical Center in San Antonio, Texas. In addition to losing both legs, his injuries included a broken jaw and collarbone, shrapnel wounds, collapsed lungs, and blood clots in the lungs.

The muscle and skin flaps on his amputation stumps failed to close properly and resulted in nonhealing wounds. Owens said he subsequently underwent repeated amputations which further reduced the size of his stumps while a patient at VA and military hospitals. Through his own funds and the help of several charitable organizations, Owens received hyperbaric oxygen therapy in New Orleans, Louisiana by Dr. Paul Harch. In 2008, Owens testified before the United States House Veterans' Affairs Subcommittee on Oversight and Investigations in a hearing regarding the "poor quality of care" and "bureaucratic maze" that military personnel must navigate in order to receive medical care from the VA.

After a return to college which proved unsuccessful due to traumatic brain injury, Owens became an accomplished skier and marathon runner in the Paralympic Games.

== Death ==
Owens struggled with post-traumatic stress disorder and alcohol dependence. He was convicted of drunk driving in 2010, and subsequently entered a recovery and rehabilitation program. In a 2012 interview with CBS News' David Martin, Owens said: "I really don't think I'll ever be free. I don't think the burden of war is ever gone."

Owens died by suicide on October 16, 2014. His memory was honored with an "appreciation party" in Aspen, Colorado on October 18, 2014. He was interred at the Arlington National Cemetery.

The Western Slope Veteran's Coalition Veteran Resource Office in Glenwood Springs Colorado was dedicated to Jesse Beckius and Casey Owens, both Marines that took their own lives.
