= Kaycee =

Kaycee may refer to:

== People ==
- Kaycee Clark (born c. 1988), winner of the 2018 reality show Big Brother 20
- Kaycee Feild (born 1987), American former professional rodeo cowboy
- Kaycee Grogan (fl. 1996), American R&B singer
- Kaycee Hoover (born 1996), American-born Guamanian footballer
- Kelechi Kaycee Madu (born 1973 or 1974), Canadian lawyer and politician
- Kaycee Moore (1944–2021), American actress
- Kaycee Stroh (born 1984), American actress, singer and dancer

== Other uses ==
- Kaycee Nicole, a fictitious person, the center of an internet hoax
- Kaycee, a character in Bratz, an American animated television series
- Kaycee, Wyoming, United States, a town
  - Kaycee School, a public school

== See also ==
- Kacey, a list of people
- Kacie, a list of people
- Kasey, a list of people
- Casey (disambiguation)
