= Casey Jones (outfielder) =

- Right fielder
- Batted: Unknown Threw: Unknown

Negro league baseball debut
- 1934, for the Baltimore Black Sox

Last appearance
- 1934, for the Baltimore Black Sox
- Stats at Baseball Reference

Teams
- Baltimore Black Sox (1934)

Casey Jones was an American professional baseball right fielder in the Negro leagues. He played with the Baltimore Black Sox in 1934.
