= Justice Case (disambiguation) =

Justice Case may refer to:

- Judges' Trial, war crimes prosecution of Nazi jurists and lawyers also known as the Justice Case
- Clarence E. Case (1877–1961), associate justice and chief justice of the New Jersey Supreme Court
- William S. Case (1863–1921), associate justice of the Connecticut Supreme Court
