= Casablanca American School =

School in Californie, Casablanca, Morocco

Coordinates: 33.5369°N 7.6293°W

Location
- Route de la Mecque, Lotissement Ougoug, Quartier Californie; Californie, 20150, Casablanca; Morocco

Information
- School type: International Baccalaureate School Private, Non-Profit
- Established: 1973
- Principal: Richard Vanden Boom (Upper School); Christopher Scot Finch (Lower School)
- Grades: Nursery-12
- Gender: Coeducational
- Classes offered: International Baccalaureate Courses (HL & SL): English, Economics, Business, Physics, Biology, Chemistry, Art, History, Environmental Science, Mathematics (AA and AI), French (A and B), Arabic, and Spanish.
- Colors: Red, Blue, White
- Athletics: Basketball, Football, Badminton, Volleyball, Swimming and Track & Field. (for Middle School, Junior Varsity, and Varsity Levels)
- Mascot: The 'CAS' Cobra
- Nickname: The Cobras
- Accreditation: New England Association of Schools and Colleges
- Website: cas.ac.ma

Casablanca American School is a coeducational, nursery through grade twelve private prep school in Casablanca, Morocco. It is located in the Californie suburbs.

== History ==
The school was founded in 1973 and was the first school in North Africa to offer the International Baccalaureate program.

Casablanca American School is a member of the Mediterranean Association of Independent Schools, the European Council of International Schools, and is accredited by the New England Association of Schools and Colleges. Casablanca American School is supported by the Office of Overseas Schools of the U.S. Department of State.

== Academics ==
Casablanca American School has offered the International Baccalaureate curriculum since 1986. Currently, students in grades 11 and 12 can take Higher Level and Standard Level courses in Chemistry, Economics, English A (Language and Literature), History, Math Studies, Mathematics, Physics, Theatre, Visual Arts, Biology, Business Management, French B, French A (Language and Literature), Arabic B, Spanish A, Spanish B and Computer Science. All students complete an Extended Essay and a Theory of Knowledge course, as per International Baccalaureate requirements.

All classes except language classes are taught in English. Students typically graduate with the goal of attending American, British, or European universities. It is currently ranked 23rd best school in Africa and Best School of Morocco by the African Association of Education.

== Student life ==
The student body is approximately 90% Moroccan, with the remaining 10% representing a number of different nationalities. Most students are bilingual and many are trilingual (fluent in English, French, and Arabic).

The students of the school have participated in annual Model United Nations and Harvard Model Congress Europe conferences in several countries. The school also has organized a chapter of the National Honor Society. Many activities are organized through the National Honor Society chapter.

The school offers athletics, such as basketball, football, badminton, volleyball, baseball, swimming, track, and activities depending on grade levels.

In recent years, the school has developed its performing arts extracurricular offerings. It has hosted a student-run Shakespeare festival and several full-length musicals and even talent shows.
