= John Case (astrologer) =

John Case (c.1660–1700) was an English astrologer and quack doctor, a writer on anatomy, astrology and medicine.

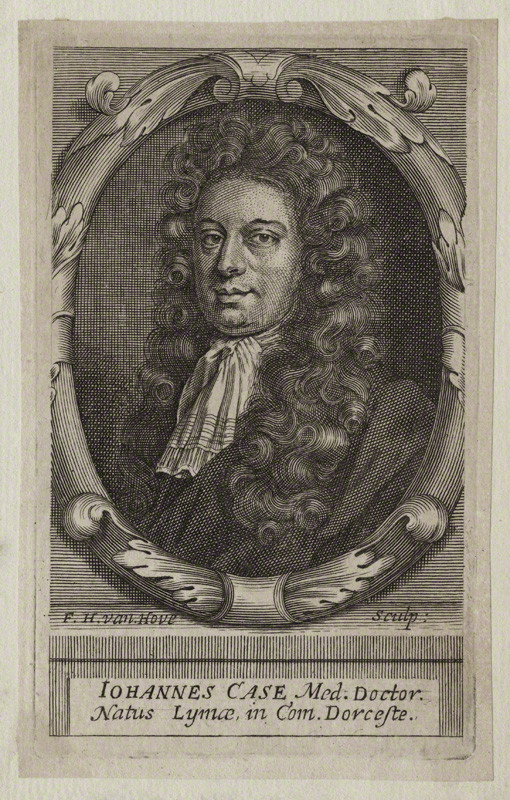
John Case

== Life ==
Case was born about 1660, at Lyme Regis in Dorset. In about 1682, he lived in Lambeth. By 1696, he had placed the letters M.D. after his name, and was living close to Ludgate, having succeeded to the business of Thomas Safford, who had succeeded to that of William Lilly; he was in possession of their apparatus. Over his door he had the verses

Within this place
lives Doctor Case,

and Joseph Addison wrote in The Tatler (No. 240) that Case made more money by them than John Dryden by all his poetical works. It is Doctor Case who, in Alexander Pope's poem, is summoned to attend John Dennis in his "phrenzy".

== Works ==
Case first appears as the author of The Wards of the Key to Helmont proved unfit for the Lock, or the Principles of Mr. Wm. Bacon examined and refuted (London, 1682). The work is a protest against the theory in William Bacon's Key to Helmont that water is the principle of all bodies, and prefixed is a recommendatory epistle by John Partridge, the astrologer. Case's friendship with Partridge is noted by Jonathan Swift.

Case's major work (which in noticed by Haller) was his Compendium Anatomicum nova methodo institutum, which, appearing in 1695 made him a reputation. It appeared again the following year in Amsterdam, and consists of a defence of the opinion of William Harvey and De Graaf upon the generation of animals ab ovo, as for birds. Chalmers expressed some doubt as to whether he really wrote it. He followed this with Ars Anatomica breviter elucidata (London, 1695), and Flos Ævi, or Cœlestial Observations (London, 1696).

In 1697, Case published The Angelical Guide, shewing men and women their lott or chance in this elementary life in IV books. This work was dedicated to his friend, John Tyson, author of The Way to Long Life, Health, and Happiness. The other known work of John Case is Ἐξηγητὴς Ἰατρικός; or the Medical Expositor in an Alphabetical Order in Latine, Greek, and English (London, 1698).
