= Casey Kennedy =

American professional golfer

Personal information
- Full name: Casey Ann Kennedy
- Nationality: United States
- Born: August 19, 1991 (age 35)
- Height: 5 ft 8 in (173 cm)

Career
- Sport: Golf
- College: Auburn University; Augusta State University
- Turned professional: 2015
- Former tour: Symetra Tour

Casey Ann Kennedy (born August 19, 1991) is an American professional golfer who has played on the Symetra Tour.

== Early life ==
Kennedy was raised in Venice, Florida and was a member of the American Junior Golf Association during her childhood, for which she took first place individually in the 2007 AJGA Rhode Island Classic and in 2008 she took first place in the AJGA Woodward Video Junior at the Greenbrier. Another notable win during her childhood was when she was 15 against 11-year-old Lexi Thompson for the title in the 2006 Junior Match Play Invitational. During her high school tenure, Kennedy took top honors in the state of Florida including the 2007 Florida State High School Player of the Year honor. Kennedy committed to attend Auburn University in 2009.

== College career ==
After one season with Auburn, Kennedy decided to transfer for personal reasons to Augusta State University and continued her college career with the university until her graduation in 2014 with a bachelor's degree in Kinesiology.

During her college career, Kennedy continued her track record that she began in high school with three individual collegiate wins and is the current record holder for many school records for the Lady Jaguars. In her first two years at the university, Kennedy assisted the team to consecutive NCAA post-season appearances at the regional level in 2011 and 2012 and in 2014 become the first Augusta State University athlete to have four consecutive post-season appearances.

== Professional career ==
After graduating from Augusta State University, Kennedy served as the assistant coach for the university's women's golf team before deciding to become a professional golfer in December 2014.

During her 2015 rookie season, Kennedy played in three Symetra Tour events and attended the second and third rounds of the LPGA Qualifying school. Due to her showing through qualifying school, Kennedy secured her 2016 Symetra Tour player card.
