= Beatrice Lokko =

Ghanaian tutor (1949 - 2010)

Beatrice Ablah Lokko
- Born: Beatrice Ablah Awadzi; 6 September 1949; Accra
- Died: 10 January 2010 (aged 60)
- Education: Mfantsiman Girls Secondary School; University of Ghana
- Occupation: schoolteacher
- Known for: Headmistress of Accra Academy
- Spouse: Christian Barnor Lokko
- Children: 4

Beatrice Ablah Lokko (6 September 1949 - 10 January 2010) was a Ghanaian teacher who was headmistress of Accra Academy from 1997 to 2005. She was an assistant headmistress from 1990 to 1996 to V. B. Freeman and became acting headmistress in 1996, after Freeman retired. She was later selected and appointed to the role, making her the first woman to become headmistress of the school on permanent basis.

== Early life ==
Beatrice Lokko was born on 6 September 1949. Her parents were Julius Kwashie Awadzi and Agnes Boli Awadzi. She attended Mfantsiman Girls Secondary School at Saltpond between 1963 and 1970 where she obtained her Ordinary and Advanced Level Certificates of Education. She was admitted into the University of Ghana in 1970 and graduated with a B. A. in English in 1973.

== Career ==
In 1973, Lokko was posted to the Accra Academy to do her National Service. In 1974 she was appointed a permanent teacher of English in the school after her service. For the next seven years, she taught in Accra Academy as a tutor of English Literature. In 1981, Lokko was appointed the Head of the English Department of the school, a position she held until 1990 when she was appointed the Assistant Headmistress, Administration to the then headmaster V. B. Freeman. She occupied this position until 1996 when V. B. Freeman went on retirement.

In 1996 she was appointed the acting headmistress for Accra Academy, and later appointed the substantive headmaster in 1997, becoming the first woman and non-old student to head Accra Academy. During her headship of Accra Academy, she occupied the positions of Greater Accra Regional Chairperson of the Conference of Heads of Assisted Secondary Schools (CHASS) and subsequently National Treasurer of CHASS. Lokko gave attention to fencing off the school compound from encroachment. She also supported her students to raise funds for the National Cardiothoracic Centre in 1997.

In 2005, Lokko handed over the position of headmaster to Samuel Ofori-Adjei and left Accra Academy.

After her exit from Accra Academy, she occupied other positions in the Ghana Education Service at different times. These include becoming the district director of education in the Gomoa District in the Central Region, the district director of education for Akuapem-South in the Eastern Region and the acting headmistress of St. Martin's Secondary School, Adoagyiri in Nsawam. In the period of serving as a district director of education, Lokko became a campaigner on child rights issues and HIV AIDs. In September 2010, Lokko went on retirement from the Ghana Education Service.

== Personal life ==
She was married to Christian Barnor Lokko. She met Christian at the Accra Academy where he was a teacher.

== Death ==
Lokko died on Tuesday 10 January 2010. She was buried in Accra on 23 February 2010.
