= Computer Aided Surgery (journal) =

- Discipline: Computer-assisted surgery Health informatics Surgery
- Language: English

Publication details
- Publisher: Taylor & Francis (United Kingdom)

Standard abbreviations
- ISO 4: Comput. Aided Surg.

Indexing
- ISSN: 1092-9088 (print); 1097-0150 (web)

Links
- Journal homepage

The Computer Aided Surgery is a scientific journal covering all aspects of Computer-assisted surgery (CAS), a surgical concept and set of methods, that use computer technology for presurgical planning, and for guiding or performing surgical interventions.

The International Society for Computer Aided Surgery (ISCAS) is involved in the publication of the Journal.
