= Sleeve (disambiguation) =

A sleeve is the part of a garment that covers the arm, or through which the arm passes or slips.

Sleeve may also refer to:

- Arm coverings:
  - A basketball sleeve, an accessory worn by basketball players
  - A sleeve tattoo, a tattoo arrangement that covers most or all of a person's arm
- Cylindrical mechanical protective liners:
  - A sleeve (construction), used by electricians and plumbers to create an opening in cast concrete to permit the passage of a wires or pipes
  - A cylinder sleeve lining the bore of a piston engine
  - A sleeve valve, a type of valve mechanism for piston engines
  - A sleeve bearing to hold a rotating shaft
  - Generally, any tube into which another tube is inserted; in the case of small tubes it is called a thimble
- Other protective covers:
  - A record sleeve, the outer covering of a vinyl record
  - A card sleeve used to protect trading cards from damage during play
  - A beer sleeve or koozie
- A sleeve gastrectomy, a surgical weight-loss procedure
