= Cas (name) =

Cas is a masculine given name and nickname, as well as a surname. Notable people with the name include:

== Given name ==
- Cas Anvar (fl. 1992–present), Canadian actor, voice actor, and writer
- Cas Cremers (born 1974), Dutch computer scientist and professor of Information Security at the University of Oxford
- Cas Haley (born 1980), American singer-songwriter
- Cas Mudde (born 1967), Dutch political scientist
- Cas Oorthuys (1908–1975), Dutch photographer and designer known as Cas
- Cas Spijkers (1946–2011), Dutch chef and cookbook author
- Cas Walker (1902–1998), American businessman, politician, and television and radio personality
- Cas Wouters (1943–2025), Dutch sociologist
- nickname of James Castrission (born 1982), half of Cas and Jonesy, Australian explorers, endurance athletes and motivational speakers

== Surname ==
- Katarina Čas (born 1976), Slovenian actress
- Marcel Cas (born 1972), Dutch former footballer

== See also ==
- Cas Corach, a hero in Irish mythology
- Tál Cas, dynastic founder of the Dál gCais
