= Joseph Case =

Polish rabbi (??–c.1610)

Joseph ben Abraham Case (also Casa or Kaza; Hebrew: יוסף בן אברהם קאזי or קאזא) was one of the foremost Polish rabbis and Talmudists of the end of the sixteenth century and the beginning of the seventeenth; died at Posen about 1610. His name, "Case" or "Kaza" is most probably only a variant of the well-known surname "Cases." This would argue for Italian descent; but it does not agree with the fact that Case called himself "Shapiro," as Bloch has conclusively proved.

After serving as chief rabbi of Lemberg, Case became city rabbi of Posen, while Mordecai ben Abraham Jafe was the district rabbi of Greater Poland. Although Case apparently left no writings, he was one of the first Talmudic authorities of his time, as may be seen from Benjamin Aaron Solnik's responsum No. 22, and Meïr ben Gedaliah of Lublin's responsum No. 88. Case's son Solomon (died January 2, 1612, at Lemberg) was also an eminent Talmudist.
