= Limiting case (philosophy of science) =

In the philosophy of science, under the correspondence principle, a limiting case theory is an earlier theory which becomes incorporated into a later, usually broader theory; that is to say, the earlier (limiting case) theory proves to be a special or limited case of the later theory. Technically, a theory is said to be a limiting case of another, later theory when and if the later theory subsumes the theoretical relations and apparent referents of the earlier one. For example, physicists agree that classical mechanics constitutes a low-energy limiting case of relativity theory.

In words of Larry Laudan, realist philosophers use this phrase in the sense that the theory "T_{1} can be a limiting case of [the theory] T_{2} only if (a) all the variables (observable and theoretical) assigned a value in T_{1} are assigned a value by T_{2} and (b) the values assigned to every variable of T_{1} are the same as, or very close to, the values T_{2} assigns to the corresponding variable when certain initial and boundary conditions—consistent with T_{2}—are specified".

The idea that a theory (in our previous example, Newtonian mechanics) that is close to being true (i.e., that is verisimil) converges as a limiting case into a superior theory (in this example, relativistic mechanics) can be an argument for scientific realism, as the theoretical entities postulated by the previous theories are still considered existent (if one assumes semantic realism, they are considered existent because they are referred to) in the successor theories.
