= Kacie Kinzer =

American designer and interactive artist

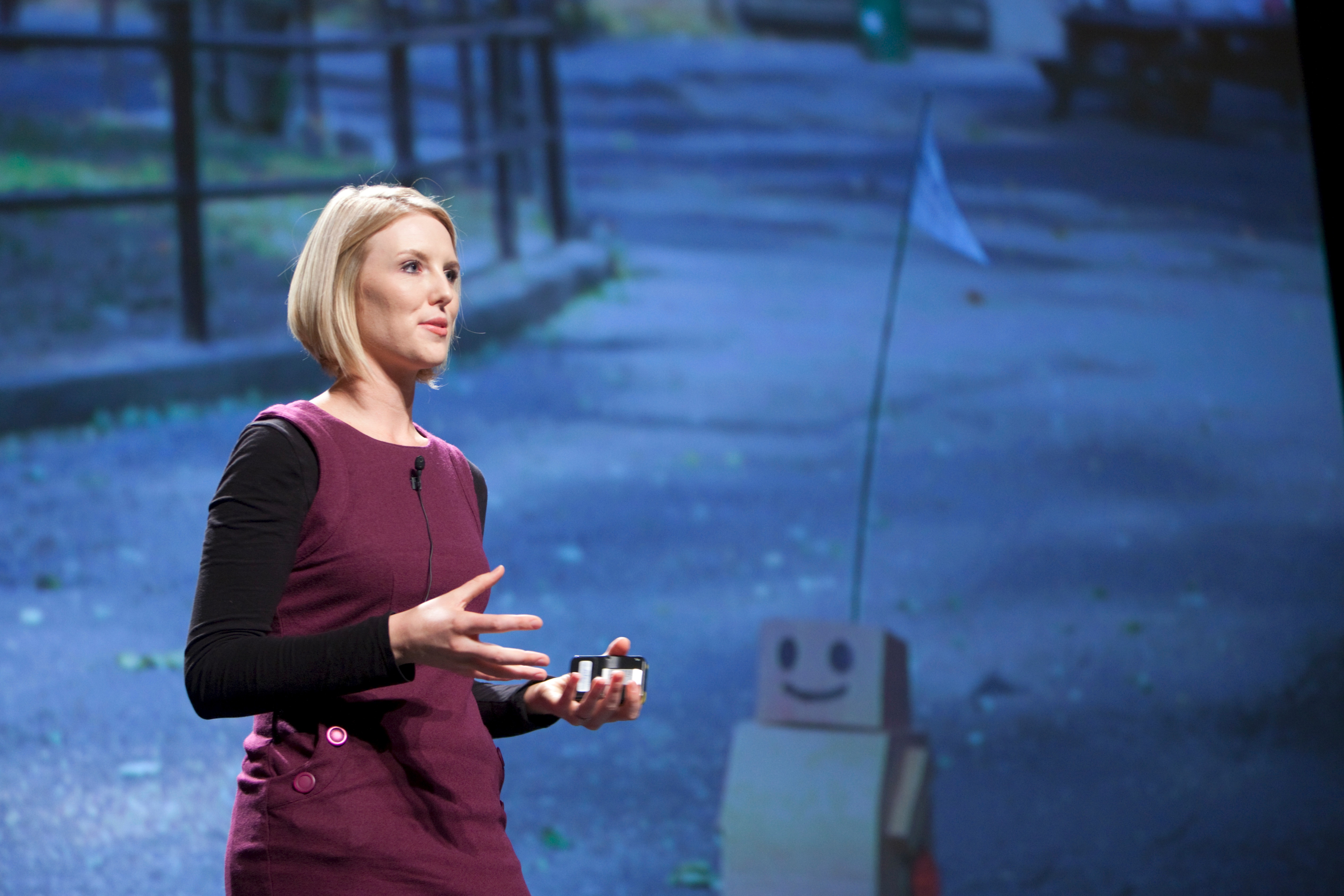
Kacie Kinzer explaining the design choices behind the tweenbot at PopTech 2009

Kacie Kinzer (born 1983) is an American designer and interactive artist. Her best known works are a series of cardboard "tweenbots", which were designed to get help from people, in order to complete their mission: crossing Washington Square Park. The bots were collected by the Museum of Modern Art and part of an exhibit on Design and Communication during 2011. Kinzer spoke at PopTech in 2009.

As of 2017, Kinzer founded and works for the design firm TKOH in New York.
