= Casey Connor =

American lacrosse player (born 1978)

Personal information
- Nationality: American
- Born: March 25, 1978 (age 48) Washington, D.C., U.S.
- Height: 6 ft 2 in (188 cm)
- Weight: 210 lb (95 kg; 15 st 0 lb)

Sport
- Position: Defense
- NLL draft: 49th overall, 2000; Washington Bayhawks
- MLL team Former teams: Washington Bayhawks; Rochester Rattlers
- NCAA team: University of Maryland, College Park
- Pro career: 2001-2008–

Casey Connor (born March 25, 1978) is an American former professional lacrosse player in both Major League Lacrosse and National Lacrosse League. He is the only MLL player in history to score a 2-point goal with both an attack length stick and defensive length stick.

== Professional career ==
MLL

2008: Played in eleven games and registered 9 ground balls. Retired following the season.

2007: Played in eleven games at defense for the Washington Bayhawks. Scored 2 goals tallying 3 points and scooping up 9 ground balls.

2006: Played in eight games for the Bayhawks at both defense and midfield. Scored 4 goals and had 2 assists for 6 points on the year while recording nineteen ground balls. Received the 2006 Bayhawks Unsung Hero Award.

2005: Played in four games during the regular season scoring 1 goal on the year against New Jersey and recording 3 ground balls.

2004: Played in five games with one start during the regular season. Started in the season opener against Rochester and recorded two ground balls. Recorded his first career point with an assist to Gary Gait in a July 17 win against New Jersey.

2003: Traded to the Baltimore Bayhawks prior to the start of the season. Played in 10 games during the regular season making six starts. Recorded a season-high 4 ground balls against Bridgeport on June 12. Finished the season with ten ground balls.

2002: Played in seven games for the Rochester Rattlers before breaking his collarbone at New Jersey June 14. Missed the remainder of the season but recorded 7 ground balls prior to the injury.

2001: Played in twelve regular season games with Rochester. Made MLL playoff debut in loss to Long Island in the semifinals. Recorded one ground ball on the season.

NLL

2002: Played in 5 games, recording 1 assist and 19 ground balls on the season.

2001: Played in 3 games, making opening 2 starts before a near season ending injury. Scored 1 goal and recorded 3 assists, along with a 5 minute Major Penalty for fighting in his NLL debut vs the Buffalo Bandits.

== College career ==
Played college lacrosse at the University of Maryland, College Park where he was named second-team All-American as a senior in 2000 while serving as team captain. Earned honorable mention All-American awards during sophomore and junior seasons. Played in 62 career games at Maryland and made 44 starts. Part of ACC championship team in 1998 during his sophomore year.

== Statistics ==
=== MLL ===
		Regular Season
Season	Team	GP	G	2ptG	A	Pts	GB
2001	Rochester	11	0	0	0	0	14
2002	Rochester	7	0	0	0	0	7
2003	Baltimore	10	0	0	0	0	10
2004	Baltimore	5	0	0	1	1	6
2005	Baltimore	4	1	0	0	1	3
2006	Baltimore	8	4	2	0	6	19
2007	Washington	11	2	1	0	3	9
2008	Washington	9	0	0	0	0	9
MLL Totals		65	7	3	1	11	77
