= Kacey =

Kacey is a unisex given name and nickname which may refer to:

- Kacey Ainsworth (born 1968), English actress
- Kacey Bellamy (born 1987), American ice hockey defenseman
- Kacey Carrig (born 1992), American model
- Kacey Clarke (born 1988), English actress
- Kacey Coppola, half of Kate & Kacey, an American country music duo
- Kacey Jones (1950–2016), American singer-songwriter, producer, and humorist
- Kacey Jost (born 2000), Canadian volleyball player
- Kacey Mottet Klein (born 1998), Swiss actor
- Kacey Musgraves (born 1988), American country music singer
- Kacey Rohl (born 1991), Canadian actress
- Kacey White (born 1984), American soccer midfielder
- Kacey Wong (born 1970), Hong Kong visual artist
- Kvitka Cisyk (1953–1998), nicknamed "Kacey", Ukrainian operatic soprano and symphonic folk singer

== See also ==
- Casey (disambiguation)
- Kasey, a list of people with the given name, nickname or ring name
- Kaycee (disambiguation), including a list of people with the given name
- KC (disambiguation)
