= Center for Architecture, Science and Ecology =

The Center for Architecture, Science and Ecology (CASE) is a research facility of the Rensselaer Polytechnic Institute (RPI), founded in 2007 by Anna Dyson, Professor of Architecture at RPI, and Carl Galioto, senior technical architect at Skidmore, Owings and Merrill (SOM). It started as a joint project of RPI and SOM, and was located in SOM's Wall Street offices in Lower Manhattan.

In 2018, CASE relocated to Industry City in Brooklyn, New York. Since 2025 CASE is directed by Alexandros Tsamis , Associate Professor at RPI School of Architecture. His work focuses on next-generate composite materials, climate adaptive and cyber-physical energy systems, and advanced manufacturing technologies as they relate to advances in computation.

CASE was established at SOM as a collaborative research model to integrate academia with the architecture, engineering, and construction (AEC) industry, aiming to accelerate the deployment of radically disruptive technologies in the built environment. In recent years, the collaborative models has expanded to include several architectural engineering and construction firms as well as multiple other industry partners in the manufacturing space.

CASE has received multiple awards for innovation and sustainability in architecture, including:

2009: LEED Award of Excellence in Education 2009: R+D Award for the Active Modular Phytoremediation System 2012: AIANY Honors Award for collaborative work between SOM and CASE 2012: ACADIA Innovative Academic Program Award 2012: Architectural Record Innovator Award (Second Annual) 2019: Falling Walls Venture First Place for the "CoHEX" innovation 2022: Grand Prize for “AERA,” a building systems integration project
