= Casey Walker (baseball) =

American baseball player

- Catcher
- Born: November 13, 1912
- Died: June 15, 1998 (aged 85); Chicago, Illinois

Negro league baseball debut
- 1937, for the Indianapolis Athletics

Last appearance
- 1937, for the Indianapolis Athletics
- Stats at Baseball Reference

Teams
- Indianapolis Athletics (1937)

Casey Walker (November 13, 1912 – June 15, 1998) was an American Negro league catcher in the 1930s.

Walker played for the Indianapolis Athletics in 1937. In his 12 recorded games, he posted 12 hits and seven RBI in 36 plate appearances. Walker died in Chicago, Illinois in 1998 at age 85.
