= Al Anthony =

American radio personality

Al Anthony (born Almondo Antonio Vincenzo Fiori; 1929 in Endicott, New York) is an American former Los Angeles area radio personality and pioneer rock and roll DJ. Anthony was most well known as a disc jockey for KAFY 550 AM in Bakersfield, California during the 1950s and later at KFXM 590 AM and co-located sister station(KDUO-FM) in San Bernardino, California during the 1960s, where he was also the station's director of operations. Later, he was executive vice president of the Tullis & Hearne California chain of broadcasting stations.

== Military service ==
Anthony served in the Korean War as an aircraft flight engineer / engine mechanic in a B-29 heavy bomber in the United States Air Force. Full four year tour of duty 1949-53 In 1949, he participated in the support crew of the first ever non-stop, around-the-world flight, in a Boeing B-50 Superfortress named Lucky Lady II. The flight took 96 hours and 4 minutes.

== Early radio career ==
After his military service, Anthony graduated from LA State College, where he majored in television and radio broadcasting, under the GI Bill. He concurrently attended Ogden's Radio Operational Engineering School, a short course teaching environment and passed the tests to obtain a First Class FCC Radiotelephone Operators License.

Anthony's first radio jobs were part-time work for KBLA 1500 am in Burbank, California formerly known as KROQ-AM now long gone, and KSPA 1400 am in Santa Paula, California. In 1956, Anthony was hired as a full-time personality at KSLR in Oceanside. He also worked as director of operations of KDEO-AM, San Diego, KFXM-AM, San Bernardino, KDUO-FM, Riverside and director of operations or sales manager for other stations: KWIZ, KQLH, KCAL, KEAP and temp on air, KFWB, KRLA, Los Angeles.

== Film and television ==
He hosted his own TV show, Al Anthony Dance Party, in the 1961–62, on a local Southern California TV station (and syndicated on The Rollins broadcast network)

== AFTRA strike ==
On October 25, 1968, Anthony was the director of operations at KFXM, Tiger Radio 590, when an AFTRA strike resulted in a walkout of the radio station's on-air staff, along with the announcing staff at sister station KDUO-FM. Anthony and other members of the station's management and sales staff immediately took over disc jockeying duties, adopting the mysterious personas of "The Jones Boys". This strategy not only allowed the station to survive the walkout, but resulted in an increase in ratings due to the mystery surrounding the "new" DJs. The true air staff identities of "The Jones Boys" was publicly revealed in a new Tiger Tune Sheet weekly survey format published on July 4, 1969.

He implemented the first and only radio station that owned its own live Bengal tiger during the sixties when 'everything tiger' was the craze. He established "Tiger Radio as the logo/theme for KFXM, KAFY and KDEO, all top rated rock and roll outlets in Southern California.
