= Casey (surname) =

- Language: Old Irish (Anglicized)

Origin
- Meaning: Vigilant or watchful in Battle
- Region of origin: Ireland

Other names
- Variant forms: Caissie; O'Casey; O'Cathasaigh; MacCasey; O'Casaigh

Casey is a common variation of the Irish Gaelic Cathasaigh/Cathaiseach, meaning "vigilant" or "watchful". At least six different septs used this name, primarily in the counties of Cork and Dublin.

People with the surname Casey include:

- Adam Casey (disambiguation)
- Al Casey (disambiguation)
- Albert Vincent Casey (1920–2004), United States Postmaster General
- Ann Casey (1938–2021), American professional wrestler
- Anne Casey, New Zealand–trained nurse based in England, developer of Casey's model of nursing
- Bernie Casey (1939–2017), American football player and actor
- Bill Casey (disambiguation)
- Bob Casey (disambiguation)
- Cathal Casey (born 1967), Irish hurler
- Conor Casey (born 1981), American soccer player
- Cortney Casey (born 1987), American mixed martial artist
- Dan Casey (footballer) (born 1997), Irish association footballer
- Dan Casey (baseball) (1862–1943), American baseball player attributed to the poem "Casey at the Bat"
- Daniel Casey (born 1972), English actor
- Daniel Casey (screenwriter) (born 1981), screenwriter
- Dick Casey (c. 1881–1919), Australian rules footballer
- Don Casey, American basketball coach
- Doug Casey (born 1946), American speculator and writer
- Dwane Casey (born 1957), former head coach of the NBA's Detroit Pistons
- Eamonn Casey (1927–2017), Roman Catholic Bishop Emeritus of Galway and Kilmacduagh, Ireland
- Ed Casey (1933–2006), leader of the Australian Labor Party in Queensland
- Eddie Casey (1894–1966), American football player and coach
- Eduardo Casey (1847–1906), Argentine founder of Venado Tuerto
- Edward Pearce Casey (1864–1940), American architect
- E. Owens Blackburne (1848–1894), pen name of Irish writer and novelist Elizabeth Casey
- Eoghan Casey, digital forensics professional
- Francis Dominic Casey (1890–1917), Irish flying ace of the Royal Naval Air Service
- Frank Casey, American Negro league pitcher
- George Casey (disambiguation)
- Gerard Casey (philosopher) (born 1951), professor emeritus at University College Dublin
- Gerard Casey (artist), Irish artist
- Gerard Casey (Irish republican) (died 1989), a member of the Provisional Irish Republican Army
- Hannah Casey (born 1988), Irish rugby union player
- Harry Wayne Casey (born 1951), American musician
- Hugh Casey (disambiguation)
- Jacqueline Casey (1927–1992) American graphic designer
- James Casey (disambiguation)
- Jim Casey (footballer) (born 1957), Scottish footballer
- Joe Casey, American comic book writer
- John Casey (disambiguation)
- Jon Casey (born 1962), American ice hockey player
- Joseph E. Casey (1898–1980), United States Representative from Massachusetts
- Kage Casey (born 2003), American football player
- Karan Casey (born 1969), Irish folk singer
- Karen Casey (born 1947), Canadian politician
- Kathleen L. Casey (born 1966), commissioner of the U.S. Securities and Exchange Commission
- Ken Casey (born 1969), bass guitarist and frontman of the Boston punk rock band Dropkick Murphys
- Kenneth Casey (1899–1965), American composer and child actor
- Kenneth J. Casey (died 2020), California real estate investor
- Kenneth L. Casey (born 1935), neurologist
- Kevin Casey (disambiguation)
- Len Casey (born 1953), English rugby league footballer
- Louise Casey, Baroness Casey of Blackstock (born 1965), British government official
- Luis Morgan Casey, American/Bolivian Roman Catholic bishop
- Lyman R. Casey (1837–1914), United States Senator from North Dakota
- Maie Casey, Baroness Casey (1892–1983), Australian pioneer aviator, poet, librettist, biographer, memoirist and artist
- Marty Casey (born 1973), American rock musician
- Martyn P. Casey (born 1960), Australian rock bass guitarist
- Maurice Casey (1942–2014) British scholar of the New Testament and early Christianity
- Michael Casey (disambiguation)
- Mickey Casey (1905–1968), American baseball player
- Mike Casey (labor leader) (born 1958)
- Natalie Casey, English actress
- Oliver Casey (born 2000), English footballer
- Owen Casey (born 1969), Irish tennis player
- Paddy Casey, Irish singer-songwriter
- Pat Casey (baseball) (born 1959), American baseball coach
- Pat Casey (politician) (born 1961/2), Irish politician
- Patricia Casey, Professor of Psychiatry at University College Dublin
- Patrick Casey (disambiguation)
- Paul Casey (born 1977), English golfer
- Peter Casey (disambiguation)
- Ray Casey (1900–1986), American tennis player and coach
- Raymond Casey (geologist) (1917–2016), British geologist
- Richard Casey (disambiguation)
- Robert Casey (disambiguation)
- Ron Casey (disambiguation)
- Samuel Casey (disambiguation)
- Sean Casey (disambiguation)
- Shaun Casey, American model
- Silas Casey (1807–1882), United States Army officer during the American Civil War
- Solanus Casey (1870–1957), Capuchin priest
- Sophie Casey (born 1991), Australian rules footballer
- Steve Casey (1909–1987), Irish wrestler
- Thomas Casey (disambiguation)
- Tom Casey (Australian politician) (1921–2003)
- Tom Casey (Canadian football) (1924–2002), player for the Winnipeg Blue Bombers
- Tom Casey (diplomat), American diplomat
- Tommy Casey (baseball) (fl. 1887), American baseball pitcher
- Tommy Casey (1930–2009), Northern Irish footballer
- Willet Casey (1762–1848), Canadian farmer and political figure
- William Casey (disambiguation)
- Willie Casey (born 1981), Irish professional boxer
- Willie Casey (Gaelic footballer) (1932–2016), Irish Gaelic footballer
- Zadok Casey (1796–1862), American politician

== Fictional characters ==
- the protagonist of Ben Casey, a medical drama television series
- Jared Casey, on the soap opera Passions
- John Casey (Chuck), in the television series Chuck
- Kevin Casey (Scrubs), on the medical comedy Scrubs played by Michael J. Fox
- Kevin Casey, a 2007 character from the Australian television soap opera Neighbours
- Michael "Iceman" Casey, in the Wing Commander franchise
- Michael Casey (Sons of Anarchy), fictional character
- Shane Casey, in the television series CSI: NY
- Detective Casey, a character in the Mickey Mouse universe

== See also ==
- Casey (given name)
- O'Casey, a surname
- alternative spelling: Cayce (disambiguation)
