= Gerard Casey =

Gerard Casey may refer to:

- Gerard Casey (artist), Irish artist
- Gerard Casey (philosopher) (born 1951), member of the School of Philosophy, University College Dublin
- Gerard Casey (Irish republican) (died 1989), member of the Provisional Irish Republican Army

== See also ==
- Casey (disambiguation)
- Gerard (disambiguation)
