= Kenneth Casey (disambiguation) =

Kenneth Casey (1899–1965) was an American composer and child actor.

Kenneth, Ken, or Kenny Casey may refer to:

- Ken Casey (born 1969), bass guitarist and frontman of Dropkick Murphys
- Kenneth J. Casey (died 2020), California real estate investor
- Kenneth L. Casey (born 1935), neurologist

== See also ==
- Ken Kesey (1935–2001), American author
- Casey (disambiguation)
