= General Casey =

General Casey may refer to:

- Aloysius G. Casey (1932–2020), U.S. Air Force lieutenant general
- George W. Casey Sr. (1922-1970), U.S. Army major general during Vietnam War
- George W. Casey Jr. (born 1948), U.S. Army Chief of Staff during Obama administration
- Hugh John Casey (1898-1981), U.S. Army major general during World War II
- Levi Casey (politician) (1752-1807), South Carolina militia brigadier general after the Revolutionary War
- Silas Casey (1807–1882), Union Army major general

== See also ==
- Casey's General Stores
- Casey (surname)
- Casey (given name)
- Casey (disambiguation)
