= Mike Casey =

Mike Casey may refer to:

- Mike Casey (labor leader) (born 1958), American labor leader from California
- Mike Casey (basketball) (1948–2009), American basketball player who played at the University of Kentucky
- Mike Casey (entrepreneur), New Zealand cherry orchardist and electrification advocate
- Mike Casey (hurler) (born 1995), Irish hurler

== See also ==
- Michael Casey (disambiguation)
