= Ron Carey =

Ron Carey may refer to:

- Ron Carey (actor) (1935–2007), American film and television actor who appeared in Barney Miller and in several films by Mel Brooks
- Ron Carey (labor leader) (1936–2008), former president of the Teamsters union
- Ron Carey (Minnesota politician), chairman of the Republican Party of Minnesota from 2005 to 2009
- Ronald Carey (rugby union) (born 1965), Irish rugby union player

== See also ==
- Rod Carey (born 1971), American football coach
- Ron Casey (disambiguation)
