= Infinity plus (disambiguation) =

"Infinity plus" may refer to:

- Infinity plus, a science-fiction webzine
- a 1996 album by Lois Maffeo
- a 1999 album by B! Machine
- a collection of games from the Infinity video game series
- the mathematical concept of infinity plus one
