= Divya Dhar =

New Zealand doctor and business woman

- Occupation: Doctor
- Website: http://divyadhar.com/

Divya Dhar is a medical doctor from New Zealand. In 2010 she received the Young New Zealander of the Year Award.

== Biography ==
Dhar holds a bachelor of medicine and bachelor of surgery from the University of Auckland. On entering medical school, Dhar founded HealtheX, a research group bringing together 250 presenters and participants to showcase their research on health and develop student and faculty camaraderie. In 2007, she was instrumental in sending the first New Zealand delegation to the International Federation of Medical Students’ Association, the only student organisation represented in the United Nations. Dhar gave a presentation on climate change at the event and through her efforts New Zealand Medical Students' Association was the first New Zealand organisation to join the Climate and Health Council Coalition, seeking to put pressure on government leaders.

Divya became involved with the United Nations Youth Aotearoa New Zealand (UN Youth) at a young age and went on to become its first National Conference Director and Auckland Vice President. She served as Vice President of the New Zealand Medical Students' Association (NZMSA). A policy Divya wrote for NZMSA to combat the problem of doctor drain has been adopted by the government, enabling young doctors to be reimbursed up to $50,000 if they work in an area of need. Divya created a precedent for forming alliances between medical students and wider humanitarian organisations such as the Global Poverty Project where she was a key leader.

She organised OXFAM’s Biggest Coffee Break at the University of Auckland to promote Fair Trade, where she was also behind the STAND UP: UN Millennium Campaignworking to eradicate extreme poverty. During her medical elective, she built houses for Costa Rica’s poorest in a flood-ridden region and raised over $20,000 for the Accor Cure Kids Charity Race.

Dhar also completed a Masters in Business Administration at the Wharton Business School in 2014, part of a dual degree program in which she also earned a Master of Public Administration from Harvard’s Kennedy School.

Dhar led a group of her friends to set up the P3 Foundation with a vision to mobilise young people to break the poverty cycle. P3 stands for Peace, Prosperity and Progress and aims to educate, encourage action and advocacy. The P3 Foundation works on absolute poverty in the Asia Pacific region. Dhar is the co-founder and CEO of Seratis, a start-up in the area of healthcare information technology.

=== Awards ===
She was awarded the inaugural Young New Zealander of the Year Award in 2010 and inaugural Indian New Zealander of the Year Award 2011. In 2016 she was named The University of Auckland Young Alumna of the Year.
