= Sean Casey =

Sean Casey may refer to:

- Sean Casey (baseball) (born 1974), baseball player
- Sean Casey (Canadian politician) (born 1963), Canadian politician
- Sean Casey (filmmaker) (born 1967), filmmaker and storm chaser
- Seán Casey (1922–1967), an Irish politician
- Sean Casey (rower) (born 1978), Irish Olympic rower
- Sean Casey (rugby league), rugby league footballer
- Sean Casey (wrestler) (born 1972), American professional wrestler
- Sean Casey, a fictional character from the 1997 motion picture Night Falls on Manhattan
- Shaun Casey (1954–2024), model
- Shaun Casey, former head of the U.S. State Department's Office of Religion and Global Affairs

== See also ==
- Sean Carey (disambiguation)
- Seán O'Casey (1880–1964), Irish writer
- Casey (surname)
