= John Casey =

John Casey may refer to:

- John Casey (academic) (born 1939), British academic and writer for The Daily Telegraph
- John Casey (Chuck), fictional character portrayed by Adam Baldwin on the television show Chuck
- John Casey (commentator) (born 1964), Australian journalist and sports broadcaster
- John Casey (footballer) (fl. 1935–1941), Dumbarton FC player
- John Casey (mathematician) (1820–1891), Irish geometer
- John Casey (politician) (1823–1893), Newfoundland politician
- John Casey (novelist) (1939–2025), American novelist and translator
- John Casey (rugby league), rugby league footballer of the 1920s and 1930s
- John J. Casey (1875–1929), Democratic member of the U.S. House of Representatives from Pennsylvania
- John Casey (climate change author), American author
- John Casey (Australian convict) (died 1882), Irish rebel transported to Australia in 1826
- John Keegan Casey (1846–1870), Irish poet, orator and republican
- John Sears Casey (1930–2022), member of the Alabama House of Representatives
- Captain John C. Casey (1809–1856), who gave his name to Fort Casey in Florida
- Jack Casey (John Casey, 1935–2019), member of the New Jersey General Assembly

== See also ==
- Jon Casey (born 1962), retired American ice hockey goaltender
- John Kasay (born 1969), National Football League placekicker
- Seán O'Casey (1880–1964), Irish dramatist born John Casey
- Casey (disambiguation)
- John (disambiguation)
