= Deborah Manning =

New Zealand lawyer and food waste reduction advocate

Deborah Manning ONZM
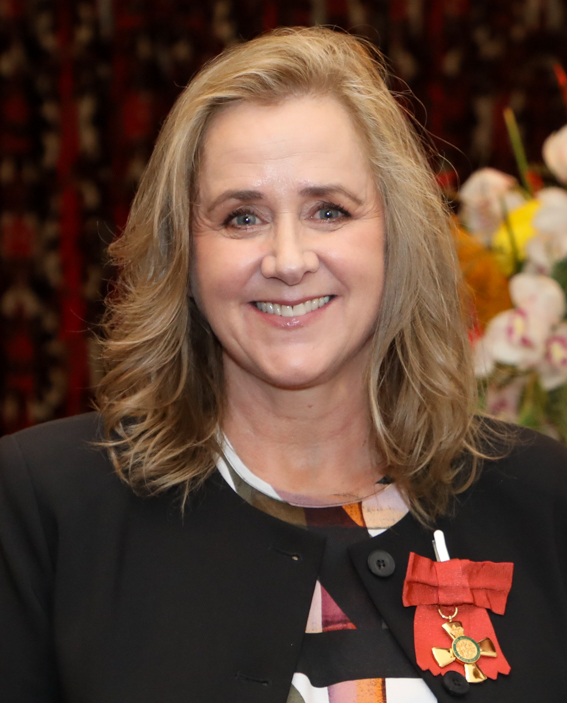
- Manning in 2025
- Born: London, England
- Awards: Sustainability Leader of the Year (2025)

Academic background
- Education: University of Otago; Otago Polytechnic

Deborah Ann Manning ONZM is a New Zealand lawyer and charity founder. Manning founded food sharing charity KiwiHarvest, and a sister charity the New Zealand Food Network to redistribute food more efficiently and reduce environmental pollution from food waste. In 2024, Manning was appointed an Officer of the New Zealand Order of Merit, for services to the community and the environment.

== Early life and education ==
Manning was born in London where her father was studying medicine. The family returned to New Zealand when Manning was three, and settled in Palmerston North. Manning attended Ngā Tawa boarding school in Marton. Manning is a qualified physiotherapist and lawyer, having studied physiotherapy at Otago Polytechnic and completed her Bachelor of Laws at the University of Otago in Dunedin.

== Career ==
Manning worked a physiotherapist and then as a lawyer and lecturer, before founding a food sharing organisation (initially named FoodShare and now called KiwiHarvest) in 2012. She had read newspaper articles about people gathering food from dumpsters, alongside articles about child poverty and food insecurity. KiwiHarvest collects and redistributes food that can't be sold for reasons such as damaged packaging, cancelled orders, mislabelling or short-dated. Manning initially worked in Dunedin, using her own car to collect unwanted food and redistribute it through social service agencies and food banks. By 2024, KiwiHarvest was operating five branches nationally, and had delivered 12 million kilograms of food to more than 220 charitable organisations. Manning's brother, former All Black David Kirk, chairs the board of KiwiHarvest.

In 2020 Manning founded the New Zealand Food Network. The network created a national food distribution network with more than 65 hubs, and is aimed at creating a more efficient redistribution system for large volumes of food. The network provides food assistance to more than 650,000 people each month.

Manning is a panel member of organisation New Zealand Food Waste Champions 12.3, which provides education, advocacy and strategy about food rescue, towards the Sustainable Development Goal 12.3 of halving New Zealand's food waste by 2030.

== Honours and awards ==
In 2022 Manning was named Sustainability Superstar at the Sustainable Business Network’s Sustainable Business Awards. She has been named as a Distinguished Alumni of Otago Polytechnic, and was one of the 2023 Top 50 Women in Food & Drink in Aotearoa New Zealand. In 2022 KiwiHarvest jointly won the not-for-profit category at The Grand Business South Awards. Manning was a finalist in the Community Hero section of the Women of Influence Awards in 2020, and a semi-finalist in the 2022 Kiwibank New Zealand Local Hero of the Year awards.

In the 2024 King's Birthday Honours, Manning was appointed an Officer of the New Zealand Order of Merit for services to the community and the environment.

In 2025 Manning was named the Sustainability Leader of the Year in the New Zealander of the Year Awards.
