= Hispanics and Latinos in Nevada =

Hispanic and Latino Nevadans are residents of the state of Nevada who are of Hispanic or Latino ancestry. As of the 2020 U.S. Census, Hispanics and Latinos of any race were 28.3% of the state's population.

== History ==
Francisco Garcés was the first European in the area. He explored the present-day Nevada in the 1770s. Nevada was annexed as a part of the Spanish Empire in the northwestern territory of New Spain. As part of Las Californias, the area of Nevada belonged to the Commandancy General of the Provincias Internas in the Viceroyalty of New Spain. However, no Hispanics migrated to Nevada. Nevada became a part of Alta California (Upper California) province in 1804 when the Californias were split. With the Mexican War of Independence won in 1821, the province of Alta California became a territory—not a state—of Mexico, due to the small population. As when Nevada was Spanish, the territory remained unattractive to Mexicans, and no Mexicans settled there.

Rafael Rivera was the first non-Native American to encounter the modern-day Las Vegas Valley, in 1829, while Antonio Armijo traveled along the Spanish Trail to Los Angeles, California in 1829. He led a troop of 60 men. As a result of the Mexican–American War and the Treaty of Guadalupe Hidalgo, Mexico permanently lost Alta California in 1848. Unlike present-day California, Arizona, New Mexico and Texas, Nevada had no Hispanic population when it joined the US. The new areas acquired by the United States continued to be administered as territories. As part of the Mexican Cession (1848) and the subsequent California Gold Rush that used Emigrant Trails through the area, the state's area evolved first as part of the Utah Territory, then the Nevada Territory (March 2, 1861; named for the Sierra Nevada). Since its incorporation into the US, Nevada has absorbed a lot of Hispanic migration, mainly from Mexico. In fact, all Hispanics who migrated to Nevada until 1960 were of Mexican origin. From 1960, many Cubans fleeing the Castro regime and many East Coast Hispanics, mainly of Puerto Rican origin, have migrated to Nevada. Many of the first Cuban newcomers had worked at Cuba's casinos and migrated to Las Vegas to continue working in that profession. Subsequently, Hispanics from other countries also migrated to Nevada, although most of the immigrants remained Mexicans, who migrated to improve their social conditions and provide better education for their children. Between 1990 and 2010 the growth of the Hispanic population accelerated. Thereafter, growth slowed down.

== Demographics ==
Hispanics of any race made 26.5% of the population. In 1970, non-Hispanic whites made up 88% of the state's population.

The principal ancestry of Nevada's residents in 2009 has been surveyed to be the following:

- 20.8% Mexican

Nevada also has a sizable Basque ancestry population. In Douglas, Mineral and Pershing counties, a plurality of residents are of Mexican ancestry, with Clark County (Las Vegas) alone being home to over 200,000 Mexican Americans. Las Vegas is home to rapid-growing ethnic communities, including Spaniards. According to the 2000 US Census, 16.19% of Nevada's population aged 5 and older speak Spanish at home. Las Vegas was a major destination for immigrants from Hispanic America seeking employment in the gaming and hospitality industries during the 1990s and first decade of the 21st century, but farming and construction are the biggest employers of immigrant labor.

According to the 2010 census, Hispanics are majority in Jackpot (55.6%) and West Wendover (61.7%), and are the main (though not the majority) ethnic or racial group in Sunrise Manor (48.5%) and Winchester (44.6%).

=== Hispanic ancestries ===
(self-identified ethnicity, not by birthplace)
Ancestry by origin (2019 surveys)	Population	%
Argentine	3,564	
Bolivian	1,125	
Chilean	2,222	
Colombian	6,526	
Costa Rican	2,974	
Cuban	36,041	
Dominican	5,234	
Ecuadorian	1,291	
Guatemalan	23,410	
Honduran	4,634	
Mexican	677,268	
Nicaraguan	5,038	
Panamanian	1,353	
Paraguayan	68	
Peruvian	10,159	
Puerto Rican	30,968	
Salvadoran	40,576	
"Spanish"	7,892	
"Spaniard"	12,227	
"Spanish American"	316	
Uruguayan	516	
Venezuelan	4,661	
All other	20,808	
Total	900,599	

Ancestry by region	Number (2010 Census)	%
Mexican	540,978	20.0%
Caribbean	44,569	1.7%
Central America	55,937	2.1%
South America	19,056	0.7%
Other Hispanic	55,961	2.1%
Total		

== Historic Hispanic/Latino population (1900-2020) ==
Nevada	Number of people of Mexican Origin (1900–1930) and of Hispanic/Latino Origin (1940–2020) in Nevada^{[a]}	+% of Population of Mexican Origin (1900–1930) and of Hispanic/Latino Origin (1940–2020) in Nevada
1900	N/A	N/A
1910	900	1.1%
1920	1,393	1.8%
1930	3,369	3.7%
1940	3,046	2.8%
1950	N/A	N/A
1960	11,411	4%
1970	27,142 (15% sample)	5.6%
1980	53,879	6.7%
1990	124,419	10.4%
2000	393,970	19.7%
2010	716,501	26.5%
2020	890,257	28.7%

== Politics ==
Hispanics and Latinos in Nevada remains a strongly Democratic constituency, as the party habitually wins the Latino vote nationally. In 2020, Democratic nominee Joe Biden carried 61% of Latinos in Nevada, according to exit polls by Eddison Research, while Republican Donald Trump won 35%.
