= New Zealander of the Year Awards =

Set of annual awards in New Zealand

The New Zealander of the Year Awards, currently known as the Kiwibank New Zealander of the Year Awards, celebrate the achievements of New Zealanders and were founded in 2010 by Australian Jeffrey John Hopp. Nominations are accepted from the general public and a judging panel selects finalists in each category. The awards are presented in Auckland in March each year.

== Categories ==
The categories for the awards are:

- Kiwibank New Zealander of the Year (Te Pou Whakarae o Aotearoa)
- University of Canterbury Young New Zealander of the Year (Te Mātātahi o te Tau)
- Ryman Healthcare Senior New Zealander of the Year (Te Mātāpuputu o te Tau)
- Kiwibank New Zealand Local Hero of the Year (Te Pou Toko o te Tau)
- Mitre 10 New Zealand Community of the Year (Ngā Pou Whirinaki o te Tau)
- Spark New Zealand Innovator of the Year (Te Pou Whakairo o te Tau)
- Genesis New Zealand Sustainability Leader of the Year (Te Toa Taiao o te Tau)
- New Zealand Legacy Award (Te Pou Tūroa o Aotearoa)

=== New Zealander of the Year ===
Year	Recipient	Portrait
2010	Ray Avery	
2011	Paul Callaghan	
2012	Richard Taylor	
2013	Anne Salmond	
2014	Lance O'Sullivan	
2015	Stephen Tindall	
2016	Richie McCaw	
2017	Taika Waititi	
2018	Kristine Bartlett	
2019	Mike King	
2020	Jennifer Ward-Lealand	
2021	Siouxsie Wiles	
2022	Tipene O'Regan	
2023	Rangi Mātāmua	
2024	Jim Salinger	
2025	Bev Lawton	
2026	No winner (Note: Sir Rod Drury returned the 2026 award after being publicly accused of sexual misconduct by three former employees.)	

=== Young New Zealander of the Year ===
Nominees must be aged between 15 and 30 years of age.

Year	Recipient	Portrait
2010	Divya Dhar	
2011	Jamie Fenton	
2012	Sam Johnson	
2013	Sam Judd	
2014	Parris Goebel	
2015	Guy Ryan	
2016	Lydia Ko	
2017	Rez Gardi	
2018	David Cameron	
2019	Kendall Flutey	
2020	Georgia Hale	
2021	Jazz Thornton	
2022	Ezra Hirawani	
2023	Shaneel Lal	
2024	Simran Kaur	
2025	Nu'uali'i Eteroa Lafaele	
2026	Lucy Blakiston	

=== Senior New Zealander of the Year ===
Nominees must be over 70 years old.

Year	Recipient	Portrait
2010	Eion Edgar	
2011	Alison Neill	
2012	Malcolm Cameron	
2013	Ian Grant	
2014	Frances Denz	
2015	Donald Sew Hoy	
2016	John Russell	
2017	Sue Paterson	
2018	Kim Workman	
2019	Bill Glass	
2020	Margaret Sparrow	
2021	Doug Wilson	
2022	Tipene O'Regan	
2023	Mark Dunajtschik	
2024	Bob Francis	
2025	Elizabeth Ellis	
2026	Alan and Hazel Kerr	

=== Local Hero of the Year ===
The award is made to an individual who is making or has made a significant contribution to their local community.

Year	Recipient	Portrait
2010	Sam Chapman	
2011	Billy Graham	
2012	Henare O'Keefe	
2013	Jim Morunga	
2014	Cecilia Sullivan-Grant	
2015	Billie Jordan	
2016	Selwyn Cook	
2017	Hayden Smith	
2018	Ricky Houghton	
2019	Pera Barrett	
2020	Nick Loosley	
2021	Shannon Te Huia	
2022	David Letele	
2023	Ellen Nelson	
2024	Sally Walker	
2025	Subash Chandar K	
2026	Māhera Maihi	

=== Community of the Year ===
Regional or national community groups, iwi, geographical regions or collectives of people in any sector are eligible for the award.

Year	Recipient
2010	Victory Village, Nelson
2011	Gibbston Community Association
2012	Paeroa
2013	Grandparents Raising Grandchildren Trust NZ
2014	Victim Support
2015	Paihia
2016	Community Fruit Harvesting
2017	Randwick Park
2018	Canterbury Charity Hospital Trust
2019	Pillars
2020	Good Bitches Baking
2021	Christchurch Mosque Victims Group
2022	Matakaoa
2023	Kindness Collective
2024	Cyclone Gabrielle volunteers
2025	Lake Alice survivors
2026	Safeguarding Children Initiative

=== Innovator of the Year ===
The category was introduced in 2014.

Year	Recipient	Portrait
2014	Sean Simpson	
2015	Peter Beck	
2016	Hyvan Anaesthesia Ltd	
2017	Ed Gane	
2018	Team New Zealand design team	
2019	Ian Taylor	
2020	Bill Buckley	
2021	Ranjna Patel	
2022	Mark Sagar	
2023	Emily Blythe	
2024	Cecilia Robinson	
2025	Emma Lewisham	
2026	Craig Piggott	

=== Sustainability Leader of the Year ===
The category was introduced in 2022, and was known as Environmental Hero of the year from 2022 to 2024.

Year	Recipient	Portrait
2022	Charmaine Bailie	
2023	Camden Howitt	
2024	Nicola MacDonald	
2025	Deborah Manning	
2026	Mike Casey	

=== Legacy Award ===
The Legacy Award was inaugurated in 2024, and recognises an individual or individuals whose contribution to New Zealand over a sustained period of time has played a significant role in defining national identity.

Year	Recipient	Portrait
2024	Wayne Smith	
2025	Mark Dunajtschik and Dorothy Spotswood	
2026	Lynley Dodd	

== Nomination and selection process ==
Any member of the public can nominate an individual (aged 15 years or older), organisation or group for an award. A judging panel of one executive judge and two or three additional judges creates a list of semi-finalists, followed by a shortlist of three finalists for each award. The finalists are invited to the New Zealander of the Year Awards Gala in Auckland and the winners are announced on the night. Local Hero Medal recipients are awarded throughout December each year.

All nominees receive a certificate of achievement, and each of the six category award winners receives a trophy and a prize of NZ$5,000.

In 2020, the executive judges were:

- Tess Casey, CEO, Neighbourhood Support NZ
- Bill Dwyer, Commercial and Corporate Lawyer
- Jamie Fitzgerald, CEO, Inspiring Performance
- Marisa Fong, Trustee, Simplicity NZ; Director, Masimaya Consulting, Founder/Director, Arné Skincare
- Abby Foote, Professional Director
- Steve Jurkovich, CEO, Kiwibank
- Miriama Kamo, Te Koruru, Patron
- Bill Moran, Professional Director, Chair, Sport New Zealand
- Mere Pohatu, Regional Director, Ministry of Maori Development
- Caren Rangi, ONZM, Deputy Chair of Creative New Zealand
- Lou Sanson, Director-General of the Department of Conservation
