= Equestrian statue of Rafael Rivera =

Statue in Las Vegas, Nevada, U.S.

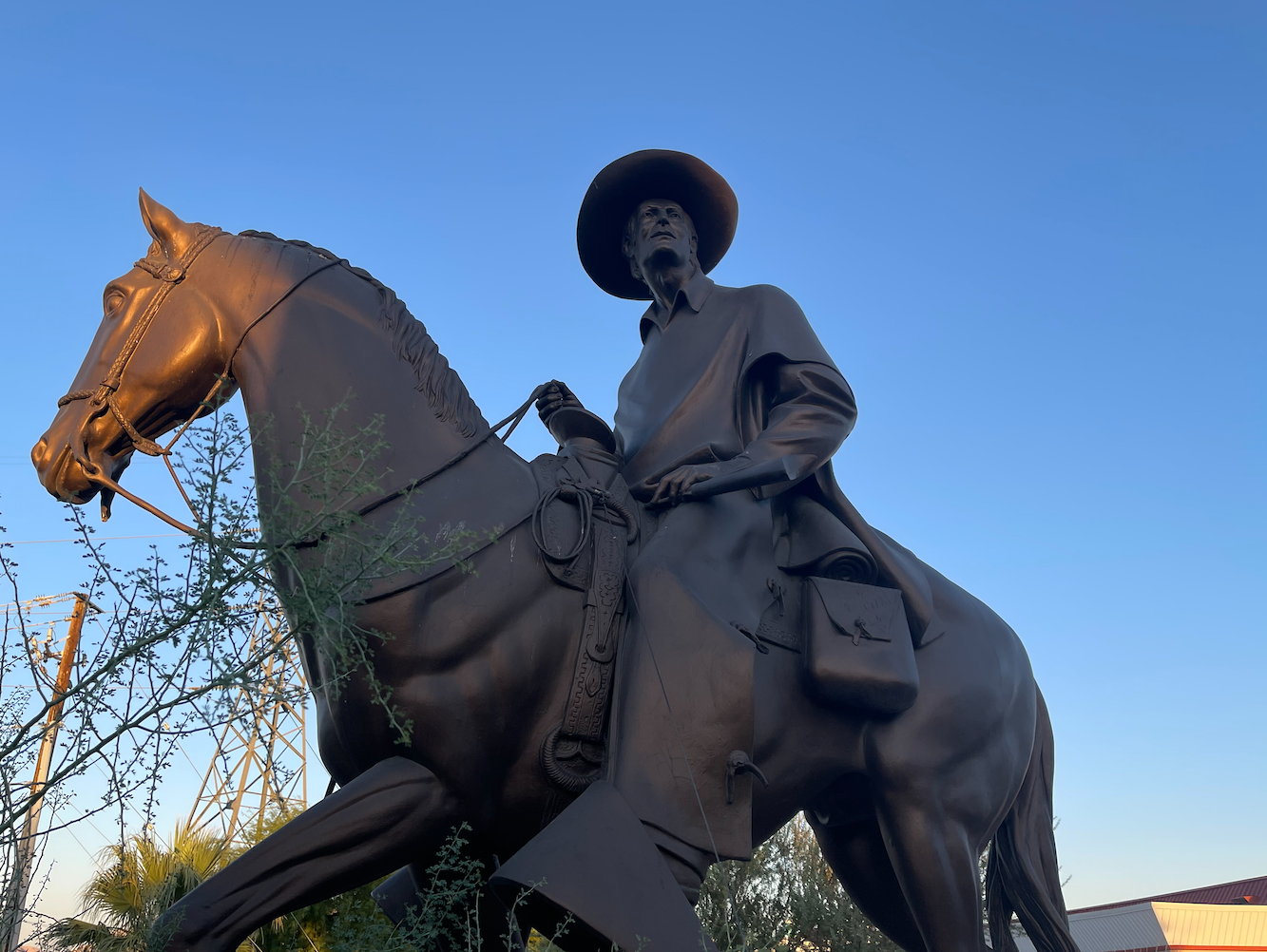
- Artist: Jim Casey
- Completion date: 1978
- Medium: fiberglass sculpture with bronze paint
- Subject: Rafael Rivera
- Location: Las Vegas, Nevada, United States

The equestrian statue of Rafael Rivera is a public art sculpture in Las Vegas, Nevada. It honors Rafael Rivera, a Mexican scout and the first non-native to explore the Las Vegas Valley, in 1829. The 11 feet (3.4 m) tall fiberglass statue was created by artist Jim Casey, and erected in 1978 along Boulder Highway, to advertise a theme park called Old Vegas in Henderson, Nevada.

It was later relocated by the City of Las Vegas to the Rafael Rivera Park in Las Vegas.

== See also ==
- List of equestrian statues
- List of equestrian statues in the United States
