= Thomas Casey =

Thomas Casey may refer to:

- Thomas Casey (Kilmallock MP) (1765–1840), Irish politician
- Thomas Lincoln Casey Sr. (1831–1896), United States Army Corps of Engineers
- Thomas Lincoln Casey Jr. (1857–1925), American expert in coleoptera and son of Thomas Lincoln Casey Sr.
- Thomas S. Casey (1832–1891), American judge and politician
- Thomas Worrall Casey (1869–1949), British Liberal Member of Parliament
- Tommy Casey (baseball), 19th-century American baseball pitcher
- Tom Casey (Australian politician) (1921–2003), South Australian MHA and MLC
- Tom Casey (Canadian football) (1924–2002), Canadian football player for Winnipeg Blue Bombers
- Tommy Casey (1930–2009), Northern Irish footballer
- Tom Casey (diplomat), American diplomat
