= Samuel Casey =

Samuel Casey may refer to:

- Samuel Casey (silversmith) (1723/4–1773), silversmith from Rhode Island
- Samuel Casey (Upper Canada politician) (1788–1857), political figure in Upper Canada
- Samuel L. Casey (1821–1902), U.S. Representative from Kentucky
- Samuel K. Casey (1817–1871), American politician
- Samuel B. Casey Jr. (1927–2006), president of Pullman Company
