= Infinity plus one =

In mathematics, infinity plus one is a concept which has a well-defined formal meaning in some number systems, and may refer to:

- Transfinite numbers, numbers that are larger than all the finite numbers.
  - Cardinal numbers, representations of sizes (cardinalities) of abstract sets, which may be infinite.
  - Ordinal numbers, representations of order types of well-ordered sets, which may also be infinite.
- Hyperreal numbers, an extension of the real number system that contains infinite and infinitesimal numbers.
- Surreal numbers, another extension of the real numbers, contain the hyperreal and all the transfinite ordinal numbers.

== See also ==
- infinityplusone, New Zealand maths teacher and YouTuber
