= William Case (disambiguation) =

William Case (1818–1862) was an American politician.

William Case or Bill Case may also refer to:

- William Case (cricketer) (1873–1922), English cricketer
- W. R. Case & Sons Cutlery Co., an American manufacturer
- William S. Case (1863–1921), associate justice of the Connecticut Supreme Court
- William Case, a character in Blackhawk (serial)
- William Case, of the 1784 Dutch corvette Scipio
- Bill Case (Oklahoma politician) (born 1954), an American politician from Oklahoma

== See also ==
- William Casey (disambiguation)
