= O'Casey =

Origin
- Languages: Old Irish (Anglicized)
- Meaning: descendant of Cathasach (vigilant or watchful)
- Region of origin: Ireland

Other names
- Variant forms: O'Cathasaigh; Casey (disambiguation); MacCasey

O'Casey is a common variation of the Gaelic cathasaigh, meaning vigilant or watchful, with the added anglicized prefix O' of the Gaelic Ó, meaning grandson or descendant. At least six different septs used this name, primarily in the Counties of Cork and Dublin.

According to historian C. Thomas Cairney, the O'Caseys were the chiefly family of the Saithne tribe who in turn were from the Dumnonii or Laigin who were the third wave of Celts to settle in Ireland during the first century BC.

People with the surname O'Casey include:

- Seán O'Casey (1880–1964), Irish playwright
- Eileen O'Casey (1900–1995), Irish actress, author, and wife of Sean O'Casey
- Breon O'Casey (1928–2011), son of Seán and Eileen O'Casey
- Lance O'Casey, cartoon character
- Ronan O'Casey (1922–2012), Canadian actor and producer
- O'Casey (O'Cathasaigh), chief of Saithne, now Sonagh, in Westmeath; see Tuite Baronets

== See also ==
- Casey (surname)
- Casey (disambiguation)
- Irish clans
