= Jeffrey Hopp =

Australian businessman, entrepreneur & philanthropist

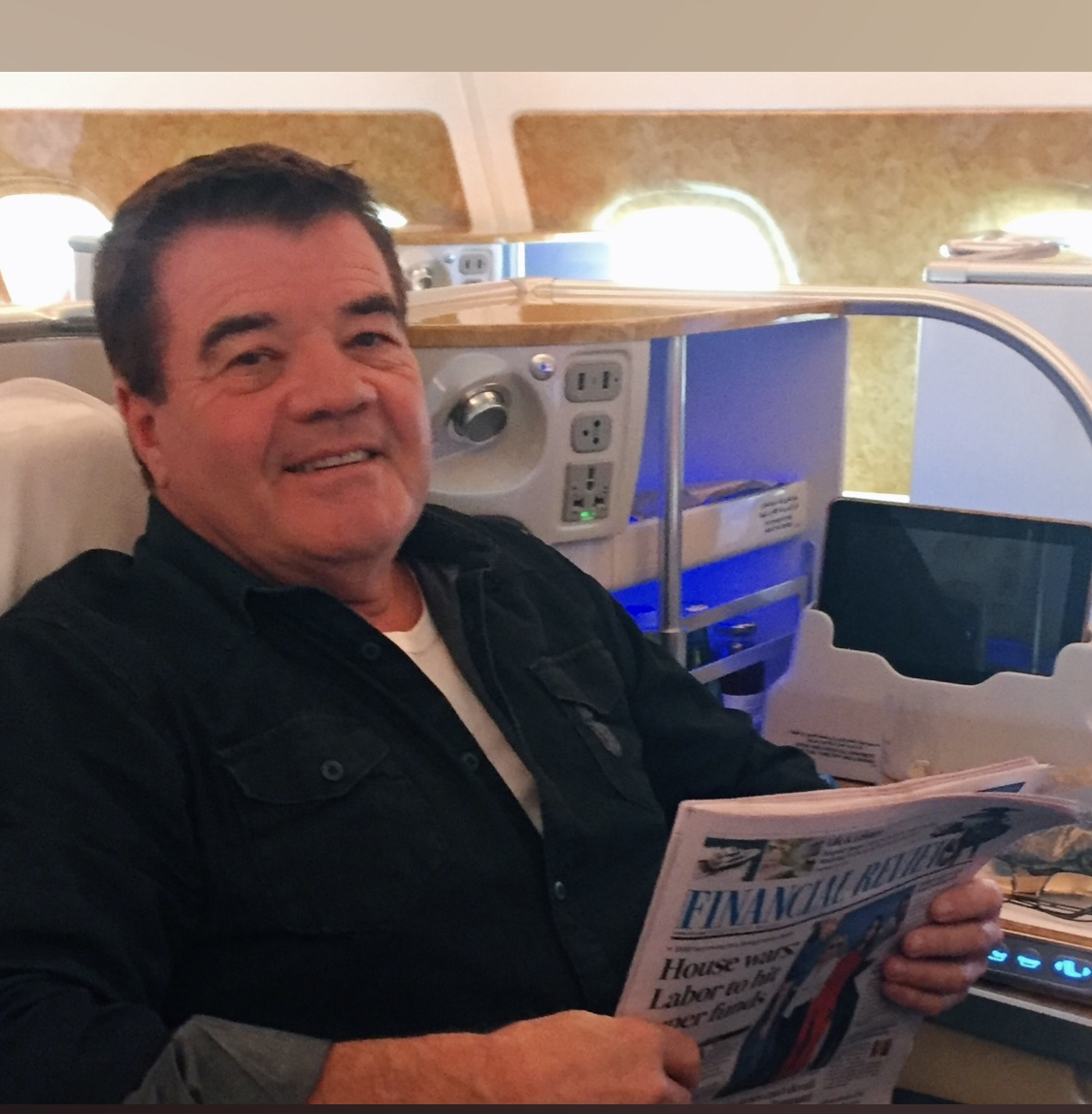
MR Jeffrey J Hopp

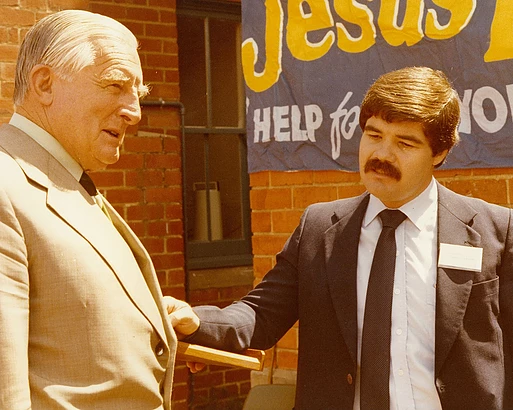
Hopp opens one of the youth refuge centres with then Premier Sir Charles Court (circa 1982)

Jeffrey John Hopp is an Australian businessman, entrepreneur and philanthropist. He was the founder and chairman from 1974 to 1988 of Jesus People Welfare Services Inc, Perth, Western Australia, now known as Perth City Mission. After leaving Jesus People Welfare Services Inc, he started his own company Awards Australia, which runs Community Awards Programs Nationally and in New Zealand, including The Young Australian of the Year Awards and The New Zealander of the Year Awards. He also Started School Fun Run, which raises money for Schools in Australia and New Zealand.

== Early life ==
Hopp was born in Brisbane, Queensland, to Mervyn and Marjorie Jeffries. Hopp was educated in the Catholic school system in St Joachim's Primary School, Holland Park and Cavendish Road State High School. He enlisted in the Royal Australian Air Force in 1964 and settled in Perth Western Australia in 1968.

== Career ==
After leaving home to join the Royal Australian Air Force, Hopp received a discharge of 'Services No Longer Required' to pursue a career as a musician and drummer in pop band, Richard and the Lionhearts in the Riverina district.

In 1974 Hopp founded Jesus People Inc (now known as Perth City Mission) to provide services and accommodation for homeless youth. From a humble beginning in his garage, the organisation expanded to become the largest youth welfare service in Western Australia helping up to 3000 young people every year. Hopp spent a month working with a brother organisation, Jesus People Inc. in Chicago working with homeless youth, drug addicts and young women in crisis.

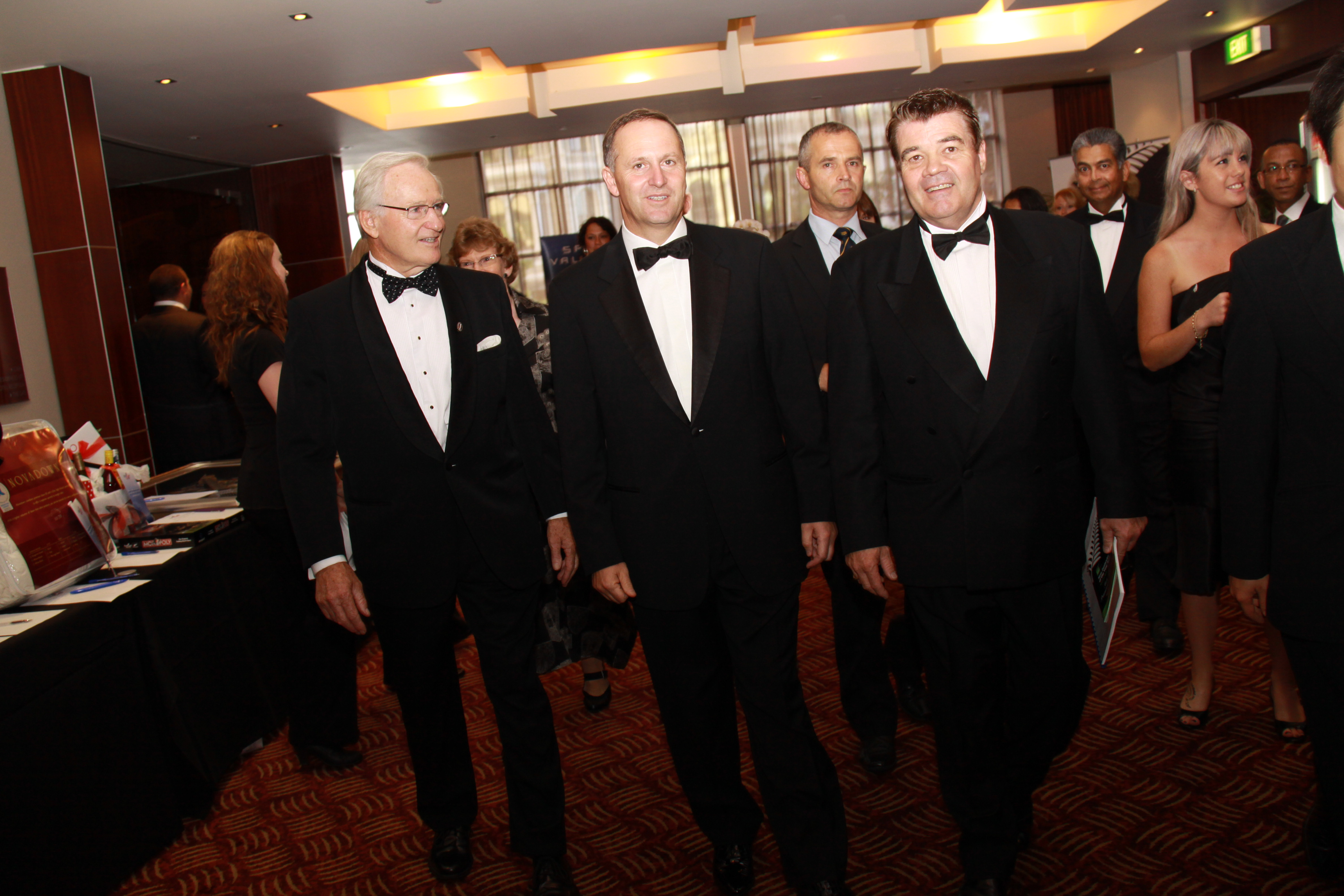
Jeffrey Hopp with Former New Zealand Prime Minister John Key at the 2010 New Zealander of the Year Awards

The largest source of fundraising for the charity came from concert tours and musical productions with big-name artists such as Cliff Richard, Amy Grant, Pat Boone, B. J. Thomas, Dion DiMucci, Barry McGuire and Paul Stookey from Peter, Paul and Mary. Hopp also was a producer of several local gospel musical productions such as Come Together, If My People and The Witness and produced Christmas at the Centre, a regular musical spectacular televised by Channel 7 Perth featuring such artists as Colleen Hewitt and Jon English.

In 1989 after resigning as chairman and CEO of Jesus People Inc., Hopp created Awards Australia to recognise excellence across a series of awards programs including Young Australian of the Year Awards, the State Regional Achievement Awards, the Aged Care Awards for the Federal Government and through an invitation by the then Chairman of the National Australia Day Council, Phillip Adams, Hopp took over the running of the Young Australian of the Year Awards. He also added the Senior Australian of the Year Awards to the program. In 2010 he founded the New Zealander of the Year Awards Program. Awards Australia was sold in 2014.

== Personal life ==
Jeffrey Hopp has been married twice, First to Margaret Covey(1972-1989), and has two children from the first marriage,Cristy(Born 1974) and Brendan(Born 1978), then to Vanessa Pollock(2008-2016), they had no children.

Currently, Jeffrey is retired and living on the Gold Coast, where he has chosen to retire.

== Other activities ==
Hopp was also the founder of The Fundraising Group Pty Ltd in Australia and School Fundraising Group Limited. The Australian company was established in 1989 and the New Zealand company in 2011 helping schools in both countries raise funds to improve their facilities. Hopp is fully retired from this business and no longer has any association with the present company. Hopp has received many awards and acknowledgment for his charity and community work.

== Recognition ==
- Winston Churchill Memorial Fellowship in 1983.
- WA Citizen of the Year Award in 1981.
