= Dorothy Spotswood =

New Zealand philanthropist

Dame Dorothy Spotswood DNZM
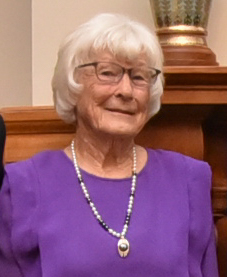
- Spotswood in 2021
- Born: 1937 or 1938 (age 88–89)
- Citizenship: New Zealand
- Known for: philanthropy
- Spouse: Mark Dunajtschik

Dame Dorothy Myrtle Spotswood DNZM (born 1937 or 1938) is a New Zealand philanthropist, donating to health and disability causes over a more than fifty-year period. In December 2025, she was appointed a Dame Companion of the New Zealand Order of Merit, for services to philanthropy.

== Biography ==
Spotswood was born in 1937 or 1938. She has been a philanthropist, donating to health and disability causes over a more than fifty-year period. Spotswood and her life and business partner, Sir Mark Dunajtschik, donated $53 million towards the building of Te Wao Nui (Wellington Children's Hospital). Dunajtschik and Spotswood were actively involved in the Children's Hospital project, and Spotswood even watered the first concrete poured for the base of the building after they noticed on a late-night visit that it had not yet been done. Spotswood donated $10 million for the fitout of the Dorothy Spotswood Charity Hospital in Wellington. Spotswood purchased land and funded the building of houses in Kāpiti for people with intellectual disabilities, where the Dorothy Spotswood Village is named after her, working with the Hōhepa Trust. Spotswood and Dunajtschik together funded further residential care facilities in Kapiti through charity L’Arche Kāpiti. In 1975, the couple also helped found Life Flight, a Wellington-based helicopter rescue service operating across the lower North Island and upper South Island, which led to the later establishment of the Westpac Helicopter Rescue Service. Through the Nikau Foundation, Spotswood and Dunajtschik have a provided for a 'significant' legacy donation.

== Honours and awards ==
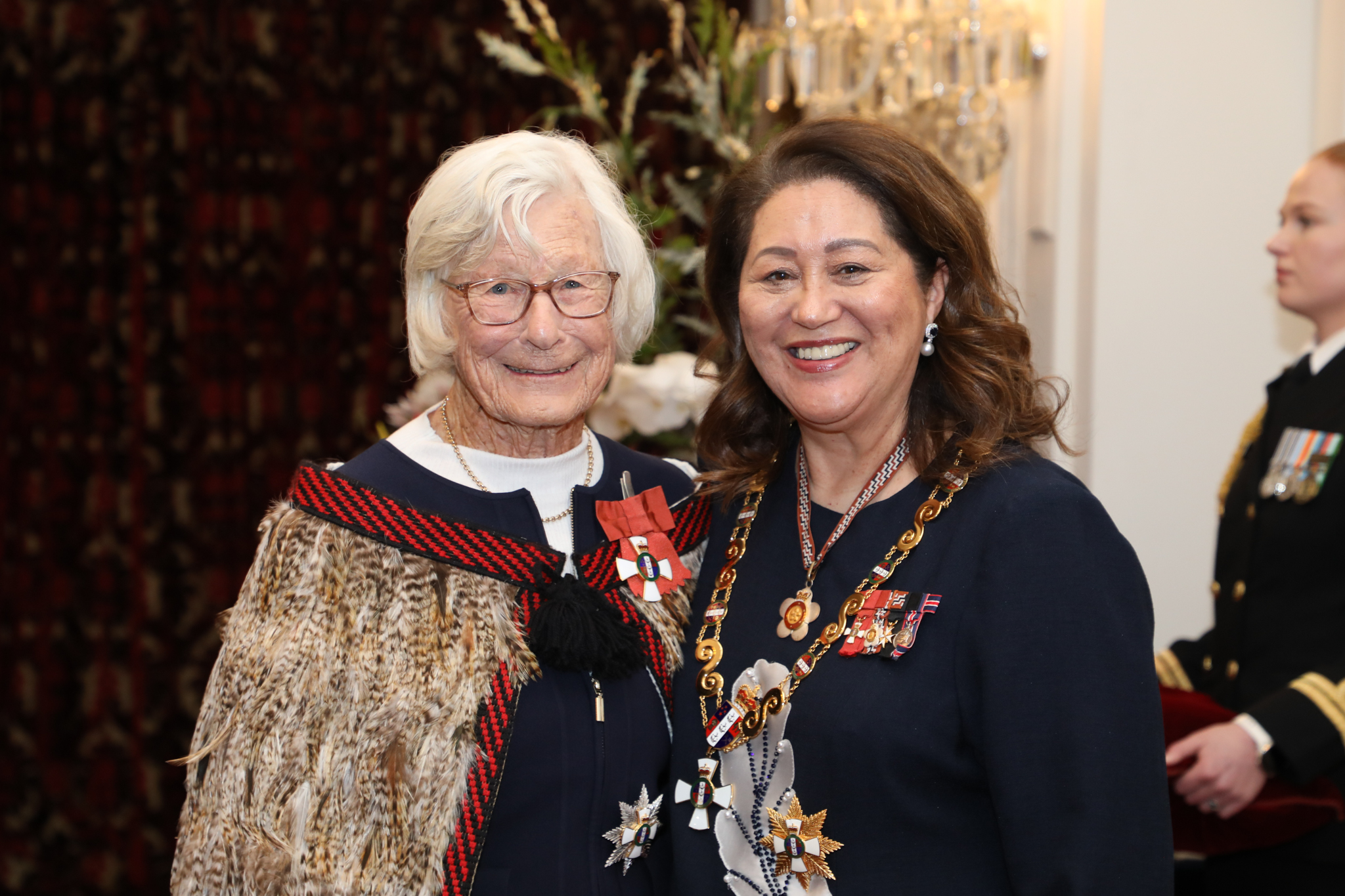
Spotswood (left), after her investiture as a Dame Companion of the New Zealand Order of Merit by the governor-general, Cindy Kiro, at Government House, Wellington, on 21 May 2026

Spotswood and Dunajtschik were awarded the New Zealand Legacy Award at the 2025 Kiwibank New Zealander of the Year Awards. In the 2026 New Year Honours, Spotswood was appointed a Dame Companion of the New Zealand Order of Merit, for services to philanthropy.

== Personal life ==
Spotswood met her life and business partner Dunajtschik at the Overland travel club in Wellington, which he had founded. The couple have no children.
