= Rez Gardi =

New Zealand lawyer

Rez Gardi MNZM
- ڕێژین گەردی
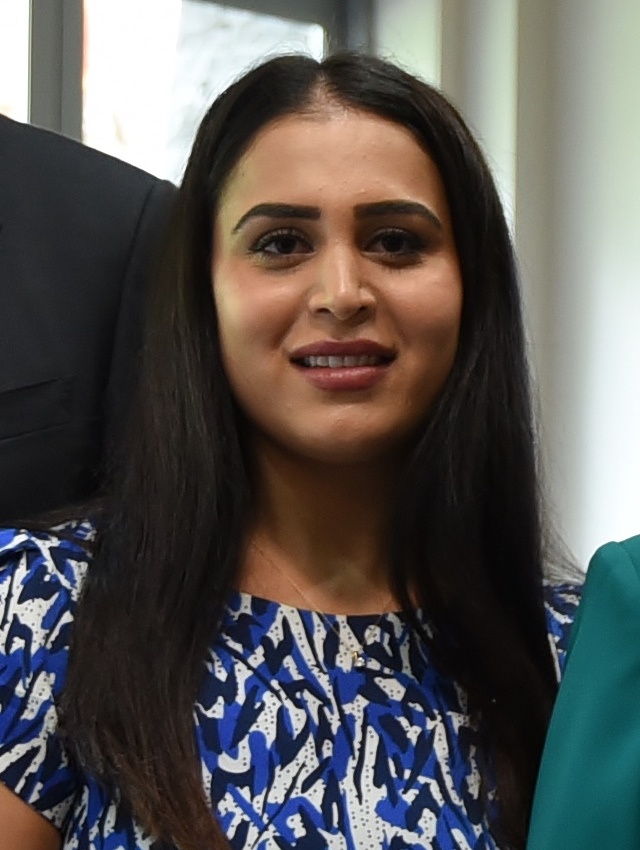
- Gardi in 2018
- Born: Rêz Gerdî; Quetta, Balochistan, Pakistan
- Education: Harvard University
- Occupations: International lawyer, human rights lawyer
- Years active: 2016–present
- Known for: Human rights advocacy
- Awards: New Zealand Order of MeritYoung New Zealander of the Year Award (2017); UNYA Outstanding Youth Delegate Award (2019); Harvard Satter Human Rights Fellowship (2019)

Rez Gardi MNZM (Kurdish: ڕێژین گەردی, Rêz Gerdî; 1991) is New Zealand's first Kurdish lawyer and human rights lawyer. She was named Young New Zealander of the Year for 2017 for her services to human rights.

== Life ==
Gardi was born in a United Nations refugee camp in Quetta, Pakistan as her parents fled from persecution in their homeland of Kurdistan.

Gardi's mother fled the Kurdish region of Iraq when her village Sedakan was attacked by chemical weapons during the Anfal campaign. Gardi's grandmother and two aunts were killed in an attack by Saddam Hussein's Ba'ath regime and her grandfather was disabled. Gardi's father is from the Hakkari region in the Kurdish region of Turkey but was born in Iraqi Kurdistan. They then fled from Iraq to Iran as political refugees. Gardi's parents met as teenagers as part of a Kurdish human rights movement. Gardi's parents were forced to flee Iran to Pakistan as refugees.

Gardi's family were accepted as refugees in Pakistan and remained there until 1998 when they were resettled to New Zealand as part of the UNHCR resettlement programme.

Gardi has said that she was forced to lie about her Kurdish heritage at school to avoid Islamophobic bullying in the wake of the 9/11 attacks in the United States.

Gardi has two siblings: one sister and one brother.

== Education ==
Gardi graduated with a Bachelor of Laws (Honours) and a Bachelor of Arts (double major) in 2016 from the University of Auckland, where she was recognized as 40 under 40 alumni. She completed a Master of Law at Harvard Law School in 2019, becoming the first Kurd in history to graduate from Harvard Law. At Harvard Law School, she received the Dean's Award for Community Leadership and was a Class Day Speaker at the Harvard Law School Commencement. Gardi was awarded a Harvard Satter Human Rights Fellowship for her work in Iraq.

== Legal career and advocacy ==
Gardi is qualified to practice as a lawyer in the United States and New Zealand. Gardi is an international lawyer and currently serves as the Special Assistant to the United Nations High Commissioner for Refugees.

Previously she has worked as an international lawyer in the Kurdish region of Iraq.

Gardi worked as a Legal Officer at the New Zealand Human Rights Commission. Prior to that she was a solicitor at New Zealand law firm Chapman Tripp in the litigation team. She has previously worked at the United Nations Office in Nairobi, Kenya.

Gardi is a co-founder of the Centre for Asia Pacific Refugee Studies at the University of Auckland. Gardi has represented New Zealand at various international conferences. She represented New Zealand at the Global Refugee Youth Consultations and helped form the Global Youth Advisory Council to the UNHCR, she also has spoken at the UNHCR-NGO Consultations, and the High Commissioner's Dialogue on Protection Challenges, all in Geneva, the Asia Pacific Refugee Rights Conference in Bangkok, the Women Deliver Conference in Copenhagen and the OECD Forum in Paris.

Gardi supports young refugees to access higher education. She is the founder of ‘Empower’, a youth-led organisation aiming to address the underrepresentation of refugees in higher education. Empower enables refugee youth through education, leadership, and capacity-building. She is also working on projects in camps across Iraq and provides workshops to foster participation, leadership, and training opportunities for young refugees.

Gardi advocates for gender equality, particularly the many different forms of discrimination ethnic and minority women face in New Zealand. She is a young leader for SuperDIVERSE Women and raises awareness about the issues minority women face.

Gardi is an advocate for New Zealand increasing its refugee quota.

== Honours and awards ==
Gardi was awarded the Young New Zealander of the Year for 2017 for her services to human rights. She was a Women of Influence finalist in the Global category for 2017. In 2018 she was selected as a finalist of the Next Magazine Woman of the Year Awards. In 2019, she was awarded the Outstanding Youth Delegate Award at the UN Youth Assembly.

Gardi was awarded a Harvard Satter Human Rights Fellowship for her work in Iraq.

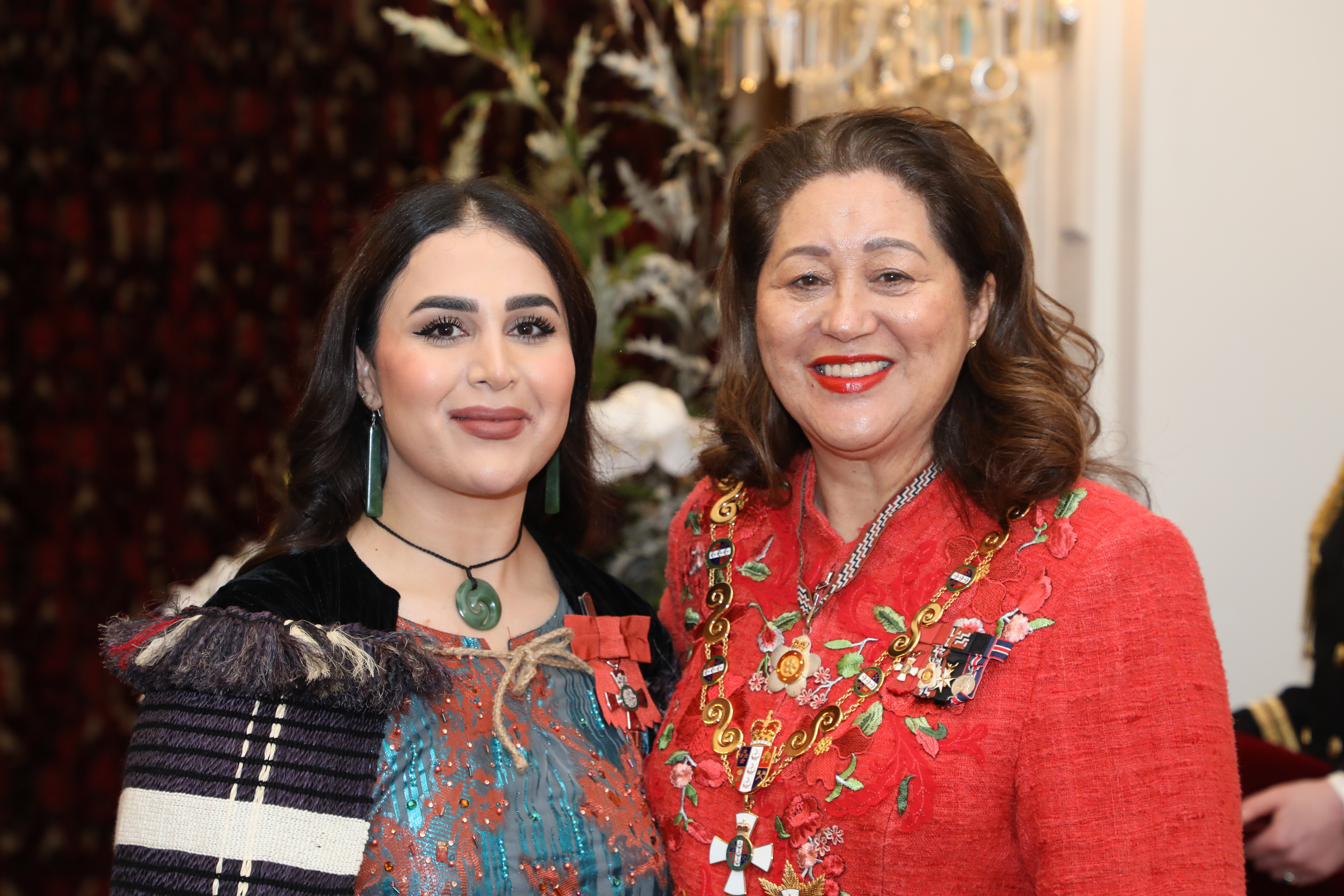
Gardi (left), after her investiture as a Member of the New Zealand Order of Merit by the governor-general, Dame Cindy Kiro, at Government House, Wellington, on 22 May 2026

In the 2025 King’s Birthday Honours, Gardi was appointed a Member of the New Zealand Order of Merit, for services to refugees and human rights advocacy.
