= William Casey (disambiguation) =

William J. Casey was the Director of Central Intelligence.

William, Willie, or Bill Casey may also refer to:

== Sports ==
=== Gaelic football ===
- Bill Casey (Gaelic footballer) (1918–1999), Irish Gaelic footballer
- Willie Casey (Gaelic footballer) (1932–2016), Irish Gaelic footballer
- Bill Casey (Dublin Gaelic footballer) (born 1939), Irish Gaelic footballer

=== Other sports ===
- Bill Casey (Australian footballer) (1872–1915), Australian rules footballer
- Mickey Casey (William Cofer Casey, 1905–1968), American baseball player
- William Casey (bobsleigh) (fl. 1940s), American bobsledder
- Willie Casey (born 1981), Irish professional boxer

== Others ==
- William E. "Bert" Casey (died 1903), notorious Oklahoma Terroritory outlaw
- William Casey (priest) (1844–1907), Catholic priest and leading member of the Irish National Land League
- William Casey (bishop) (died 1591), Anglican bishop in Ireland
- Father William Casey, who established Father Casey's GAA in 1884
- William Francis Casey (1884–1957), journalist and editor of The Times
- William Casey (Kentucky politician) (1754–1816), American politician, settler, and military officer
- William J. Casey (Massachusetts politician) (1905–1992), American politician
- Bill Casey (born 1945), Canadian politician
- William H. Casey (born 1955), American professor of chemistry and of geology

== See also ==
- Casey (disambiguation)
- William (disambiguation)
- William Case (disambiguation)
