= Paddy McConnell =

Irish footballer

Personal information
- Full name: Patrick McConnell
- Date of birth: 5 February 1900
- Place of birth: Rasharkin, Ireland
- Date of death: 14 November 1971 (aged 71)
- Place of death: Carluke, Scotland
- Position: Inside forward

Senior career*
Years	Team	Apps	(Gls)
- Bellshill Athletic
- Larkhall Thistle
1921–1924	Bathgate	94	(8)
1924–1925	Bradford City	3	(0)
1925–1930	Doncaster Rovers	137	(20)
1930–1932	Southport	48	(13)
1932–1933	Shelbourne		
1933–1934	Boston United	23	(10)
- Spalding United
1936	Grantham Town	4	(0)
1936–1937	Hibernian		

International career
1928–1932	Ireland	2	(0)
- * Club domestic league appearances and goals

Patrick McConnell (5 February 1900 – 14 November 1971) was an Irish footballer who played as an inside forward for Bradford City, Doncaster Rovers, Southport, Shelbourne, Boston United, Spalding United, Grantham Town, Hibernian and Ireland. In total he scored 30 goals from 201 matches in the Football League. He was both the first player representing both Doncaster and Southport to appear in an international match.

== Playing career ==
=== Scotland ===
Paddy McConnell began his career in Scottish Junior football playing for Bellshill Athletic and Larkhall Thistle, and with Bathgate in the second tier of the Scottish Football League.

=== England ===
McConnell joined Bradford City from Bathgate in August 1924. He made three league appearances for the club. He left the club in May 1925 to play for Doncaster Rovers.

=== International ===
He played twice for the all Ireland team, a 2–1 defeat against Wales in 1928 and a 6–2 defeat by England in 1932.
