= Rasharkin =

Village in County Antrim, Northern Ireland

Coordinates: 54.95382°N 6.48°W

Rasharkin: Irish: Ros Earcáin
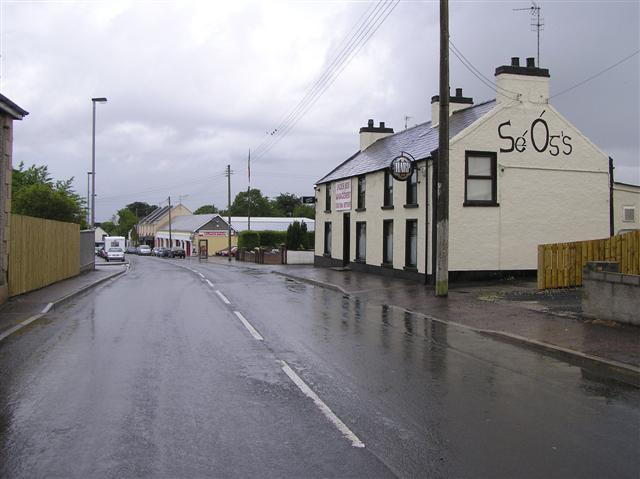
- Main Street

- Location within Northern Ireland
- Population: 1,114 (2011 census)
- Irish grid reference: C971134
  - Belfast: 38 miles
- District: Ballymoney
- County: County Antrim
- Country: Northern Ireland
- Sovereign state: United Kingdom
- Post town: BALLYMENA
- Postcode district: BT44
- Dialling code: 028, +44 28
- UK Parliament: North Antrim
- NI Assembly: North Antrim

Rasharkin (from Irish Ros Earcáin 'Earcán's promontory') is a small village and civil parish in County Antrim, Northern Ireland. It is 13 kilometres (8.1 mi) south of Ballymoney, near Dunloy and Kilrea. It had a population of 1,114 people in the 2011 census.

== Folklore ==
Rasharkin features in Buile Shuibhne an old Irish tale about the Suibhne mac Colmain, king of the Dál nAraidi, driven insane by St. Ronan's curse. The tale is the final installment of a three-text cycle in medieval Irish literature, continuing on from Fled Dúin na nGéd (the feast of Dun na nGéd) and Cath Maige Rátha (the battle of Mag Rath). King Sweeney's homeplace in the tale was Glenbuck that lies just outside Rasharkin. Seamus Heaney published an English version of the tale entitled Sweeney Astray.

== History ==
=== Pre-history ===
Craigs Dolmen, situated three miles north of Rasharkin, is a megalithic passage tomb featuring a big capstone on seven upright stones.

=== Early modern history ===
Historically Rasharkin, also spelt as 'Rosharkin' and 'Rosarkin', lay within the barony of Kilconway. This barony was controlled by the MacDonnell family in the 17th century.

In the period Irish Rebellion of 1798, a number of guns were reportedly robbed from a house in Rasharkin by a local member of the United Irishmen. Presbyterians and Catholics in the area were reputedly active in the United Irishmen and an account of a member of the Rasharkin yeomanry in 1865 states that "at a meeting of sixty five persons held for the formation of a rebel club in Rasharkin". A resolution moved and passed at one such meeting was that:

"Seeing that the prophecies of Peyden and Rhymer and all the old prophecies are now fulfilling and that the days of tyranny are numbered in accordance therewith and that the time for independence and equality in Ireland is now arrived we do hereby unite".

=== The Troubles ===
Three people were killed in the village of Rasharkin during the period of The Troubles (1960s–1998). John McFadden, a member of the Royal Ulster Constabulary (RUC), and Robert Irvine, a member of the Royal Irish Regiment (RIR), were killed by the Irish Republican Army (IRA) in separate incidents in 1983 and 1992. Gerard Casey, a member of the Irish Republican Army (IRA), was killed by the Ulster Freedom Fighters (UFF) in 1989.

== Churches ==
There are four churches in the village, including Presbyterian, Church of Ireland, Roman Catholic and Free Presbyterian churches.

The oldest remaining building is in the churchyard of St. Andrew's Church of Ireland. Built c.1650 on the site of a medieval church, this structure is now in ruins.

The Free Presbyterian Church in Rasharkin was one of the first congregations of the new Free Presbyterian Church in 1951 after a split with the local Presbyterian church.

== Sport ==
The local Gaelic Athletic Association (GAA) club is St Mary's GAC Rasharkin. Based in Dreen, the club fields hurling, camogie and Gaelic football teams.

A local association football (soccer) club, Rasharkin United F.C., competed in the Ballymena & Provincial League until their disbandment in 2012.

== Demography ==
=== 2011 census ===
Rasharkin had a population of 1,114 people (394 households) in the 2011 census. On census day in 2011:

- 75.6% were from a Catholic background and 20.8% were from a Protestant background

=== 2001 census ===
Rasharkin is classified as a small village or hamlet by the Northern Ireland Statistics and Research Agency (NISRA) (i.e. with population between 500 and 1,000 people). On census day in 2001 (29 April 2001), there were 864 people living in Rasharkin. Of these:

- 24.9% were aged under 16 years and 15.7% were aged 60 and over
- 48.4% of the population were male and 51.6% were female
- 73.5% were from a Catholic background and 26.0% were from a Protestant background
- 6.0% of people aged 16–74 were unemployed.

== People ==
- Chris Baird, footballer who won 79 caps for Northern Ireland, is from the village.
- Gerard Casey, IRA member killed by loyalists in 1989
- Tom Ekin, former Alliance Mayor of Belfast was raised in Rasharkin and went to school in the nearby townland of Ballymaconnelly.
- Robert Lynn, Member of Parliament for West Belfast 1922-29 and Member of NI Parliament for North Antrim 1929-45.
- Paddy McConnell, footballer born in 1900, who played for the all-island Ireland National Team
- Daithi McKay, newspaper columnist and former Sinn Féin Assembly Member for North Antrim (2007–2016).
- Karla Quinn, figure skater who was British Junior Ice Skating Champion in 2008.
- Tommy Smyth, Irish international rugby union prop who captained the British & Irish Lions tour of South Africa in 1910.

== See also ==
- List of towns and villages in Northern Ireland
- List of civil parishes of County Antrim
