= Samuel Casey (silversmith) =

American silversmith and counterfeiter

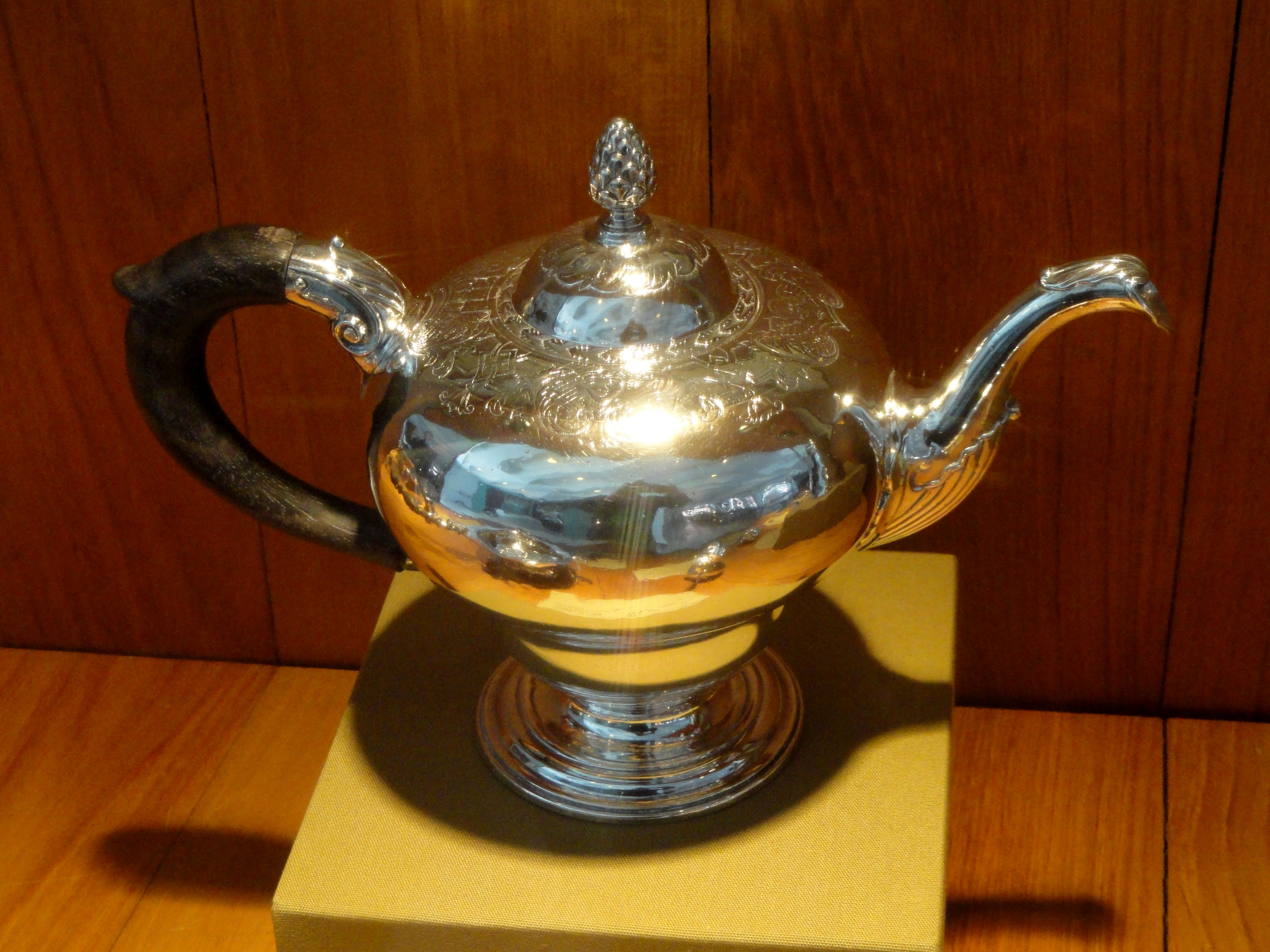
Teapot made by Samuel Casey, c. 1755

Samuel Casey (1723/4 – c. 1773) was a silversmith and counterfeiter active in Little Rest (Kingston), Rhode Island.

Casey was born in Newport, Rhode Island in 1723 or 1724, and said to have apprenticed with Boston silversmith Jacob Hurd. In 1745 he was admitted as a freeman in Exeter, Rhode Island, and by 1750, he had moved to Kingston, Rhode Island to a village then called Little Rest. Though Casey is often identified as a silver or goldsmith, he was also often described as a merchant. According to The Newport Mercury, his house and shop burned down in late September 1764:

the House of Samuel Casey, Esq; of South Kingstown, was reduced to Ashes. A large Variety of Furniture, a considerable Quantity of European Goods, with Drugs, Medicines, &c. makes Mr. Casey's Loss, as we are informed, amount to near Two Thousand Pounds Sterling. The most of his Books, and a small Part of his Furniture, were the principal of what was saved.

From 1765-1768, Casey was repeatedly brought to court for failure to pay debts. In September 1770, he and his younger brother were imprisoned on felony charges of counterfeiting. In October, a jury found them not guilty, which verdict was rejected by the judge. A week later he was sentenced to death by hanging, which sentence he appealed. In early November, however, The Pennsylvania Gazette reported that considerable new evidence had been unearthed against him:

in a Field in Little-Rest, a Sett of Instruments has been found, belonging to Samuel Casey, for counterfeiting Josephus's of 1756, 1760 and 1763; and for Dollars of 1766 and 1767. At Tower-Hill a Sett was found concealed in a Stone Wall, belonging to Samuel Wilson, for counterfeiting Dollars of 1748, 1763, 1764, and 1769; likewise for Pistareens of 1755.

However, as the Essex Gazette reported, he was freed that Saturday night:

Saturday last a considerable Number of People riotously assembled in King's County, and which their Faces black'd proceeded to his Majesty's Goal there, the outer Door of which they broke open with Iron Bars and Pick-Axes; they then violently entered the Goal, broke every Lock therein, and set at Liberty sundry Criminals, viz. William Reynolds, Thomas Clarke, Elisha Reynolds, and Samuel Casey, lately convicted of Money-making, one of whom (Samuel Casey) was under Sentence of Death.

After being freed by the mob, Casey fled Rhode Island. He is believed to have died around 1773, his whereabouts unknown. Today his silverware is collected in a number of museums including the Museum of Fine Arts, Boston, Yale University, Winterthur Museum, and Hood Museum of Art.
