= John Casey (climate change author) =

American writer on climate change

John L. Casey
- Born: John L. Casey
- Occupation: Author
- Notable work: Upheaval, Dark Winter, Cold Sun

John L. Casey is an American author and a global warming denier. He believes climate change is caused by natural forces. Mr. Casey warns of greater climate change threat than most modern Climate Change proponents. His books include Dark Winter and Cold Sun. He currently lives in Orlando, Florida.

== Career ==
Casey received his B.S. in physics and mathematics from Jacksonville State University and his MA in management from Webster University.

Casey's first book, Cold Sun, was published on May 1, 2011. His second book, Dark Winter, which is a refinement of his first, was published on August 19, 2014.

Casey's newest work, Upheaval, was published on December 14, 2016. Unlike the first two books, Upheaval is primarily about his predictions of potentially-catastrophic earthquakes in the United States.

Casey's biographical page says that he is the President of the Space and Science Research Corporation (SSRC), which shut down in August 2015. He is also the acting CEO of the International Earthquake and Volcano Prediction Center (IEVPC). Casey is the acting president of the Veritence Corporation, a science and engineering consultation company.

== Theory ==
Casey has written two books, which reject global warming and argue instead that earth is threatened with solar hibernation.

Global cooling is the central theory presented in Casey's Cold Sun and Dark Winter. Casey's theory, in particular, revolves around the belief that industrial carbon dioxide emissions are not large enough to cause a change in the Earth's climate and that climate change is entirely impacted by the Sun. Dark Winter also notes that global climate cooling would begin approximately 3–14 years past Casey's initial discovery.

According to Casey, the Earth is currently going through an interglacial warm period, a rare time of reprieve from an otherwise-cold Earth. That period of warmth essentially serves as Casey's explanation for the exponential growth of human civilization in the past few millennia. Moreover, Casey makes note that the period of warmth and prosperity, according to his calculation, is on the brink of ending.

Casey's theory also emphasizes the importance of sunspot patterns in determining the sun's effect on earth's climate. He believes that the numerous sunspot patterns that have been observed throughout earth's history have affected the global climate in various ways. Casey's theory is that the sun is in a 206-year cycle and that a drastic cycle change is imminent, which believes will lead to the severe cooling of the earth.

Another central point in Casey's theory is the lack of counterstrategy in regards to the advent of an ice age. Casey states that "solar hibernation" is ultimately inevitable and that the sun will continue to cycle into its next stage, regardless of the actions of the common man.

Casey, however, does not have any qualifications in climate science, and analysts have pointed out that he "ignores multiple problems with his analysis."
