= Eoghan Casey =

Eoghan Casey is a digital forensics professional, researcher, and author. Casey has conducted a wide range of digital investigations, including data breaches, fraud, violent crimes, identity theft, and on-line criminal activity. He is also a member of the Digital/Multimedia Scientific Area Committee of the Organization for Scientific Area Committees. He helps organize the digital forensic research DFRWS.org conferences each year, and is on the DFRWS board of directors. He has a B.S. in mechanical engineering from the University of California, Berkeley, an M.A. in educational communication and technology from New York University, and a Ph.D. in computer science from University College Dublin.

== Career ==
Casey has worked as Lead Cyber Security Engineer at The MITRE Corporation, and as R&D Team Lead in the Defense Cyber Crime Institute (DCCI) at the Department of Defense Cyber Crime Center (DC3). He was Director of Digital Forensics and Investigations at the DC office of Stroz Friedberg, and he later co-founded cmdLabs with Christopher Daywalt and Terrance Maguire.

In 2012, he founded the company CASEITE and co-managed the Risk Prevention and Response business unit at DFLabs. Eoghan has helped organizations investigate and manage security breaches, including network intrusions with international scope. He has delivered expert testimony in civil and criminal cases, and has submitted expert reports and prepared trial exhibits for computer forensic and cyber-crime cases.

He has authored a number of books in the field of digital forensics including Digital Evidence and Computer Crime now in its third edition, the Handbook of Digital Forensics and Investigation, and Malware Forensics.

Casey taught digital forensic to graduate students at Johns Hopkins University Information Security Institute. He also created Smartphone Forensics courses taught worldwide. He has delivered keynotes and taught workshops around the globe on various topics related to data breach investigation, digital forensics and cyber security.

Casey is editor-in-chief of the journal Digital Investigation: The International Journal of Digital Forensics and Incident Response.

== Books ==
- Casey, Eoghan (2002). Handbook of computer crime investigation: forensic tools and technology. Academic Press. p. 448. ISBN 0-12-163103-6.
- Casey, Eoghan (2008). Malware Forensics: Investigating and Analyzing Malicious Code. Syngress. p. 840. ISBN 978-1597492683.
- Casey, Eoghan (2009). Handbook of Digital Forensics and Investigation. Elsevier. p. 576. ISBN 978-0123742674.
- Casey, Eoghan (2011). Digital Evidence and Computer Crime, Third Edition: Forensic Science, Computers, and the Internet. Academic Press. p. 840. ISBN 978-0123742681.
