= Cayce =

Cayce may refer to:

== Places in the United States ==
- Cayce, Kentucky
- Cayce, Mississippi
- Cayce, South Carolina
- James A. Cayce Homes, a housing project in Nashville, Tennessee

== Other uses ==
- Edgar Cayce (1877–1945), American psychic, also notable for his thoughts on health and nutrition
- Cayce Pollard, protagonist of William Gibson's 2003 novel Pattern Recognition

== See also ==
- Casey (disambiguation)
