= Robert Casey =

Robert or Bob Casey may refer to:

== American politicians ==
- Robert E. Casey (1909–1982), Pennsylvania Treasurer, 1977–1981
- Robert R. Casey (1915–1986), House of Representatives member from Texas
- Robert F. Casey (1921–2006), Illinois House of Representatives member
- Bob Casey Sr. (1932–2000), 42nd Governor of Pennsylvania, 1987–1995
- Bob Casey Jr. (born 1960), son of Bob Casey Sr., Senator from Pennsylvania, 2007–2025
- Bob Casey (Florida politician) (1931–2015), Florida House of Representatives member

== Sportsmen ==
- Bob Casey (third baseman) (1859–1939), Canadian who played for Detroit Wolverines
- Bob Casey (baseball announcer) (1925–2005), American announcer for Minnesota Twins
- Bob Casey (rugby union) (born 1978), Irish lock for Leinster and London Irish

== Others ==
- Robert J. Casey (1890–1962), American journalist of World War I and II
- Bob Casey (musician) (1909–1986), American jazz double-bassist
- Robert Gerald Casey (born 1967), American Catholic Archbishop of Cincinnati
