= E. Owens Blackburne =

Writer, poet, novelist

- Born: Elizabeth Owens Blackburne Casey; 10 May 1848; Slane, County Meath
- Died: 6 April 1894 (aged 45); Drumcondra, Dublin

Elizabeth Owens Blackburne Casey (10 May 1848 – 6 April 1894) was an Irish writer and novelist who published the first biographical reference book of Irish women. She used the pen name of E. Owens Blackburne.

== Early life and education ==
Born Elizabeth Owens Blackburne Casey on 10 May 1848 in Slane, County Meath, to Andrew Casey and Miss Mills. She went blind when she was 11 but had her sight restored by Sir William Wilde. Casey was educated in Trinity College Dublin. She became a writer and contributed to the Irish Nationalist paper, The Nation. She moved to London when she was about 25 to work as a journalist. It was there she published several novels which were quite popular. However one of her novels Erin: A Story of Today was published at about the same time as the Phoenix Park Murders which damaged her reputation and resulted in a loss of sales for her. As a result, she required support from the Royal Literary Fund to survive. She lived poorly and died in a fire in Drumcondra, Dublin in 1894.

== Timing ==
The timing of a story calling for greater understanding between Ireland and England in a time when the political situation between the two countries was tense and two senior officials had just been murdered by radical rebels meant that Casey was treated very badly by the press. In the London Athenaeum review on 20 May 1882 the press called Blackburne "a thoroughgoing partisan of the Land League". As a result, her books would no longer be published.

== Bibliography ==
- A Woman Scorned (1876 and 1887)
- A Bunch of Shamrocks (1877)
- Illustrious Irishwomen (1877)
- Molly Carew (1879)
- The Glen of the Silver Birches (1880)
- My Sweetheart When a Boy (1880)
- As the Crow Flies (1880)
- The Love That Loves Always (1881)
- The Heart of Erin: An Irish Story of Today (1882)
- Con O’Donnell, and Other Legends and Poems for Recitation (1890)
- Aunt Delia's Heir
- In the Vale of Honey
- Shadows in the Sunlight
- A Modern Parnassus
- The Way Women Love
- A Chronicle of Barham
