= Michael Casey =

Michael Casey may refer to:

- Michael Casey (poet) (born 1947), American poet
- Michael Casey (academic), professor of music at Dartmouth College
- Michael Casey (unionist) (1860–1937), Irish-born American labor unionist
- Michael C. Casey, American national security official
- Michael T. Casey (1902–1997), Irish Dominican priest and chemist
- Michael James Casey (1918–1944), British bomber pilot
- Michael E. Casey (1870–1949), American politician and lawyer in Missouri
- Michael Casey (athlete), Irish racewalker at the 1996 European Race Walking Cup
- Michael "Iceman" Casey, fictional character in Wing Commander franchise
- Michael Casey (Sons of Anarchy), fictional character
- Michael Casey, comedic recording artist and pseudonym of Russell Hunting (1864–1943)

== See also ==
- Mike Casey (disambiguation)
