= Kevin Casey =

Kevin Casey may refer to:

- Kevin Casey (fighter) (born 1981), American mixed martial artist
- Kevin Casey (broadcaster) (1976–2017), Irish radio presenter
- Kevin Casey, a 2007 character from the Australian television soap opera Neighbours
- Kevin Casey (Scrubs), a character from the American medical comedy-drama television series Scrubs
