= New Zealand Medical Students' Association =

- Location: New Zealand
- Established: 1972
- Members: c. 3,000
- Website: www.nzmsa.org.nz

The New Zealand Medical Students' Association Incorporated (NZMSA) is the peak representative body for all medical students in New Zealand. The NZMSA executive is composed of representatives that are elected from Auckland, Wellington, Christchurch and Dunedin medical schools. NZMSA represents medical students on many levels, from universities to government representation.

== Membership ==
Membership is open to students who are enrolled in the Bachelor of Medicine and Bachelor of Surgery (MBChB) degree at either the University of Otago or the University of Auckland in New Zealand.

== Presidents ==
The president is elected annually by the NZMSA Executive and holds the position for one year. Any member is eligible to run for the position of president.

=== Previous Presidents ===
- 2001: Richard Pole
- 2002: Cindy Towns
- 2003: Brandon Adams
- 2004: Jess Allen
- 2005: Jesse Gale
- 2006: Xaviour Walker
- 2007: Nick Fancourt
- 2008: Anna Dare
- 2009: William Perry
- 2010: Elizabeth Carr
- 2011: Oliver Hansby
- 2012: Michael Chen-Xu
- 2013: Phillip Chao
- 2014: Marise Stuart
- 2015: Elizabeth Berryman
- 2016: Mike Fleete
- 2017: Kieran Bunn
- 2018: Jibi Kunnethedam
- 2019: Fraser Jeffery
- 2020: Ellie Baxter
- 2021: Anu Kaw
- 2022: Anu Kaw
- 2023: Thomas Swinburn
- 2024: Indira Fernando
- 2025: Thomas Hartono

== Awards ==
NZMSA issues two awards per year to a nominated member of the association. The awards are the NZMSA President's Award for Individual Excellence and the NZMSA Award for Best New Student Initiative.

=== NZMSA President's Award for Individual Excellence ===
This is awarded to "a student who makes an outstanding contribution to the medical student body, recognised for creative problem solving; inspiring their peers and others around them; and their energy and enthusiasm for medicine, education and their community".

==== Previous Recipients ====
- 2010: Sylvia Ross, University of Otago Christchurch School of Medicine
- 2011: Sudhvir Singh, University of Auckland

=== NZMSA Award for Best New Student Initiative ===
This is awarded to "an individual or group of students who have started the most innovative and successful project for that preceding academic year".

==== Previous Recipients ====
- 2010: 11th Edition of the New Zealand Medical Student Journal (NZMSJ)
- 2011: Trainee Intern Anatomy, University of Otago

== Annual conference ==
Each year, the New Zealand Medical Students' Association holds a conference which brings together medical students from all around the country.

The location of the conference varies from year to year. In 2011, the conference was held in Auckland.

== NZMSA Sports Exchange ==
The annual NZMSA Sports Exchange was established in 2010. Teams from each of the four medical schools in New Zealand compete in a variety of sports.

=== Previous winners ===
- 2010: The University of Otago, Dunedin
- 2011: The University of Auckland

== New Zealand Medical Student Journal ==
=== History ===
The New Zealand Medical Student Journal (NZMSJ), Te Hautaka o nga Akonga Rongoa, was initiated by a group of students at the Otago Medical School, publishing its first issue in 2004. The journal was launched by then Health Minister Annette King in March 2004, and the first editor was Ayesha Verrall. Later editors include John Scotter, Brian Grainger, Benson Chen, and Mariam Parwaiz. From 2010 the journal is published by the NZ Medical Student Journal Society, a registered charity. In 2011 the journal was awarded the NZMSA Award for Best New Student Initiative. The journal published its twentieth anniversary issue (issue number 38) in December 2024, in which editor Lorna Pairman described it as "one of the longest-running medical student journals internationally".

=== Aims ===
The NZMSJ is an open access journal, with no publication charges, which is published by medical students. The journal's aims are to assist students to learn how to write for academic journals, to be a forum for medical student discussion at national and international levels, and to promote student research and academia. It is indexed by Google Scholar.

A matched-cohort study reported in the NZMSJ showed that students who published in the NZMSJ were more likely to go on to earn a PhD, to publish in other peer-reviewed journals and to obtain academic positions.

== See also ==
- Medical school
