= Rafael Rivera =

Mexican scout who discovered Las Vegas

Raphael Rivera
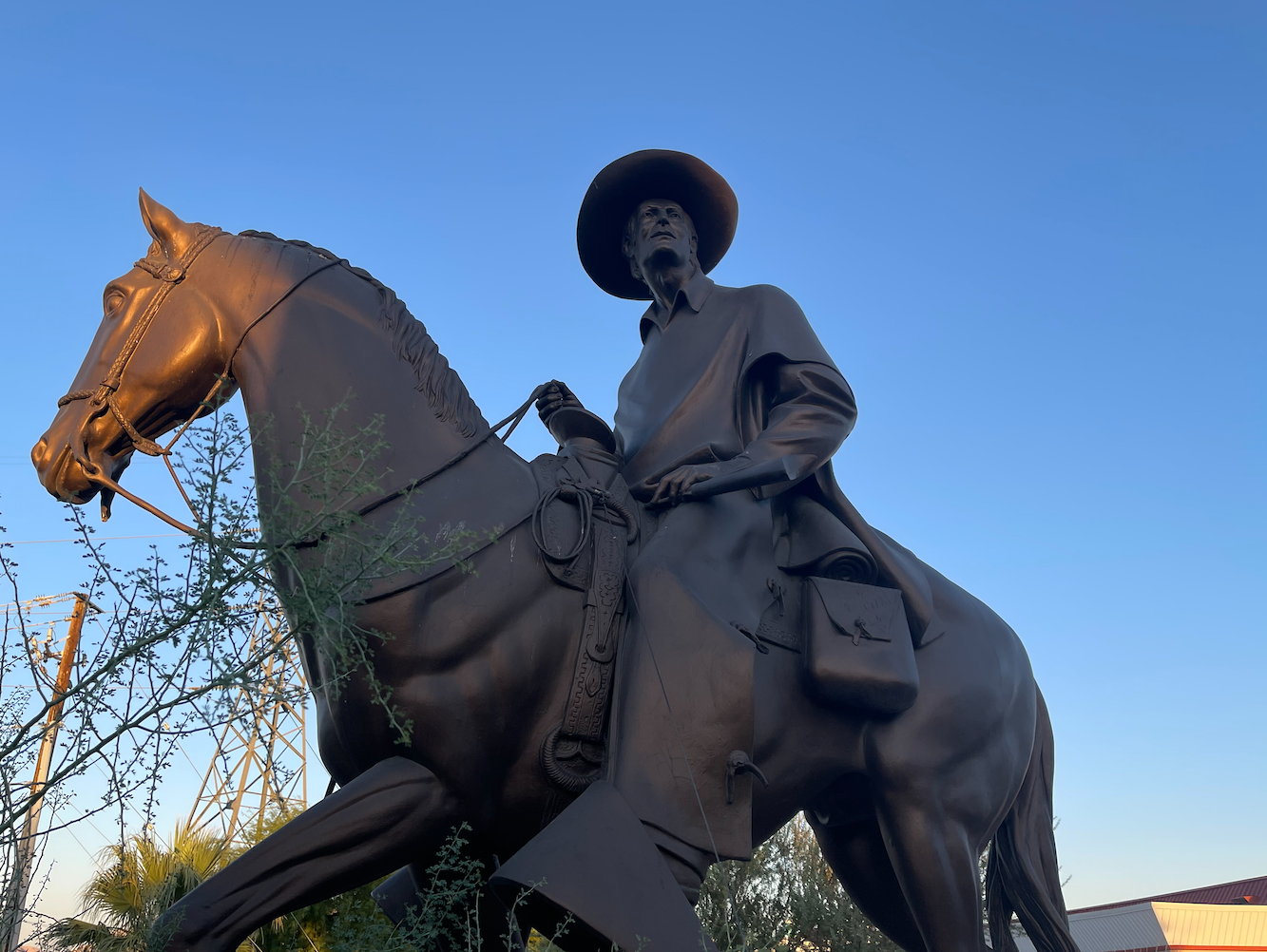
- Equestrian statue of Rafael Rivera in Las Vegas, Nevada
- Occupation: Scout

Rafael Rivera was a New Mexican scout who took part in Antonio Armijo's Spanish Trail expedition from Nuevo México in 1829. Armijo led a trader caravan group to Los Angeles, California on Christmas Day about 100 miles northeast of present-day Las Vegas a scouting party rode west in search for water. The inexperienced Rivera left the main party and ventured into unexplored area. Within two weeks, he discovered the Las Vegas Springs. The abundant artesian spring water discovered at Las Vegas shortened the Spanish Trail to Los Angeles. About 14 years later after Rivera's discovery, John C. Frémont led an expedition west and camped at Las Vegas Springs on May 13, 1844.

The Rafael Rivera Park (a community center) and Rafael Rivera Way (a frontage road of Clark County Route 215) are named after him. He is also commemorated by Nevada Historical Marker No. 214.
