= George Casey =

George Casey may refer to:

- George W. Casey Sr. (1922–1970), U.S. Army general
- George W. Casey Jr. (born 1948), Chief of Staff of the U.S. Army, and the son of the above
- George Elliott Casey (1850–1903), Canadian journalist and politician
- George Casey (rugby league), Australian rugby league player of the 1920s
