= Sean Carey =

Sean Carey may refer to:

- Sean Carey (Gaelic footballer) (born 1989), Gaelic footballer from Co Tipperary
- S. Carey (Sean Carey), drummer and supporting vocalist of American indie folk band Bon Iver
- Sean Carey, a guitarist for Australian pop-rock band Thirsty Merc
- Seán Carey, Irish West End actor

== See also ==
- Sean Cary, Australia cricketer
- Shaun Carey, English footballer
