= Peter Casey (disambiguation) =

Peter Casey (born 1957) is an Irish entrepreneur, television personality and political candidate.

Peter Casey may also refer to:

- Peter Casey (horse trainer) (c. 1935–2018), Irish horse trainer
- Peter Casey (screenwriter) (born 1950), American television producer and screenwriter
- Peter Casey (hurler) (born 1997), Irish hurler

== See also ==
- Pete Casey (1895–1976), American football player
