= Adam Casey =

Adam Casey may refer to:

- Adam Casey (soccer) (born 1986), Australian footballer
- Adam Casey (curler) (born 1989), Canadian curler
