= Al Casey =

Al Casey may refer to:

- Al Casey (jazz guitarist) (1915–2005), American
- Al Casey (rock guitarist) (1936–2006), American

== See also ==
- Albert Vincent Casey, publisher
