= James Casey (poet-priest) =

Irish priest & poet (1824–1909)

James Kevin Casey (1824–1909) was an Irish priest in Ballygar and Athleague and principal of St John's seminary in Sligo. He composed many didactic poems which were popular and published in collections. Their subjects included materialism, devotion, the Irish language and, most especially, temperance. An example is a verse of The Toper and his Bottle,

I curse the day I met you, John,
I curse the luckless hour
I tasted first your flavoured cup,
And felt its magic power.

Casey was an inspiration for the "Poet of the Pick", Jem Casey, a character in Flann O'Brien's satirical novel At Swim-Two-Birds. Jem Casey was a labourer who wrote "pomes" such as The Workman's Friend,

When money's tight and is hard to get
And your horse has also ran,
When all you have is a heap of debt –
A PINT OF PLAIN IS YOUR ONLY MAN.

== Works ==
- Gladstone and the Vatican Decrees, 1875
- Tyndall and Materialism, 1875
- Intemperance, 1877
- Our Thirst for Drink : Its Cause and Cure, 1879
- Verses on Doctrinal and Devotional Subjects, 1882
- Paddy Blake's Sojourn Among the Soupers, 1884
