= Sustainable Business Network =

Social enterprise in Auckland, New Zealand

- Formation: October 2002
- Founder: Rachel Brown
- Type: social enterprise
- Location: Auckland, New Zealand
- Website: sustainable.org.nz

The Sustainable Business Network (SBN) is a membership-based social enterprise located in Auckland, New Zealand. The network was created in October 2002 by its founder and CEO Rachel Brown.

== History ==
The network was founded by Rachel Brown in 2002, who continues to serve as the CEO. It is a forum for businesses, government groups, and related organizations throughout New Zealand interested in sustainable business practices, and sustainable development. The network also focuses on water, waste and climate. The ultimate goal of the SBN is to make New Zealand a model sustainable nation, and maintains 500 member companies.

Members are offered networking, educational, and organizational opportunities in order for them to reach their sustainability goals. SBN helps its members to collaborate and learn, profile stories, connect, and access practical support.

=== Campaign for sustainable KiwiSaver options ===
In January 2015, Chief Executive Rachel Brown following survey data indications asserted there was strong demand for an ethical and sustainable KiwiSaver provider which was not being met by the current market; claiming a mismatch between their criteria and the options being presented through ethical funds at the time. A survey the SBN had conducted of 1,400 people in June 2014 indicated that 90 percent of people wanted a sustainable Kiwisaver option, while 97 percent would actually move to one if the rate of return were the same as conventional schemes. Brown had stated that she was in talks with a number of banks interested in setting up green KiwiSaver funds, which she hoped would launch in 2016.

=== Online green business course ===
In January 2015, it was announced that the New Zealand Marketing Association in conjunction with the SBN, and GoodSense Learning, were planning to launch an online professional course in green marketing called "Sustainable Marketing Online".

== Organisation ==
=== Transformation areas ===
SBN focuses its activity around four transformation areas it sees as especially critical for New Zealand:

- Renewables: enabling the use of renewable energy
- Community: building thriving communities
- Mega efficiency: maximising the use of all resources
- Restorative: enhancing New Zealand's natural capital

All of the SBN's projects and activities are aligned with one or more of these transformation areas.

=== Membership ===
Members are given access to resources and knowledge that facilitate them to become a more sustainable business. A membership fee is paid to the SBN based on the organization's turnover. Once a member, the company is introduced into the network of other SBN members, where they can share each other's knowledge and come to events to hear other members speak. Members are profiled on the SBN membership directory, receive discounts on national events, and are invited to participate in the NZI National Sustainable Business Network Awards as business transformation projects.

Members also have access to SBN tools such as the Get Sust Online assessment tool, which allows companies to track progress, see where they could improve, how they stack against other companies, and give them access to resources. Additional member benefits include participation in business transformation projects and access to the Carbon4Good Calculator, which allows companies to view their emissions and shows them how to offset them.

== NZI National Sustainable Business Network Awards ==
Every year, the SBN holds the NZI National Sustainable Business Network Awards. They are the longest-standing sustainability awards in New Zealand, and they showcase businesses, groups, and individuals for their sustainable business practices. Members and non-members throughout New Zealand are welcome to enter, and in 2013, there were more than 230 entries for the awards. The awards are based on the transformation areas and include:

- NZI Greatest Contribution to a Sustainable New Zealand
- Renewables - Innovation
- Renewables - Impact
- Community - Impact
- Community Innovation
- Mega-efficiency - Innovation
- Mega-efficiency - Impact
- Restorative - Innovation
- Restorative - Impact
- Communicating Sustainability
- Sustainability Champion
- Energy Management
