= Infinityplusone =

New Zealand maths teacher and YouTuber

infinityplusone
- Born: Subash Chandar K 1981 or 1982 (age 44–45)

YouTube information
- Channel: infinityplusone
- Years active: 2013–present
- Genre: Education
- Subscribers: 74.5 thousand
- Views: 10 million
- Last updated: 7 November 2026

Subash Chandar K (born 1981 or 1982) is an Indian-New Zealand mathematics teacher in Auckland. He runs a YouTube channel named infinityplusone, where he teaches secondary school students and prepares them for NCEA exams. In 2025 Chandar K was awarded the Local Hero of the Year award at the New Zealander of the Year Awards.

== Biography ==
Chandar K moved from Chennai, India, to New Zealand aged 12. His mother was a maths professor in Chennai. As of 2025, Chandar K lives in Auckland and teaches at Ormiston Junior College in Flat Bush.

His YouTube channel infinityplusone has 70,700 subscribers as of July 2026, and was named after the amount he loved his wife. On the channel he helps students prepare for NCEA exams by running live streams the nights before the exams are run, and makes videos which explain how to use equations and calculators. The channel was started in 2013 because Chander K noticed a lack of maths videos designed for children. His first live stream was in 2018.

In 2018 Chandar K won the National Excellence in Education Awards top honour. In January 2025 Chandar K became one of the 10 finalists of the Global Teacher Prize. Chandar K said that after he discovered the award in 2017, he began working towards it. In March 2025 Chandar K was awarded the Local Hero of the Year award at the New Zealander of the Year Awards.
