= James Casey =

James Casey may refer to:

- James Casey (Australian politician) (1831–1913), politician in colonial Victoria (Australia), Solicitor-General
- James Casey (poet-priest) (1824–1909), priest and composer of temperance poetry
- James S. Casey (1833–1899), US Army officer and Medal of Honor recipient
- Doc Casey (1870–1936), baseball player
- James E. Casey (1888–1983), American businessman
- James Casey (1892–1965) English music-hall comedian better known as Jimmy James (comedian)
- James Vincent Casey (1914–1986), American bishop
- James Casey (variety artist) (1922–2011), English variety comedian and BBC Radio producer
- James J. Casey (1926–1989), American politician and civil servant
- James Casey (musician) (1983–2023), American saxophonist
- James Casey (American football) (born 1984), American football fullback
- Jim Casey (politician), Vermont state representative

== See also ==
- Jim Casey (footballer) (born 1957), Scottish footballer
- James Cassie (1819–1879), Scottish painter
- Casey James (born 1982), American singer
- Kasey James, American wrestler
