= Hugh Casey =

Hugh Casey may refer to:

- Hugh Casey (baseball) (1913–1951), Major League Baseball pitcher
- Hugh Casey (politician) (1927–2013), politician in Northern Ireland
- Hugh Boyd Casey (1925–1952), United States Army officer
- Hugh John Casey (1898–1981), his father, United States Army officer
