= Patrick Casey =

Patrick Casey (or Pat or Paddy) may refer to:

- Patrick Casey (bishop of Ross, Ireland) (1873–1940), Irish Roman Catholic bishop
- Patrick Casey (bishop of Brentwood) (Patrick Joseph Casey, 1913–1999), English bishop
- Patrick Casey (rugby union) (Patrick Joseph Casey, born 1941), Irish rugby union player
- Pat Casey (baseball) (born 1959), American baseball coach
- Pat Casey (politician) (born 1962), Irish politician
- Patrick J. Casey, American biochemist and molecular pharmacologist
- Pat Casey, CTO and EVP of DevOps Servicenow
- Paddy Casey (born 1975), Irish musician
- Patrick Casey (writer) (born 1978), American writer and actor
- Patrick Casey (white supremacist) (born 1989), American neo-Nazi
- Patrick Casey (runner) (born 1990), American middle-distance runner
- Pat Casey (BMX) (1993–2023), American freestyle BMX rider
- Patrick Casey (footballer) (born 2006), Irish footballer
