= Richard Casey =

Richard Casey may refer to:

- Richard Casey, Baron Casey (1890–1976), Australian governor-general, politician, and diplomat
- Richard Casey (Queensland politician) (1846–1919), Australian politician
- Richard C. Casey (1933–2007), U.S. district judge for the Southern District of New York
- Dick Casey (c. 1881–1919), Australian rules footballer
