= Mike Casey (labor leader) =

American labor unionist

Mike Casey addresses workers in San Francisco.

Mike Casey (born January 6, 1958) is the president of the San Francisco Labor Council and the former president of the 12,000-member Local 2 chapter of UNITE HERE, the union that represents hotel and restaurant workers in San Francisco. He was elected president of the union, Local 2, in 1994 and succeeded by Anand Singh in June 2015.

Casey has a reputation as a hard-nosed negotiator and a creative union leader. In 1994, he led a successful 73-day strike to reach an agreement with the Mark Hopkins hotel. He led seven-year battles to unionize the Parc 55 and the San Francisco Marriott hotels, and a nine-year crusade to reach an agreement with the Sir Francis Drake hotel.

In 2002, after UNITE HERE won an agreement with the San Francisco Marriott hotels, Marriott executive Hank Biddle said about Casey at a banquet to mark the agreement, "The things you said you were going to deliver, you delivered. And when you looked me in the eye and said you were going to have 1,000 (demonstrators) out in front of this hotel, damned if you didn't do that, too."

At the appointment of Mayor Willie Brown, Casey served as a City Commissioner on San Francisco's Municipal Transportation Agency from 2000 to 2004. He is president of the San Francisco Labor Council (see Who waits in the wings), a Vice President of the California Labor Federation and a Vice President of the International Union of Unite Here.

The son of union activists, Casey was born in San Francisco and grew up in Stockton and Sacramento. Prior to joining UNITE HERE in 1986, Casey worked for the Farm Labor Organizing Committee. He studied Irish literature at UC Berkeley. He is married with two children.
