= Tom Casey (diplomat) =

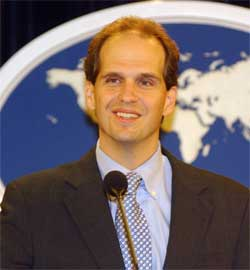
Tom Casey

Tom Casey is a U.S. diplomat. He was the Deputy Spokesman and Deputy Assistant Secretary for Public Affairs at the United States Department of State, a position to which he was appointed on 3 July 2006. Immediately prior to this assignment, he served as Director of the Office of Press Relations.

Casey joined the Foreign Service in 1988 and was first posted to the U.S. Embassy in Caracas, Venezuela. He has served overseas in public affairs positions at the U.S. embassies in Lagos, Nigeria, and Lima, Peru, as well as at the U.S. Mission to NATO in Brussels, Belgium.

In Washington, D.C., Casey has worked as a public affairs advisor for the Bureau of Western Hemisphere Affairs, and in a number of positions dealing with NATO and European Union issues in the Bureau of European and Eurasian Affairs.

Prior to his entry into the Foreign Service, Casey worked as a management analyst at the United States Department of Justice. A native of the state of New Jersey, he holds a Bachelor of Arts in political science from Tufts University, and a Master of Arts in Law and Diplomacy from the Fletcher School of Law and Diplomacy.

== Sources ==
The original version of this article was taken from Tom Casey: Biography, a public domain publication of the U.S. State Department.
