= Tommy Casey (baseball) =

American baseball player

- Pitcher
- Batted: Unknown Threw: Left

MLB debut
- August 17, 1887, for the Philadelphia Athletics

Last MLB appearance
- August 17, 1887, for the Philadelphia Athletics

MLB statistics
- Win–loss record: 0–0
- Earned run average: 18.00
- Strikeouts: 0
- Stats at Baseball Reference

Teams
- Philadelphia Athletics (1887)

Tommy Casey was a professional baseball pitcher in the American Association. He pitched in one game on August 17, 1887, for the Philadelphia Athletics.
