= Gerard Casey (artist) =

Irish artist

Gerard Casey, Irish artist, was born, lives and works in Kilkenny, Ireland. He studied in Limerick, and Cork, Ireland and Ontario, in Canada Colleges of Art. He has had many exhibitions all around Ireland.

Gerard Casey has been a lecturer at Waterford Institute of Technology since 1985.

== Performances ==
- Belltable Arts Centre, Limerick, 1993
- Sligo Art Gallery, Sligo, 1995
- Kilkenny County Council, Kilkenny, 1996
- Market House, Monaghan, 1996

== Awards ==
- Oireachtas - Douglas Hyde Gold Medal awarded by The Arts Council in 1993;
- Arts Council Travel Awards in 1991, 1993, 1994 and 1997;
- Tyrone Guthrie Centre, Annamakerrig - Residency in 1994.
