= Kenneth L. Casey =

American neuroscientist

Kenneth Lyman Casey (born 1935) is professor emeritus of neurology and professor emeritus of molecular and integrative physiology at the University of Michigan, and consultant in neurology at the Ann Arbor Veteran's Affairs Medical Center.

Casey studied medicine at the University of Washington (Seattle), did his internship at The New York Hospital (Cornell Medical Center), and did postdoctoral work at the National Institutes of Health (NIH) and McGill University and joined the University of Michigan faculty, where he completed his training in neurology. While at McGill, he and Ronald Melzack devised the now widely accepted model of the three dimensions of pain. He was the first to record the responses of single neurons to noxious stimuli in an awake animal and, with colleagues, to use functional brain imaging to show responses in the human brain specifically to heat pain as compared to increases in temperature.

In 2019 Casey published Chasing Pain: The Search for a Neurobiological Mechanism.
