= Ron Casey =

Ron Casey may refer to:

- Ron Casey (Melbourne broadcaster) (1927–2000), Australian broadcaster, television executive and Australian rules football administrator
- Ron Casey (Sydney broadcaster) (1929–2018), Australian television presenter and talkback radio host
- Ron Casey, American drummer of Brain Drill
- Ron Casey (editor) (1951–2000), Pulitzer Prize–winning editorial writer from the United States
- Ron Casey (Canadian politician) (born c. 1950), Alberta, Canada, politician
- Ron Casey (Missouri politician) (1952–2014), state representative
