= Gerard Casey (Irish republican) =

Irish Republican

Gerard Casey on an unknown date

Gerard Casey (c. 1960 – 4 April 1989) was a member of the 1st North Antrim Brigade of the Provisional Irish Republican Army.

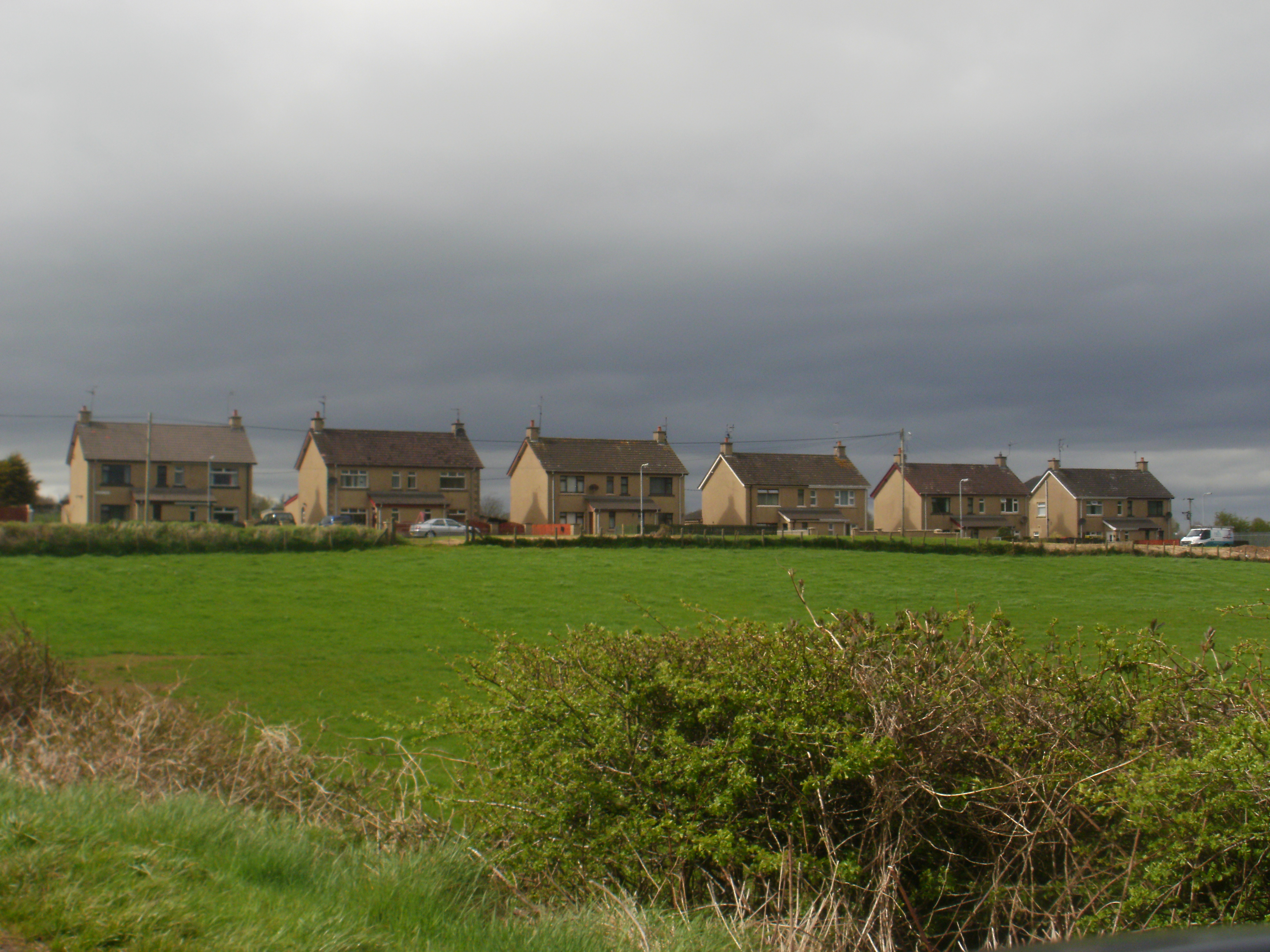
Shamrock Park where Casey resided and the scene of his killing

Casey, a Catholic, first joined the IRA in 1985. Like some of his colleagues, his membership was clandestine. In October 1988 Casey's home in Shamrock Park outside Rasharkin was raided by the Royal Ulster Constabulary (RUC). While there they removed a legally held shotgun. Casey was charged with possession of explosives, and was taken away to Castlereagh holding centre, where he was interrogated for information on his fellow volunteers in the IRA.

On 4 April 1989, two members of the Ulster Defence Association (UDA, a loyalist paramilitary group), wearing balaclavas and green army jackets, burst into his house and shot him with a shotgun and a pistol from close range as he slept. Only Casey was killed in the attack; his wife, who was beside him in the bed, and three children were not harmed. The funeral was attended by a crowd of up to 500 mourners despite a police presence of around 200 officers. A minor altercation between police and mourners occurred. Neighbours described him as "a quiet family man with no interest in any political activities". Even though his membership was relatively unknown, Casey remains one of if not the most prominent figure to have been killed in North Antrim. And even Democratic Unionist Party leader Ian Paisley condemned the killing as "a diabolical crime showing devilish viciousness" such was the lack of knowledge about Casey's IRA membership. The Conflict Archive on the Internet states that Casey was killed by the Ulster Volunteer Force (UVF) rather than the UDA.

Casey's brother Liam, also a member of the IRA, had been killed in a car accident two years previously in 1987.

Sinn Féin have called for a full and independent investigation into his death.

In 2005 Gerard Casey's wife Una and the relatives of other murdered Irish republicans criticised Social Democratic and Labour Party (SDLP) member John Dallat for not condemning the murders at the time but later raising them for political benefit. Dallat responded by saying he condemned all murders.

Soon after coming to office in 2010 Attorney General for Northern Ireland John Larkin ordered a new inquest into Casey's death.

The fact that Casey's IRA membership had not been well-known led to the suggestions that the security forces had passed on information about his membership to the loyalists. Casey's relatives maintained that there was RUC collusion with those who killed Casey, and no-one has been charged with his murder. The 2022 report by the Police Ombudsman for Northern Ireland regarding the investigation into some of the murders committed by loyalist paramilitary groups found that there were instances where reports of RUC and Ulster Defence Regiment (UDR) members passing intelligence to loyalist paramilitaries were largely disregarded. Casey said before his death that his life had been threatened by the RUC. The Ombudsman report also stated that in November 1989, a cache of documentation on several hundred Sinn Féin and suspected Provisional IRA members was found in the possession of an individual with links to the UDA/UFF. Casey's information was found in this cache.
