= Kenneth J. Casey =

American real estate investor (died 2020)

Kenneth J. Casey (died May 6, 2020) was a Novato, California, real estate investor and member of the Marin County Human Rights Commission, charged in 2020 with "operating a massive Ponzi scheme" that defrauded "more than a thousand investors" while "embezzling tens of millions of dollars to personally enrich himself". Companies owned by him were investigated by the U.S. Securities and Exchange Commission (SEC), after attorneys said they had "engaged in serious misconduct over the nearly three decades prior to his death".

== Personal life ==
Casey was raised in Queens, New York, moving to Marin County in 1975. He played soccer when young and was an outdoorsman later in life, making a dog sled expedition to the North Pole. He married Charlene Albanese and "is survived by his son, Michael Albanese". The San Francisco Chronicle reported the couple divorced in 1996. A 2011 interview of Albanese for a magazine feature about their home stated that “Charlene and her husband, Ken Casey” purchased a second home in 2003. He died in May 2020, at the age of 73 of a heart attack.

== Business ==
Casey became a certified public accountant (CPA) in 1977. He operated Kenneth J. Casey, An Accountancy Corp., until his CPA certificate was revoked in 1998 after he was convicted in 1997 of felony violations for fraud and tax evasion. He served 18 months in prison for "21 counts of bank fraud, five counts of tax evasion, five counts of filing false income tax returns and one count of conspiracy to defraud the United States", according to the Point Reyes Light.

Casey obtained a business license in 1983 and founded Professional Investors Security Fund Inc. (PISF Inc.) based in Ignacio, California. He described PISF Inc. as "a personal corporation that I have owned since the early 1980s that I use for my own personal business reasons". Since 1990, he also owned Professional Financial Investors (PFI Inc.), based in Novato, which managed more than "740 apartment units and over 600,000 square feet of commercial warehouse and office suites", according to its website. A Marin County Supervisor said he was the largest owner of commercial properties in the county. The company website claimed over 1,500 investors, and many investors were not aware of Casey's past felonies.

=== SEC investigation ===
After Casey's death, Charlene Albanese—the beneficiary of Casey's estate—hired the law firm Ragghianti Freitas to help with the ownership transition. An audit raised "legitimate questions involving the structure and investment history of Mr. Casey's companies", according to partner of the law firm, and the SEC was asked to investigate. The SEC's "non-public, fact-finding inquiry" began on May 28, 2020; Michael Hogan was enlisted as the chief restructuring officer, hired by the law firm retained by Albanese. Albanese became active director during the transition, making $11,000 every two weeks and the North Bay Business Journal reported "some involved with the proceedings not knowing what she was doing for that salary, Hogan indicated". CFO Manuel Romero resigned from the board, "as did real estate investor Lewis Wallach as president". Lewis Wallach was CEO since 1998, having been promoted after joining the company in 1990 as a bookkeeper.

Hogan described the company operations as a "Ponzi scheme-like operation", saying new investments "were used to service the debt owed to existing investors and to personally enrich Mr. Casey himself". Writing in the Marin Independent Journal (Marin IJ), Dick Spotswood called it the largest financial scandal in the history of Marin County. More than a thousand individuals had their investments "co-mingled with potential ill-gotten gains", according to Hogan. The investigation revealed that 20% of PFI properties had no equity.

As of October 2020, the SEC investigation continues, and the possibility of other individuals being charged remains.

=== Bankruptcy ===
In July 2020, PFI Inc. and PISF Inc. filed for Chapter 11 bankruptcy. The estimated value as of July 2020 of properties owned by the companies was $550 million, and the companies owed about $650 million. Hogan stated that the investors would be best served by pursuing bankruptcy. In December 2021, 60 out of the more than 70 properties owned by PFI and PISF were sold for $436.5 million.

=== Criminal and civil charges ===
Wallach and Casey were charged as a co-conspirators on September 30, 2020, in a "massive Ponzi scheme", with the SEC and the U.S. Attorney's Office alleging they "intentionally defrauded 1,300 individuals". The Marin IJ's Will Houston reported that the SEC stated that both Wallach and Casey had assured investors when the COVID-19 pandemic began that "the company was financially secure because it had large cash reserves, lines of credit and the 'ability to sell properties owned'." Wallach was "charged with embezzling $26 million ... and using the money to buy personal items such as a Malibu vacation home and luxury cars," according to Houston. The SEC alleges that Wallach knew the company was not financially secure at the time he told investors it was. Following an investigation also conducted by the FBI, the complaint alleges that Wallach and Casey knew since at least 2015 that they would be unable to pay investors from revenues, but that information was not shared with investors.

Wallach's attorney, Ed Swanson, responded that Wallach was cooperating with the investigation, and would plead guilty to the criminal charges, having already pled guilty to civil charges. For each offense, a 20-year prison sentence could be imposed; a hearing is scheduled for December 28, 2020, and it remains to be determined as of October 2020 whether any ill-gotten gains will be repaid.

== Community involvement ==
Casey was one of Marin County's longest-serving members of the Human Rights Commission, serving from 2015 until his death. He was a benefactor for Burt's Children Center in San Francisco. He was a founder of NextGenMarin, which was described by the Marin IJ as a "housing, business and community thank tank for college students and young activists". Spotswood stated that Burt's Children Center had closed in 2010, and that "NextGen Marin was mostly a housing advocacy online presence".

Casey was a donor to charitable and theatre causes, and political candidates. PISF Inc. donated $300,000 towards a California state gas tax repeal in 2017—funds which were then used by Travis Allen in his campaign for governor, according to the Marin IJ. Casey, Albanese, and Wallach also donated the maximum allowed by law to Allen's campaign. Casey, Albanese, Wallach and other PFI or PISF employees had earlier donated to similar political candidates. Responding to charges that the company may be reimbursing employees for maximum contributions, Casey stated, "Nobody is getting reimbursed for anything."
