= Mike Casey (entrepreneur) =

New Zealand businessman and electrification advocate

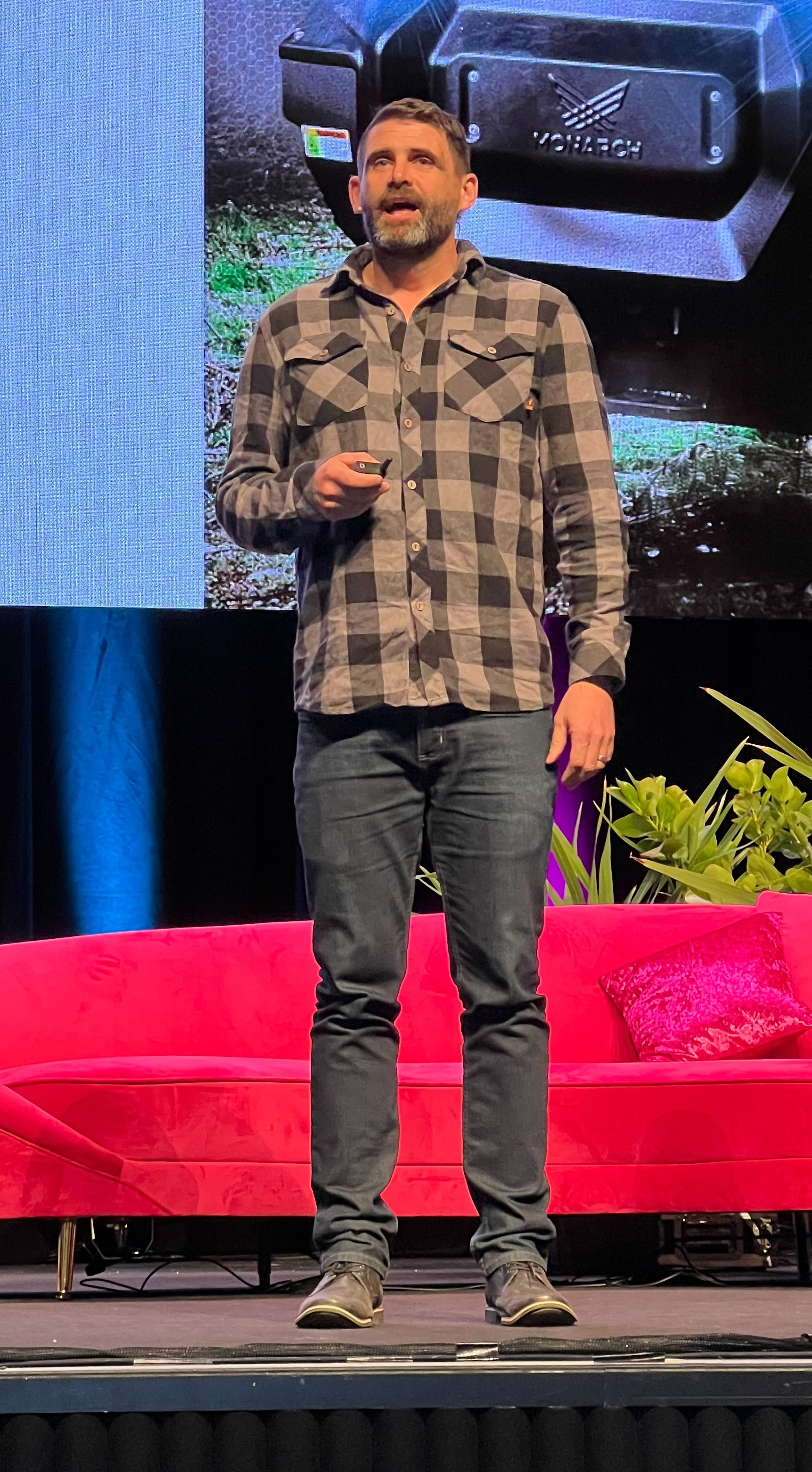
- Casey presenting at Canterbury Tech Summit 2024
- Occupations: orchardist, electrification advocate

Mike Casey is a New Zealand entrepreneur, software developer, cherry orchardist and electrification advocate.

After moving to Sydney in 2008, Casey was a co-founder of GradConnection, a software platform that connects recent tertiary graduates with jobs. In 2019, GradConnection was sold to recruitment and jobs classifieds service SEEK.

After the sale of GradConnection, Casey moved back to New Zealand with his family and founded Forest Lodge Orchard. The orchard grows cherries near Cromwell in Central Otago. The orchard is entirely electrified and uses no fossil fuels. Electrifying the orchard operation included New Zealand's first electric frost fans, deployment of 100 kW (130 hp) of solar power generation and a 300 kWh (1,100 MJ) battery energy storage system, and purchase of only electric farm vehicles and power tools.

Casey helped to create a certification called New Zealand Zer0 administered by AsureQuality, which certifies that a business does not use any fossil fuels in their operation. The certification does not allow the use of carbon offsets and credits by a business to claim they have net zero emissions.

Casey is the CEO of Rewiring Aotearoa, a charity that advocates for the complete electrification of New Zealand.
