= Casey =

Casey may refer to:

== Places ==
=== Antarctica ===
- Casey Station
- Casey Range

=== Australia ===
- Casey, Australian Capital Territory
- City of Casey, Melbourne
- Division of Casey, electoral district for the House of Representatives

=== Canada ===
- Casey, Ontario
- Casey, Quebec, a village - see Casey Emergency Airstrip

=== United States ===
- Casey, Illinois, a city
- Casey, Iowa, a city
- Casey County, Kentucky
- Casey, Wisconsin, a town

== People and fictional characters ==
- Casey (given name)
- Casey (surname)

== Other uses ==
- Casey (band), hardcore punk from South Wales
- "Casey" (song), a 2008 song by Darren Hayes
- Casey (typeface), a sans-serif typeface developed by the Kowloon-Canton Railway Corporation for use in its railway system
- Planned Parenthood v. Casey, 1992 U.S. Supreme Court decision that upheld limited abortion rights
- Casey's, a general store chain

== See also ==
- Cayce (disambiguation)
- Keysi
- O'Casey (surname)
- CACI, a multinational professional services and information technology company
- KC (disambiguation)
