= 1994 Australia Day Honours =

The 1994 Australia Day Honours are appointments to various orders and honours to recognise and reward good works by Australian citizens. The list was announced on 26 January 1994 by the Governor General of Australia, Bill Hayden.

The Australia Day Honours are the first of the two major annual honours lists, the first announced to coincide with Australia Day (26 January), with the other being the Queen's Birthday Honours, which are announced on the second Monday in June.

† indicates an award given posthumously.

== Order of Australia ==
=== Companion (AC) ===
==== General Division ====
Recipient	Citation	Notes
The Honourable Keith John Austin Asche	For service to the law, to tertiary education and to the community, particularly the people of the Northern Territory	
General Eva Evelyn Burrows, AO	For service to the temporal and spiritual welfare of the community and to social justice as the world leader of the Salvation Army	
The Honourable Sir Guy Stephen Montague Green, CVO KBE	For service to the law, to the community and to education	
Dr James Peacock	For service to science, particularly in the field of molecular biology and to science education	
Emeritus Professor Thomas Smith Reeve, CBE	For service to medicine and to academic and clinical surgery, particularly in the field of endocrinology	
Professor Graeme Bruce Ryan	For service to science and to higher education, particularly in the fields of medical research and medical education	
Noel John Tanzer	For service to public sector reform, particularly through the commercialisation of Government enterprises, to the development of social welfare policies and to the community	

==== Military Division ====
Recipient	Citation	Notes
Lieutenant General John Murray Sanderson, AO	For eminent service and exceptional performance of duty to the Australian Defence Force, particularly as the Commander United Nations Transitional Authority in Cambodia	

=== Officer (AO) ===
==== General Division ====
Recipient	Citation	Notes
Patricia Jean Adam-Smith, OBE	For service to community history, particularly through the preservation of national traditions and folklore and recording of oral histories	
Dr John Henry Calaby	For service to science, particularly in the fields of zoology and ecology and to Australian mammalogy	
John Craig Conde	For service to business and commerce, particularly in the field of electricity generation and supply to the community	
Emeritus Professor William Alexander Crammond, OBE	For service to mental health care reform, to clinical psychiatry and to academic administration	
Associate Professor Lorraine Dennerstein	For service to medical education and medical research, particularly in relation to women's health issues	
Sister Angela Mary Doyle	For service to hospital administration, to community health and to teaching health care services	
Professor Raymund Marshall Golding	For service to science and to university administration.	
The Honourable Harold Norman Holgate	For service to the Tasmanian Parliament	
Robert Henry Johnston	For service to manufacturing particularly in relation to the automotive industry	
Associate Professor Elliott Frank Johnston, QC	For service to the law, legal education and to the community	
Alderman Lorna Doone Pleasance Kennedy	For service to local government and the community	
Gabrielle Kibble	For service to urban and regional development and planning	
Donald Gordon Mackay	For service to law and to commerce	
Professor Barrie Patrick Marmion	For service to medical research, particularly in the field of virology	
Lorraine Margaret Martin	For service to business and commerce, particularly in the field of education and training	
Professor Graeme Max Neutze	For service to education, particularly in the field of urban research	
Dr John Pryde Paterson	For service to public administration, particularly water policy reform, and to the development and provision of social welfare services	
Dr Colin Pearson, MBE	For service to conservation, particularly in relation to historical artefacts	
Alan Douglas Rose	For service to public administration, particularly through service to the Attorney-General's Department	
Professor Ian Gordon Ross	For service to science, particularly in the fields of research teaching and administration	
Dr Boyne Marie Russell	For service to medicine and community health, particularly in relation to the care of aged people	
Donald Neil Sanders, CB	For service to finance and banking	
Professor Cheryl Anne Saunders	For service to the law and to public administration	
Dr Marian Sawer	For service to women and to political science	
Dr Norman Barnett Tindale	For service to anthropology, particularly through the study of traditional Aboriginal society	
Professor John Atherton Young	For service to medical science, particularly in the field of physiology	

==== Military Division ====
None awarded

=== Member (AM) ===
==== General Division ====
Recipient	Citation	Notes
Yvette Fay Amer, OAM	For service to the community, particularly the Crippled Children's Association of South Australia	
James Leslie Anderson	For service to industry and commerce, the arts and the community	
Thomas William Carlyon Angove	For service to the Australian wine and brandy industry	
Dr Dorothy Howard Broom	For service to women and women's health	
Emeritus Professor Tasman Brown	For service to dental research and post-graduate dental education	
Dr David Barrington Brownbill	For service to medicine in the area of stroke research	
Associate Professor Graham George Clunies-Ross	For service to education, particularly through early intervention programmes for young children with intellectual and physical disabilities	
Stanley Milton Collins	For service to the timber industry	
Associate Professor William Bruce Conolly	For service to medicine, particularly hand surgery	
The Honourable Margaret June Craig	For service to the community, particularly as National President of Save the Children Fund and to the Western Australian parliament	
Gordon Frederick Craig, OBE	For service to local government and to urban development	
Ivan Edwin Cribb	For service to the visually impaired, particularly through the Royal Guide Dog Association and the Royal Blind Society	
Michael Crosby	For service to the entertainment industry	
Dr Kevin John Cullen	For service to medicine, particularly in the Busselton region and to the wine industry	
Dr Victor Henry Cumberland	For service to medicine, particularly surgery and forensic science	
Norman Walter Daniel	For service to blind sport as a competitor and administrator	
Michael Steven Diamond, MBE	For service to the Greek community	
Trevor Raymond Eastwood	For service to business and industry as Managing Director of Wesfarmers and to the community	
Peter Evans	For service as Chairman of the Waterfront Industry Reform Authority	
Graeme Alexander Ewer	For service to the community and to opera	
Penelope Jill Figgis	For service to the environment and conservation	
Sylvia Gwendoline Fisher	For service to the arts, particularly opera	
Emeritus Professor Harold Arthur Ford	For service to the law	
Dr Stanley Bryan Furnass	For service to health education and promotion	
Anthony Gerald Gould	For service to the performing arts, particularly as Director of the Performing Arts Complex, Brisbane	
Sister Patricia Annette Grantham	For service to nursing administration	
The Honourable William Leonard Grayden	For service to the Western Australian parliament and to the community	
John Douglas Hampton	For service to international telecommunications	
Denis Michael Hanley	For service to business and to industrial research and development	
Harold Hanson	For service to tourism, particularly as the chairman of Tourism Wollongong	
Anthony Geoffrey Hartnell	For public service, particularly to the Australian Securities Commission	
William Charles Roy Harvey	For service to local government and to the community	
Colin Sidney Hayes, OBE	For service in the field of industrial relations	
Thomas Henry Hoad	For service to sport, particularly water polo	
Colin Leslie James	For service to architecture and to the community	
Graham Ivor Jenkinson	For service to the community, particularly through organising the 50th anniversary commemoration of the Battle of the Coral Sea, and to the Greening Townsville Committee	
Joan Heather Johnson	For service to aged people, particularly through the NSW Council on the Ageing	
Dr Robert Harry Johnson	For service to veterinary science, particularly in the fields of microbiology and virology	
David Campbell Jones, OBE	For service to the community	
Kandiah Kamalesvaran	For service to the entertainment industry and to the community	
Bruce Raymond Kean	For service to industry	
Colin Russell Leith, DFC	For service to the community, particularly aged people, and to the National Safety Council of Australia	
Richard Dutton Llewellyn	For service to people with disabilities	
James Peile Love	For service to the real estate and valuation profession and to the community	
Getano Belford Lui MBE	For service to the Torres Strait Islander community	
Heather Joy Martin	For service to special education and to people with disabilities	
John Anthony McDonald	For service to education, particularly in the areas of private and further education	
Thomas Arthur Albert McDonald	For service to industrial relations, particularly through the Building Workers' Industrial Union	
Ian Stewart McNamara	For service to the presentation and promotion of Australia's non-urban culture, through the radio programme Australia All Over	
The Very Reverend Father Anthony Francis McSweeney	For service to the community and to international relations, particularly as Superior-General of the Blessed Sacrament Congregation, Rome	
Malcolm Norman Meninga	For service to rugby league football	
Donald Mentz	For service to international relations, particularly as Director-General, Commonwealth Agricultural Bureau International	
Simon Richard Molesworth	For service to conservation and the environment and to the Victorian Branch of the National Trust of Australia	
Brian Moss	For service to the care of the aged, particularly persons suffering from Alzheimer's disease and related disorders	
Paul Murphy	For service to public broadcasting and to journalism	
Professor Ian Provan Murray	For service to medicine, particularly nuclear medicine	
Dr Bernard William Neal	For service to medicine, particularly paediatrics	
John Michael O'Dea	For service to the care of aged people, particularly through the North Sydney Retirement Trust and the James Milson Nursing Home	
Edward Colston Osgood	For service to aviation in the Northern Territory	
Sandra Parsonage	For service to the Spastic Centre of New South Wales through the Grevillea Group	
Claude Alan Patching	For service to gliding	
William John Patterson	For service to industrial relations, particularly through the Meat and Allied Trades Association	
Ira John Pendrigh	For service to the Australian wine industry	
Professor Susan Margaret Pond	For service to clinical pharmacology and toxicology	
Howard William Powell	For service to business and to the information technology industry	
Walter Rose Riddell	For service to the Cystic Fibrosis Association	
Mavis June Moten Robertson	For service to the superannuation industry and to peace and disarmament	
Dr Peter Mather Robinson	For service to industrial development, particularly in the area of materials technology through research and development	
Edward Trevor Robinson	For service to the information technology industry	
Jeffrey Milton Rushton	For service to the broadcasting industry	
Trevor Reginald Russell	For service to accountancy and to public administration	
William Hurtle Schmitt	For service to veterans, particularly through the Prisoners of War Association	
Noel Julian Semmens	For service to tourism in Western Australia	
Brother Paul Terence Smith	For service to young people, particularly through Boys Town and Kids Help Line	
Dr Gordon Donald Spearritt	For service to music	
Emeritus Professor Donald Spearritt	For service to education	
Timothy Austin Storrier	For service to contemporary art	
Robert Kellar Todd	For service to administrative law	
Major General Douglas Vincent, CB OBE (Rtd)	For service to the ex-service community, particularly as defence adviser to the Returned and Services League	
Associate Professor Phyllis Joan Watson	For service to medical records administration	
Emeritus Professor Douglas John Whalan	For service to the law and to parliament, particularly as a parliamentary legal adviser	
Robin Jane Wilkinson	For service to people with disabilities	
Dorothy Agnes Woolley	For service to the Girl Guides Association	
Neville Clarence Young	For service to business and to the promotion of technological development	

==== Military Division ====
Branch	Recipient	Citation	Notes
Navy	Commodore Christopher Alexander Barrie	For service to the Royal Australian Navy, particularly as Deputy Maritime Commander and Chief of Staff, Maritime HQ	
Navy	Commodore Michael Thomas Dunne	For service to the Royal Australian Navy, particularly as Director-General Force Development (Sea)	
Navy	Captain Keith John Jordon	For extraordinary dedication and service to the Royal Australian Navy, particularly as the Naval Attaché, Jakarta	
Army	Lieutenant Colonel Mark Evans	For service to the Australian Army, particularly as Brigade Major of the 3rd Brigade and CO of the 6th Battalion, The Royal Australian Regiment	
Army	Colonel Coralie Margaret Gerrard	For service to the Australian Army in the field of nursing management and practice	
Army	Captain John Shaddock Gibson	For service to the Australian Army, particularly in the field of stores management at 1st Recruit Training Battalion	
Army	Colonel Geoffrey Norman Pearce	For outstanding service to the Australian Army, particularly as the Commander Land Command Engineers	
Army	Major Stephen Frank Reid	For exceptional service to the Australian Army, particularly as the Chief Instructor, Warrant Officer and Non Commissioned Officers Wing of the Land Warfare Centre, Canungra	
Army	Lieutenant Colonel Martin Charles Studdert	For outstanding service to the Australian Army in the field of communications at Land Headquarters and with the Force Communications Unit, United Nations Transitional Authority in Cambodia	
Army	Colonel John Malcolm Toyne	For exceptional service to the Australian Army, particularly as the Commanding Officer 2nd/3rd Field Engineer Regiment and as Operations Staff Officer with Headquarters 1st Division	
Army	Lieutenant Colonel Jennifer Ann Watkins	For outstanding service to the Australian Army, particularly as the Commanding Officer Broadmeadows Logistic Battalion	
Air Force	Group Captain Peter John Criss	For outstanding service to the Royal Australian Air Force, particularly as the Officer Commanding 82 Wing	
Air Force	Squadron Leader Gregory John Evans	For service to the Royal Australian Air Force, particularly as Operations Flight Commander No 36 Squadron	
Air Force	Air Commodore Graham Ralph Giles	For service to the Royal Australian Air Force, particularly as the Director-General of Logistics Operations Headquarters Logistic Command	
Air Force	Wing Commander Norman Ross Watt	For outstanding service to the Royal Australian Air Force as the Commanding Officer No 501 Aircraft Maintenance Squadron	

=== Medal (OAM) ===
==== General Division ====
Recipient	Citation	Notes
Giuseppe Adamo	For service to the Italian community	
Stephanie Ann Alexander	For services to the hospitality and the tourist industry and to the encouragement of apprentices	
Harold Frank Anderson	For service to the community, particularly shipping and transport	
Garth Bennett Andrews	For service to the community, particularly through the surf-lifesaving movement	
Edna May Anstis	For service to the community	
Janis Atrens	For service to the Latvian community	
Gail Austen	For service to youth	
Helen Joan Baber	For service to the community, particularly through organisations for people with disabilities	
Chief Petty Officer Harold Leslie Bailey	For service to the community and to veterans	
Alexander William Bathgate	For service to arts administration, particularly through the Marion Street Theatre	
Richard William Bayly	For service to community music	
Detective Sergeant John Bowering Bean	For service to the youth, particularly in the area of child protection	
Edna Constance Becker	For service to the community	
William George Belcher	For service to community music, particularly band music	
Clive John Berghofer	For service to local government and to the community	
Peter James Bermingham	For service to surf lifesaving	
Glenroy Garfield Best	For service to the fruit and vegetable growing industry	
Harold Edwin Bird	For service to the National Boys Choir	
Percy Brian Blandford	For service to the Australian meat and livestock industry	
Arthur James Blizzard	For service to motor cycle sport	
Mavis Bock	For service to the community	
Heather Birt Bonnin	For service to the arts, particularly through the Art Gallery of South Australia	
Antony Gerard Booth	For service to track and field athletics	
Slavko James Bosnjak		
Doris Ellen Boyle	For service to the hearing impaired	
John Brown	For service to the community and veterans	
Major George Brown	For service to the community and veterans	
Maria Brzezinski	For service to the Polish community	
Dr Terence Aubrey Bunn	For service to medicine and to the community	
George Burlinson	For service to animal welfare	
Elaine Heather Bussenschutt	For service to the community	
Valda Else Byth	For service to women, particularly through the Women's Electoral Lobby	
Priscilla Maurine Callard	For service to the community and nursing	
William Reginald Cameron	For service to the performing arts and to arts administration	
Douglas Frederick Campbell, QGM	For service to community health	
Dorothy Jean Campton	For service to youth, particularly to those with disabilities	
Ian Campbell Gordon Carpenter	For service to the community of Orange, particularly through service clubs and organisations	
Tommy Francis Carter	For service to the community	
Russell John Carvolth	For service to community health, particularly in the field of drug and alcohol prevention	
Lorna May Charles	For service to education	
Barry John Cheales	For service to the sport of gymnastics	
Beryl May Chilton	For service to further education, particularly in the field of youth and adult training programmes	
Andrew Christou	For service to the Greek community and to the trade union movement	
John Douglas Clarke	For service to the sport of lawn bowls	
Ernest Patrick Clarke	For service to social welfare	
Thomas Ernest Cole	For service to community history	
Margaret Dorothy Colebrook	For service to children with hearing impairments	
Robert George Cooper	For service to music and music education	
Lisa Gaye Curry-Kenny, MBE	For service to the sport of swimming	
Jeanette Gertrude Curtis	For service as a foster parent to improving the quality of life for children with severe and multiple disabilities	
Valerie Mae Davis	For service to children, particularly through 'Programme Two', St Kilda	
Ethel Ann Deagan	For service to the physical and emotional care of people with disabilities through Kaddy Transport, Dee Why	
Lieto Elia Donadelli	For service to the sugar industry and to the community	
Stanley Clifford Donald	For service to the hearing impaired	
Ian Keith McDowall Downie	For service to the community and local government	
Roma Ward Drummond	For service to families caring for relatives with schizophrenia	
Ida Winefred Duncan	For service to the community, particularly as Secretary of the 'Friends of the Botanical Gardens', Noosa Heads	
Councillor Allan Albert Dunstan, OBE	For service to local government and to the community	
Ellanor Durbridge	For service to conservation on Stradbroke Island	
Jack Beaumont Earl	For service to yachting and to marine art	
Cynthia Beauchamp Edwards	For service to the Australian printing and publishing industry	
Eric Edwards	For service to the Australian printing and publishing industry	
Laurence Edward Elliott	For service to youth as founder of the Far North Queensland Youth Assistance Fund	
Douglas Raymond Ellis	For service to sport and recreation and to Australian university sports associations	
Vera Ethel Evans	For service to the community	
Albert Cyril Fairchild	For service to the scout movement	
Lesley Yvonne Falloon	For service to the community and to local government	
Joan Evelyn Fenton	For service to recording the history of the Central Coast region of NSW	
Gordon Karl Fetterplace	For service to the community and to local government	
William Harold Fife	For service to local government and to the RSL Wagga Wagga Sub-Branch	
Dulcie Flower	For service to the community, particularly on the area of Aboriginal health worker training	
Lorna Margaret Flux	For service to the child care movement and to child care licensing guidelines	
Anthony Thomas Foley	For service to the community and to local government	
Warwick Ian Forbes	For service to the sport of gymnastics	
Kevin Gregory Ford	For service to education and to the community	
The Honourable Norman Kenneth Foster	For service to parliament, the trade union movement and to ex-service organisations	
Kevin Russell French	For service to the forest products industry, particularly in the area of marketing and promotion	
Ruth Pauline Frith	For service to athletics	
Pastor Frank Clive Fullwood	For service to the community through Questcare, Ipswich	
Amy Gavin	For service to the community	
Max Germaine	For service to the promotion of the arts and artists	
Mary Lorraine Gibbs	For service to the community	
Charles Philip Gilbert	For service to the blind and visually impaired	
Hazel Joy Gilby	For service to the community and to the Red Cross	
Charles Sidney Giott	For service to Local Government and the community	
Joan Beatrice Golding	For service to people with the HIV/AIDS virus and to their families through the People Living with Aids programme	
Desmond Gooch	For service to the Tasmanian probation and parole service particularly through administering the community service orders programme	
Mary Good	For service to public health and to the community	
Gwendoline Mavis Good	For service to the community	
Judith Ann Gover	For service to nursing, particularly in the field of vascular ultrasound	
Margaret Joyce Grant	For service to secondary education	
Eunice Glenelg Grimaldo	For service to international relations, particularly as president of the Australia-New Zealand Society of New York	
Richard Allen Guy	For service to the cold storage industry	
Ethel May Guy	For service to the community	
Margaret Hall	For service to women's cricket in the Australian Capital Territory	
Maureen Elizabeth Hall	For service to community health and to improving the standard of Aboriginal health care on the far south coast of New South Wales	
Muriel Fairbairn Hamlyn-Harris	For service to the community, particularly through the Ecumenical Coffee Brigade	
Margaretha Anna Hanen	For service to the provision of aged care programmes for people from non-English speaking backgrounds	
Mary Rueben Hargrave	For service to local government and to the community	
Elsie Hargreaves	For service to the community, particularly through the Ladies Auxiliary of the Totally and Permanently Disabled Soldiers' Association	
Mervyn Edward Hart	For service to the community	
Noeline Hartley	For service to the community in the areas of women's health and childcare policies, and to the environment and peace movements	
Father Brian Matthew Healy	For service to the community through the Catholic Diocese of Darwin	
John Anthony Heffernan	For service to the community through the provision of legal aid services in Victoria	
Gwenyth Bevan Heinz	For service to the community, particularly in relation to the support and protection of youth at risk	
Paul Warren Henry	For service to people undergoing drug and alcohol rehabilitation through the We Help Ourselves (WHO) organisation	
Joan Herraman	For service to the community	
Ivy Mary Hewitt	For service to the National Science and Technology Centre	
Ronald Ernest Hewitt	For service to the National Science and Technology Centre	
Jean Hibberd	For service to children with disabilities, particularly through the scout association and to the community	
Bruce Samuel Hick	For service to rowing	
William Alexander Higgie	For service to refugee resettlement through Austcare	
Eugenia Hill	For service to the promotion of multiculturalism in the arts	
Ronda Florence Hoare	For service to the Royal Adelaide Hospital Auxiliary	
Heather Joyce Hoffman	For service to St Matthew's Child-care Centre, Rockhampton	
Roy William Hosey	For service to the arts as a dance teacher and choreographer	
Clifford William Houghton	For service to motor vehicle traders and to Australian Rules football	
Dr Mary Neville Hughes	For services to medicine	
Mona Humphreys	For service to the community, particularly through the Chatswood division of Legacy	
Jack Edward Ireland	For service to local government and to the community	
Jean de Courtenay Isherwood	For service to the arts as a painter in oils and watercolours	
Arthur William James	For service to the support to jazz music	
Ian David Jay	For service to civil engineering, particularly through the development of the Expo '88/South Bank Parklands projects	
Shirley Estelle Johnston	For service to the community.	
Arnold Wicks Johnston	For service to community health, particularly through the Epilepsy Association of Australia.	
Emrys Morris Jones	For service to the Ipswich Hospital Board and to the community.	
David Robert Kennedy	For service to the community.	
Robert Rawdon Kennedy	For service to the print media, radio and television.	
Sister Margaret Mary Kennedy	For service to education as principal of Genazzano College.	
Florence Elizabeth Kennedy	For service to the Torres Strait Islander community.	
Herbert Clement Kentish	For service to local government and to the community.	
John Eliott Kilpatrick	For service to the community and to local government.	
Iris Maureen King	For service to the Girl Guides Association, to the Southern Districts Horticultural Society and to aviculture.	
Malcolm James Kinross	For service to the community, particularly through the United Grand Lodge of Queensland and to the care of aged people	
Norman Alfred Klatt	For service to aged people through the Nundah Zion Lutheran Home and to the community	
Christian Charles William Kohlhoff	For service to the community, particularly in providing facilities for aged people and people with disabilities	
Robin John Langley	For service to performing arts, cultural and sporting organisations	
Terry Lavender	For service to the community through the development of walking trails, particularly the Heysen Trail	
Harold Sydney Le Bherz	For service to horse sports	
Dr David Norrie Fleming Leake	For service to medicine as an ear, nose and throat surgeon and to Poll Hereford cattle breeding	
Wellington Lee, OBE RFD	For service to the community, particularly the Chinese community	
Wilfred Edwin Lehmann	For service to the performing arts as a violinist, composer and conductor	
Ivor Lewis	For service to the community, particularly through the Glenelg Rotary Club	
Eric Yuen-Ying Liao	For service to the Buddhist community	
John Lorenzo Linard	For service to the community, particularly aged people, through the Society of St Vincent de Paul	
Mae Olive Lingard	For service to aged people through the Miranda Returned and Services League's Captain Cook Daycare Club	
Jean Forsyth London	For service to Scottish country dancing	
Councillor Dominic Joseph Lopez	For service to local government	
Clarence Edward Lowe	For service to veterans	
Brian John Mackander	For service to the community	
Margaret Patricia Mallon	For service to the community through Meals on Wheels	
Gloria Edith Mangan	For service to judo	
Zelma Coralie Manning	For service to the community, particularly through the Australian Red Cross Society	
Clive Hunter Mansell	For service to people with intellectual disabilities	
Garth Lawrence Mansfield	For service to church music	
Alexander Francis Marinos	For service to the performing arts as an actor, director and writer	
Robert Jeffrey Mathews	For service to the control of chemical weapons	
Nancy Edith Mattinson	For service to the arts through music	
Beverley Margaret McAlister	For service to the community, particularly through the Dandenong Ranges Music Council	
Adeline Emma McBryde	For service to youth, particularly through the Girl Guides Association of Queensland and to the community	
Stephen Walter McDougal	For service to veterans through the New South Wales 2/3 Field Regiment Association	
Adrian Gardner McEwin	For service to the life insurance industry and to the community	
Gwenneth Frances McFarquhar	For service to youth, particularly through the Girl Guides Association and the Duke of Edinburgh's Award Scheme	
Carol McGhee	For service to people with hearing impairments through Better Hearing Australia, Tasmanian branch	
Noel Robert McGregor	For service to the Showmen's Guild of Australasia, and to regional festivals in Queensland	
John Charles McKie	For service to Rugby League football as a referee	
Thomas Francis Mead	For service to journalism and to the community	
Dr Roger John Mecoy	For service to respiratory medicine and to the Asthma Foundation of Tasmania	
Alexander Metropolis	For service to youth through the Samaritan Befrienders	
Leslie Robert Milliken	For service to primary industry, to merino sheep breeding and to the community	
Sister Margaret Patricia Mines	For service to the community as a palliative carer working particularly with people suffering from the HIV/AIDS virus	
Jennifer Elizabeth Mitchell	For service to the community, particularly through the Country Women's Association of Australia	
Dugald Scott Mitchell	For service to the life insurance industry and to the community	
Freda Meryl Moore	For service to the community through music	
Marjorie Jean Morgan	For service to the Victorian School for Deaf Children and to community history	
Dorothy Letitia Morrison	For service to the Essendon Auxiliary of the Helping Hand Association for the Intellectually Disabled of Coburg and Districts, Inc.	
Francis Anthony Mullins	For service to the community through the Society of St Vincent de Paul, Matthew Talbot soup van	
Joan Margaret Munro	For service to the community, particularly through the Canberra Senior Citizens Club and to the National Council of Women of the Australian Capital Territory	
Reverend Father John Joseph Murphy	For service to the community as Director of the Catholic Immigration Office, Victoria	
Kevin James Murray	For service to aged people	
Reverend Father Hugh Edward Murray	For service to people with HIV/AIDS virus and their families	
Jacob George Mye, MBE	For service to the Torres Strait Islanders community	
Ralph Percival Neale	For service to conservation of the environment and to landscape architecture	
James Julian Nevin	For service to cycling	
Jeffrey William Newman	For service to charities and fund raising	
Helen Catherine Noble	For service to dance education	
Barry James O'Neil	For service as chief executive officer of the Australian Dental Association (New South Wales)	
Claud Grenfell Odgers	For service to the community, particularly aged people	
Cynthia Mary Parker	For service to education, particularly as headmistress of Frensham School	
Jennie Hephzibah Parks	For service to music education	
Dr Howard John Peak	For service to medicine, particularly in the field of cardiology	
Marita Margaret Joy Pearson	For service to the community as a foster parent	
William Laidlaw Pearson	For service to the community as a foster parent	
Marjorie Joan Phillips	For service to people with intellectual disabilities, particularly through the Community Visitors Programme	
Dawson Robert Phipps	For service to local government and to the community	
William Harold Pitman	For service to people with sight impairments, particularly through the preparation of audio cassettes	
Joy Robin Poole	For service to polocrosse as a player, coach and umpire	
Dr Conrad James Primmer	For service to the community	
Martin Norfolk Punch	For service to youth, particularly through the organisation BUSY – Backing Unemployed Southport/Surfers Paradise Youth – and to the National Skillshare Association	
Owen Ronald Purdon	For service to veterans, particularly through the Naval Association of Australia	
Cuthbert Russell Raymond	For service to the North Perth Migrant Resource Centre and to the media	
Fay Redhead	For service to the community	
Pamela Joy Reece	For service as a foster parent to children with developmental disabilities	
Mae Elizabeth (Paula) Reid	For service to the Department of Forestry Library at the Australian National University	
John Colin Rhodes	For service to the United Protestant Association of New South Wales	
Mark Richards	For service to Surfing	
John Bertram Roberts, ISO MBE ED	For service to the National Trust of Australia (Western Australia)	
Arthur Francis Robertson	For service to the community	
Georgina Elizabeth Robertson	For service to the community	
Charles Anthony Milne Robertson	For service to local government, the aged and sports administration	
James Sandy Robertson	For service to ballroom dancing	
Gillian Rogers	For service to youth with intellectual disabilities, particularly through the Get Together Club	
Jessie May Russell	For service to the community	
William Anthony Rutkin	For service to community health, particularly in the field of HIV/AIDS	
Peggy Lorraine Ryan	For service to basketball	
Thomas James Ryan	For service to local government, to the Municipal Saleyards Association and to sport	
Rudolf Wilhelm Schuetze	For service to conservation and the environment	
Jean May Searle	For service to the United Hospitals Auxiliary, Macksville Branch	
John Cyril Selwood	For service to veterans	
Matron Gwenda Shaw	For service to nursing	
Eoin George Shearer	For service to fire safety, particularly through the Insurance Council of Australia and to the Australian Fire Protection Association	
John Norman Shearer	For service to the community and to primary industry	
Eve Sher, BEM	For service to the United Nations Association of Australia (Victorian Division) and to the community	
Peter Joseph Sheridan	For service to the State Emergency Service	
Isla Milne Shilton	For service to women, particularly through the Women's Agricultural Bureau, Sandalwood Branch and the Country Women's Association, Borrika Branch	
Bryan Harold Sidgreaves	For service to the Australian Shopfitters Association (New South Wales)	
William John Singleton	For service to surf lifesaving	
Colin Robert Slocombe	For service to community health, particularly through the Obsessive Compulsive Disorder (OCD) Support Group	
Jack Clive Smale	For service to the community	
Dr Robert Walter Smethills	For service to rugby union football and to sports medicine	
Mervyn Ashmore Smith	For service to the arts, to architecture and to town planning	
Thomas Anthony Spezzan	For service to the ex-service community	
Benzion Sternfeld	For service to the Jewish community and to sport, particularly through Maccabi Australia	
Nancy Elver Stewart	For service to children with disabilities	
Lucy Stirling	For service to women	
Pamela Mary Stone	For service to local government and to the community	
Richard LaMothe Stowell	For service to youth from isolated areas, particularly as director of Swanleigh	
Irene Myrtle Stringer	For service to the community, particularly through Meals on Wheels (Osborne)	
Carmel Edith Sullivan	For service to nursing and to international relations through the Department of Foreign Affairs and Trade	
Kay Elaine Sullivan	For service to the community through the provision of voluntary nursing and emergency medical care	
Ray Wilfred Sutton	For service to cricket	
Elizabeth Anne Swain	For service to music education as Director of Music at Newington College	
Kathleen Moira Tanks	For service to the community, particularly for service with the Society of St Vincent de Paul	
Olga Irene Thistlethwaite	For service to the Royal Far West Children's Health Scheme (Port Macquarie Branch)	
Virginia Gwendolen Thorley Phillips	For service as an author, counsellor and consultant on lactation and to the Nursing Mothers' Association	
Robert William Tobias	For service to the arts, particularly through the Cladan Cultural Exchange Institute of Australia and to the Sydney International Piano Competition	
Priscilla Ann Todd	For service to women, particularly through the Women's Electoral Lobby (WEL)	
Mary Elaine Tranter	For service to the community and to the Queensland Dairyfarmers' Organisation	
Frances Tree	For service to tourism and to the community	
Cecil Jack Tree	For service to tourism and to the community	
Lieutenant Commander Andrew John Tuft	For service to the Naval Reserve Cadets	
Herbert Stanley Tutt	For service to the Landsborough Historical Society and to the Wildlife Preservation Society of Queensland (Caloundra)	
Dr Harry Danvers Tyer	For service to medicine as an orthopaedic surgeon	
Royce Voss	For service to aged people	
Thea Mary Waddell	For service to the Art Gallery of New South Wales	
Marjorie Lydia Wane	For service as secretary/treasurer of the Bush Children's Education Foundation of New South Wales	
Florence Warren	For service to education	
James Rea Waters	For service to choral music and to the community	
Valma Watson	For service as a foster parent and as an advocate for disabled and disadvantaged children	
Nelly Eveline Weiss	For service to the Women's International Zionist Organisation, and to the Jewish Community	
Robert Welch	For service as a sports administrator	
Joyce Charlotte Whaley	For service to children with disabilities, particularly through the Uniting Church	
John Dwyer Whitehouse	For service to the Australian Water Polo Association and to surf lifesaving	
Neville Edward Williams	For service to education and to veterans	
Norman James Wilson	For service to local government and to the community	
Prue Elizabeth Wilson	For service to mental health	
Ian John Wilson	For service to aged people, particularly through the Wesley Mission	
Josephine Alice Woodgate	For service to the Australia Ballet	
James McAlpine Woolley	For service to the education and promotion of dental health and to the community	
Donald Neil Wray	For service to manufacturing	
Dr Herbert Clifford Wright	For service to veterans	
Councillor Robert James Yates	For service to local government and to the community	
Mayse Young	For service to the community	

==== Military Division ====
Branch	Recipient	Citation	Notes
Navy	Chief Petty Officer Karl Brenner	For service to the Royal Australian Navy, particularly with the Force Communications Unit in support of the United Nations Transitional Authority in Cambodia	
Navy	Chief Petty Officer Ian Joseph Peters	For outstanding dedication and service to the Royal Australian Navy, particularly in the area of ship operations	
Navy	Warrant Officer Larry Francis Russell	For exceptional service to the Royal Australian Navy, particularly in the field of aviation technical training	
Navy	Warrant Officer Kenneth Desmond Sinnamon	For exceptional service to the Royal Australian Navy, particularly in the field of personnel management	
Army	Sergeant Paul Francis Geraghty	For service to the Australian Army, particularly in the field of Army Reserve Catering at 41st Battalion, The Royal New South Wales Regiment	
Army	Warrant Officer Class Two Geoffrey Keith Hannah	For exceptional service to the Australian Army, particularly in the field of training at the Infantry Centre	
Army	Warrant Officer Class Two Stephen Hein	For exceptional service to the Australian Defence Force as Chief Clerk of the Australian Contingent and the 11-nation Multinational Force and Observers in the Sinai	
Army	Warrant Officer Class One John Andrew Lavery	For outstanding service to the Australian Army, particularly as Regimental Sergeant Major of 1st Aviation Regiment, Australian Army Aviation Corps	
Army	Warrant Officer Class One John Selmes	For outstanding service to the Australian Army, particularly as Regimental Sergeant Major, 1st Recruit Battalion	
Army	Sergeant David Patrick Wainwright	For exceptional service to the Australian Army, particularly in the fields of leadership and training with the 6th Battalion	
Army	Warrant Officer Class Two Paul Maxwell Weeks	For outstanding service to the Australian Army, particularly in the development of the Integrated Logistic Complex at Adelaide Logistic Battalion	
Air Force	Warrant Officer Kelvin Laurence Brown	For exceptional service to the Royal Australian Air Force, particularly as the Squadron Warrant Officer Base Squadron Williams	
Air Force	Warrant Officer Wayne Charles Buckton	For service to the Royal Australian Air Force, particularly as the Warrant Officer Engineer within the Tactical Fighter Group	
Air Force	Warrant Officer Anthony David Dorrell	For exceptional service to the Royal Australian Air Force, particularly in the Technical Trade Restructure Directorate of Air Force Office	
Air Force	Warrant Officer Keith Thomas Edward Starks	For outstanding service to the Royal Australian Air Force, particularly in the field of maintenance engineering analysis of ground-based technical equipment	

== Meritorious Service ==
=== Public Service Medal (PSM) ===
Public Service Medal ribbon

State/ Territory	Recipient	Citation	Notes
Fed.	Leone Jean Allen	In recognition of service to the public service	
Fed.	William James Blick		
Fed.	Rex Falls		
Fed.	Jean Lesley Hill	For outstanding public service.	
Fed.	Dr Mary Beatrice Hoyle	For outstanding public service as director of the Medical Unit in the Department of Foreign Affairs and Trade, particularly her concern for the medical welfare of Australian staff and families overseas	
Fed.	Lawrence Valentine Irvin	For outstanding service with the Queensland Public Service.	
Fed.	Leonard Jenkins	For outstanding service with the Commonwealth Government.	
Fed.	Dr Onko Tjerk Kingma	For outstanding public service.	
Fed.	Malcolm John Lancaster, RFD	Royal Australian Air Force	
Fed.	Peter Leslie Lidbetter		
Fed.	Donald Ross MacLeod		
Fed.	Mary Hannah McQuaid		
Fed.	Susan Lea Minter		
Fed.	Robert John Palfreyman		
Fed.	Keith James Quintal		
Fed.	Joan Bell White		
NSW	Donald Edward Keith Armitstead	In recognition of service to public service	
NSW	Walter William Baker	In recognition of service to the Public Service	
NSW	Douglas John McSullea		
NSW	Susan Jean Pearson		
NSW	Jack William Wilton	State Emergency Service	
NSW	Gregory John Woodburne		
VIC	Edward Vivian Barton		
VIC	Keith Geoffrey Bowen		
VIC	Geoffrey Maurice Dupuy		
VIC	Norman Grove, QFSM		
VIC	Graham Guy Hill	For outstanding service to government.	
VIC	Kenneth Terras Middleton		
VIC	John Francis Shaw		
VIC	Raymond Henry Way		
QLD	Desmond Ernest Boyland		
QLD	Dr Peter Golledge	For outstanding public service.	
QLD	Patricia Joyce Greenwood	For outstanding public service in the field of physiotherapy	
QLD	Robert Graham Hartley		
WA	Helen May Sullivan		
SA	Yvonne Cammiss		
SA	Denise Margaret Florence Latto		
SA	William Willis		
NT	Margaret Ann Doherty		
