= Women's Healthy Ageing Project =

Medical research project

- Type of project: Medical research
- Location: Australia
- Owner: University of Melbourne Faculty of Medicine, Dentistry and Health Sciences & Centre for Neuroscience at the Royal Melbourne Hospital
- Key people: Professor Cassandra Szoeke, Director & Principal Investigator Professor Lorraine Dennerstein, Chair Scientific Advisory Board Professor Philippe Lehert, Lead Statistician Professor John Hopper (scientist), Chair Scientific Advisory Board
- Established: 1990

The Women's Healthy Ageing Project (WHAP) is the longest ongoing medical research project examining the health of Australian women. Its landmark studies concern women's heart and brain health, a long-neglected area of specialised research.

It began in 1990 as a longitudinal study of more than 400 Australian-born women and has been recording health changes for 30 years, from midlife to later-life.

The study is run within the Healthy Ageing Program, a research group at the University of Melbourne School of Medicine, in collaboration with the Centre for Medical Research at the Royal Melbourne Hospital.

The Healthy Ageing Program consists of WHAP (1990); the WHAP Generations Study (2021), involving children of the original 1990 WHAP participants; and AgeHAPPY (Healthy Ageing Project Population Youth-Senior) (2018), an online health survey of more than 5,000 participants assessing the impact of lifestyle factors on health and ageing.

== History ==
The program was established in 1990 by leading women's health researcher and psychiatrist Lorraine Dennerstein, who initiated the study to address the lack of attention paid by Australian medical research to diseases women have. WHAP continues to address this issue as it persists in current epidemiological research, heightening awareness with regard to the progression of women through menopause and into ageing.

The project was initiated as a cohort study of more than 2,000 women in 1990. In 1992, the project commenced with the longitudinal followup of over 400 of the original participants. In its first decade, the WHAP was known as the Melbourne Women's Midlife Health Project (MWMHP).

The study's present director and principal investigator is Professor Cassandra Szoeke, a neurologist and researcher in the University of Melbourne School of Medicine. Professor Lorraine Dennerstein and Australian genetic epidemiologist Professor John Hopper serve on the Scientific Advisory Board. Professor Philippe Lehert, a scientist and researcher in mathematical statistics and biostatistics is the Lead Statistician.

WHAP 30th year follow-up assessments commenced in 2023..The University of Melbourne made the decision to close the Healthy Ageing Program including the WHAP study in 2023. WHAP recommenced at Monash University as part of the Women's Health Alliance in late 2024.

== Research ==
WHAP aims to identify modifiable midlife risk factors for the development of diseases in later life, improve understanding of the development of age-related chronic diseases, and carry out early disease identification using clinical, biomarker and health risk factors.

With more than 30 years of longitudinal follow up, re-assessing each participant every four years, the study is distinct from other longitudinal datasets in Australia. It maintains a detailed, individualised biobank (including individual DNA and RNA data), imaging database (BMD, XR, MRI, fMRI & Amyloid PET) and physical, in-person measures including biomarkers, clinical assessments, and biometrics. From 1990 to date, the study has built a substantial database of measures such as mood, full neuropsychiatric batteries, dietary intake, physical activity and social connectedness. Together, these individualised datasets allow WHAP to identify patterns and trends across a lifespan and ultimately improve the wellbeing of women in the second half of their lives.

Throughout the lifetime of the project, it has published more than 150 peer-reviewed journal articles in the fields of neurology and cognitive disease, gerontology, psychiatry, women's health, internal medicine and medical imaging. Articles written by WHAP researchers have appeared in leading journals including The Lancet, JAMA, PLOS One, Neurobiology of Aging and Maturitas.

The study's findings have informed the development of international and national policy guidelines on women's health in reports published by Alzheimer's Disease International, the Royal Australian College of General Practitioners, National Academies Press Institute of Medicine, Global Council on Brain Health and Women's Alzheimer's Movement.

The study is governed by a Scientific Advisory Board, including three of the original chief investigators as well as leading clinicians and academic researchers who specialise in a range of areas including cardiovascular health, endocrinology, geriatrics, neurology, obstetrics and gynaecology, psychiatry, public health, epidemiology, rheumatology and women's health.

== Collaborators ==
WHAP researchers have contributed expertise to various international collaborations, including the Global Burden of Disease Study on dementia and the Asia Pacific node of the International Women's Brain Project. Data from the study also contributed to the ReSTAGE Collaboration's Stages of Reproductive Aging Workshop (STRAW) in 2001, facilitating a global standardised staging system for reproductive aging.

Nationally, WHAP collaborates with a number of biomarker programs, ageing studies and brain health initiatives, including Monash University's ASPREE Healthy Ageing Biobank, the Australian Imaging, Biomarker & Lifestyle Flagship Study of Ageing and the Study of Women's Health Across the Nation.

== Media ==
The World Economic Forum featured WHAP research in an article on the importance of regular exercise in middle age for preventing cognitive decline.

In Dancing with Dementia, a 2015 episode of the Australian TV program SBS Insight, the study's research was used to inform the program's discussion of living with dementia. Its findings on improving modifiable risk factors to prevent Alzheimer's disease were featured in a 2016 episode of the Australian TV program ABC Catalyst.

== Funding ==
The Women's Healthy Ageing Project is primarily funded by the Australian National Health and Medical Research Council (NHMRC) as well as a number of national associations and foundations affiliated with cognitive ageing and women's health.
