= Florence Fuller =

Australian artist (1867–1946)

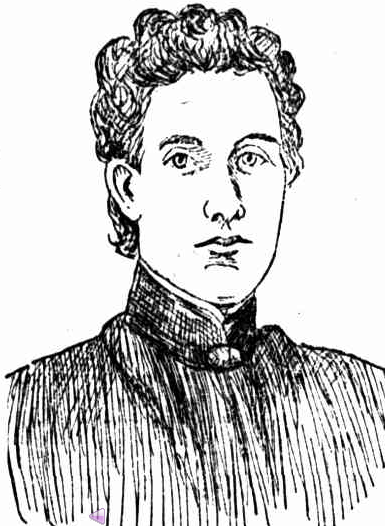
- Pen portrait of Florence Fuller, 1897
- Born: 1867; Port Elizabeth, British Cape Colony
- Died: 17 July 1946 (aged 78–79); Gladesville, New South Wales, Australia
- Education: National Gallery of Victoria Art School, Melbourne; Académie Julian, Paris
- Known for: Painting
- Notable work: Inseparables (1900); A Golden Hour (1905); Portrait of Deborah Vernon Hackett (c. 1908); Portrait of the Lord Buddha (1909–10)

Florence Ada Fuller (1867 – 17 July 1946) was a South African-born Australian artist. Originally from Port Elizabeth, Fuller migrated as a child to Melbourne with her family. There she trained with her uncle Robert Hawker Dowling and teacher Jane Sutherland and took classes at the National Gallery of Victoria Art School, becoming a professional artist in the late 1880s. In 1892 she left Australia, travelling first to South Africa, where she met and painted for Cecil Rhodes, and then on to Europe. She lived and studied there for the subsequent decade, except for a return to South Africa in 1899 to paint a portrait of Rhodes. Between 1895 and 1904 her works were exhibited at the Paris Salon and London's Royal Academy.

In 1904, Fuller returned to Australia, living in Perth. She became active in the Theosophical Society and painted some of her best-known work, including A Golden Hour, described by the National Gallery of Australia as a "masterpiece" when it acquired the work in 2013. Beginning in 1908, Fuller travelled extensively, living in India and England before ultimately settling in Sydney. There, she was the inaugural teacher of life drawing at the School of Fine and Applied Arts, established in 1920 by the New South Wales Society of Women Painters. She died in 1946.

Highly regarded during her active career as a portrait and landscape painter, by 1914 Fuller was represented in four public galleries—three in Australia and one in South Africa—a record for a woman who was an Australian painter at that time. In 1927 she began almost twenty years of institutionalization in a mental asylum, however, and her death went without notice. After her death, information about her was frequently omitted from reference books about Australian painters and knowledge of her work became obscure despite her paintings being held in public art collections including the Art Gallery of South Australia, the Art Gallery of Western Australia, the National Gallery of Australia, the National Gallery of Victoria, the Art Gallery of New South Wales and Australia's National Portrait Gallery.

== Early life and career ==
Florence Fuller was born in Port Elizabeth, South Africa, in 1867, a daughter of Louisa and John Hobson Fuller. (Note: The only source that identifies the name of John Hobson Fuller's wife is a newspaper notice pertaining to another of their daughters, Lily Vines Fuller.) She had several siblings, including sisters Amy and Christie, both of whom subsequently became singers.

The family migrated to Australia when Florence was one year old. (Note: The shipping record of the migration shows the family arriving in Melbourne in September 1868, with Florence aged 1.) She worked as a governess while undertaking studies in art, and first took classes at the National Gallery of Victoria Art School in 1883, then again for a further term of study in 1888. During this period she was a student of Jane Sutherland, referred to in the Australian Dictionary of Biography as "the leading female artist in the group of Melbourne painters who broke with the nineteenth-century tradition of studio art by sketching and painting directly from nature".

Fuller's mother's brother-in-law was Robert Hawker Dowling, a painter of orientalist and Aboriginal subjects, as well as portraits and miniatures. British-born, he had grown up in Tasmania and made a living there as a portraitist, before returning to his native England at age thirty. For the next two decades, his works were frequently hung at the Royal Academy. He returned to Australia in 1885, and Fuller became his pupil. In that year, aged eighteen, Fuller received a commission from Anne Fraser Bon, philanthropist and supporter of Victoria's Aboriginal people. The commission was for Barak–last chief of the Yarra Yarra Tribe of Aborigines, a formal oil on canvas portrait of the Wurundjeri leader, William Barak. Ultimately, that painting was acquired by the State Library of Victoria. Although the painting is an important work regularly used to illustrate this significant figure in Australia's history, interpretations of Fuller's portrait are mixed: one critic noted the painting's objectivity and avoidance of romanticising Aboriginal people, while another concluded that "Fuller is painting an ideal rather than a person".

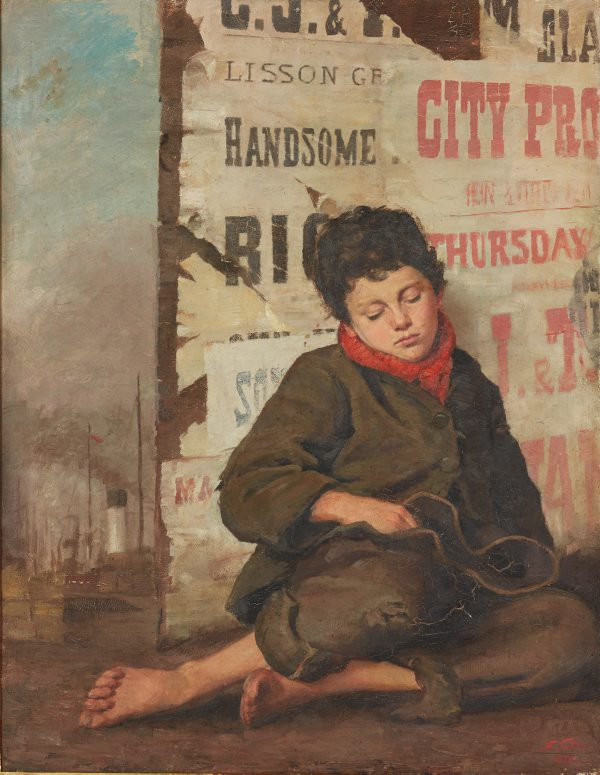
Weary, 1888

In 1886, Dowling returned to his native England. Giving up her work as a governess, Fuller began to paint full-time, and had opened her own studio before she had turned twenty. Dowling had intended to return to Australia and had left behind an incomplete portrait of the Victorian governor's wife, Lady Loch. He died, however, not long after arriving in England; Fuller then completed Dowling's commission. Lady Loch became her patron. Other early portraits followed: two pictures of homeless children, entitled Weary (inspired by Henry Wadsworth Longfellow's poem on child labour "Weariness") and Desolate, in 1888; and Gently Reproachful circa 1889. Weary was acquired by the Art Gallery of New South Wales in 2015. The gallery's curator of Australian art described the depiction of billboard posters in the painting as giving it a "sense of gritty realism that was arguably unprecedented in Australian art."

Also in 1889, Fuller was awarded a prize by the Victorian Artists Society for best portrait by an artist under twenty-five.

By August 1891 she had a studio in her home in Pine Grove, Malvern in Melbourne.

== Europe and South Africa ==
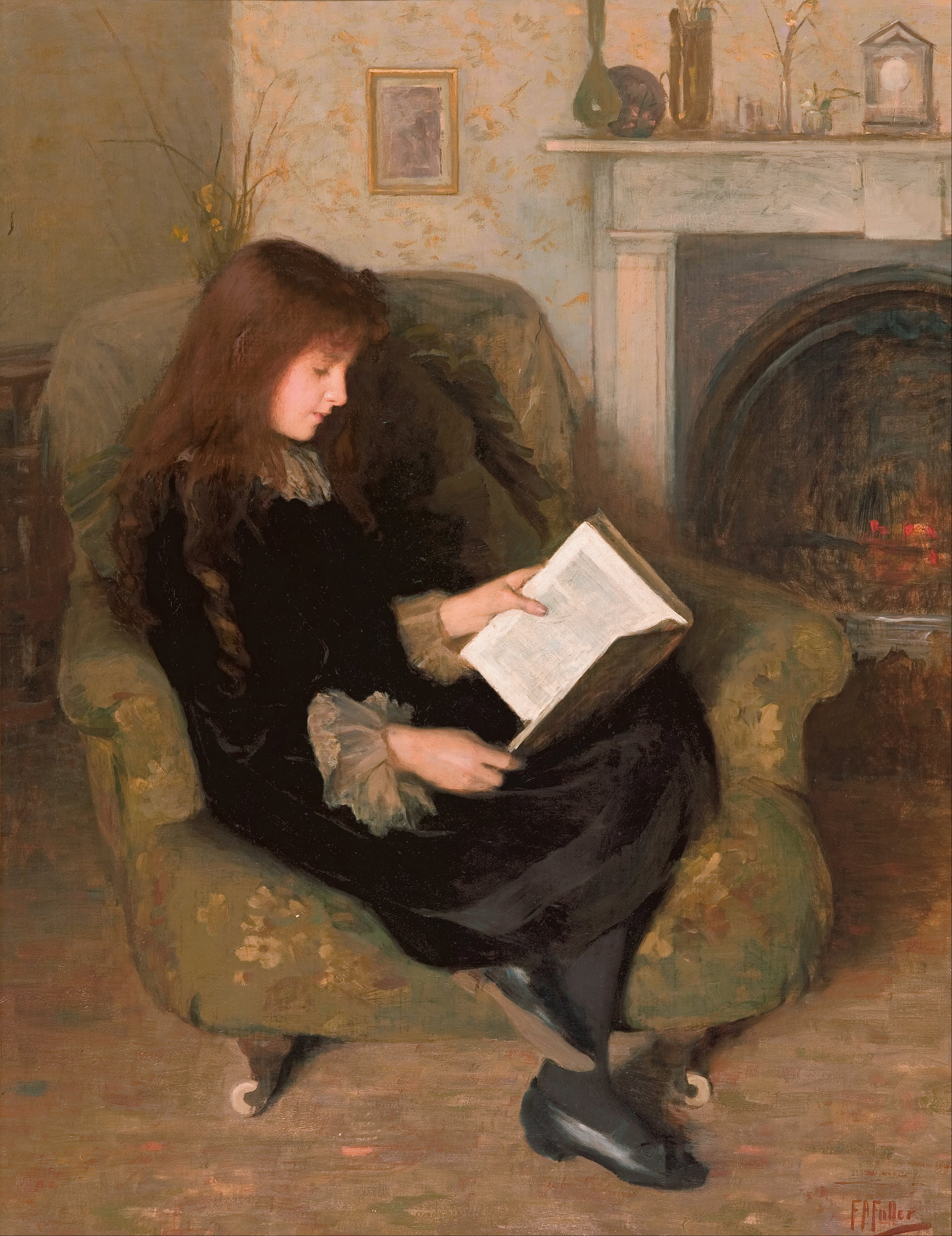
Inseparables, circa 1900

In 1892, Fuller travelled to the Cape of Good Hope "to convalesce", although from what illness or injury, her biographer Joan Kerr does not say. (Note: Kerr also states that she made the trip "presumably with her married sister Chrissie". This is probably a reference to Florence's sister Louisa Christie Fuller, who had married a South African, Charles Carey Lance, in 1890.) While there, she was a guest of her uncle Sir Thomas Ekins Fuller, a member of the Parliament of the Cape of Good Hope, and through him she met Cecil Rhodes, the Colony's Prime Minister, who commissioned her to paint a landscape showing his home. Two years later, she travelled on to England and France, where she remained for a decade. In the 1890s, Australian artists studying abroad favoured Paris over London, and Fuller was no exception. Other Australians studying in France around that time included Agnes Goodsir, Margaret Preston, James Quinn, and Hugh Ramsay. Fuller studied first at the Académie Julian, where her teachers included William-Adolphe Bouguereau, and later, Raphaël Collin, for whom she was head of studio. Many of the French art schools had only recently opened their doors to women, and those at Académie Julian experienced poor, overcrowded conditions and contempt from the (mostly male) teachers. Despite this, Fuller's skills developed, and contemporary critics commented favourably on the influence of the French training.

During her time in Europe, Fuller had great success. After a pastel portrait of hers was accepted for the Paris Salon in 1895, two of her paintings were shown there in 1896. That was followed by another, La Glaneuse, in 1897, in which year she also had a work accepted by the Royal Academy in London. She exhibited in many other locations: the Royal Institute of Oil Painters and Manchester Art Gallery in England, as well as the Victorian Artists Society and the New South Wales Society of Artists, and at the Melbourne studio of Jane Sutherland. There was even a painting, Landscape, hung in the exhibition for the fiftieth anniversary of the founding of Bendigo. Not all her time was spent in Europe, however; in 1899 she returned to South Africa to paint Cecil Rhodes. (Note: Shipping records indicate that she departed England in November 1898.) One source suggests that she ultimately prepared five portraits of the founder of Rhodesia. A later newspaper report stated that Fuller also travelled and made sketches in Wales, Ireland, and Italy.

While in Europe, Fuller painted Inseparables, which portrays the figure of a girl sitting reading a book. It was acquired by the Art Gallery of South Australia. When hanging the work as part of its exhibition The Edwardians, the National Gallery of Australia described the painting as one suggesting a love of reading. In contrast, art historian Catherine Speck regarded the work as "subversive" because of its portrayal of a young woman "gaining knowledge". In November 1902, the Australian Federal International Exhibition was held. It was opened by the Governor of Victoria Sir George Clarke, who spoke of its goal to advance "the industrial progress of Australia". The event occupied the entire Royal Exhibition Building in Melbourne, and was dominated by an exhibition of art, both Australian and international. Included in this extensive survey of painting were six works by Fuller.

== Perth ==
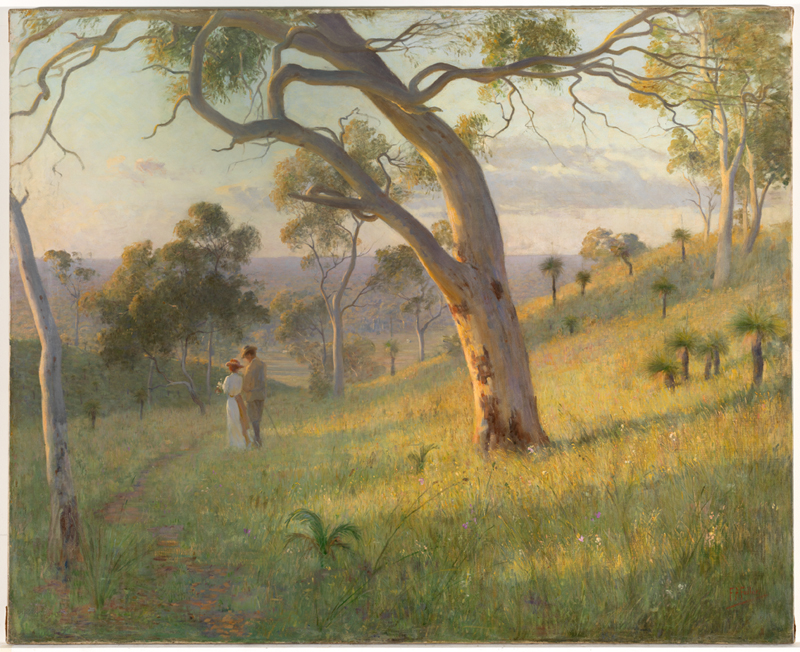
A Golden Hour, 1905

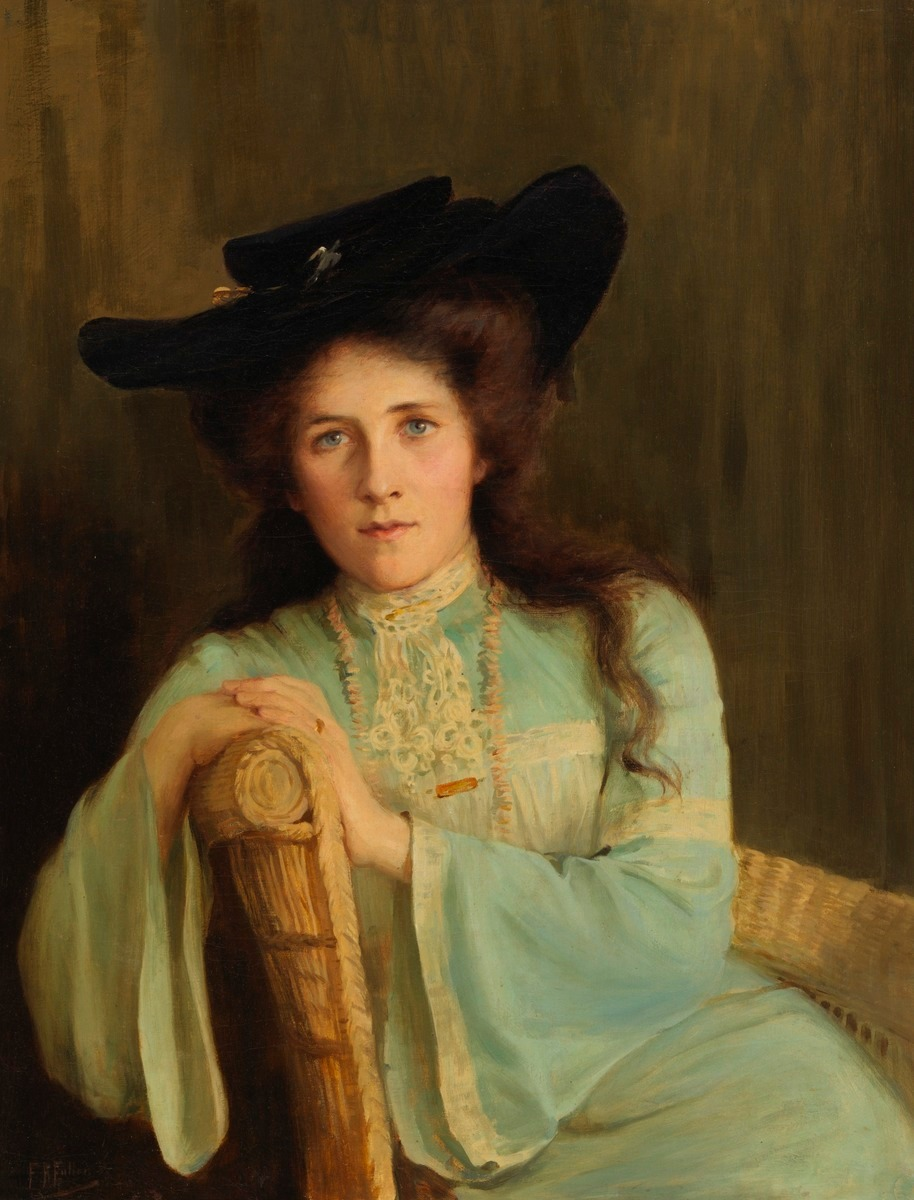
Portrait of Deborah Vernon Hackett, circa 1908

Further recognition came with the hanging of one of Fuller's paintings, Summer Breezes, at the Royal Academy in 1904. Other Australian artists whose works were hung at the same time included Rupert Bunny, E. Phillips Fox, Albert Fullwood, George Lambert, and Arthur Streeton. Fuller was the only woman painter to be represented. A critic writing in The West Australian observed:

The work ... is essentially Australian in almost every detail. Standing in a sunlit Australian paddock, a lithesome Australian blonde holds her summer hat on against the rude caresses of an Australian breeze—a subject simple but grand in its simplicity ... Next to its suggestion of breezy sunshine and the incidental portrayal of willowy grace the picture is to be admired for its colour scheme ... The details of the picture disclose untiring care.

By the time Summer Breezes was on display, Fuller had returned to Australia, not to her previous home in Melbourne but to Perth in Western Australia, where she joined her sister, Amy Fuller, who was a singer. Although only in her mid-thirties, Fuller's background made her "one of the most experienced artists in Western Australia at this time". For the next four years, she painted portraits, including one of Western Australian politician James George Lee Steere, undertaken posthumously from photographs and recollections of those who had known him. It was acquired by the gallery whose board he chaired. She also took on students, including French-Australian artist Kathleen O'Connor.

Fuller's paintings from this period included A Golden Hour, described by the National Gallery of Australia as "a masterpiece ... giving us a gentle insight into the people, places and times that make up our history". The painting, an oil on canvas 109 cm (43 in) high and 135 cm (53 in) wide, portrays a woman and a man standing together in a rural setting in late afternoon, surrounded by grass, scattered gum trees, and Xanthorrhoea. When the painting was put up for sale in 2012, the auction house catalogue stated that it had been owned by William Ride, former director of the Western Australian Museum. It reported:

The current owners assert that Professor Ride always understood the figures in the picture were Sir John Winthrop Hackett, (then owner of The West Australian newspaper, well known business man and philanthropist, whose gift allowed the construction of the impressive University of Western Australia buildings and St. George's Residential College) and his new wife, Deborah Vernon Hackett". (Note: When A Golden Hour was sold at auction in 2012, it fetched $76,000 (plus buyer's premium), around three times the pre-sale estimate.)

In addition to appearing as the small figure of a woman in A Golden Hour, Deborah Vernon Hackett was also the subject of a portrait, painted around 1908, again during Fuller's time in Perth. Anne Gray, the head of Australian art at the National Gallery of Australia, observed of Fuller's approach to the newspaperman's wife, that:

Fuller portrayed her sitter sympathetically, capturing the young woman's grace and charm. But she also conveyed the complexity of the young Mrs Hackett's character through her soft, feminine, pale-blue dress counterpoised by the dramatic black hat and direct gaze.

Fuller painted other works for the Hacketts. In a 1937 piece reflecting on early twentieth-century art in Western Australia, a reviewer recalled:

Dr. (later Sir Winthrop) Hackett was a great patron of Miss Fuller, and he was a constant visitor to her dignified studio, above his office in the old West Australian Chambers. The first portrait I saw Miss Fuller working on was of Mrs. E. Chase ... The portrait was a commission from Dr. Hackett, and was destined to hang in his gallery. Miss Fuller painted Lady Hackett both before and after her marriage, and one particularly happy picture of her is as a young girl gathering wildflowers in the Darlington hills. Her portraits of the first Hackett babies were charming studies of childhood.

== Theosophy and later career ==
Biographer Joan Kerr speculated that it may have been Jane Sutherland who introduced Fuller to Theosophy, a spiritual and mystical philosophy that teaches the unity of existence and emphasises the search for universal wisdom. Described by art historian Jenny McFarlane as "the most important counter-cultural organisation of the late nineteenth and early twentieth centuries", it was influential throughout Fuller's life. Fuller, one of numerous Australian artists who became theosophists, including Violet Teague, Vida Lahey and Ethel Carrick, joined the society in Perth on 29 May 1905, after hearing charismatic theosophist Charles Webster Leadbeater during his lecture tour. Bessie Rischbieth was a feminist who joined at the same time, and together they influenced the movement's development in early twentieth century Perth. Fuller was variously secretary, treasurer, and librarian of the local branch of the Theosophical Society. Fuller had a studio in Perth, first at St Georges Terrace and later in the premises of The West Australian, and the Society used these for their meetings.

In 1906 Fuller's portrait of feminist and theosophist Annie Besant was among the paintings exhibited at the West Australian Art Society's annual exhibition. Around the same period, she painted other portraits of the movement's leading figures, including Henry Steel Olcott and Helena Petrovna Blavatsky. These representations departed from the academic portraiture in which Fuller had trained, as she incorporated practices of intuition and visualisation "inspired by Indian aesthetics as mediated by the Theosophical Society".

In 1907, Besant became the president of the Theosophical Society globally, and set to work with a major expansion of the organisation's headquarters at Adyar, in what was then Madras. When it was announced that Besant would undertake a speaking tour of Australia in 1908, she was expected to stay with Fuller while in Perth. Some months later in 1908, (Note: Gray's 2011 biographical notes on Fuller state that she was in Perth until 1908. Kerr's 1995 biographical profile gives the year 1909. Newspaper reports from the period state that she was farewelled by the members of the Theosophical Society on 30 July 1908 prior to a 4 August departure, but travelled first to Melbourne and then back again through Perth in September 1908, before setting out for the subcontinent.) Fuller left Western Australia and travelled to India, staying at Adyar. (Note: Both Kerr's biographical note and Gray's subsequent profile that cites Kerr refer to Fuller visiting "the Theosophists' Calcutta headquarters, Adyar". Fuller certainly visited the Theosophist headquarters; but Adyar is not in Calcutta.) Of her time in India, Fuller wrote:

I went in search not only of beauty, and light, and colour, and the picturesqueness in general, which delight the eye and emotions of all artists—but of something deeper—something less easily expressed. I spent two and a half years in a community that is quite unique—perhaps the most cosmopolitan settlement in the world—the headquarters of the Theosophical Society ... Well, I painted there, of course, but my art was undergoing a change, and I felt that it could not satisfy me unless it became so much greater.

Fuller's time at Adyar was eventful. Leadbeater arrived around the same time as Fuller, and soon afterward he "discovered" the person he believed would become a global teacher and orator, Jiddu Krishnamurti (then in his teens). Leadbetter and others tutored Krishnamurti. Fuller may have taught him photography. She also had a small studio built in the grounds, and painted. Her works from the period include a portrait of Leadbeater and Portrait of the Lord Buddha. McFarlane emphasises the significance of the latter work, pointing out that it is "strikingly modern" in comparison to all of Fuller's other work, and more radical than compositions created by Grace Cossington Smith and Roland Wakelin, half a decade later. The painting owes much to theosophy's emphasis on seeing the subject "through a psychic, visionary experience".

Fuller faced the challenge of reconciling her academic, European artistic training with the spiritual and philosophical priorities of theosophical thought. Her portrait of Leadbeater, painted in 1910, shows her in that transition. Fuller drew on the work of contemporary Indian artists of the Bengal School of Art, and the writings of art historian Ernest Havell and philosopher Ananda Coomaraswamy to "find the formal strategies that she needed" to produce the kind of art to which she was committed. While this changed her technique at Adyar, her later works did not continue this radical stylistic departure, instead being produced "to please a market comfortable with conventional portraiture".

Sources describing Fuller's movements after her time in India sometimes are ambiguous. She arrived in England in June 1911, where she marched with Besant in the suffragette protests associated with the coronation of George V. She continued to paint portraits, but found it difficult to realise the transformation in her art that she had conceptualised in India:

I have painted a great many portraits since I have been in England, and have been, I suppose, fairly successful—though I have done nothing in any way remarkable. The hidden inner life has not yet succeeded in expressing itself on canvas, and I can only write myself as one who aspires to a greater art, but who has not yet achieved.

Fuller subsequently travelled from London to India in 1914. One newspaper report described her as a "visitor" to Sydney in 1916, although McFarlane says she travelled there with Leadbeater and remained in the city. During that visit, she held an exhibition of her miniatures, all of them portraits of theosophists including Besant and Henry Olcott, co-founder of the Theosophical Society. She visited Brisbane in 1917. Fuller spent a period painting in Java (at that time part of the Dutch East Indies), although when this occurred is not clear: McFarlane says she was there with Leadbeater, painting while he was giving lectures. There was at least one subsequent substantial journey, as Fuller arrived again to Sydney, via Perth, from India in 1919. At some point following these travels, Fuller settled permanently in Mosman in Sydney's northern suburbs, where she continued to paint, including miniatures.

In 1920, the Society of Women Painters in New South Wales established a School of Fine and Applied Arts, with Florence Fuller appointed as the inaugural teacher of life classes. At the exhibition held to mark the school's establishment, Fuller displayed a portrait of the organisation's founder, Mrs Hedley Parsons. When the society held a show in 1926, a portrait by Fuller was one of those selected for favourable comment, but the general opinion of The Sydney Morning Herald reviewer was that "the exhibitors have let their style harden into a groove". Fuller continued to be associated with the theosophical community as her health and economic circumstances deteriorated.

In 1927, at the age of sixty, she was committed to Gladesville Mental Asylum (as it was then known), where she died nearly two decades later, on 17 July 1946. She was buried at Rookwood Cemetery.

Florence Fuller Street in the Canberra suburb of Conder is named in her honour.

== Style and legacy ==
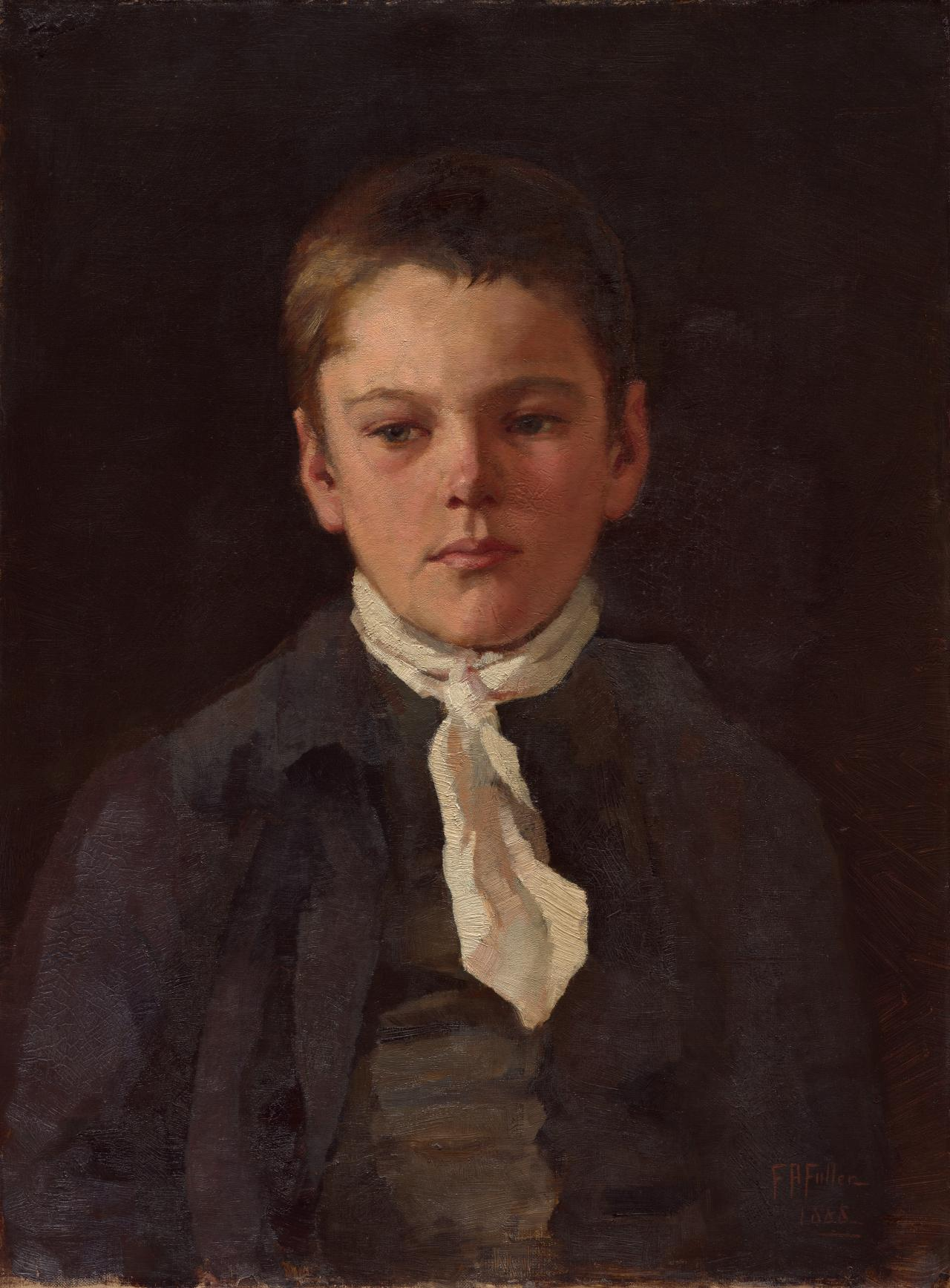
Paper Boy (1888), acquired by the National Gallery of Victoria in 2019

Gwenda Robb and Elaine Smith, in their Concise Dictionary of Australian Artists, considered Fuller's art to be created in "a free painterly style indebted to Impressionism". During the first decade of the twentieth century, reviews drew attention to her distinctively Australian style. When one of Fuller's works was included in an exhibition of colonial artists in London (including paintings from Canada and Australia), the correspondent from the Adelaide Advertiser described Fuller's contribution as "most Australian in feeling". Reviewing her work hung in the Royal Academy in 1904, a Perth critic reported: "Of the 16 or 17 Australian artists exhibiting at the Academy, Miss Fuller was the only one who chose a typically Australian scene. Her picture shows a young girl in thin white, clinging, dress, standing on a bushy piece of country ... As the London Observer says, the atmosphere that bathes the graceful figure of the girl is capitally managed with its note of subtropical heat". One reviewer thought very highly of her portraits, but was less convinced about Fuller's approach to the Australian light, writing:

She had less success with our landscapes than with her figure subjects. That was the result of her passion for toning her pictures for ultimate indoor hanging. Thereby she lost, or illuminated, the hard Australian, hard light and shade, and startling relative values. Observable too was the influence of the English school in her rendering of our foliage; never could she bring herself to see our trees as dim coloured as they usually are.

Reviewing the Western Australian Art Society's exhibition in 1906, the critic for Perth's Western Mail considered Fuller's works to be the finest on show, and that "the occasion provides another triumph for Miss Fuller".

Art critic and curator Jenny McFarlane considered Fuller's work to be complex, drawing not only on European modernist academic traditions and Australian subjects, but also at times, incorporating "radical stylistic innovations" that drew on Indian artistic tradition and theosophy's ideas. Fuller's style and choice of subject were strongly influenced by the theory and practice of the theosophy movement. Compared to her earlier works, portraits painted at Adyar showed a reduced tonal range and a shift from academic portraiture to representation of the 'hidden inner life' of the subject. In Portrait of the Lord Buddha, she worked with a colour palette reflecting theosophy's attribution of specific meanings to colours and used little tonal variation.

In 1914, it was reported that Fuller was represented in four public galleries—three in Australia and one in South Africa—a record for an Australian woman painter at that time. Yet although she experienced considerable success during her early life, Fuller subsequently became almost invisible. No obituaries appeared in the newspapers in 1946. She is not mentioned at all in Janine Burke's Australian Women Artists 1840–1940, Max Germaine's Dictionary of Women Artists in Australia, nor Caroline Ambrus's Australian Women Artists. However her biography and work were included in the nationally touring 1985–1986 exhibition and its catalogue Golden Summers: Heidelberg and beyond. Works also toured in the exhibition Completing the picture: women artists and the Heidelberg era in 1992-1993 and were discussed in detail and illustrated in Janda Gooding's Western Australian art and artists, 1900-1950 exhibition and publication. In 2013, Ann Gray described Fuller as "an important Australian woman artist and arguably Western Australia's most significant artist from the Federation period". Works by Fuller are held by the Art Gallery of South Australia, the Art Gallery of Western Australia, the National Gallery of Australia, the City of Perth, the National Gallery of Victoria, Australia's National Portrait Gallery, the Art Gallery of New South Wales and the State Library of Victoria. Internationally, her work is held by the Newport Museum and Art Gallery in South Wales.

== Gallery ==
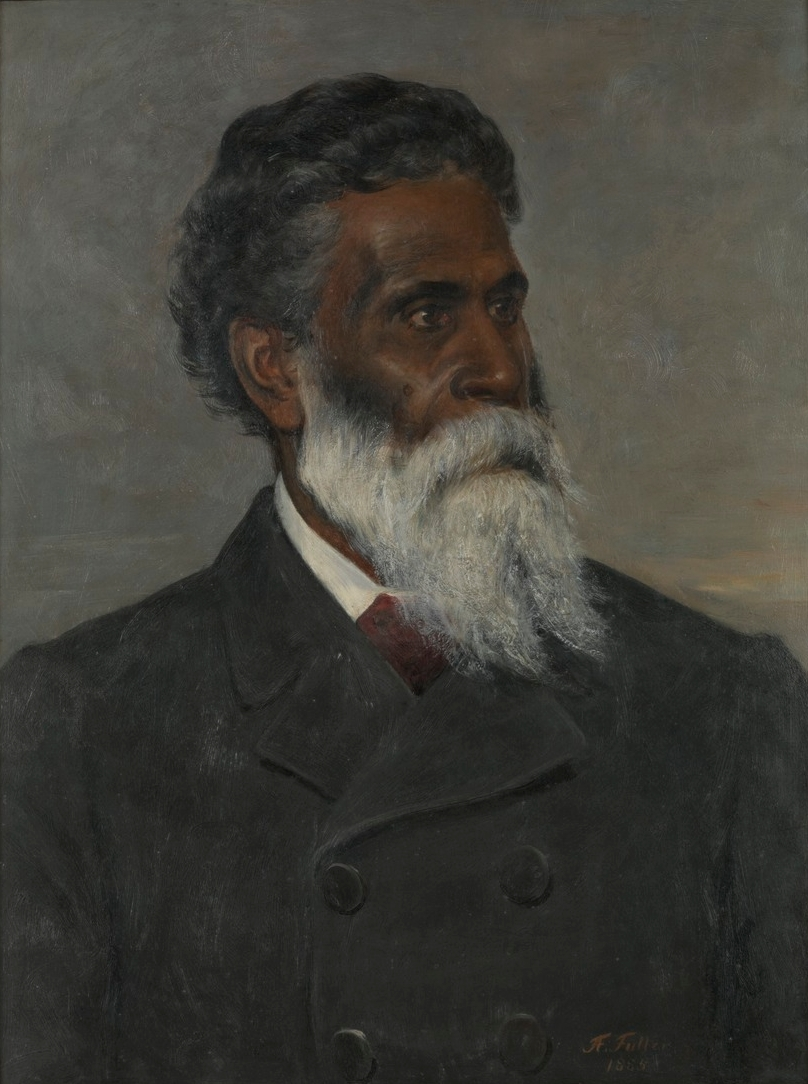
Portrait of William Barak, 1885, State Library Victoria

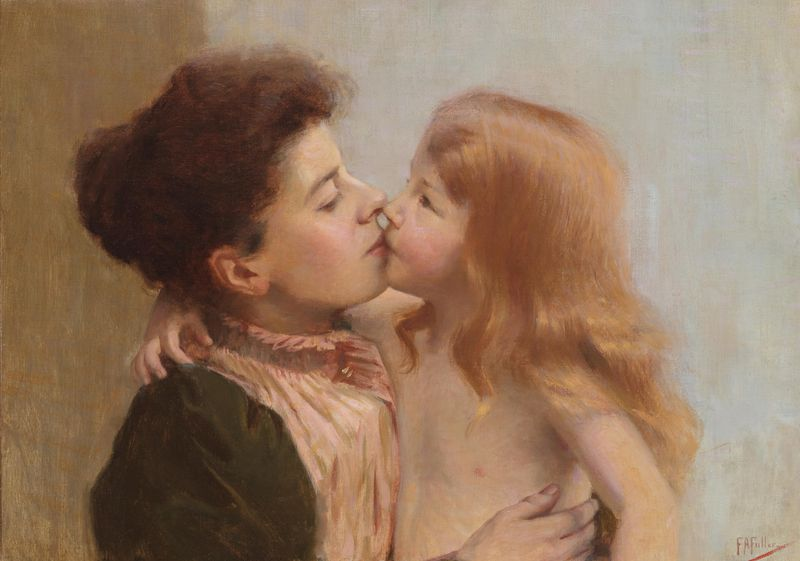
Mother and Child, c. 1880s–90s, Art Gallery of South Australia

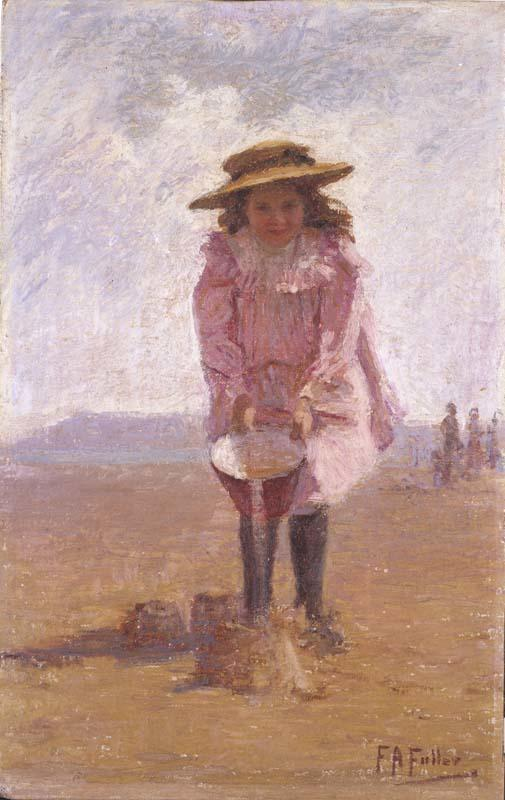
Sand Pies, 1893, Art Gallery of Western Australia
