= Cassandra Szoeke =

Australian medical researcher

- Education: University of Melbourne, Flinders University
- Scientific career
- Fields: Neurology and women's health
- Workplaces: University of Melbourne Australian Medical Association Australian Healthy Ageing Organisation

Cassandra Szoeke is an Australian medical researcher and practicing physician in internal medicine, with a sub-specialisation in neurology.

Szoeke is the director of the Healthy Ageing Program at the University of Melbourne and principal investigator of the Women's Healthy Ageing Project, which is the longest ongoing study of women's health in Australia.

== Education ==
Szoeke earned her BSc(Hons) at the University of Melbourne, before completing her MBBS at Flinders University. She was awarded a PhD in epidemiology by the department of medicine at the University of Melbourne, before completing her postdoctoral studies in public health and policy with Stanford University and Duke University. She became a fellow of the Royal Australasian College of Physicians in 2001.

== Work ==
Since 2015, Szoeke has been the director of the Healthy Ageing Program at the University of Melbourne, which includes the Women's Healthy Ageing Project, an ongoing longitudinal study of Australian women initiated in 1990.

She serves as a councillor for the Australian Medical Association, the peak professional body for doctors in Australia, a role to which she was appointed in 2019. As part of an international collaboration investigating sex determinants to cognitive health, she also serves as lead of the Asia Pacific node for the Women's Brain Project. She is Chief Medical Officer for the Australian Healthy Ageing Organisation.

Szoeke has held a number of elected management positions in Victorian medical research associations. She served on the Board of executive directors for the Western Health Service Network in Victoria from 2012 to 2015, chairing the Quality and Safety as well as Education and Research Board sub-committees.

From 2008 to 2010, she led the research theme of Neurodegenerative Diseases, Mental Disorders and Brain Health at the Australian Commonwealth Science and Industry Organisation (CSIRO), and subsequently served as a Clinical Consultant in Preventive Health from 2010 to 2012.

She is chief editor of Frontiers of Global Women's Health.

== Policy ==
In 2020, Szoeke presented a background paper with the Australian Association of Gerontology as part of the development process for Australia's Primary Health Care 10 Year Plan (2022–2032).

Szoeke's research has been cited in major policy reports published by the World Health Organisation, Alzheimer's Disease International, RACGP, Melbourne Academic Centre for Health, and the National Academies Institute of Medicine.

== Research ==
In 2021, Szoeke published Secrets of Women's Healthy Ageing (2021), which shared lessons from thirty years of data on women's health and wellbeing from Women's Healthy Ageing Project.

=== Sex differences ===
Szoeke's research showing that hormone therapy may prevent or delay the onset of dementia was included as a chapter in the first book to examine sex and gender differences in Alzheimer's disease (Elsevier, 2021).

Her work as senior clinical author on a systematic analysis of dementia for the Global Burden of Disease Study in 2016 showed that more women had dementia than men at all ages, and was the first such work to report global prevalence of dementia by sex.

=== Health technologies ===
Szoeke served as clinical lead on the development of the Brainy App, an initiative of Alzheimer's Australia, in partnership with the Bupa Health Foundation running from 2011 to 2020.
