= Dementia 10/66 =

Dementia research group

The 10/66 Dementia research group was founded in the year 1998 at the Alzheimer's Disease International Annual Conference in Cochin, India. The premise of the research group was that only less than 10% of the population based studies on dementia were being performed in developing countries where about 66% of population with dementia lived. The 10/66 Dementia Research Group aimed to address this imbalance of researches and to encourage collaborations between research centers in various developing nations and between developed nations and developing nations.

== Key findings ==
=== Dementia epidemiology ===
The prevalence of dementia varied across different settings. It ranged from 4.8% in rural China to 12.6% in Cuba. Such wide variation was attributed to underreporting in less developed settings. In research settings like rural China care givers were less likely to report the social and functional impairment which formed the basis of diagnosis as per DSM - IV. The incidence rate of 10/66 dementia varied between 18.2 per 1000 person-years in Peru to 30.4 per 1000 person-years in Mexico. This was found to be 1.4–2.7 times higher than the incidence reported in DSM-IV dementia. Male sex, higher educational achievement were revealed to be protective factors for dementia. This gave even more supporting evidence for the cognitive reserve hypothesis.

=== Mental health ===
Evidence on the prevalence of various Mental health disorders like anxiety and depressive disorders among older adults living in low- and middle-income countries was also very limited. The prevalence of depression was reported to vary from a 0.3% to 13.8%. The prevalence of anxiety was similar to ICD-10 depression estimates.

=== Non‑communicable diseases ===
Hypertension was the most common diagnosis (63.6% overall), followed by frailty (15.2%), dementia (8.7%), stroke (7.1%), depression (4.7%) and ischaemic heart disease (4.4%)
