= Christie Fuller =

Australian singer

- Born: Louisa Christie Fuller
- Died: 15 August 1933; Strathfield, Australia
- Occupation: Singer
- Relatives: Florence Fuller (sister), Amy Fuller (sister), Sylvia Harper (daughter)
Christie Fuller
- Origin: Australia

Christie Fuller (died 15 August 1933) was an Australian singer of the late Victorian period. She performed professionally in Melbourne and internationally. She was sister to artist Florence Fuller and singer Amy Fuller.

Louisa Christie Fuller was the second daughter of John Hobson Fuller and Louisa Fuller (née Vines). She was a contralto. In 1886 she travelled to England to study, before returning to Melbourne the following year, where she subsequently performed professionally. Newspaper notices indicate that she performed publicly with her sister Amy on some occasions, including in Sydney in 1898 and in Perth in 1910. Fuller toured and performed in London and South Africa, as well as across Australia.

In Melbourne on 14 August 1890 she married Charles Carey Lance, and after living in Euroa, Victoria and northern New South Wales, the family settled in Sydney. They had two sons, Arnold, born 1892, Francis, born 1893, and a daughter, Sylvia, born 1895, who – under her married name Sylvia Harper, or Mrs. R Harper – became a tennis player who competed internationally representing Australia.

Charles and Christie Lance were living in Strathfield, New South Wales when she died in August 1933.
