= Lorraine Dennerstein =

Australian scientist

Professor Lorraine Dennerstein
- Born: 1947 (age 78–79); Australia
- Citizenship: Australian
- Education: University of Melbourne, Monash University, Royal Australian College of Psychiatrists
- Scientific career
- Fields: Women's mental and sexual health
- Website: http://www.lorrainedennerstein.com.au/

Lorraine Dennerstein M.B.B.S., Ph.D., D.P.M., M.R.A.N.Z.C.P., F.R.A.N.Z.C.P., HonDMedSc (born 1947) is a leading Australian researcher and practicing psychiatrist specialising in women's mental and sexual health, together with medico-legal reports in major personal injury claims.

== Education ==
Dennerstein received an M.B.B.S. from the University of Melbourne in 1970. She was awarded a Ph.D. from the department of obstetrics and gynaecology at Monash University in 1979 for her study of the effects of the contraceptive pill on libido in women. Subsequently, she qualified as a psychiatrist in 1980, obtained a Diploma in Psychological Medicine from the University of Melbourne in 1981 and became a fellow of the Royal Australian and New Zealand College of Psychiatrists in 1983.

== Work ==
Dennerstein is a legally qualified medical practitioner registered by the Medical Board of Australia. She is a psychiatrist and specifically focuses on women's mental health and psychosexual dysfunction. She holds current positions as professor emeritus for the department of psychiatry at The University of Melbourne and as the founding director of Platinum Medico-Legal Services.

She has spent the last 30 years researching the relationship of ovarian steroids to mood and sexual functioning. Her contributions to medical research and women's sexual health resulted in her being made an Officer of the Order of Australia (AO) in 1994. In 1990, she initiated the Melbourne Women's Midlife Health Project, now known as Women's Healthy Ageing Project which is the longest ongoing study of women’s health in Australia. She founded and directed the first academic centre for teaching and research in women's health and has established postgraduate courses in women's health, which were employed at the University of Melbourne and at international institutions. In 1997, she founded the Office for Gender and Health. She was awarded a personal chair at the University of Melbourne in recognition of her international contribution to teaching and research in women's health.

Dennerstein has held numerous elected and honorary positions both internationally and within Australia. She has held 23 international positions, including the president of International Society for the Study of Women's Sexual Health and had also been a consultant to the Commonwealth Secretariat (London), the World Health Organization, the Global Commission on Women's Health (WHO) and the International Bioethics Committee of UNESCO. Additionally, she has also held 33 positions within Australia. Dennerstein has been a member of many editorial boards and holds a current position as review editor of the Journal of Sexual Medicine.

== Personal life ==
Dennerstein lives in Melbourne, Australia.

She is divorced.

She has three grandchildren.

== Awards and honours ==
- Doctor of Medical Science honoris causa, University of Melbourne (2012)
- World Association for Sexology Gold Medal for lifetime achievement (2005)
- North American Menopause Society (NAMS)/Pfizer Perimenopause Research Award (2002)
- WIZO Woman Achiever, Women's International Zionist Organization (2000)
- Commonwealth Award of Excellence for Good Practice in Women's Health: the Melbourne Women's Midlife Health Project (1997)
- Commonwealth Award for Excellence for Good Practice in Women's Health: the Key Centre for Women's Health (1997)
- Annual Travelling Fellowship, Australian Soc. for Psychosomatic Obstetrics & Gynaecology (1996)
- Officer of the Order of Australia (AO), 1994 Australia Day Honours for "service to medical education and medical research, particularly in relation to women's health issues"
- Organon Senior Research Award presented by the Royal Australian and New Zealand College of Psychiatrists (1989)
- Book of the Year Award "Arthur Shapiro Hypnosis Book Award", American Society of Clinical and Experimental Hypnosis for 'Handbook of Hypnosis and Psychosomatic Medicine (1981)
- Annual Travelling Fellowship, Australian Soc. for Psychosomatic Obstetrics & Gynaecology (1979)
