= Amy Fuller (singer) =

- Birth name: Amy V. Fuller
- Origin: Australia
- Occupation(s): Australian singer of the late Victorian and Edwardian periods
- Instrument: voice
- Years active: 1900–1920s

Amy V. Fuller was an Australian singer of the late Victorian and Edwardian periods. She performed professionally in Perth, Western Australia. She was sister to artist Florence Fuller and singer Christie Fuller.

In the 1900s, Fuller performed in Perth, including with the Belle Crome Company. In 1905, she was one of the four soloists in a performance of Handel's Messiah at Perth's His Majesty's Theatre. Newspaper notices indicate that she performed publicly with her sister Christie on some occasions, including in Sydney in 1898 and in Perth in 1910.

In the 1920s, Fuller turned from singing to crafts, exhibiting in Perth, where a show of her work was opened by Lady Moulden, who had also been a patron of her sister Florence. Amy Fuller's craftworks used stained timber to create Australian floral designs.
