= Paul Murphy (Australian journalist) =

Australian journalist (died 2020)

Paul Murphy AM (1942 or 1943 – 20 October 2020) was an Australian political journalist and radio and television presenter.

== Career ==
He presented the ABC's afternoon radio current affairs program PM for a decade from 1983 to 1993.

Among his favourite moments on the program during his time there was the coverage of the final caucus showdown between Bob Hawke and Paul Keating.

In the 1994 Australia Day Honours, Murphy was made a Member of the Order of Australia (AM) for "service to public broadcasting and to journalism".

In 2000, he was awarded the Walkley Award for Most Outstanding Contribution to Journalism.

Murphy died from cancer on 20 October 2020, aged 77.
