= Conrad Primmer =

Rugby player (1924–2014)

- Full name: Conrad James Primmer
- Born: 24 March 1924 Brisbane, Australia
- Died: 10 December 2014 (aged 90)
- School: Brisbane Grammar School
- University: University of Queensland
- Occupation: Gynaecologist

Rugby union career
- Position: Lock
International career
Years	Team	Apps	(Points)
1951	Australia	2	(0)

Conrad James Primmer OAM (24 March 1924 — 10 December 2014) was an Australian rugby union international.

Born in Brisbane, Primmer was educated at Brisbane Grammar School. He served in the Navy during the war, as did his brother Jack, who was killed in the sinking of HMAS Sydney. Following the war, Primmer played rugby for GPS and then the University of Queensland, while studying for his medical degree.

Primmer, a lock and specialist line-out jumper, was called up by the Wallabies to contest the Bledisloe Cup for a home series against the All Blacks in 1951. Capped twice, he played in the 1st Test at the Sydney Cricket Ground and 3rd Test at the Gabba. His decision to prioritise his studies cost him further selection.

A gynaecologist, Primmer was a founder of the Australian Country Hospital Heritage Association and was awarded the Medal of the Order of Australia (OAM) in the 1994 Australia Day Honours for services to the community.

== See also ==
- List of Australia national rugby union players
