= Mayse Young =

Australian publican and entrepreneur (1912–2006)

Mayse Young OAM
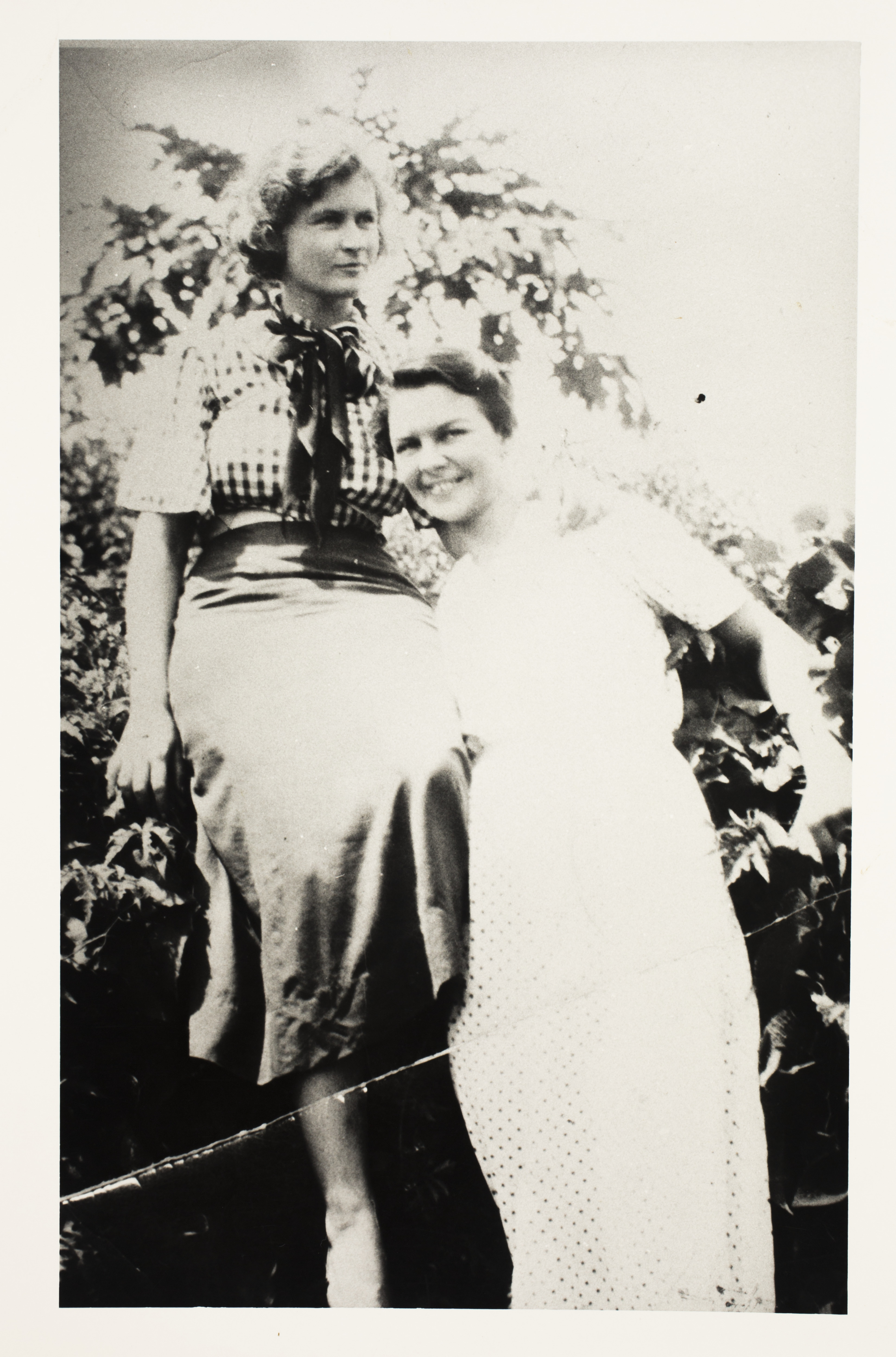
- Mayse Young (left) with another young woman, 1930
- Born: 19 July 1912; North Queensland, Australia
- Died: 20 March 2006 (aged 93)
- Spouse: Joe "Bogga" Young (m. 1933)
- Parents: George Dowling (father); Elizabeth Dowling (mother)

Mayse Young OAM (19 July 1912 – 20 March 2006) was an Australian outback publican and a pioneer of the Northern Territory's hospitality industry. She ran pubs in Pine Creek, Katherine and Darwin.

== Early life ==
Young was born in North Queensland to parents George and Elizabeth Dowling. Her siblings names were Ted, Jim and Ethel. Her father was a ganger on the railways and worked throughout the state and this meant that her childhood was somewhat itinerant and that the family travelled regularly – from job to job. Times were tough and Young did not have a pair of shoes until she was 11 years old and attended school only when there was one available nearby.

== Life in the Northern Territory ==
In 1927 the family moved to the Northern Territory and soon after built the Pine Creek Hotel, in Pine Creek, in the 1930s. While the pub was under construction the family lived in a tent nearby. When the pub was constructed Mayse later wrote:

After living in a tent all my life it seemed like a palace. We wandered around in amazement, becoming adjusted to the fact that we now had such luxuries as real beds. Mum even had a stove to cook on, instead of billy cans and camp ovens.

She became known there as a generous and friendly spirit with a good sense of humour. It is said that she was able to connect with all the visitors at the pub. She was 'Mum' to hundreds of stockmen, miners and drifters for who her hotel was the best drinking hole on the track.

In 1933 Young married Joe "Bogga" Young who worked in construction and they first lived together at Spring Hill mine near Pine Creek.

During World War II she was evacuated by air on 31 December 1941 to South Australia and she was soon after joined by her husband. They spent the remainder of the war running a hotel at Crystal Brook. On their return to Pine Creek after the war they found that the pub had been used as a soldiers recreation hall and was stripped and derelict.

She showed good business sense and, from 1950 on, owned and operated pubs in Darwin (The Seabreeze, which was destroyed in Cyclone Tracy) and Katherine (the Commercial Hotel and the Katherine Hotel); as well as taking over the management of the Pine Creek Hotel. She was also involved in the pastoral industry and owned a number of cattle stations. She did this all while raising 7 children.

In 1991 she published her autobiography: No Place for a Woman; this was a nod to her life as the ‘odd woman out’ – living in places that were mostly made up of men. This was co-authored by journalist and film producer Gabrielle Dalton.

Young was awarded the Medal of the Order of Australia for her service to the community in 1994.

Young died on 20 March 2006 at the age of 93.

== Resources ==
A collection of her photographs were donated by Young to Library & Archives NT and are available in full online; many of these images document the pioneering days of aviation, a field of special interest to Young.
