= John Calaby =

Australian zoologist and mammalogist

John Henry Calaby (19 October 1922 – 19 September 1998) was an Australian mammalogist. He was born in the Victoria and died in the Australian Capital Territory. Calaby's early career began in the CSIRO, engaged in the rabbit control program adapting the myxoma virus as a means of eradicating the pest species in Western Australia. His works include co-authorship in the first national survey of Australian mammals, undertaken in the 1960s, a biography of Walter Baldwin Spencer, So much that is new (1985), and a 200-page volume on the kangaroos in 1969. Calaby's literary works include biographical entries of early naturalists active in Australia, published in the Australian Dictionary of Biography, these accounts were of John Edward Gray, Ludwig Preiss, George Shaw, John MacGillivray and John Latham. His special interest in mammals was also engaged through the foundation of the Australian Mammal Society and as editor of its bulletin. Calaby also held membership in the Australian Institute of Aboriginal Studies. He gained promotion through his career to become Senior Principal Research Scientist at the CSIRO section studying wildlife (native fauna), and later as Assistant Chief scientist of the wildlife division, Toward the end of his career he was received as a fellow of the Royal Zoological Society of New South Wales and appointed as an Honorary Research Fellow after his retirement from the CSIRO. His recognition after his retirement also included honorary positions with the Australian and the American Mammal Society and as an Officer of the Order of Australia (AO) for scientific endeavours in zoology, ecology and his works in the field of Australian mammalogy. Calaby was responsible for assembling what would become the Australian National Wildlife Collection, formally designated in 1976, in which he had provided vouchers for over 45,000 specimens. Calaby's contribution to biology has been commemorated in the names of thirty species.
