= Philippe Lehert =

Belgian scientist (born 1949)

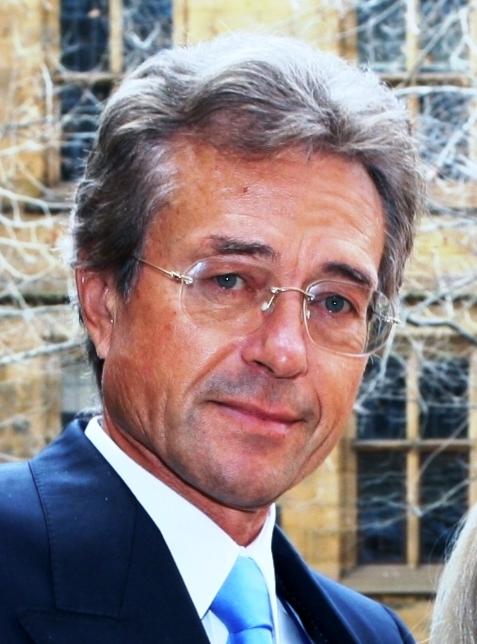
- Born: August 1, 1949 (age 77); Belgium
- Citizenship: Belgium
- Education: University of Louvain
- Scientific career
- Fields: Mathematical statistics, Biostatistics

Philippe Lehert (born August 1, 1949) is a Belgian scientist specializing in mathematical statistics and biostatistics.

== Early life and education ==
Lehert earned a Master of Science in Applied Mathematics and Engineering from the Faculty of Applied Mathematics in Mons, Belgium, in 1974. He later completed his PhD at the Department of Mathematics of Mons University, focusing on computational complexity in cluster analysis within Euclidean spaces.

== Achievements ==
Lehert is an Honorary Professor at the School of Management, Louvain University, Belgium, and the Faculty of Medicine at the University of Melbourne, Australia. He has also served as a statistical adviser for the United Nations and a member of the Belgian Board of Statistics.

His research includes the development of statistical techniques for evaluating the long-term effects of anti-diabetic drugs and methods for randomized trials in addiction, psychiatric disorders, and cardiovascular diseases. He contributed to new developments of Structural Equation Modeling to assess the impact of lifestyle on aging, and menopausal effects on mood and bone loss.

, Lehert developed predictive models In Vitro Fertilization probability of pregnancy, and survival of extremely preterm infants.

In the field of pattern recognition and artificial intelligence, he provided the first demonstration of the linear expected time O(n) complexity of clustering by connected components for any Minkowsky distances, based on cubic tessellations structures in hyperspaces.
