= Simon Molesworth =

Australian environmental lawyer

Simon Richard Molesworth AO KC (born 2 April 1954) is an Australian barrister and environmentalist. He has been a director of some 22 corporations and chairman or president of 14.

== Career ==
After initially practicing as a solicitor (from 1978), Molesworth became a barrister in Victoria in 1984 and was appointed a Queen's Counsel in 1995, specialising in environmental, planning, heritage and natural resource law. Molesworth served as a Senior Legal Member of the Planning Division of the Administrative Appeals Tribunal of Victoria and a Senior Legal Member of the Victorian Planning Appeals Board and the Victorian State Mining Warden. Amongst 4 in the natural resources field, Molesworth was to mid-2010 chair of Greenearth Energy Limited, a geothermal energy company.

In 1983, Molesworth became a founder and Inaugural President of the National Environmental Law Association of Australia (NELA). Molesworth was a Founder and Inaugural Chairman of the board of the Environment Defenders Office (Victoria) Limited, an independent public interest legal centre providing environmental law services to the Victoria community (1990–97) and helped lead the move to establish EDOs in every Australian State and Territory.

Molesworth was a councillor of the National Trust of Australia (Victoria) from 1980 to 2005, serving as honorary chairman and then president. From 1988 to October 2009, he was a board member of the Australian Council of National Trusts and was its chairman 2001–06. In this capacity, he participated in national co-operative forums: the Regional Cultural Alliance (2003–06) and the National Cultural Heritage Forum (2002–07). From 2009 to 2015, Molesworth was the ACNT's International Affairs Ambassador, representing the Australian National Trusts on the INTO World Congress and at other international forums.

In 1985, Molesworth became a founder of the then Environment Institute of Australia, becoming its first public officer and remaining for 15 years. As president from 1995 to 2005, he guided the institute's expansion into New Zealand in 2002. He oversaw the creation of the Certified Environmental Practitioner Scheme, becoming a foundation member of the C.Env.P. Board.

In 2013, Molesworth was appointed a Vice Chancellor's Professorial Fellow at Monash University.

== Recognition ==
In 1989, Molesworth was awarded the Australian Environmental Law Award for being a person who has "made an outstanding contribution to the development and understanding of environmental law in Australia". In 1994, he was appointed a Member of the Order of Australia for his "services to the community in the field of conservation and the environment in particular through the National Trust" and in 1995 he was awarded the State Environment Award by the Government of Victoria in recognition of his "significant contribution to environment protection in Victoria 1970-1995".

In 2003, the Australian Government awarded him the Centenary Medal "For service to the community through heritage and the environment" and the United Nations Association of Australia awarded him the 2003 World Environment Day Award for Outstanding Service to the Environment.

In June 2012, Molesworth was elevated within the Order of Australia by being appointed an Officer of the Order of Australia for "distinguished service to conservation and the environment, to heritage preservation at national and international levels, to the professions and natural resource sectors, and to community health organisations".
