= Robert Hawker Dowling =

Australian artist (1827–1886)

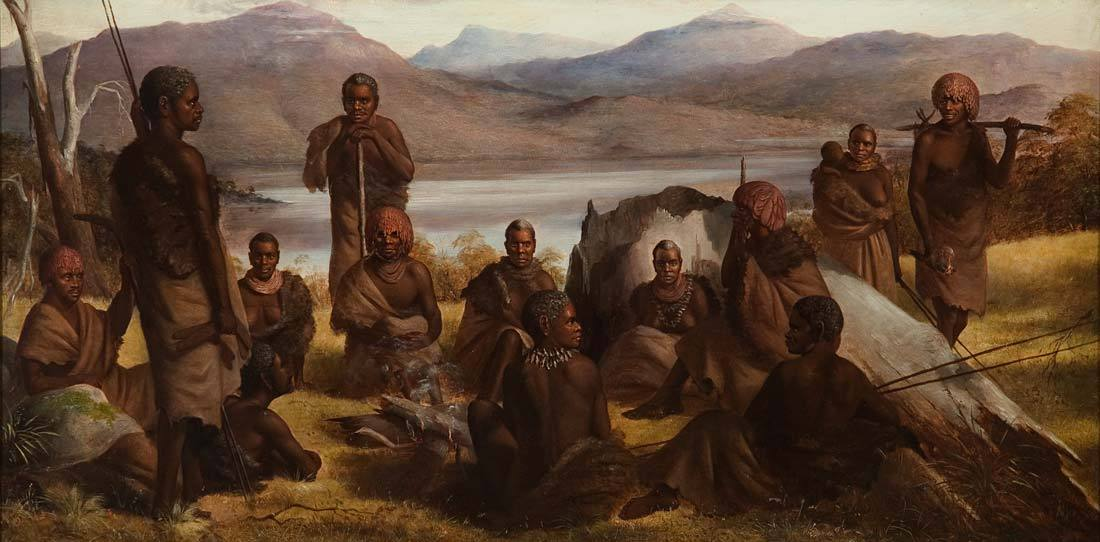
Group of Natives of Tasmania (1859)

Robert Hawker Dowling (1827 – 8 July 1886) was an Australian colonial artist.

== Biography ==
Dowling was born in England the youngest son of Rev. Henry Dowling and his wife Elizabeth, née Darke. He was brought to Launceston, Tasmania with his parents in 1839 in the Janet.

On 2 May 2007, one of Dowling's paintings – Masters George, William and Miss Harriet Ware with the Aborigine Jamie Ware – was bought for A$823,500 by the National Gallery of Victoria.
