= John Hopper (epidemiologist) =

Australian epidemiologist (1950–2024)

John L. Hopper AM
- Born: 20 May 1950
- Died: 28 October 2024 (aged 74); Melbourne, Victoria, Australia
- Citizenship: Australian
- Education: Monash University (MSc, 1974); La Trobe University (PhD, 1980)
- Awards: National Health and Medical Research Council Australia Fellowship (2007)
- Scientific career
- Fields: Genetic epidemiology Statistical genetics
- Institutions: University of Melbourne

John Llewelyn Hopper (20 May 1950 – 28 October 2024) was an Australian genetic epidemiologist and professor at the University of Melbourne, where he was a Professorial Fellow and Director of the Centre for Epidemiology and Biostatistics in the School of Population Global Health. He was also a National Health and Medical Research Council (NHMRC) Senior Principal Research Fellow, and was one of the first nine Australia Fellows chosen by the NHMRC in 2007. In 1990, he became the director of Twins Research Australia (formerly the Australian Twin Registry) and head of the breast cancer unit in the Centre for Epidemiology and Biostatistics in the Melbourne School of Population and Global Health. Hopper died on 28 October 2024, at the age of 74.
