= Max Germaine =

Australian fine art valuer and writer

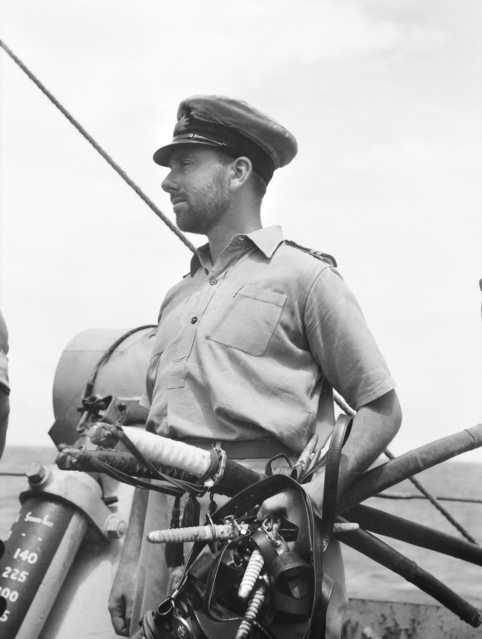
Lieutenant M. Germaine, holding the swords and dirks of the Japanese envoys during pre-surrender of Japan discussions aboard HMAS Vendetta.

Max Germaine OAM (1914, Melbourne, Australia – 12 July 2006, Sydney) was an Australian fine art dealer and writer about art and artists. A founding director of Sotheby's Australia, he is best known for his 650-page Artists & Galleries of Australia (1984/90) which lists nearly 2000 established artists, and Dictionary of Women Artists of Australia (1991).

== Biography ==
Born in Melbourne in 1914, Max Germaine joined a group of men recruited through the Dominion Yachtsmen Scheme to be trained as officers in the Royal Navy for service in the northern hemisphere during World War II. From 1942 he saw service as a sub-lieutenant in the Royal Australian Naval Volunteer Reserve on the destroyer HMS Valorous. Towards the end of 1945, as a lieutenant, Germaine was offered temporary command of the destroyer HMAS Vendetta.

At the age of 53 Max Germaine entered the art scene. He moved to Sydney in 1962 and joined the board of F. R. Strange Pty Ltd, the auctioneers in 1964. In 1967 he started a fine arts division of the company.

After seeing how closed circuit TV was used at Sotheby's in London while completing a decorative arts course in 1967, Germaine pioneered its use at auctions in Australia, starting with the sale of the former Wentworth Hotel in Sydney.

He retired in 1975 to spend time writing books.

In 1994 Max Germaine received a Medal of the Order of Australia for promotion of the arts and artists.
