= Alzheimer's Disease International =

UK not-for-profit organization

Logo of ADI

Alzheimer’s Disease International (ADI) is a not-for-profit, international federation of Alzheimer and dementia associations from around the world. The organization is in official relations with the World Health Organization (WHO). ADI advocates for people living with Alzheimer’s disease and all other types of dementia.

The organisation works to establish dementia as a global, regional and local priority through empowering Alzheimer and dementia associations to advocate for dementia as a national priority, to raise awareness and to offer care and support for people with dementia and their care partners; as well as campaigning for better policy from governments and encourage investment and innovation in dementia research.

The organisation is headquartered in London, UK with an Asia Pacific regional office located in Jakarta, Indonesia and an Americas regional office located in Argentina.

The current Chief Executive Officer is Paola Barbarino.

== History ==
The organisation was formed in 1984, when a group of carers and experts came together to discuss the formation of an international organisation to advocate for Alzheimer’s disease. Representatives from existing Alzheimer associations in the USA (Alzheimer’s Association), UK (Alzheimer’s Society), Australia (Dementia Australia) and Canada (Alzheimer’s Society of Canada) founded ADI. Observers from Belgium (Ligue Nationale Alzheimer Liga) France (France Alzheimer) and Germany (Deutsche Alzheimer Gesellschaft) were also present.

In the early years, the primary role of the organisation was to build international connections between existing associations and other partners, coordinating international activities and sharing information.

Starting in the 1990s, ADI actively sought to expand its membership, focusing on developing and engaging new associations, particularly in low-and middle-income countries. Since its establishment, the organisation’s membership has increased from 4 to over 100 full members .

More recently, the organisation has expanded its focus to public policy and global awareness raising, through publications, campaigns and policy recommendations. To date, it continues to advocate for better policy at international and regional levels, while supporting and developing the capacity of Alzheimer and dementia associations around the world.

== Member Associations ==
In its capacity as a federation, ADI supports existing entities, in addition to new Alzheimer and dementia associations, to develop and strengthen, providing its members with access to information, knowledge and support to further enable them to deliver on their objectives. ADI also provides training courses, known as Alzheimer University and a twinning programme between member associations.

New and emerging associations are invited to join the Membership Development Programme (MDP). The programme lasts for two years, with associations who meet the required criteria being invited to join as an official ADI member.

ADI currently has 105 full members with each member representing their respective country.

== World Alzheimer’s Month ==
Each year ADI and its members organise the global awareness raising campaign World Alzheimer’s Month. The campaign aims to challenge the stigma and discrimination which still exists around the condition.

Started in 2011, World Alzheimer’s Month takes place every September and has a different key message or theme each year, which can be used to raise awareness, educate or challenge the public’s misconceptions about dementia.

World Alzheimer’s Day is on 21 September and was launched in 1994 to coincide with the 10th anniversary of the existence of the organisation. In more recent years, World Alzheimer’s Day has become the focal point of the World Alzheimer’s Month campaign and has often been the day in which ADI launches its World Alzheimer Report (See Publications). World Alzheimer’s Day is officially recognised by the WHO.

== Policy ==
The organisation works to ensure that dementia is considered a global health probity through working with multilateral and regional bodies as well as national advocacy in collaboration with member associations. ADI has official status as a non-state actor with the World Health Organization (WHO).

=== WHO Global Action Plan on the public health response to dementia ===
Together with other strategic partners, ADI collaborated with the WHO to develop the report 'Dementia: a public health priority'. This report was followed by the publication of the ‘World report on ageing and health’ and the 'Strategy and Plan of Action of Dementias in Older Persons for the period of 2015-2019'.

Following this, The WHO commenced the development of a Global Action Plan for dementia'. In 2017, the Global Action Plan on the public health response to dementia was unanimously adopted by all WHO Member States at the WHO 70th World Health Assembly by all WHO Member States.

Since the adoption of the Global Action Plan, the organisation has actively advocated to all WHO Member States to develop, fund and adopt National Dementia Plans, which cover all seven strategic areas.

=== United Nations (UN) ===
ADI advocates to the United Nations (UN) with a particular focus on the rights of older persons and disability, following the adoption of the UN Convention for the Rights of People with Disabilities (CRPD). The document specifically lists dementia as a disability.

Through the UN Open-ended Working Group on ageing, ADI has campaigned for equal rights for those living with dementia and carers in the labour market.

=== Other Multilateral bodies ===
The organisation seeks to establish dementia as a global priority within the G20 and its respective workstreams.

In 2019, Dementia was specifically recognised as a global health priority by G20 leaders in the declaration of the Osaka Summit following advocacy by ADI and member association Alzheimer’s Association Japan (AAJ).

In 2022, as part of the Values20 workstream of the Indonesian presidency of the G20, dementia was included in the Communiqué which was sent to G20 leaders, urging Member States to committee to implementing a national dementia plan and prioritising dementia in their countries.

== Research ==
=== COGNISANCE ===
ADI is an external collaborator in the joint European Union (EU) funded programme for Neurodegenerative Disease Research (JPND). The project’s focus is to co-design dementia diagnosis and post diagnostic care; develop a tool-kit to be disseminated internationally and develop a set of standards to guide the diagnostic and post-diagnostic process.

=== CST International ===
ADI sits on the Advisory Board of the University College London project focusing on work in Brazil, India, and Tanzania. The project aims to develop, test, refine and disseminate implementation strategies for people living with dementia.

=== DISTINCT ===
ADI is an external collaborator in conjunction with nine other academic partners. The project aims to develop a multi-disciplinary, multi-professional education and training research framework for Europe aimed at improving technology and care for people with dementia and their carers. ADI offers expertise in areas of community-based practice and national policies through participating in training and education of the early stage researchers.

=== INDUCT ===
Interdisciplinary network for dementia using current technology (INDUCT) is a partnership across University of Nottingham, University College London, Maastricht University, University of Amsterdam, Karolinska Institutet, Vrije Universiteit Brussel, Charles University, and IDES, Spain, which aims to develop a multi-disciplinary, inter-sectorial educational research framework for Europe to improve technology and care for people with dementia, and to provide the evidence to show how technology can improve the lives of people with dementia. ADI sits on the project’s supervisory board an provides training a yearly summer school focusing on turning research into policy.

=== STRIDE ===
Until the cessation of funding, ADI managed the STRiDE project (Strengthening responses to dementia in developing countries) in partnership with the London School of Economics and Political Science (LSE). The project aimed to build research capacity, develop research evidence into what interventions work most effectively, and to better understand the impact and cost of dementia.

=== 10/66 Dementia Research Group ===
ADI previously convened the now defunct 10/66 Dementia Research Group. The group aimed to develop data on the number of people living with dementia around the world, particularly in low-and-middle-income countries.

== Publications ==
ADI publishes reports and position papers on a number of topics relating to dementia.

=== World Alzheimer Report ===
The World Alzheimer Reports are a comprehensive source of global socioeconomic information on dementia which are published each year on a different topic.

Year	Title	Topic	Reference
2024	TBC		
2023	Reducing Dementia Risk: Never too early, never too late	Examines the drivers behind risk reduction and provides an accessible overview of both modifiable and non-modifiable risk factors as well as the benefits of lifelong risk reduction.	
2022	Life after diagnosis: Navigating treatment, care and support	Global perspective on post-diagnosis care models, barriers and best practice, through expert essays, case studies, commentary and perspectives from people living with dementia and carers.	
2021	Journey through the diagnosis of dementia	Outlines the diagnosis journey through the lens of those living with dementia and carers, clinicians, researchers and academics, and Alzheimer and dementia associations	
2020	Design, Dignity, Dementia: dementia-related design and the built environment	Collates the progress which has been made in dementia-related design to date, including best practice from pioneers and innovators across multiple environments including in home/domestic settings, day and residential care, hospitals and public buildings and spaces.	
2019	Attitudes to dementia	Analyses the results of a global survey of almost 70,000 people on attitudes to dementia, supplemented by expert essays and case studies	
2018	The state of the art of dementia research	Explores a broad cross section of dementia related research areas including basic science, diagnosis, drug discovery, risk reduction and epidemiology. The report also featured progress, innovation and developments in care research.	
2017	No Publication		
2016	Improving healthcare	Critically analysed method to improve the coverage, as well as the quality, of healthcare for people living with dementia, and the costs associated.	
2015	The global impact of dementia	The publication sought to update data on dementia’s global prevalence, incidence and cost, through updating previous systematic reviews. The report also makes key recommendations to provide a global framework for action on dementia. N.B prevalence and cost data contained within the publication have been superseded by the WHO Global Status Report on the Public Health Response to Dementia	
2014	Risk Reduction	The report critically analyses the evidence for the existence of modifiable risk factors for dementia, focusing on potential modifiable risk factors in four key domains: developmental, psychological and psychosocial, lifestyle and cardiovascular conditions. The report makes recommendations to drive public health campaigns and disease prevention strategies.	
2013	Long-term care	The report seeks to inform relevant stakeholders of the necessary attributes of long-term care for those living with dementia. The report includes information on the cost and effectiveness of care and makes recommendations for long-term care policy in dementia.	
2012	Overcoming Stigma	The publication reports on results from an international survey of people living with dementia and carers on their personal experiences of stigma. The report provides information on stigma and dementia, highlights programmes from around the world, and suggests recommendations which could help reduce stigma.	
2011	Early diagnosis and intervention	The report seeks to put forward the argument that there are interventions which can be made in the early stages of dementia that are effective in improving the lives of those living with dementia, some of which may be more effective when started earlier. The report also seeks make an economic argument in favour of earlier diagnosis and timely intervention.	
2010	Economic impact	The World Alzheimer Report 2010 provides and comprehensive global picture of the economic impact of Alzheimer’s disease and dementia. N.B Prevalence and cost data contained within the publication have been superseded by the WHO Global Status Report on the Public Health Response to Dementia	
2009	Prevalence and overview	The report sought to present a comprehensive global prevalence study of dementia and looked at levels of mortality, disability, strain on carers and dependency. The report contains case studies of national dementia plans and information on health service responses, including recommendations that provide a global framework for action on dementia. N.B Prevalence and cost data contained within the publication have been superseded by the WHO Global Status Report on the Public Health Response to Dementia	

=== From Plan to Impact ===
Following the adoption of the Global Action Plan on the Public Health Response to Dementia (See Policy), ADI has tracked the progress of WHO Member States towards achieving the targets of the seven action areas of the Global Action Plan through its report series: From Plan to Impact.

These reports have been typically launched as side events at the WHO’s World Health Assembly in Geneva, both in-person and virtually.

Year	Title	Reference
2024	TBC	
2023	From Plan to Impact VI: Making every step count	
2022	From Plan to Impact V: WHO Global action plan: The time to act is now	
2021	From Plan to Impact IV: Progress towards targets of the WHO Global action plan on dementia	
2020	From Plan to Impact III: Maintaining dementia as a priority in unprecedented times	
2019	From Plan to Impact II: The urgent need for action	
2018	From Plan to Impact: Progress towards targets of the Global action plan on dementia	

== Accreditation ==
In 2021, ADI launched an accreditation programme aiming to support the improvement of care for people with dementia and reduce the variation in the quality of care provided. Successful completion of an evaluation of carers, care trainers and providers of training programmes can result in ADI accreditation, meaning that the training and learning activities have reached the required integrity and quality at all levels.

== Conferences ==
ADI hosts the longest running international conference on dementia. These biennial events often occur in collaboration with ADI member associations. The conferences seek to bring together researchers, scientists, clinicians, allied healthcare professionals, people living with dementia, family members, care professionals, and staff and volunteers of Alzheimer associations.

Since the adoption of the WHO Global Action Plan on the Public Health Response to Dementia (See Policy), the theme of the conference has centred around the seven action areas of the Global Action Plan.

ADI's 36th international conference will be held in Kraków, Poland on the 24-26 April 2024
