= Alexandra =

- Pronunciation: /ˌælɪɡˈzændrə, -ˈzɑːn-/ AL-ig-ZA(H)N-drə
- Gender: Female
- Language: From the Greek Aleksandra, the female form of Alexandros, from alexein meaning "to ward off, keep off, turn away, defend, protect" and aner meaning "man"
- Name day: August 30

Origin
- Meaning: "Defender, protector of mankind"

Other names
- See also: Alejandra, Aleksandra, Alissandra, Alessandra, Oleksandra, Alexandrine, Alex, Alexa, Alexis, Cassandra, Kassandra, Lexi, Lexie, Lexa, Alessia, Alessiya, Alesiya, Olesia, Olesiya, Olessiya, Sandra, Sandrna, Sandrine, Sally, Sandy, Sendy, Shandy, Sasha, Shura, Xandra, Ksandra. The name Alexandria (given name) is similar, though itself means "land, place of Alexander".

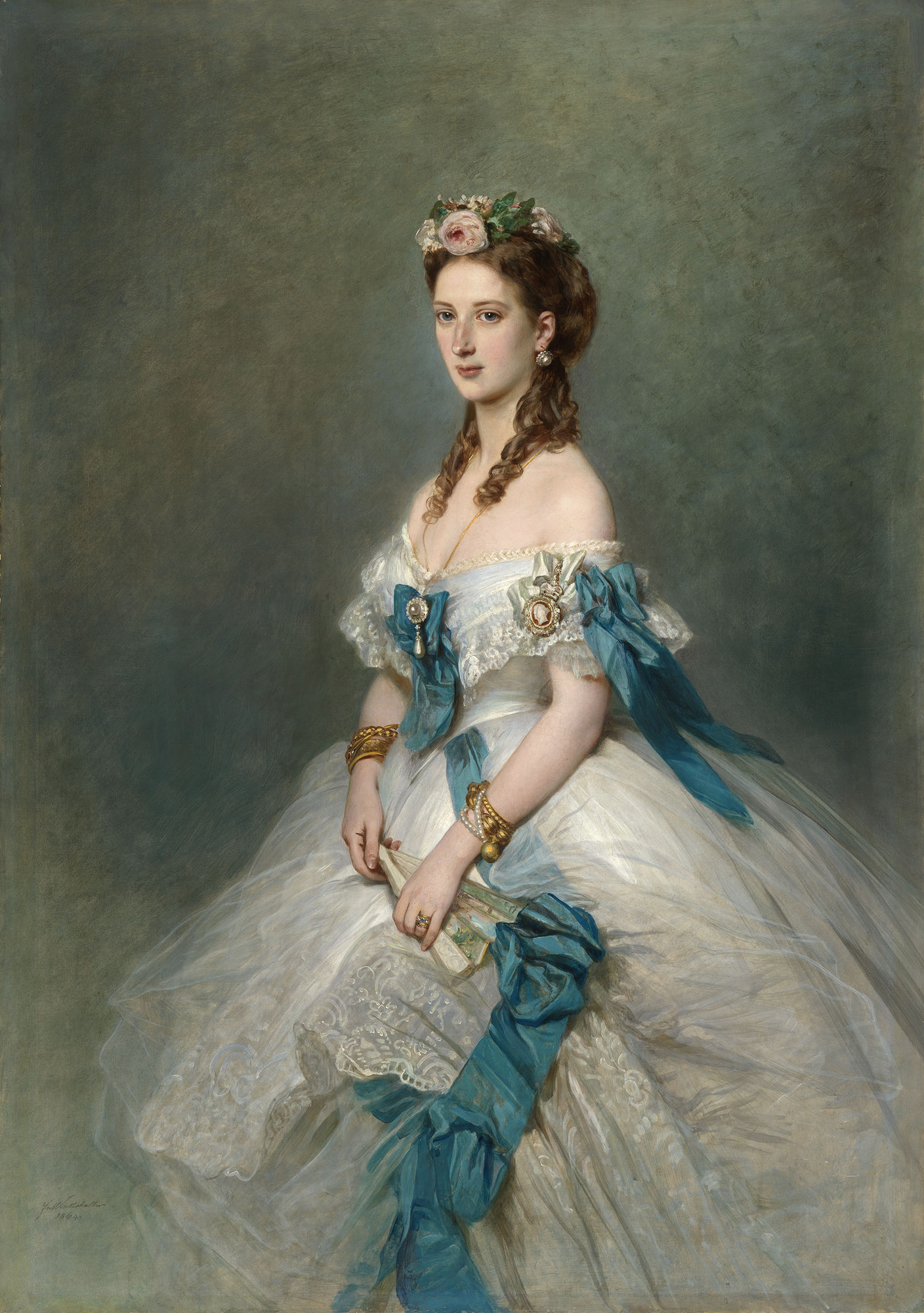
Alexandra of Denmark, Princess of Wales and later Queen Consort of the United Kingdom

Alexandra (Ancient Greek: Ἀλεξάνδρα) (Note: Alexándra, Ancient Greek: [aleksándra] Modern Greek: [aleˈksanðra]) is a female given name of Greek origin. It is the first attested form of its variants, including Alexander (Ancient Greek: Ἀλέξανδρος, Aléxandros). Etymologically, the name is a compound of the Greek verb ἀλέξειν (alexein; meaning 'to defend') and ἀνήρ (anēr; GEN ἀνδρός, andros; meaning 'man'). Thus it may be roughly translated as "defender of man" or "protector of man". The name Alexandra was one of the epithets given to the Greek goddess Hera and as such is usually taken to mean "one who comes to save warriors". The earliest attested form of the name is the Mycenaean Greek 𐀀𐀩𐀏𐀭𐀅𐀨 (a-re-ka-sa-da-ra or /aleksandra/), written in the Linear B syllabic script. Alexandra and its masculine equivalent, Alexander, are both common names in Greece as well as countries where Germanic, Romance, and Slavic languages are spoken.

== Variants ==
- Alastríona (Scottish Gaelic)
- Alejandra, Alejandrina (Spanish)
- Alessandra (Italian, Latvian)
- Alexandrea (English)
- Alexandrina (Portuguese, Roman)
- Alexandrine, Alexandrie (French)
- Aliaksandra (Belarusian)
- Alissandra, Alyssandra (Sicilian)
- Александра (Aleksandra), Александрина (Aleksandrina) (Albanian, Bulgarian, Estonian, Latvian, Lithuanian, Macedonian, Polish, Russian, Serbo-Croatian)
- Олександра (Oleksandra) (Ukrainian)
- اليخاندرا (Alikhandra) (Egyptian Arabic)
- আলেকজান্দ্রা (Ālēkjāndrā) (Bengali)
- Αλεξάνδρα (Greek)

Diminutives

- Aleka (Greek)
- Alessa (Latvian)
- Alessia (Italian)
- Alesya, Alya, Asya, Sanya, Sasha, Sashenka, Shura (Slavic)
- Aleks, Alex (various)
- Alexa (various)
- Alexis (various)
- Alexina
- Alja (Slovene)
- Alyx
- Andra (Romanian)
- Drina
- Allie, Ally (various)
- Lexa
- Lexie, Lexi, Lexy
- Lexine
- Leska (Czech)
- Lesya, Olesya (Ukrainian)
- Ola (Polish)
- Sacha (French)
- Sanda (Serbo-Croatian, Romanian)
- Sandra (various)
- Sandy, Sandie (various)
- Sanja, Sanjica (Serbo-Croatian, Slovene)
- Sascha (German)
- Saskia, Xandra (Dutch)
- Sashka, Saška (Bulgarian, Macedonian, Serbo-Croatian, Slovene)
- Saša (Czech, Serbo-Croatian, Slovak, Slovene)
- Sassa (Swedish)
- Saundra (Lowland Scottish)
- Sondra, Zandra (English)
- Szandra (Hungarian)

== People with the name ==
=== Royalty ===
- Alexandra of Russia (disambiguation), various royal consorts and grand duchesses
- Empress Alexandra (disambiguation)
- Princess Alexandra (disambiguation)
- Queen Alexandra (disambiguation)
  - Alexandra of Denmark (1844–1925), queen consort of the United Kingdom by marriage to Edward VII, King of the United Kingdom
- Alexandra the Maccabee (63 BCE–28 BCE), only child of Hyrcanus II, King of Judaea
- Duchess Alexandra of Oldenburg (1838–1900), eldest child of Duke Peter of Oldenburg

=== Alexandra ===
- Alexandra of Antioch (fl. 4th century), Greek noblewoman and the sister of Calliopius of Antioch
- Alexandra of Lithuania (died 1434), duchess consort of Masovia
- Alexandra of Rome (d. 314), Christian saint and martyr of the Diocletianic persecutions
- Alexandra Aikhenvald (born 1957), Russian–Australian linguist
- Alexandra Aldridge (born 1994), American ice dancer
- Alexandra Allred (born 1965), American author and fitness instructor
- Alexandra Anghel (born 1997), Romanian freestyle wrestler
- Alexandra Ansanelli, American ballet dancer
- Alexandra Anstrell (born 1974), Swedish politician
- Alexandra Araújo (born 1972), Brazilian–born Italian water polo player
- Alexandra Arce (born 1977), Ecuadorian engineer and politician
- Alexandra Aristoteli (born 1997), Australian rhythmic gymnast
- Alexandra Asimaki (born 1988), Greek water polo player
- Alexandra Bachzetsis (born 1974), Greek–Swiss choreographer and visual artist
- Alexandra Backford (1942–2010), Aleut–American painter
- Alexandra Badea (born 1998), Romanian handballer
- Alexandra Balashova (1942–1969), Russian ballet dancer and choreographer
- Alexandra Barré (born 1958), Hungarian–born Canadian sprint kayaker
- Alexandra Barreto (born 1975), American actress
- Alexandra Bastedo (1946–2014), English actress
- Alexandra Beaton (born c. 1994), Canadian actress
- Alexandra Bellow (1935–2025), Romanian–American mathematician
- Alexandra Benado (born 1976), Chilean politician and football player
- Alexandra Béres (born 1976), Hungarian bodybuilder and curler
- Alexandra Berzon (born 1979), American investigative reporter and journalist
- Alexandra Beukes, South African politician
- Alexandra Beverfjord (born 1977), Norwegian journalist, crime fiction writer, and newspaper editor
- Alexandra Bezeková (born 1992), Slovak sprinter
- Alexandra Boltasseva (born 1978), Russian engineer and physicist
- Alexandra Borbély (born 1986), Slovak–Hungarian actress
- Alexandra Botez (born 1995), American–Canadian chess player and Twitch streamer
- Alexandra Bounxouei (born 1987), Laotian–Bulgarian actress, model, and singer
- Alexandra Boyko (1916–1996), Russian tank commander
- Alexandra Bracken (born 1987), American author
- Alexandra Bradshaw (1888–1981), Canadian–American art professor and watercolor artist
- Alexandra Branitskaya (1754–1838), Russian courtier
- Alexandra Braun (born 1983), Venezuelan actress, model, and beauty queen
- Alexandra Breckenridge (born 1982), American actress, model, and photographer
- Alexandra Brewis Slade (born 1965), New Zealand-American anthropologist
- Alexandra Brooks (born 1995), English footballer
- Alexandra Bruce (born 1990), Canadian badminton player
- Alexandra Brushtein (1884–1968), Russian and Soviet writer, playwright, and memoirist
- Alexandra Buch (born 1979), German mixed martial artist
- Alexandra Bugailiskis (born 1956), Canadian diplomat
- Alexandra Bujdoso (born 1990), Hungarian–German sabre fencer
- Alexandra Bunton (born 1993), Australian basketball player
- Alexandra Burghardt (born 1994), German bobsledder and sprinter
- Alexandra Burke (born 1988), British singer
- Alexandra W. Busch (born 1975), German Roman archaeologist
- Alexandra Byrne (born 1962), English costume designer
- Alexandra Căpitănescu (born 2003), Romanian singer and songwriter
- Alexandra Cardenas (born 1976), Colombian composer
- Alexandra Carlisle (1886–1936), English actress and suffragist
- Alexandra Carpenter (born 1994), American ice hockey player
- Alexandra Caso (born 1987), Dominican volleyball player
- Alexandra Cassavetes, American actress and filmmaker
- Alexandra Castillo (born 1971), Chilean–Canadian actress and dancer
- Alexandra Chalupa (born 1976 or 1977), American lawyer and pro–Ukrainian activist
- Alexandra Chambon (born 2000), French rugby player
- Alexandra Chando (born 1986), American actress
- Alexandra Charles (born 1946), Swedish nightclub owner
- Alexandra Chasin (born 1961), American experimental writer
- Alexandra Chaves (born 2001), Canadian actress and dancer
- Alexandra Chekina (born 1993), Russian cyclist
- Alexandra Cheron (1983–2011), Dominican–American actress, businesswoman, model, and socialite
- Alexandra Chidiac (born 1999), Australian footballer
- Alexandra Chong, Jamaican entrepreneur
- Alexandra Chreiteh (born 1987), Lebanese author
- Alexandra Clarke, Canadian ice hockey official
- Alexandra Coletti (born 1983), Monégasque alpine skier
- Alexandra Cordes (1935–1986), German writer
- Alexandra Cousteau (born 1976), French environmental activist and filmmaker
- Alexandra Cunha (born 1962), Mozambican–born Portuguese marine biologist
- Alexandra Cunningham (born 1972 or 1973), American playwright, screenwriter, and television producer
- Alexandra Curtis (born 1991), American beauty queen
- Alexandra Čvanová (1897–1939), Ukrainian–born Czech operatic soprano
- Alexandra Daddario (born 1986), American actress
- Alexandra Dahlström (born 1984), Swedish actress
- Alexandra Dane (born 1940), South African–born English actress
- Alexandra Danilova (1903–1997), Russian ballet dancer
- Alexandra Dariescu (born 1985), Romanian pianist
- Alexandra Dascalu (born 1991), French volleyball player
- Alexandra Daum (born 1986), Austrian alpine skier
- Alexandra David-Néel (1868–1969), French explorer and spiritualist
- Alexandra Davies (born 1977), English–born Australian actress
- Alexandra de la Mora (born 1979), Mexican actress
- Alexandra Dementieva (born 1960), Russian artist
- Alexandra Denisova (1922–2018), Canadian ballet dancer
- Alexandra Deshorties (born 1975), French–Canadian operatic soprano
- Alexandra Dimoglou (born 1981), Greek Paralympic track and field athlete
- Alexandra Dindiligan (born 1997), Romanian handballer
- Alexandra DiNovi (born 1989), American actress
- Alexandra Dinu (born 1981), Romanian actress and television presenter
- Alexandra Diplarou (born 1981), Greek volleyball player
- Alexandra Dobolyi (born 1971), Hungarian politician
- Alexandra Dowling (born 1990), English actress
- Alexandra Duckworth (born 1987), Canadian snowboarder
- Alexandra Duel-Hallen, American electrical engineer
- Alexandra Dulgheru (born 1989), Romanian tennis player
- Alexandra Dunn (born 1967), American lawyer
- Alexandra Eade (born 1998), Australian artistic gymnast
- Alexandra Eala (born 2005), Filipino tennis player
- Alexandra Elbakyan (born 1988), Kazakhstani computer programmer
- Alexandra Eldridge (born 1948), American painter
- Alexandra Engen (born 1988), Swedish cross country cyclist
- Alexandra Eremia (born 1987), Romanian rhythmic gymnast
- Alexandra Ermakova (born 1992), Russian rhythmic gymnast
- Alexandra Escobar (born 1980), Ecuadorian weightlifter
- Alexandra Feigin (born 2002), Bulgarian figure skater
- Alexandra Feracci (born 1992), French karateka
- Alexandra Finder (born 1977), German actress
- Alexandra Fisher (born 1988), Kazakhstani athlete
- Alexandra Flood (born 1990), Australian operatic soprano
- Alexandra Fomina (born 1975), Ukrainian volleyball player
- Alexandra Fominykh (1925–2004), Russian farm worker
- Alexandra Försterling (born 1999), German amateur golfer
- Alexandra Föster (born 2002), German rower
- Alexandra Fouace (born 1979), French archer
- Alexandra Fuentes (born 1978), Puerto Rican actress and radio host
- Alexandra Fusai (born 1973), French tennis player
- Alexandra Gage, Viscountess Gage (born 1969), British lecturer
- Alexandra Gajda (born 1979), English historian
- Alexandra Pavlovna Galitzine (1905–2006), Russian noblewoman
- Alexandra Gallagher (born 1980), English artist
- Alexandra Gardner (born 1967), American composer
- Alexandra Daisy Ginsberg (born 1982), English–South African artist
- Alexandra Goujon (born 1972), French political scientist
- Alexandra Gowie (born 1990), South African–born Hungarian–Canadian ice hockey player
- Alexandra Grande (born 1990), Peruvian karateka
- Alexandra Grant (born 1973), American visual artist
- Alexandra Gripenberg (1857–1913), Finnish activist, author, and newspaper publisher
- Alexandra Gummer (born 1992), Australian soccer player
- Alexandra Hagan (born 1991), Australian rower
- Alexandra Hargreaves (born 1980), Australian rugby player
- Alexandra Harrison (born 2002), French ice hockey player
- Alexandra Hasluck (1908–1993), Australian author and historian
- Alexandra Hedison (born 1969), American actress, director, and photographer
- Alexandra Heidrich, German canoeist
- Alexandra Helbling (born 1993), Sri Lankan–born Swiss Paralympic athlete
- Alexandra Heminsley (born 1976), British journalist and writer
- Alexandra Henao, Venezuelan cinematographer and director
- Alexandra Herbríková (born 1992), Slovak–Czech ice dancer
- Alexandra Hernandez (born 1981), French singer and songwriter
- Alexandra Hidalgo, Venezuelan–American documentarian
- Alexandra Hildebrandt (born 1959), German human rights activist
- Alexandra Mary Hirschi (born 1985), Australian social media personality and vlogger
- Alexandra Hoffman (born 1987), American beauty queen
- Alexandra Hoffmeyer (born 1988), American ice hockey player
- Alexandra Höglund (born 1990), Swedish football player
- Alexandra Holden (born 1977), American actress
- Alexandra Hollá (born 1994), Slovak football player
- Alexandra de Hoop Scheffer, French-Dutch political scientist
- Alexandra van Huffelen (born 1968), Dutch politician
- Alexandra Ashley Hughes (born 1985), Canadian singer and songwriter
- Alexandra Hulley (born 1997), Australian athlete
- Alexandra Hurst (born 1994), Northern Irish soccer player
- Alexandra Huynh (born 1994), Australian soccer player
- Alexandra Ianculescu (born 1991), Romanian–Canadian speed skater
- Alexandra Issayeva (born 1982), Kazakhstani volleyball player
- Alexandra Ivanovskaya (born 1989), Russian beauty queen and model
- Alexandra Jackson (born 1952), Irish–English swimmer
- Alexandra Jiménez (born 1980), Spanish actress
- Alexandra Jóhannsdóttir (born 2000), Icelandic football player
- Alexandra Johnes (born 1976), American documentary film producer
- Alexandra Joner (born 1990), Norwegian dancer and singer
- Alexandra Jupiter (born 1990), French volleyball player
- Alexandra Kalinovská (born 1974), Czech modern pentathlete
- Alexandra Kamieniecki (born 1996), Polish figure skater
- Alexandra Kamp (born 1966), German actress and model
- Alexandra Kapustina (born 1984), Russian ice hockey player
- Alexandra Kasser (born 1967), American attorney and politician
- Alexandra Kavadas (born 1983), Greek football player
- Alexandra Kehayoglou (born 1981), Argentine textile artist
- Alexandra Kenworthy (born 1932), American voice actress
- Alexandra Keresztesi (born 1983), Hungarian–born Argentine sprint canoer
- Alexandra Kerry (born 1973), American filmmaker
- Alexandra Killewald (born 1983), American sociology professor
- Alexandra Kiroi-Bogatyreva (born 2002), Australian Olympic rhythmic gymnast
- Alexandra Kim (1885–1918), Russian–Korean revolutionary political activist
- Alexandra Kleeman (born 1986), American writer
- Alexandra Kluge (1937–2017), German actress
- Alexandra Koefoed (born 1978), Norwegian sailor
- Alexandra Kolesnichenko (born 1992), Uzbekistani tennis player
- Alexandra Kollontai (1872–1952), Russian politician
- Alexandra Konofalskaya (born 1986), Belarusian sand animation artist
- Alexandra Korelova (born 1977), Russian equestrian
- Alexandra Korolkova (born 1984), Russian typeface designer
- Alexandra Kosinski (born 1989), American long-distance runner
- Alexandra Kosteniuk (born 1984), Russian chess grandmaster
- Alexandra Kotur, American fashion journalist
- Alexandra Kropotkin (1887–1966), Russian–American writer
- Alexandra Krosney, American actress
- Alexandra Kunová (born 1992), Slovak figure skater
- Alexandra Kutas (born 1993), Ukrainian model
- Alexandra Labelle (born 1996), Canadian ice hockey player
- Alexandra Lacrabère (born 1987), French handballer
- Alexandra Lamy (born 1971), French actress
- Alexandra Langley (born 1992), English badminton player
- Alexandra Lapierre, French author
- Alexandra Maria Lara (born 1978), Romanian–German actress
- Alexandra Larochelle (born 1993), Canadian writer
- Alexandra Larsson (born 1986), Swedish–Argentine model
- Alexandra Lazarowich, Cree–Canadian director and producer
- Alexandra Lebenthal (born 1964), American businesswoman
- Alexandra Leclère, French director and screenwriter
- Alexandra Lehti (born 1996), Finnish singer, known as Lxandra
- Alexandra Leitão (born 1973), Portuguese law professor and politician
- Alexandra Lemoine (born 1928), French artistic gymnast
- Alexandra Lencastre (born 1965), Portuguese actress
- Alexandra Lethbridge (born 1987), Hong Kong–born English photographer
- Alexandra Levit (born 1976), American writer
- Alexandra Lisney (born 1987), Australian cyclist and rower
- Alexandra London (born 1973), French actress
- Alexandra Longová (born 1994), Slovak archer
- Alexandra López (born 1989), Spanish soccer player
- Alexandra Louis (born 1983), French lawyer and politician
- Alexandra Lúgaro (born 1981), Puerto Rican attorney, businesswoman, and politician
- Alexandra Lukin (born 1998), New Zealand field hockey player
- Alexandra Lunca (born 1995), Romanian soccer player
- Alexandra Lydon, American actress
- Alexandra Măceșanu (2003–2019), Romanian murder victim
- Alexandra Madeleine, Seychellois judge
- Alexandra Makárová (born 1985), Slovak-Austrian filmmaker
- Alexandra Makovskaya (1837–1915), Russian landscape painter
- Alexandra Manly (born 1998), Australian cyclist
- Alexandra Mařasová (born 1965), Czech alpine skier
- Alexandra Mardell (born 1993), English actress
- Alexandra Marinescu (born 1982), Romanian artistic gymnast
- Alexandra Marinina (born 1957), Russian writer
- Alexandra Martin (born 1968), French politician
- Alexandra Marzo (born 1968), Brazilian actress and screenwriter
- Alexandra Mavrokordatou (1605–1684), Greek intellectual
- Alexandra Mazur (born 1986), Russian beauty queen
- Alexandra Meissnitzer (born 1973), Austrian alpine ski racer
- Alexandra Mendès (born 1963), Canadian politician
- Alexandra Merkulova (born 1995), Russian rhythmic gymnast
- Alexandra Micu, Romanian fashion model
- Alexandra Miller (born 1973), American businesswoman and politician
- Alexandra Milton (born 1967), French artist and illustrator
- Alexandra Mîrca (born 1993), Moldovan archer
- Alexandra Mitroshina (born 1994), Russian journalist
- Alexandra Mitsotaki (born 1956), Greek activist and entrepreneur
- Alexandra Moreno (born 2000), Spanish racing cyclist
- Alexandra Morgenrood (born 1940), Zimbabwean diver
- Alexandra Morrison, Canadian photographer
- Alexandra Morton (born 1957), American conservation activist and marine biologist
- Alexandra Mousavizadeh (born 1970), Danish economist
- Alexandra Mueller (born 1988), American tennis player
- Alexandra Muñoz (born 1992), Peruvian volleyball player
- Alexandra Munteanu (born 1980), Romanian alpine skier
- Alexandra Naclerio (born 2005), Italian rhythmic gymnast
- Alexandra Najarro (born 1993), Canadian figure skater
- Alexandra Nancarrow (born 1993), Australian tennis player
- Alexandra Ndolo (born 1986), German–born Kenyan épée fencer
- Alexandra Nechita (born 1985), Romanian–American cubist painter and philanthropist
- Alexandra Nekvapilová (1919–2014), Czech alpine skier
- Alexandra Neldel (born 1976), German actress
- Alexandra Nemich (born 1995), Kazakhstani synchronized swimmer
- Alexandra Nereïev (born 1976), French painter and sculptor
- Alexandra Newton, South African pharmacology professor
- Alexandra Niepel (born 1970), British tennis player
- Alexandra Nikiforova (born 1993), Russian actress
- Alexandra Nouchet (born 1998), French para-athlete
- Alexandra Obolentseva (born 2001), Russian chess player
- Alexandra Ocles (born 1979), Ecuadorian educator and politician
- Alexandra Oliver (born 1970), Canadian poet
- Alexandra Olsson (born 1998), Finnish handballer
- Alexandra Opachanova (born 1989), Kazakh rower
- Alexandra Oquendo (born 1984), Puerto Rican volleyball player
- Alexandra Ordolis (born 1986), Greek–Canadian actress
- Alexandra Osborne (born 1995), Australian tennis player
- Alexandra Panova (born 1989), Russian tennis player
- Alexandra Papageorgiou (born 1980), Greek hammer thrower
- Alexandra Park (born 1989), Australian actress
- Alexandra Parks (born 1984), English singer-songwriter
- Alexandra Pascalidou (born 1970), Greek–Swedish author and columnist
- Alexandra Paschalidou-Moreti (1912–2010), Greek architect
- Alexandra Patsavas (born 1968), Greek–American music supervisor
- Alexandra Pelosi (born 1970), American documentarian and journalist
- Alexandra Penney, American artist, author, and journalist
- Alexandra Perper (born 1991), Moldovan tennis player
- Alexandra Petkovski, Canadian composer
- Alexandra Petrova (1980–2000), Russian beauty queen and model
- Alexandra Picatto (born 1983), American accountant and child actress
- Alexandra Pierce (1934–2021), American composer and pianist
- Alexandra Piscupescu (born 1994), Romanian rhythmic gymnast
- Alexandra Podkolzina (born 1985), Russian–American tennis player
- Alexandra Podryadova (born 1989), Kazakhstani judoka
- Alexandra Polivanchuk (born 1990), Swedish deaf swimmer
- Alexandra Pomales (born 1995), American actress
- Alexandra Popp (born 1991), German soccer player
- Alexandra Potter (born 1970), English author
- Alexandra Poulovassilis, Greek–English computer scientist
- Alexandra Powers, American actress
- Alexandra Pringle (born 1953), British publisher
- Aleksandra Przegalińska (born 1982), Polish philosopher and futurist
- Alexandra Quinn (born 1973), Canadian pornographic actress
- Alexandra Radius (born 1942), Dutch ballet dancer
- Alexandra Raeva (born 1992), Russian curler
- Alexandra Raffé (born 1955), Canadian film and television producer
- Alexandra Ramniceanu (born 1976), French film producer and screenwriter
- Alexandra Rapaport (born 1971), Swedish actress
- Alexandra Razarenova (born 1990), Russian triathlete
- Alexandra Recchia (born 1988), French karateka
- Alexandra Reid (born 1989), American rapper and singer
- Alexandra Rexová (born 2005), Slovak blind alpine skier
- Alexandra Richards (born 1986), American artist and model
- Alexandra Richter (born 1967), Brazilian actress
- Alexandra Rickham (born 1981), Jamaican–born English Paralympic sailor
- Alexandra Ridout (born 1998), English jazz trumpeter
- Alexandra Ripley (1934–2004), American writer
- Alexandra Roach (born 1987), Welsh actress
- Alexandra Robbins, American author, journalist, and lecturer
- Alexandra Roche, Lady Roche (born 1934), British philanthropist
- Alexandra Rochelle (born 1983), French volleyball player
- Alexandra Rodionova (born 1984), Russian bobsledder
- Alexandra Rojas (born 1995), American activist and political commentator
- Alexandra Rosenfeld (born 1986), French beauty queen and model
- Alexandra Rotan (born 1996), Norwegian singer and songwriter
- Alexandra Rout (born 1993), New Zealand figure skater
- Alexandra Rozenman (born 1971), Russian–born American graphic designer, illustrator, and painter
- Alexandra Rutherford, Canadian psychology professor
- Alexandra Rutlidge (born 1988), English water polo player
- Alexandra Saduakassova (born 2002), Kazakh sport shooter
- Alexandra Sahlen (born 1982), American soccer player
- Alexandra Salmela (born 1980), Slovak author
- Alexandra Salvador (born 1995), Canadian–born Ecuadorian soccer player
- Alexandra Savior (born 1995), American singer and songwriter
- Alexandra Schepisi, Australian actress
- Alexandra Schörghuber (born 1958), German entrepreneur
- Alexandra Seceleanu, Romanian mathematician
- Alexandra Sharp (born 1997), Australian basketball player
- Alexandra Shevchenko (born 1988), Ukrainian radical feminist activist
- Alexandra Shimo, Canadian writer
- Alexandra Shipp, American actress and singer
- Alexandra Shiryayeva (born 1983), Russian beach volleyball player
- Alexandra Shiva, American documentarian
- Alexandra Shulman (born 1957), English journalist
- Alexandra Sicoe (1932–2019), Romanian sprinter
- Alexandra Sidorovici (1906–2000), Romanian politician
- Alexandra Silber, American actress, educator, singer, and writer
- Alexandra Silk (born 1963), American pornographic actress
- Alexandra Silocea (born 1984), Romanian–born French pianist
- Alexandra Silva (born 1984), Portuguese computer scientist
- Alexandra Slade, American actress
- Alexandra Smirnoff (1838–1913) Finnish pomologist
- Alexandra Sobo (born 1987), Romanian volleyball player
- Alexandra Socha (born 1990), American actress
- Alexandra Sokoloff, American novelist and screenwriter
- Alexandra Soler (born 1983), French artistic gymnast
- Alexandra Sorina (1899–1973), Belarusian actress
- Alexandra Soumm (born 1989), Russian–born French violinist
- Alexandra Sourla (born 1973), Greek equestrian
- Alexandra Speers (born 1987), retired Irish field hockey player
- Alexandra Stan (born 1989), Romanian singer
- Alexandra Stepanova (born 1995), Russian ice dancer
- Alexandra Stevenson (born 1980), American tennis player
- Alexandra Stewart (born 1939), Canadian actress
- Alexandra Stréliski (born 1985), Canadian composer and pianist
- Alexandra Styron, American author and professor
- Alexandra Subțirică (born 1987), Romanian handballer
- Alexandra Suda (born 1981), Canadian art historian
- Alexandra Takounda (born 2000), Cameroonian soccer player
- Alexandra Talomaa (born 1975), Swedish songwriter
- Alexandra Tavernier (born 1993), French hammer thrower
- Alexandra Techet, American marine engineer
- Alexandra Tegleva (1894–1955), Russian nursemaid
- Alexandra Tessier (born 1993), Canadian rugby player
- Alexandra Thein (born 1963), German politician
- Alexandra Tilley (born 1993), Scottish alpine ski racer
- Alexandra Timoshenko (born 1972), Ukrainian rhythmic gymnast
- Alexandra Tolstaya (1884–1979), Russian secretary and the youngest daughter of Leo Tolstoy
- Alexandra Touretski (born 1994), Swiss freestyle swimmer
- Alexandra Trică (born 1985), Romanian volleyball player
- Alexandra Trofimov (born 1999), Romanian soccer player
- Alexandra Trusova (born 2004), Russian figure skater
- Alexandra Truwit (born 2000), American Paralympic swimmer
- Alexandra Tsiavou (born 1985), Greek rower
- Alexandra Tüchi (born 1983), Austrian bobsledder
- Alexandra Tydings (born 1972), American actress
- Alexandra Udženija (born 1975), Serbian–Czech politician
- Alexandra Vafina (born 1990), Russian ice hockey player
- Alexandra Valetta-Ardisson (born 1976), French politician
- Alexandra Vandernoot (born 1965), Belgian actress
- Alexandra Vasilieva (born 1995), Russian figure skater
- Alexandra Vela, Ecuadorian lawyer and politician
- Alexandra Verbeek (born 1973), Dutch sailor
- Alexandra Vieira (born 1966), Portuguese teacher and politician
- Alexandra Viney (born 1992), Australian Paralympic rower
- Alexandra Vinogradova (born 1988), Russian volleyball player
- Alexandra Völker (born 1989), Swedish politician
- Alexandra von der Weth (born 1968), German operatic soprano
- Alexandra von Dyhrn (1873–1945), German author and genealogist
- Alexandra von Fürstenberg (born 1972), Hong Kong–born American entrepreneur, heiress, and socialite
- Alexandra Voronin (1905–1993), Russian wife of Vidkun Quisling
- Alexandra Vydrina (1988–2021), Russian linguist
- Alexandra Wager (born c. 1950), American child actress and the daughter of Michael Wager
- Alexandra Wallace (born 1975 or 1976), American news media executive
- Alexandra Walsham (born 1966), English–Australian historian
- Alexandra Waluszewski (born 1956), Swedish professor and organizational theorist
- Alexandra Waterbury, American ballet dancer and model
- Alexandra Wedgwood (born 1938), English architectural historian
- Alexandra Wejchert (1921–1995), Polish–Irish sculptor
- Alexandra Wenk (born 1995), German swimmer
- Alexandra Wescourt (born 1975), English actress
- Alexandra Wester (born 1994), Gambian–born German long jumper
- Alexandra Wilke (born 1996), German basketball player
- Alexandra Williams, American rugby player
- Alexandra Wiwcharuk (born 1962), Canadian murder victim
- Alexandra Wong (born 1956), Hong Kong activist
- Alexandra Worden (born 1970), American genome scientist and microbial ecologist
- Alexandra Worisch (born 1965), Austrian synchronized swimmer
- Alexandra Zabelina (1937–2022), Soviet fencer
- Alexandra Zaharias (born 1929), American ballet teacher
- Alexandra Zapruder (born 1969), American author and editor
- Alexandra Zaretsky (born 1987), Israeli ice dancer
- Alexandra Zarini (born 1985), Italian–American daughter of Patricia Gucci
- Alexandra Zazzi (born 1966), Italian–born Swedish chef, journalist, and television presenter
- Alexandra Zertsalova (born 1982), Kyrgyz swimmer
- Alexandra Zhukovskaya (1842–1899), Russian–German lady-in-waiting
- Alexandra Zimmermann, English conservation scientist
- Alexandra Zvorigina (born 1991), Russian ice dancer

=== Aleksandra ===
- Aleksandra Antonova, various people
- Aleksandra Avramović (born 1982), Serbian volleyball player
- Aleksandra Crnčević (born 1987), Serbian volleyball player
- Aleksandra Crvendakić (born 1996), Serbian basketball player
- Aleksandra Cvetićanin (born 1993), Serbian volleyball player
- Aleksandra Dimitrova (born 2000), Russian chess master
- Aleksandra Dulkiewicz (born 1979), Polish lawyer
- Aleksandra Fedoriva (born 1988), Russian athlete
- Aleksandra Gajewska (born 1971), Polish theatre director, actress, and politician
- Aleksandra Gajewska (born 1989), Polish politician
- Aleksandra Isaeva (born 2004), Ukrainian dancer
- Aleksandra Izmailovich (1878–1941), Belarusian revolutionary
- Aleksandra Klepaczka (born 2000), Polish beauty pageant titleholder
- Aleksandra Adamovna Kolemina-Bacheracht (1854–1941), Polish novelist
- Aleksandra Kosiorek (born 1985), Polish politician and jurist
- Aleksandra Krunić (born 1993), Serbian tennis player
- Aleksandra Leo (born 1981), Polish politician and lawyer
- Aleksandra Maltsevskaya (born 2002), Russian chess master
- Aleksandra Melnichenko (born 1977), Serbian billionaire, former singer, and model who is the wife of the Russian billionaire Andrey Melnichenko
- Aleksandra Perišić (born 2002), Serbian taekwondo practitioner
- Aleksandra Prijović (born 1995), Serbian pop-folk singer
- Aleksandra Przegalińska (born 1982), Polish futurist
- Aleksandra Ranković (born 1980), Serbian volleyball player
- Aleksandra Shchekoldina (born 2002), retired Russian gymnast
- Aleksandra Shevchenko (1926–2000), Ukrainian scientist-zootechnician and milkmaid
- Aleksandra Stepanović (born 1994), Serbian volleyball player
- Aleksandra Stubleva, Bulgarian karateka
- Aleksandra Szwed (born 1990), Polish actress, television presenter. and actress
- Aleksandra Uznańska-Wiśniewska (born 1994), Polish–Thai politician, political scientist, and humanitarian
- Aleksandra Vukajlović (born 1997), Serbian handball player
- Aleksandra Woźniak (born 1975), Polish actress and psychologist
- Aleksandra Wozniak (born 1987), Canadian tennis player
- Aleksandra Zaitseva (born 1999), Russian para athlete
- Aleksandra Ziółkowska-Boehm (born 1949), Polish writer

== Fictional characters ==
- Alexandra, Nikita character
- Alexandra Borgia, an Assistant District Attorney in Law & Order, played by Annie Parisse
- Alexandra Cabot, an Assistant District Attorney in Law & Order: Special Victims Unit, played by Stephanie March
- Alexandra Eames, a detective in Law & Order Criminal Intent, played by Kathryn Erbe
- Aleksandra Billewicz, a character in Deluge by Henryk Sienkiewicz

== See also ==
- Alexander
- Alexandria (given name)
