= Kavadas =

Kavadas is a surname. Notable people with the surname include:

- Alexandra Kavadas (born 1983), American–Greek footballer
- Niko Kavadas (born 1998), American baseball player
