= London Knowledge Lab =

Research centre in Bloomsbury, London between 2004 and 2016

Coordinates: 51.5216°N 0.1177°W

- Type: Learning with Digital Technologies research centre
- Established: 2004
- Director: Richard Noss (UCL Institute of Education) and Alexandra Poulovassilis (Birkbeck)
- Address: London Knowledge Lab, 23-29 Emerald Street, UK, WC1N 3QS, London, United Kingdom
- Campus: Urban
- Affiliations: University of London
- Website: http://www.lkl.ac.uk/

London Knowledge Lab was a research centre in Bloomsbury, London. It was founded in 2004 as a collaboration between the Institute of Education and Birkbeck, University of London. It was an interdisciplinary research centre, bringing together over 50 researchers from both social sciences and computer science backgrounds. The Institute of Education and Birkbeck announced the end of their collaboration in February 2016. Both institutions are continuing the work in their own separate Knowledge Lab research centres.

== Funding ==
The London Knowledge Lab was mainly funded by £6 million grant from the Science Research Investment Fund. In addition, it ran over 120 research projects, funded by a variety of funding bodies, including EPSRC, ESRC, Jisc, and the EU, amongst others. The Technology Enhanced Learning research programme, a major UK educational research programme, was directed from the Knowledge Lab.

== Research themes ==
Research at London Knowledge Lab focused upon three themes:

- Automating support for learning, collaboration and knowledge building
- Understanding how digital technologies and media affect educational practice, work, culture and society
- Developing innovative methodologies for investigation of the use and effect of digital technologies
