= Alexandria (given name) =

- Pronunciation: /ˌælɪɡˈzændriə, -ˈzɑːn-/ AL-ig-ZA(H)N-dree-ə
- Gender: Female

Origin
- Origin: Ancient Greek
- Meaning: "defender of mankind" or "defender of men"

Other names
- Related names: Alex; Alexa; Alexander; Alexandra; Lexi

Alexandria is a feminine given name, derived from Alexander the Great and the towns he named, most notably the city of Alexandria, Egypt.

Alexandria was the 352nd most popular name for girls born in the United States in 2021. For the US in the years since 1900, it was most popular in 1993 when it ranked 69th. It was not in the top 1,000 girls' baby names before 1969.

== People named Alexandria ==
- Alexandria Anderson (born 1987), American runner
- Alexandria Boehm, American scientist
- Alexandria Bombach, American filmmaker
- Alexandria Constantinova Szeman (born 1956), American author
- Alexandria Gonzales, Filipino politician
- Alexandria Haber, Canadian playwright
- Alexandria Karlsen (born 1978), American actress
- Alexandria Kautzman (born 2005), American rhythmic gymnast
- Alexandria Loutitt (born 2004), Canadian ski jumper
- Alexandria Maillot, Canadian actress
- Alexandria Masse (born 2000), Canadian textile artist
- Alexandria Mills (born 1992), American beauty pageant winner
- Alexandria Ocasio-Cortez (born 1989), American politician
- Alexandria Perkins (born 2000), Australian swimmer
- Alexandria Smith, American artist
- Alexandria Town (born 1995), Canadian wrestler
- Alexandria Villaseñor (born 2005), American climate activist
- Alexandria Wailes (born 1975), American actress

== See also ==
- Alexandrea Owens-Sarno, an American actress
- Alexandria (disambiguation)
