= Alexandra Thein =

German politician of the Free Democratic Party of Germany (born 1963)

Alexandra Thein (born 5 October 1963 in Bochum) is a German politician of the Free Democratic Party of Germany who has served as a Member of the European Parliament since 2009.

== Early life and career ==
She grew up in Saarland, studied law in Saarbrücken and at the Graduate Institute of International and Development Studies in Geneva, and has since been working as a lawyer and notary in her home city of Berlin.

== Political career ==
Thein entered politics with her first run for public office in 2009, when she was elected to the European Parliament.

In parliament, Thein served on the Committee on Legal Affairs as a member and in the Committee on Constitutional Affairs as a substitute member. She was a member of the Delegations for relations with the Palestinian Legislative Council and with Iraq and a substitute member of the Delegation for relations with Afghanistan.

Her endorsement of the 2013 elections in Azerbaijan, judged to be fraudulent by professional election observation bodies, has been criticized by independent commentators. According to her disclosure form, Thein took part in this election observation as part of a trip organized by a pro-Azerbaijan lobby group.

In 2015, Thein resigned as chair of the FDP in Berlin, citing health reasons.

== See also ==
- 2009 European Parliament election in Germany
