= Alexandra Larochelle =

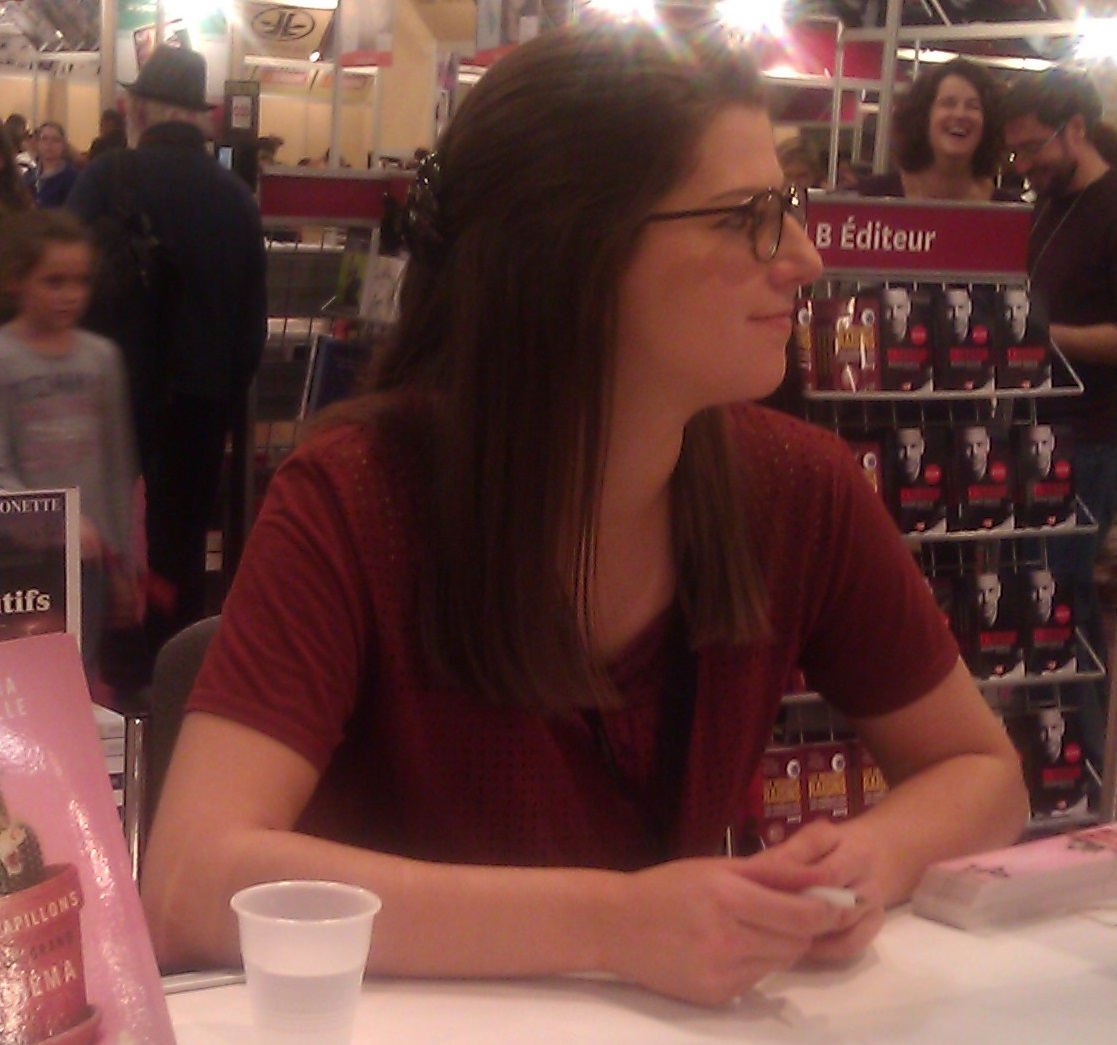
- Born: 5 May 1993 (age 33); Laval, Quebec, Canada
- Writing career
- Language: French
- Genre: novnels

Alexandra Larochelle (born 1993) is a Canadian writer. In 2004, at the age of ten, she published her first novel, Beyond the Universe, which she had written the year before. It was the first work and she has published five other novels in this series.

Larochelle was among the guests of honor at the 2005 Quebec International Book Fair, the 2005 edition of the Montreal Book Fair, and the 2008 edition of the Rimouski Book Fair. In January 2006, Christal Films announced that Larochelle's first three novels would be made into films. Larochelle participates in the show Le Livre Show in Vox. She collaborates with Cool magazines!, and Between the lines.

In 2015, she published the novel Des papillons pis de la gravity at Libre Expression. The second volume of the series was released at the beginning of October 2016 under the English title of: Butterflies and the Big Cinema.

== Works ==
- Trucs de peur T.1 : Perdues dans le noir, Les Éditions de la Bagnole (2019) (ISBN 9782897143275)
- Trucs de peur T.2 : Un fantôme trop bavard, Les Éditions de la Bagnole (2019) (ISBN 9782897143404)
- Trucs de peur T.3 : Le mystère de la sorcière, Les Éditions de la Bagnole (2020) (ISBN 9782897144050)
- Trucs de peur T.4 : Le lac des marins disparus, Les Éditions de la Bagnole (2021) (ISBN 9782897144371)
- Trucs de peur T.5 : Le train de l'horreur, Les Éditions de la Bagnole (2021) (ISBN 9782897144890)
- Premier rendez-vous T.1 : Le pire meilleur ami, Éditions Michel Quintin (2020) (ISBN 9782897624958)
- Premier rendez-vous T.2 : L'amour, c'est du caca, Éditions Michel Quintin (2020) (ISBN 9782897625146)
- Premier rendez-vous T.3 : Seuls au monde, Éditions Michel Quintin (2021) (ISBN 9782897625481)
- Premier rendez-vous T.4 : Toast à l'amour perdu, Éditions Michel Quintin (2021) (ISBN 9782897625948)
- Val-Caduc: La ville des morts, Glénat Québec (2020) (ISBN 9782924997178)
- Troisième étoile T.1 : De L.A. à Laval, Les Éditions de la Bagnole (2018) (ISBN 9782897142995)
- Troisième étoile T.2 : La revanche d'une fille trahie, Les Éditions de la Bagnole (2019) (ISBN 9782897143008)
- Troisième étoile T.3 : Le grand pardon?, Les Éditions de la Bagnole (2019) (ISBN 9782897143497)
- Des papillons pis de la gravité, Libre Expression (2015)
- Des papillons pis du grand cinéma (2016) (ISBN 9782764811825)
- Des papillons pis des fins du monde (2018) (ISBN 9782764812938)
- Au-delà de l'univers Éditions du Trécarré (2004) (ISBN 2-89568-259-3)
- Mission périlleuse en Erianigami Éditions du Trécarré (Au-delà de l'univers - tome 2) (2004) (ISBN 2-89568-257-7)
- La Clé de l'énigme (Au-delà de l'univers - tome 3) Éditions du Trécarré (2005) (ISBN 2-89568-284-4)
- Quiproquo et sorcellerie (Au-delà de l'univers - tome 4) Éditions du Trécarré (2006) (ISBN 2-89568-320-4)
- Épreuve infernale (Au-delà de l'univers - tome 5) Éditions du Trécarré (2006) (ISBN 2-89568-311-5)
- Lorafil - L'avenir à l'agonie (Au-delà de l'univers - tome 6) Éditions du Trécarré (2007) (ISBN 978-2-89568-351-3)
