= Alexandra Kehayoglou =

Argentine textile artist

- Born: 1981 (age 44–45); Buenos Aires, Argentina
- Occupation: Textile artist
- Website: Official website

Alexandra Kehayoglou (born 1982) is an Argentine textile artist. She is best known for her large-scale carpets and tapestries reflecting natural landscapes, works which address the topic of climate change. She won the Konex Award from Argentina in 2022.

== Biography ==
Kehayoglou was born in 1982 in Buenos Aires, Argentina to a family of carpet-makers. Her grandparents immigrated from Isparta (present-day Turkey) in the 1920s, bringing with them their practice of making Ottoman-style rugs. Her grandmother founded a carpet-making company, El Espartano. Kehayoglou went on to incorporate the family tradition of carpet-making into her own artistic practice.

She grew up in a house in Argentina surrounded by a garden, a forest, a farm, and a river, which influenced her artistic interest in nature and the Argentine landscape.

She currently lives and works in Athens.

== Meaning and origins of her work ==
Her technique relies heavily on the hand-tufting system, a laborious type of textile weaving used in carpet-making. The subject matter links her with her families traditions, specifically her grandmother. She uses recycled scrap yarn from her families factory to create her work.

Her subject matter is the Argentine landscape that she calls home. She often travels to new locations to research and study the landscapes she depicts. Her work represents places which have been impacted by climate change or damaged by human activity. Her work has become known for its call for environmental preservation and awareness.

== Works ==
For Paris Fashion Week in 2015, Dries van Noten ordered a tufted rug from Kehayoglou for a catwalk that covered the entire stage. The carpet consisted of four parts and totaled 144 square meters. It was completed by three 10-member teams in 16 days. The carpet is an abstraction of the Argentine landscape where she lives.

Her 2016 work No Longer Creek documents the Raggio Creek, a creek north of Buenos Aires where she used to go running, whose banks have been damaged by human activity. Her work represents what the creek used to look like to reflect the greenery and landscape that has been lost. It calls the viewer to experience this environment that no longer exists and reconnect with lost nature.

In 2017 she completed Santa Cruz River, titled after the Santa Cruz River in Argentina, for the National Gallery of Victoria Triennial. The river was the proposed site of two major hydroelectric dams.

Her 2018 series titled Prayer Rugs addresses the landscapes of the Parana Delta Wetlands, which has been damaged by deforestation, hunting, the introduction of foreign species of fauna, and both domestic and industrial pollution. Her work documents the "micro-narratives" of the surviving plants and wildlife in this region.
