= Alexandra Levit =

American writer

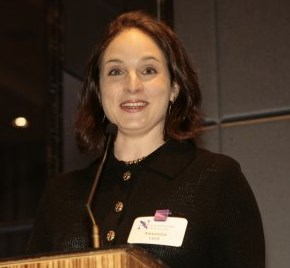
- Levit in 2008
- Born: 1976 (age 49–50); Minneapolis, Minnesota
- Education: Northwestern University
- Occupations: Writer, journalist, consultant
- Years active: 2004–present
- Children: 2
- Website: alexandralevit.com

Alexandra Levit (born 1976) is an American writer, consultant, speaker, workplace expert, and futurist. She has written ten business and workplace books and writes as a syndicated columnist for the Wall Street Journal.

== Early life and education ==
Levit was born in Minneapolis, Minnesota, and raised in Gaithersburg, Maryland.

She graduated from Watkins Mill High School as the salutatorian of her class. During high school, she was active in environmental causes and acted in several theatrical productions.

In 1998, she graduated from Northwestern University with a degree in psychology.

== Career ==
In her early career, Levit worked in New York as a public relations representative for a Long Island software company. She went on to become a vice president at public relations firm Edelman, with a focus on creating online campaigns in the early days of social media. She left Edelman in 2008.

In 2003, she used her workplace experiences to write a guide for young professionals navigating the business world. The book, They Don't Teach Corporate in College, was published in 2004, and started Levit's career as a workplace consultant, speaker, columnist, and author.

In 2004, Levit founded Inspiration at Work, a business and workplace consulting firm based in Chicago that advised universities, nonprofit associations, and companies. From 2009 to 2010, she wrote a nationally syndicated career advice column for The Wall Street Journal. From 2008 to 2011, she wrote The Corporate Freshman column for the Huffington Post.

She has written for Forbes, Fortune, Business Insider, Fast Company, Mashable, Business 2 Community CityLab, and The New York Times, including a 2013 report on global business competence and a 2016 article about artificial intelligence in the workplace.

She has written ten business and career books, offering guidance on getting a desirable job, changing careers, managing a multi-generational workforce, and work habits to achieve success. She has written about the intersection of technology and the workplace, and consults with companies about preparing for the workplace of the future.

In 2009, Levit served on the Business Roundtable's Springboard Project, which advised the Obama administration on workplace issues. The following year, she helped develop JobSTART 101, a free online course for college students and recent graduates to help them learn the necessary skills for success as entry-level employees.

In 2011, she worked with the Department of Labor under the Obama administration to develop a new career-transitioning program for veterans. Also in 2011, as a member of DeVry University's Career Advisory Board, she co-founded the Career Advisory Board's Job Preparedness Indicator, an annual study of the US job market that was issued for six years. The survey was designed to track the disparity between what hiring managers say they're looking for in candidates and the skills those candidates actually possess.

From 2014 through 2017, she contributed to the Deloitte millennial leadership studies. In 2016, Levit presented a five-minute Ignite-style talk on the future workplace at DisruptHR at 1871 in Chicago. In 2017, she presented a TEDx talk on the future of work in Evanston, Illinois, and spoke at South by Southwest alongside technology entrepreneur Randi Zuckerberg and DeVry University president Rob Paul.

In 2018, Levit published the international best-selling book, Humanity Works: Merging Technologies and People for the Workforce of the Future. The book was printed in multiple languages, and Levit presented corresponding workshops on five continents. In 2019, she started a podcast called Workforce 2030.

During the 2020-2021 coronavirus pandemic, Levit received a federal grant from the National Institute of Mental Health to create an app that uses cognitive behavioral techniques to alleviate the emotional distress caused by unemployment. Partnering with Northwestern University researchers, Levit demonstrated her product via a 2023-2024 clinical trial.

In 2022, Levit returned to the Wall Street Journal to anchor a section and newsletter, The Workplace Report, which advises CEOs and CHROs on modern employment issues and features interviews with leaders including EEOC Commissioner Keith Sonderling and National Labor Relations Board Deputy General Counsel Jennifer Abruzzo.

Levit formed a partnership with artificial intelligence HR technology company Eightfold AI, with which she co-authored her book, Deep Talent, in 2023. She is also a member of the HR think tank The Workforce Institute, the Association for Professional Futurists, the Grey Swan Guild, and the Hacking HR global community.

== Honors ==
- Money magazine's Best Online Career Expert, 2010
- Forbes magazine's Top 100 Websites for Women, 2010, 2012
- Northwestern University Emerging Leader, 2012
- Mashable's 14 Career Experts to Follow on Twitter, 2012
- Forbes magazine's Top 100 Websites For Your Career, 2013
- American Management Association Top Leader, 2015
- Thinkers50 Radar, 2019
- Certification in strategic foresight from the University of Houston, 2021

== Bibliography ==
- They Don't Teach Corporate in College: A Twenty-Something's Guide to the Business World, Franklin Lakes, NJ: Career Press, 2004; revised edition, 2009; third edition, 2014; fourth edition, 2019
- How'd You Score That Gig?: A Guide to the Coolest Jobs [and How to Get Them], New York: Ballantine Books, 2008
- Success for Hire: Simple Strategies to Find and Keep Outstanding Employees, Baltimore: ASTD Press, 2008
- New Job, New You: A Guide to Reinventing Yourself in a Bright New Career, New York: Ballantine Books, 2009
- Blind Spots: The 10 Business Myths You Can't Afford to Believe on Your New Path to Success, New York: Berkley Books, 2011
- Mom B.A.: Essential Business Advice From One Generation to the Next, New York: Motivational Press, 2017
- Humanity Works: Merging Technologies and People for the Workforce of the Future, London: Kogan Page, 2018
- Deep Talent: How to Transform Your Organization and Empower Your Employees Through AI, London: Kogan Page, 2023
