= Alexandra von der Weth =

German operatic soprano

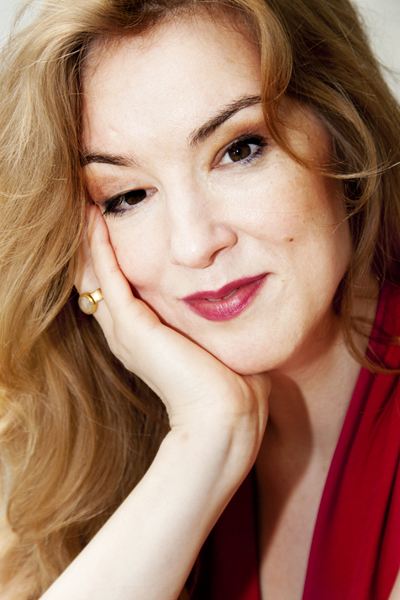
Alexandra von der Weth (2011)

Alexandra von der Weth (born 1968) is a German operatic soprano and voice teacher.

== Life ==
Born in Coburg, Weth completed her schooling at the Gymnasium Albertinum (music high school) in Coburg; she also received singing lessons there. Afterwards she studied singing from 1987 to 1991 at the Richard-Strauss-Konservatorium München and graduated in 1992.

=== Career ===
At the beginning of the 90s she successfully participated in several singing competitions (among others Kulturkreis der deutschen Wirtschaft im BDI).

At the Opernhaus Leipzig she made her debut in 1993 as Beauty in André Grétry's Beauty and the beast At the Deutsche Oper Berlin in 1994/1995, on a scholarship, she sang the role of Blanche in Poulenc's Dialogues des Carmélites and Gretel in Humperdinck's Hansel und Gretel. In 1996, she joined the Deutsche Oper am Rhein as an ensemble member. In 1999, she appeared at the Vienna State Opera as Musetta in Puccini's La Bohème, and also sang at the Metropolitan Opera in 2001. That same year, she received the Förderpreis des Landes Nordrhein-Westfalen für junge Künstlerinnen und Künstler. Other roles at the Deutsche Oper am Rhein included the title roles in Alban Berg's Lulu and Bellini's Norma. She has also made appearances at Glyndebourne Festival Opera, Lyric Opera of Chicago and Royal Opera House Covent Garden London.

In 2003, at the height of her career, Weth's voice suddenly failed. After a long period of treatment, she was able to cure her vocal cords. Her first appearance after logopaedic treatment was in 2005 as Erifile in Alessandro Scarlatti's opera Telemaco at the Deutsche Oper am Rhein. In the following seasons, she sang there the part of Pamina from Mozart's The Magic Flute as well as the Contessa from Le nozze di Figaro. In 2008, folgte Cleopatra in Händel's Giulio Cesare at the German Opera on the Rhine. She sang the same role at the Theater Dortmund in 2010.

Weth has been intensively involved with voice training not only since her healing phase. In October 2010, she founded the "Institute for Voice Training at the Centre for Outpatient Medicine" in Wuppertal. In 2012, Weth told of her voice crisis and how she overcame it in a conversation with Christoph Schulte im Walde.

Since 2016, she has been active as a concert organiser and moderator. Her talk-concert series "Music and Psyche" began on 29 September 2016 in Düsseldorf.
