= Alexandra Nikiforova =

Russian actress

- Born: Alexandra Olegovna Nikiforova; 16 February 1993 (age 33); Sevastopol, Crimea,
- Education: St. Petersburg University
- Occupation: Actress
- Years active: 2016–present
- Awards: Seoul International Drama Awards

Aleksandra Nikiforova (born Alexandra Olegovna Nikiforova 16 February 1993) is a Russian actress, best known for her role in a Turkish TV series Kalbimin Sultanı as a Russian "spy on the Sultan's Harem", and (Detective Anna) (Russian: Анна-детективъ) and Commander's Bride.

== Personal life ==
Alexandra Nikiforova was born on February 16, 1993, in Ukraine, in Sevastopol, Crimea. She was a student of St. Petersburg University. She started her career as an actress in 2016. According to Alexandra, it was that period that determined her future fate.

=== Education ===
While studying in the 11th grade, she received an invitation from the St. Petersburg State University to participate in the contest "Mind + beauty = student", which guaranteed the winner admission to the university without test and tuition fee. But a year later she transferred to the Faculty of Linguistics. However, later she admitted to the Russian State Institute of Performing Arts. But she did not graduate from this university, because in the third year, she gave birth to a daughter and took a sabbatical.

=== Marriage ===
Alexandra married Evgeny Semenov, who was the director of the film "Detective Anna", which brought her an international attention and moved to Moscow. In 2015, she gave birth to their daughter Anna, but they separated from each other shortly after. Evgeny accused Alexandra of allegedly starring in pornographic films, which she herself told him.

== Career ==
=== Early work (2008–2015) ===
Nikiforova committed to acting professionally at the age of 23, but initially found it easier to pass auditions. From childhood, she was familiar with the acting profession. Her own aunt was a member of the "Black Sea Fleet Theater troupe" and became a role model for her. Alexandra was often invited to performances, escorted backstage and shown all the secrets of acting. Her first appearance in cinema was the children's adventure film "Трое с площади Карронад" (English: The Three at the Square of Carronades)", in which Alexandra played the role of schoolgirl Lyuda Sviridova. In 2008-2010, at the age of 15, Alexandra worked in the Sevastopol Youth Theatre, played many significant roles including military roles, in "On an Island, Among the Raging Elements" and "War Has No Female Face". She was invited to perform as a regular actress of the Psycho Del Art Theater (Sevastopol), and worked in "Messalina - the Emperor's Wife" (Messalina) and "Donka" (Michelle) from 2009 to 2010.

=== Breakthrough (2016) ===
Nikiforova's first breakthrough came when she played leading role Anna in "Detective Anna", after she moved to Moscow, transferring to the Shchepkin Theater School. Before that, she jus had experience working in theater, and mini-series such as "The Three at the Square of Carronades". Although she played as supporting character in the films "Russian Character", "Wound Leave", "City Spies", "Leningrad 46" and others. Alexandra worked together with Andrei Ilyin and Svetlana Nemolyaeva. In 2018, a drama "Idol" released, where she played a Soviet model. In the same year, the popular detective series "Ragged Melody" was released, in which she played with the Serbian Mir Marić.

== International work (2019) ==
Although widely praised for her acting and performances, Alexandra had rarely found films or series' that appealed to a wide audience, but another breakthrough came when she was invited to play the leading role of Anna Petrovna in 2019's Turkish-Russian historical TV series Kalbimin Sultanı, made her an international superstar.

=== Plot ===
The series tells about Istanbul of the 19th century. The love story of the daughter of an official from the Russian Embassy "Anna Petrovna" and the great Ottoman Sultan "Mehmud Han" makes thousands of viewers cling to TV screens. In this, Nikiforova was a Russian teacher of language. One day, the powerful Sultan Mahmud II took to the streets in the guise of a boatman. Suddenly some Jenisseri started rampant in the locality. Seeing this, the Sultan fought with them in the guise of a boatman. When the Sultan came to the river bank, Anna met him. Anna asked him to ride the boat to cross the river. Sultan found Anna a language teacher. Next day he invited her to the imperial Harem to teach the heirs of the ruling dynasty French and Russian language. Anna became fool seeing the Sultan, and tried to refuse. But the envoy of the Russian Empire, Dmitry Shcherbina threatened Anna with the death of her father, he forces her to settle in the sultan's palace as a spy. But both of them fall in love.

She had to learn Turkish for this widely liked series. The second season of the project is expected in the spring of 2022.

== TV show ==
In 2018, the actress got a minor role in the series "Secrets of Mrs. Kirsanova". Later, Nikiforova became the host in the TV show "Signs of Fate". The program told about ambiguous and mysterious events that affected the lives of ordinary people and celebrities.

== Filmography ==
=== Television ===
| Year | Title | English | Role | Notes |
|---|---|---|---|---|
| 2008 | Трое с площади Карронад | The Three at the Square of Corronades | Lyuda Sviridova | Supporting role |
| 2009 | Одна семья | One family | | |
| 2013 | Городские шпионы | City Spies | | |
| 2014-2015 | Ленинград 46 | Leningrad 46 | Zhenya Pecherskaya | Supporting role |
| 2014 | Русский характер | Russian character | Lena | Supporting role |
| 2014 | Отпуск по ранению | Wound leave | Vika, daughter of Sveta | Supporting role |
| 2015 | Высокие ставки | High stakes | Oksana | Supporting role |
| 2016 | Анна-детективъ | Detective-Anna | Anna Viktorovna Mironova | Leading role |
| 2017 | Кумир | Idol | Regina | Leading role |
| 2017 | Другая кровь | Other blood | Zlata, daughter of Erofey | Leading role |
| 2017 | Доктор Рихтер | Doctor Richter | Dasha | Leading role |
| 2018 | Оборванная мелодия | Ragged Melody | Elena | Leading role |
| 2018 | Убийства по пятницам | Murders on Friday | Elena (Ellen) | |
| 2018 | Годунов | Godunov | Sofia | Supporting role |
| 2018 | Тайны госпожи Кирсановой | Secrets of Mrs. Kirsanova | Victoria Blackwood | Leading role |
| 2018 | Kalbimin Sultanı | Sultan of my heart | Anna | Leading role |
| 2019 | Кассирши | Cashiers | Maria | Leading role |
| 2019 | Прыжок Богомола | Mantis Jump | Raya | |
| 2019 | Забывая обо всём | Forgetting About Everything | Ludmila | Leading role |
| 2019 | Кумир | Idol | Regina, fashion model | |
| 2019 | Тайна последней главы | The Mystery of the Last Chapter | Lana Bersenyeva | |
| 2019 | Убийства по пятницам-2 | Murders on Fridays-2 | Elena | Leading role |
| 2020 | Невеста комдива | Commander's Bride | Katya Petrova | Leading role |
| 2020 | Давай найдём друг друга | Let's find each other | Anya | Leading role |
| 2020 | Одно тёплое слово | One warm word | Tamara | |
| 2020 | Анна-детективъ второй сезон | Detective-Anna (second season) | Anna Viktorovna Mironova | Leading role |
| 2021 | Другая кровь | Other blood | Zlata, daughter of Erofey | Leading role |
| 2021 | Чистые руки | Clean hands | Marina | |
| 2021 | Стюардесса | Stewardess | Maria Selivanova | |
| 2022 | Закон бумеранга | The Law of the Boomerang | Katia | Leading role |
| 2022 | Тихие воды | Still waters | Kira | |
| 2022 | Доктор Краснов | Doctor Krasnov | Dasha | |

=== Theatrical works ===
Her theatrical works as below:

| Year | Title | Role | Theater |
|---|---|---|---|
| 2008 | On an island, among the raging elements | Tonya | Sevastopol Youth Theatre |
| 2008 | War has no female face | Underground girl | Sevastopol Youth Theatre |
| 2009-2010 | Messalina - the Emperor's Wife | Messalina | Psycho Del Art |
| 2009-2010 | Donka | Michelle | Psycho Del Art |
| 2013 | Dandelion Wine | Alice (dir. A.Y. Shapiro) | Bryantsev Youth Theatre (St. Petersburg) |
| 2020 | Lady for a Day | Louise O.Danilov | Theater of the Russian Army |

== Prizes and awards ==
2017 Seoul International Drama Awards in the field of television production nominated her as the Best Dramatic Actress, Performer of the main role for the drama series "Detective Anna".
