= Alexandra Lethbridge =

Photographer

Alexandra Lethbridge (born 1987) is a Hong Kong-born conceptual artist working with photography and installation, living in the UK. She self-published The Meteorite Hunter in 2014, work from which was exhibited at The Photographers' Gallery in London. The Path of an Honest Man was exhibited at Format Festival in Derby and work from Other Ways of Knowing exhibited at The Lumiere Brothers Center for Photography in Moscow.

== Early life and education ==
Lethbridge was born in Hong Kong. She studied at Winchester School of Art at the University of Southampton in the UK, and at the International Center of Photography in New York City. She earned a Masters in Photography from the University of Brighton in the UK.

== Work ==
"By leaving out information, changing the scale of an image or altering colours, Lethbridge's photos make the viewer pause to wonder what exactly is going on."

The Meteorite Hunter "is an investigation into meteorites and the illusory realms they represent." "Meteorite hunters search for treasures from space, pushing aside the terrestrial in a quest for the alien. Alexandra Lethbridge sees their work as a metaphor for how people are too often chasing the exotic at the expense of the familiar. [. . . ] The photo book documents the work of a fictional meteorite prospector and the stunning otherworldly locales her objects come from. [. . . ] But here's the twist. The pictures depict the wonders of earth and space, but you don't know what's what."

Other Ways of Knowing "explores the notions of surprise and beguilement, creating a fantastical history that raises fascinating questions around how our perceptions can be guided, manipulated and fooled." "Lethbridge makes us think about the reliability of photography itself."

The Path of an Honest Man "looks at the misaligment between communication and understanding". The Archive of Gesture "utilises found images, still life photography and digital interventions to explore the role of gesture in communication".

== Publications ==
=== Books of work by Lethbridge ===
- The Meteorite Hunter. Self-published, 2014.
  - Second edition. Self-published, 2014. ISBN 978-0993139413.
  - Third edition. Self-published, 2015. Edition of 150 copies. ISBN 978-0-9931394-2-0.

=== Books with contributions by Lethbridge ===
- Photography: the Key Concepts. Second, revised edition. Abingdon-on-Thames, Oxfordshire: Routledge. By David Bate. Hardback, 2016. ISBN 9780857854926. Paperback, 2016. ISBN 9781350107953.
- 1000 Words: 10 Years: 2008 – 2018. 1000 Words, 2018. ISSN 2631-486X.
- Unique: Making Photographs in the Age of Ubiquity. House of Oktober, 2018. By Katherine Oktober Matthews. ISBN 978-94-93075-01-6.
- 209 Women. Liverpool: Bluecoat, 2019. ISBN 9781908457523.

== Exhibitions ==
=== Solo exhibitions ===
- The Path of an Honest Man, Format Festival, Derby, 2018
- The Construction of Truth, Winchester School of Art, University of Southampton, Southampton, 2020

=== Group exhibitions ===
- Mythopoesis, University of Brighton, Brighton, September 2014. University of Brighton MA Photography exhibition, included work from The Meteorite Hunter.
- Fresh Faced + Wild Eyed, The Photographers' Gallery, London, May–June 2015. Included work from The Meteorite Hunter.
- ING Unseen Talent Award: the Curator's Choice, The Lumiere Brothers Center for Photography, Moscow. Work by the winner and 5 shortlisted photographers of the ING Unseen Talent Award, included Lethbridge's Other Ways of Knowing.
- 209 Women, Portcullis House, Parliament of the United Kingdom, London, 2018/2019; Open Eye Gallery, Liverpool

== Awards ==
- 2015: A winner, Flash Forward: Emerging photographers, Magenta Foundation, Toronto, Canada
- 2017: 1 of 5 shortlisted, ING Unseen Talent Award, from ING Group and Unseen Amsterdam. "Each of the finalists created an artwork for the ING Collection".
- 2017: A winner, Flash Forward: Emerging photographers, Magenta Foundation, Toronto, Canada
- 2021: Winner, Spotlight Award, Belfast Photo Festival, Belfast, UK, for The Archive of Gesture. A £2000 prize.
