= Alexandra Bradshaw =

Canadian-American painter

- Alexandra Bradshaw 1923
- Born: April 20, 1888; Nova Scotia, Canada
- Died: September 23, 1981 (aged 93); Whittier, California
- Known for: Painting
- Spouse: Clarence Hoag

Alexandra Bradshaw, also known as Alexandra Bradshaw Hoag (April 20, 1888 – September 23, 1981), was a Canadian-American watercolor artist and art professor. She studied art in the United States and Paris and became an instructor and head of the Fine Arts department at Fresno State College in California. Her works were exhibited in group and solo exhibitions throughout California and the United States from the 1930s through the 1960s. She married late in life to Clarence Hoag, the founder of Hoag Press in Boston. Their residence in Wakefield, Massachusetts, was Castle Clare and Bradshaw kept her house in South Laguna, California.

== Biography ==
Alexandra Christine Bradshaw was born in Nova Scotia. Bradshaw was a senior class member in the General Professional Course at the California State Normal School in 1907 and 1908. A member of the midwinter class, she received her degree in January 1908. In 1914, she took an advanced art course at the California State Normal School in Los Angeles. She studied with Andre Lhote at Stanford University, with Rex Slinkard at University of California, Los Angeles, and Andre Lhote again at Columbia University and Paris. She also studied with Hans Hofmann.

Bradshaw taught at the California Normal School in Fresno by 1917. She was made Director of the Fine Arts Department at Fresno State College in 1920, a position she held until 1948. Two of her students that were particularly influenced by her were Don David and Hubert Buel.

The Laguna Beach South Coast News reported on August 30, 1940, that Bradshaw donated a watercolor entitled Fishing at Three Arch Bay to the British Red Cross Relief at a luncheon event held at her home the previous Sunday. The painting was purchased by Mrs. C. Charles Clark of Laguna Beach.

From the time when Bradshaw was Fresno State College Fine Arts department head, she had a summer house at Three Arch Bay in South Laguna, California. Bradshaw married Clarence Hoag by 1954. Hoag was born in Nova Scotia in 1880 and founded Hoag Press in Boston, Massachusetts. Clarence and Alexandra lived outside of Boston, Massachusetts, in Wakefield in Castle Clare, that Clarence built between 1922 and 1949. It was divided into apartments after Clarence's death. The castle burned in 1974. Bradshaw also kept a summer house at Three Arch Bay in South Laguna, California. In 1966, the Hoags were on the California Register Blue Book.

On September 23, 1981, Bradshaw died in Whittier, California. Her works are featured at the California Regionalist Art Collectors Club in Newport Beach.

== Memberships ==
Bradshaw was a member of the Boston Society of Watercolor Painters, Cambridge Art Association, Laguna Beach Art Association, Pacific Art Association, San Francisco Women Artists, Fresno Art Association, and California Watercolor Society.

== Selected exhibitions ==
Her were work was exhibited at:

- San Francisco Society of Women Painters, 1932 (award)
- Golden Gate International Exposition, 1939
- National Association of Women Artists, 1940, 1941
- California Water Color Society 1940, 1942, 1944, 1952–53
- Laguna Beach Art Association, 1941–48, (prizes), 1944, 1948 (prize)
- San Francisco Art Association, 1943, 1944
- San Francisco Museum of Art, 1943
- Riverside Museum, NY, 1944, 1946
- Pasadena Art Institute (solo), 1959-1965
- Lucius Beebe Memorial Library, Wakefield MA, 1960, 1964
- Laguna Beach CA, 1964
- Crocker Art Gallery (solo)
- Museum of Fine Arts, Boston
- Busch–Reisinger Museum
- San Diego Gallery Fine Arts (solo)
- City of Paris, San Francisco
- Little Gallery, Boston
