= Alexandra Gallagher =

British artist

Alexandra Gallagher (born 1980) is a British multidisciplinary artist. She creates paintings, collages, print, and digital and street art.

== Early and personal life ==
Gallagher was born in Lancashire, England. Her father, an art teacher, taught her how to paint. Gallagher started painting portraits, however, she eventually felt limited and restrained. She became interested in surrealism.

Gallagher dropped out of her foundation course at 17 years old. She became a mother at 19. She returned to Blackburn College at 21 years old for a year, juggling responsibilities as a mother and as a student. Gallagher says she struggles with routines.

== Art ==
Gallagher creates mixed media art — often combining painting, photography and digital art. Her works explore the realms of imagination, dreams, memory and experience and subtly contemplates upon notions of feminism, sexuality and identity. Gallagher uses women as subjects and imbues her works with geometric lines and shapes, symbolism from history and different cultures, and objects from the natural world such as flowers, plants and birds.

Gallagher's art is colorful and organic. It is described to be delicate, ethereal and refined. She fuses Art Nouveau’s ornamentalism and surrealism's dreamlike quality in evoking the subconscious.

== Selected works ==
- Drawing in Winter
- The Heart and Tongue of Virtue
- Melancholy Paradise
- Swallow Blind
- Our Lady of Sorrows
- Sin of Man
- The Seventh State of Perfection
- Evolution of Camouflage
- The Monkey and the Hare
- Shepards Delight
- Birds with Birds
- Carry My Soul to Heaven
- Forbidden Fruit
