= Alexandra Killewald =

American Sociology Professor

Alexandra (Sasha) Achen Killewald (born February 15, 1983, in Walnut Creek, California) is an American educator, demographer, and professor of sociology at the University of Michigan since 2023.

== Biography ==
Killewald holds a BS in economics, mathematics, and French, MA in sociology, MA in statistics, and PhD in sociology from the University of Michigan. After earning her doctorate in 2011, Killewald worked as a researcher for Mathematica Policy Research before becoming an assistant professor at Harvard University in 2012. In 2016 she became full professor (with tenure) at Harvard University. Killewald joined the University of Michigan in July 2023 as Director, Stone Center for Inequality Dynamics Robert F. Schoeni Research Professor, Institute for Social Research, and Professor, Department of Sociology in the College of Literature, Science, and the Arts.

== Work ==
Killewald's major works have been in the sociology of the family, particularly the division of labor between men and women. In 2024, she was elected to join the American Academy of Arts and Sciences for her significant contributions to sociology.

In a paper co-authored with Margaret Gough that was named the "Article of the Year" by the Sociology of the Family section of the American Sociological Association in 2014, Killewald found that women experience wage gains when they marry, challenging the theories of specialization in marriage proposed by economists such as Gary Becker. According to Killewald and Gough, women's contribution to their families through unpaid labor is not only determined by tradeoffs with their husbands, but is also shaped by their own commitments to wage earning and household labor.

In a 2016 American Sociological Review article, Killewald demonstrated that if men are not employed full-time, this greatly increases their probability of divorce, but low earnings, per se, do not effect the probability of divorce. Killewald interpreted this to show that the failure to fulfill the social expectation of being a breadwinner threatens men's likelihood to stay in a marriage, not financial strain.

Killewald is the co-author of the 2012 book Is American Science in Decline? with Yu Xie. This book assesses the state of American science, using systematic data from a large range of sources on science education and occupations in the U.S. over the past 70 years.

Killewald also conducts research the influence of parental wealth on adult outcomes, including the role of parental wealth in explaining the racial wage gap in the United States. She has also written (with Kerwin Charles and Erik Hurst) on assortative mating by parental wealth.

== Selected bibliography ==
- Killewald, Alexandra and Javier García-Manglano. 2016. "Tethered Lives: A Couple-Based Perspective on the Consequences of Parenthood for Time Use, Occupation, and Wages." Social Science Research 60:266–282
- Killewald, Alexandra. 2016. "Money, Work, and Marital Stability: Assessing Change in the Gendered Determinants of Divorce." American Sociological Review 81(4):696–719
- Wood, Robert G., Quinn Moore, Andrew Clarkwest, and 'Alexandra Killewald. 2014. "The Long-Term effects of Building Strong Families: A Program for Unmarried Parents." Journal of Marriage and Family 76(2):446-63.
- Killewald, Alexandra and Jonathan Bearak. 2014. "Is the Motherhood Penalty Larger for Low-Wage Women? A Comment on Quantile Regression." American Sociological Review 79(2):350-7.
- Killewald, Alexandra and Margaret Gough. 2013. "Does Specialization Explain Marriage Penalties and Premiums?" American Sociological Review 78(3):477–502.
- Killewald, Alexandra. 2013. "A Reconsideration of the Fatherhood Premium: Marriage, Coresidence, Biology, and Fathers' Wages." American Sociological Review 78(1):96–116.
- Killewald, Alexandra. 2013. "Return to Being Black, Living in the Red: A Race Gap in Wealth That Goes Beyond Social Origins." Demography 50(4):1177–95.
- Killewald, Alexandra and Yu Xie. 2012. Is American Science in Decline? with Yu Xie, Harvard University Press ISBN 978-0674052420
