= Aleksandra Antonova =

Aleksandra Antonova or Alexandra Antonova (Russian: Александра Антонова) may refer to the following notable people:

- Aleksandra Antonova (hurdler) (born 1980), Russian hurdle runner
- Aleksandra Antonova (water polo) (born 1991), Russian water polo player
- Aleksandra Antonova (writer) (1932–2014), Kildin Sami and Russian teacher, writer, poet and translator
