= Alexandra DiNovi =

American actress

Alexandra Di Novi (born November 7, 1989) is an American actress. She won Best Actress in the New York International Independent Film and Video Festival for The Perfect Girl and Purity.

== Early life ==
DiNovi was born in 1989 and raised in Hinsdale, Illinois. She is of Italian descent.

== Career ==
=== Acting ===
==== Television ====
She appeared as "Luci, the Cigarette Girl" on one episode of I Didn't Know I Was Pregnant in 2009.

==== Films ====
DiNovi has appeared as a featured dancer in The Break-Up. She has appeared in over thirty full-length independent films, having her directorial, production and writing debut in Purity: A Dark Film (2010).

==== Awards ====
DiNovi won Best Actress in the New York Independent Film & Video Festival 2010. She also won Best Film Noir at the Beverly Hills New Media Festival in 2011.

=== Modeling ===
Alexandra is a model for "G-Star Raw".
