= Alexandra Gardner =

American composer

- Born: 1967 (age 58–59); Washington, DC., United States
- Education: Peabody Institute, Vassar College
- Known for: Composing, electronic music
- Style: Contemporary, experimental, electronic
- Awards: American Composers Forum, New Music USA, National Endowment for the Arts, DC Commission on the Arts and Humanities
- Website: Alexandra Gardner

Alexandra Gardner (born 1967) is an American contemporary composer based in Baltimore, Maryland. Her music employs diverse acoustic instrumentation and electronics, drawing on minimalist and modernist influences as well as extra-musical sources and sounds. Critics note her work for its blend of contemplative and expressive qualities, clear structure and unexpected evolution, and complex rhythms. In a 2007 New Yorker essay, music critic Alex Ross placed Gardner among a "vital group of composers" creating a "new kind of interstitial music" that blurs genre boundaries.

Gardner's work has been performed in solo, chamber and orchestral contexts and as scoring for dance, theater and visual art performances, at venues including Kennedy Center, Aspen Music Festival, Centro de Cultura Contemporania de Barcelona, Strathmore Music Center and Symphony Space, among others. It has been commissioned by ensembles and artists including Seattle Symphony, pianist Jenny Lin, cellist Joshua Roman, Liz Lerman Dance Exchange, and SOLI Chamber Ensemble. Gardner's music is recorded on the Innova, Ars Harmonica, and Naxos labels.

== Early life and career ==
Alexandra Gardner was born in 1967 and raised in Washington, DC. She studied percussion (focusing on marimba), composition and electronic music with Charles Barbour, Annea Lockwood and Richard Edward Wilson at Vassar College. After taking a year off to intern at Harvestworks Digital Media Arts Center, she graduated with an A.B. degree in music in 1990 and began creating electronic music in collaborations with modern dance choreographers and groups in the DC area, including Sharon Mansur, Deborah Riley and Liz Lerman Dance Exchange.

In 1993, she enrolled at CalArts, where she studied with Morton Subotnick and explored Afro-Cuban and Ghanaian percussion in performance outside of school. After the 1994 Northridge Earthquake, she returned to the east coast, enrolling at the Peabody Institute of Johns Hopkins University (M.M. Composition, 1997) in Baltimore and studying with Ronald Caltabiano and Jean Eichelberger Ivey.

Since then, in addition to composing, Gardner has taught at the Levine School of Music, worked as an audio engineer for NPR, served as an associate editor for NewMusicBox, and provided coaching for music creators.

== Composing ==
Gardner's compositions often combine acoustic instrumentation and electronic music created from organic sound sources and field recordings; reviews frequently note a seamless blending of these elements in her work, described by The New Yorker as an "alchemy of craft, whimsy and sensual appeal." Her influences include minimalist and contemporary classical figures, such as Pauline Oliveros, Steve Reich and George Crumb, her training as a percussionist, and extra-musical sources including the natural sciences (particularly geology), literature and mythology. Gardner employs an intuitive process, experimenting with a wide range of unfolding ideas and textures that are ultimately organized through disciplined formal constructions. Writers characterize her music as featuring thoughtful, compositional frameworks, accessible and lyrical melodies, a balance of subtle textures and dramatic gestures, and a lively sense of rhythm.

=== Electronic compositions and music for dance ===
In her early career, Gardner composed electronic music for modern dance group performances that was often described as "haunting" and "sensitive." Many of these works are compiled on her CD, Marblehead: Electronic Music 1990-2000. The composition "Marblehead" (1992)—commissioned for a dance whose props included a chair and a large bowl of marbles—was created entirely from sampled sounds of marbles clicking and rolling; in a review of the work's later performance, Cleveland's The Plain Dealer described it as "amusing taped study in rhythm and percussive sonorities." Gardner composed three other works on the CD, among others, for choreographer Sharon Mansur: "Waterborne," "Shifting Sands" and "Framework".

She wrote "Light Chimney" (1995, for flute, trumpet, horn and percussion) for a Smithsonian Institution-commissioned dance performance in the National Building Museum, creating a hushed response to the site's cavernous size, structure and textures. In 1999, as composer-in-residence at Liz Lerman Dance Exchange, she composed "In Praise of Young People and What They Have To Say" for the group's millennium multimedia project, a collaboration with underserved youth. In 2001, Gardner composed the electroacoustic work "Oasis" for a Deborah Riley Dance Projects performance commissioned by Kennedy Center. Her later work, "Bloom" (2009, cello and electronics), was used as a score by Ballet San Antonio in 2015.

=== Solo and duo works ===
In the 2000s, Gardner often focused on solo and duo compositions, some written for visiting soloists while she was composer-in-residence at the Institut Universitari de l’audiovisual/Phonos Foundation in Barcelona from 2002 to 2004. Combining acoustic instruments, electronic sound synthesis and sampled ambient sound, several of these works are contained on Gardner's CD, Luminoso (2006). Reviews describe its music as exhibiting clear compositional structures and accessible rhythms, expressivity in both solo lines and electroacoustic textures, and a fluid dynamic between those two modes, ranging from often indistinguishable samplings, expansions and variations on the soloist sounds to open, confrontational dialogues. Time Out's Steve Smith wrote "the electronic elements seem to move with the same volition and flexibility as her human collaborators"; Tim Rutherford-Johnson noted those elements for their tactility and "hands-on-the-controls live performance feel."

Among the CD's compositions, "Ayehli" and "Snapdragon" (2002) both interweave field recordings; "Snapdragon" blends trombone soloing and samples with sounds from Barcelona, while "Ayehli" interlaces repeated marimba figures with street sounds recorded in December 2001 at the 9/11 site. Smith wrote that the piece's marimba rises above the "steely ambience" of Ground Zero "like a hardy stem pushing through a crack in the sidewalk." Other compositions include "Luminoso" (2003), whose flamenco strumming and processed sounds critic Alex Ross described as evoking "a lone guitarist wandering around a sun-baked ruin"; "Tourmaline" (2004), described in performance reviews as a taut, engaging mix of soprano saxophone, bustling counterpoints and ghostly echoes; "New Skin" (2004), a meditative, slightly improvisatory work contrasting alto flute and processed percussion sounds; and "Ónice" (2003), written for bass clarinetist Harry Sparnaay.

Some of Gardner's later solo/duo compositions include: "electric blue pantsuit" (2007, amplified violin and computer sounds); "Bloom" (2009), commissioned by cellist Joshua Roman; the sonata variation "Chalcedony Sonata", written for pianist Jenny Lin; and the flute and soundtrack piece, "Fade" (2019), commissioned by the National Flute Association.

=== Chamber music ===
Gardner's first widely recognized chamber music compositions were written in the late 1990s after her graduate studies. "Migrations" (1997) was composed for the Aspen Contemporary Ensemble while Gardner attended the Aspen Music Festival and School on scholarship. Inspired by ideas involving both migrating birds and molecules, it employs small step-wise, expansive instrumental movements and a single dramatic shift. Washington Post and San Francisco Classical Voice reviews of the piece's performance describe the work as balanced in its "bracing effects and textures" and both highly lyrical and "provocative of thought," respectively. "Crows" (1998), a five-vignette work commissioned by the San Antonio-based SOLI Chamber Ensemble, was inspired by texts about earth and nature by Native American poet Joy Harjo. San Antonio Express-News critic Mike Greenberg described it as thoughtful, compact and "harmonically … fresh and surprising, but always accessible," comparing its ordered unfolding of ideas through drones and sustained chords to the work of Pauline Oliveros and its textural "flutters and chirps" to Olivier Messiaen's work.

After composing the chamber works "Coyote" and "Coyote Turns" (both 2004, for percussion and string quartet, respectively), Gardner created "The Way of Ideas" (2007) for the Seattle Chamber Players to perform at the Icebreaker contemporary music festival, organized by Alex Ross in 2008. Inspired by a line in Philip Pullman's The Golden Compass about how thoughts become reality, the work has been described as both well-structured and open to random ideas, with a succession of linked, cheerful instrumental motifs with an undercurrent of melancholy. In 2016, Gardner was commissioned by the Grand Valley State University New Music Ensemble to write a work inspired by Yellowstone for a tour commemorating the 100th anniversary of the National Park system. Based on her interest in geological events, she created "Vixen," a composition named for and structured around the unique eruption pattern of one of the park's geysers.

=== Orchestral and large ensemble works ===
In the 2010s, Gardner has been commissioned to write several orchestral and large ensemble works, including two percussion-oriented works for the Seattle Symphony (SSO).

She wrote "Just Say Yes" (2012) for Alan White, drummer of the band Yes, as part of the SSO's "Sonic Evolution" project. In 2018, as composer-in-residence, she premiered "Significant Others" at the symphony. Reviewers noted the piece's sensitive melodies, open harmonies, restless progression and lively rhythms, connecting it to the works of American composers Charles Ives and Aaron Copland. Gardner's SSO residency also involved workshops with LGBTQ+ and homeless youth in Seattle. The result was her score, "Stay Elevated," which was based on workshop improvisations, snippets and rhythms created or suggested by the participants and performed by symphony musicians in the lobby of the Seattle Art Museum.

Gardner's other orchestral/ large ensemble works include "Ciphers and Constellations" (2016, commissioned by the String Orchestra of Brooklyn); "Perseids" (2014, for wind ensemble); "Banyan" (2008, premiered by the Chicago Composers Orchestra in 2012); and "Tamarack" (2000, accordion and ensemble; commissioned by the CrossSound Music Festival).

== Recognition and awards ==
Gardner has been recognized with grants from the American Composers Forum, Meet the Composer, Maryland State Arts Council, National Endowment for the Arts, Netherland-America Foundation and New Music USA, and fellowships from the DC Commission on the Arts and Humanities and Vassar College (W.K. Rose Fellowship), among others. She has had composer residencies at Seattle Symphony, Willapa Bay AiR, MacDowell Colony, and Institut Universitari de l’Audiovisual, among others. She has also been commissioned to compose new work for institutions including Kennedy Center, American Harp Society, National Flute Association, and Town Hall Seattle, among others.

== Discography ==
- Dawn Chorus: Music Inspired by Our National Parks, Grand Valley State New Music Ensemble, Innova Recordings, (2020) – "Vixen,"
- As I Am, Kate Amrine, Self-produced (2018) – "Ituri,"
- Musica, por un tiempo, Soli Chamber Ensemble, Naxos (2014) – "Crows"
- Obres per a flauta i electronica, Julian Elvira, Ars Harmonica (2009) – "New Skin"
- Violectrica, Jennifer Choi, Self-produced (2009) – "electric blue pantsuit"
- Obres per a Trombó I Electronica, Carlos Gil Ferrer, Ars Harmonica (2007) – "Snapdragon"
- Luminoso, Alexandra Gardner, Innova Recordings (2006) – "Luminoso," "Tourmaline," "Snapdragon," "Ónice," "Ayehli," "New Skin"
- Marblehead: Electronic Music 1990-2000, Alexandra Gardner, Self-produced (2000) – "Marblehead", "Excavation," "Waterborne," "Picking Up," "Shifting Sands," "Framework," "Sleeping Weather"
