= Alexandra Rutlidge =

British water polo player

Personal information
- Born: 12 November 1988 (age 36); Lancaster, Great Britain

Sport
- Sport: Water polo

Alexandra "Alex" Dorothy Rutlidge (born 12 November 1988) is a British water polo player. She competed for Great Britain in the women's tournament at the 2012 Summer Olympics. This was the first ever Olympic GB women's water polo team.
