= Alexandra Hernandez =

French singer-songwriter (born 1981)

- Born: 1981 (age 44–45); Saint Pierre and Miquelon (France)
- Occupations: Singer-songwriter; poet
- Instrument: Guitar
- Years active: 2004–present
- Website: alexandra-hernandez.com
- Education: University of Montreal

Alexandra Hernandez (born 1981) is a French singer-songwriter from Saint Pierre and Miquelon, an overseas collectivity of France located near the Canadian province of Newfoundland and Labrador.

== Biography ==
Alexandra Hernandez was born in Saint Pierre and Miquelon in 1981, the daughter of an Algerian father and Miquelonnais mother. Her mother is of Acadian background, dating back to the colonists' arrival on the archipelago.

At age 18, Hernandez left the territory to study music at the University of Montreal, where she studied saxophone for five years. In 2004, after college, she moved to France. There, she learned guitar and began writing songs, taking first prize in several European competitions.

Her music is multicultural, balancing between her French and North American roots. She sees herself as neither French, Acadian, or North American, but all three. She "seeks to strengthen the ties between the French archipelago and its Canadian neighbors, the Atlantic Provinces".

After settling for a period in the Landes and dividing her time between France, Quebec, and Saint Pierre and Miquelon, Hernandez returned permanently to her home territory in 2015. In 2017, she founded the Festival Les Transboréales, an annual music festival in Saint Pierre and Miquelon. It aims to bring together French and Canadian artists in unusual locations on the remote archipelago.

Hernandez's work has been featured by the French Consulate-General in Moncton, Canada, as part of the Acadie Rock Festival, a celebration of Acadian culture. She also represented her home country at a joint concert celebrating Overseas France at the Olympia in Paris in 2019.

In additional to her musical efforts, Hernandez is also a poet. Her poems appeared in the book Saint-Pierre et Miquelon: Terre de Passions, in collaboration with the photographer Gregory Pol, in 2016.

== Discography ==
- Ma Tranqu'île (2009)
- Lula-Rose (2012)
