= Alexandra Rozenman =

Russian-American artist (born 1971)

- Александра Михайловна Розенман
- Born: March 11, 1971 (age 55); Moscow, Russia
- Education: SUNY Empire State College, New York, New York, School of Museum of Fine Arts - Tufts University, Boston, Massachusetts
- Occupations: Contemporary American Artist & Art Educator
- Relatives: Bella Rosenfeld Chagall
- Website: www.alexandrarozenman.com

Alexandra Rozenman is a contemporary Russian-American painter, graphic designer, and book illustrator. She draws upon various styles such as folk art, Russian Underground Conceptualism, and Jewish art. She is recognized for her works where visual artifacts are used as the means for telling intricate, idiosyncratic, compelling stories. Her work has been on exhibit in the leading museums, including the National Centre for Contemporary Arts in her native Moscow, and deCordova Museum in Lincoln, Massachusetts. Rozenman lives in Boston and works in Somerville, Massachusetts.

== Early life and education ==
Rozenman was born in Moscow, Russia (then Soviet Union). Her early influences included an art school for gifted child artists at the Pushkin Museum - at that time the only venue for Western art shows in Moscow, both ancient and modern. Nina N. Kofman, an art educator, ran an art school for very young children at the museum, actively using its collection as a study aide. Several of Rozenman's works from that period have been shown at the international shows of children's art (in Russia, Japan, India, and Finland, among others). Later on, Rozenman studied with several dissident artists who went on to become famous in the West, including Grisha Bruskin. When Rozenman's family emigrated from Russia to the US in 1989, she continued her art education there, participating in the Studio Semester in New York Program at SUNY Empire State College (she graduated in 1995), and proceeding to Boston, where she earned her MFA from the School of Museum of Fine Arts at Tufts University in 1997.

== Career ==
Rozenman worked in several locations in the United States, including Washington, New York City, Boston, Los Angeles, East Lansing, Michigan, and Saint Paul, Minnesota, focusing on her life experience and expressing American reality. Her work reflects European, Russian, and Jewish influences; Marc Chagall, whose first wife Bella Chagall is Rozenman's great-aunt, is an influence. Rozenman was a member of the Fountain Street Gallery from 2018 until its closure in 2024.

== Paintings ==
Over three decades, starting as a child artist, Rozenman went through several periods, capturing life experiences in images. They reflect, on the one hand, her highly personal accounts of love, loss, and search for beauty, and on the other hand—the environments of Russia, California, New York City, Boston, Midwest, and Europe.

In one of her recent series of paintings, called Transplanted, Rozenman superimposes her own images with iconic works of European and American artists, including Leonardo da Vinci, Breugel, Turner, Monet, Matisse and Diebenkorn. This series, a part of which has been on display in Boston in 2013, represents the artist's search for a personal place in the story of the world art.

== Graphics ==
Rozenman started working on small graphics format in her teens, selling art from the sidewalks of Moscow busy Arbat Street thoroughfare. She returned to this form recently, partly for the purposes of book illustration.

== Book illustration ==
Rozenman illustrated several books, including "Two Hands Clapping" a collaborative book of drawings with the British poet Grace Andreacchi (Andromache Books, London, 2009). Grace Andreacchi also published the video Two Hands Clapping on YouTube.

She has recently finished illustrating "Sticky Leaves" by Mikhail Epstein, a Russian-American literary theorist and critical thinker.

== Art school ==
Since 2012, Rozenman has been running a popular art school with classes for children and adults in Allston, and later in Somerville, Massachusetts, offering classes, seminars, and workshops in experimental and classical painting and drawing.

== Principal solo exhibitions ==
- 2023 - Collages, Gallery 360, Minneapolis, MN
- 2018 - Blind Dates, Hudson Gallery, Gloucester, MA
- 2016 - Broken Memories, J’s Bodzin Gallery, Fairfax, VA
- 2015 - In Motion, Hammond Art Gallery, Fitchburg College, Fitchburg, MA
- 2013 - Transplanted, Multicultural Art Center, Cambridge, MA
- 2014 - Tales On Paper, Newbury College, Brookline, MA
- 2010 - La’ Magique, French Cultural Center, Boston, MA
- 2010 - Life Or Theater? Gallery 360, Minneapolis, MN
- 2009 - Art Of Storytelling, The Ann Loeb Bronfman Gallery Washington, DC
- 2008 - Enter and Exit, Gallery 360, Minneapolis, MN,
- 2006 - Hold Still, Goetemann Art Gallery, Gloucester, MA
- 2003 - Changes, Argyle Zebra Gallery, Saint Paul, MN
- 2000 - New Work, Clark Gallery, Lincoln, MA
- 1999 - After The Intermission, University of Tennessee, Knoxville, TN
- 1998 - Playful Paintings, New England School of Art and Design, Boston, MA
