= Alexandra Duel-Hallen =

Professor of electrical and computer engineering

Alexandra Duel-Hallen is a professor of electrical and computer engineering at North Carolina State University known for her research in wireless networks.

== Education ==
Duel-Hallen is a 1982 graduate of Case Western Reserve University, with a double major in mathematics and computer science. She earned a master's degree from the University of Michigan in 1983, and completed her Ph.D. at Cornell University in 1987. Her dissertation, Detection Algorithms for Intersymbol Interference Channels, was supervised by Chris Heegard.

== Recognition ==
Duel-Hallen has been listed as an ISI Highly Cited researcher. She was elected as an IEEE Fellow in 2011, "for contributions to equalization and wireless communications".
