= Alexandra Cordes =

German writer (1935–1986)

Alexandra Cordes (real name Ursula Horbach, née Schaake, 16 November 1935 – 27 October 1986) was a prolific German writer of mainly romantic fiction, many of whose books were best-sellers. Cordes was married to the fellow novelist Michael Horbach, who encouraged her to write. However her novels outsold his own. She was estimated to have 15 million books sold, while Horback had sales of about 4 million books.

In October 1986, Horbach shot his wife in the head with a revolver from his weapon collection. He then shot himself in an apparent murder-suicide attempt. He died after a week in intensive care.

== Life ==
Ursula Schaake was born in Bonn, Germany, of Huguenot descent. After finishing school she worked in the Bonn office of the Times newspaper. Afterwards she worked as a journalist for a number of German newspapers, including the "Welt" and the "Hamburger Abendblatt".

In 1958, she married Michael Horbach, a journalist and novelist, who encouraged her to write. She started by writing serials in women's magazines, which were later published in book form. The books sold well, so that by the time of her 59th book she had a turnover of 15 million books sold. This eclipsed the turnover of her husband, who had over four million books sold, over a much longer period.

In the 1970s, the childless couple moved to Châteauneuf-du-Pape in the Provence. On the night of 27 October 1986, Michael Horbach shot his wife in the head, killing her, with a revolver from his weapon collection. He shot himself a few hours later and died after a week in intensive care.

== Select works ==
- Die entzauberten Kinder, Bayreuth 1963
- Drei Sterne sah ich leuchten, Munich 1983
- Einmal noch nach Hause, Munich 1983
- Liebe unter fremden Dächern, Munich 1983
- Die Nacht der Versuchung, Munich 1983
- Psychiater Dr. R. Treffpunkt Hansa-Hotel, Munich 1983
- Rechtsanwalt Dr. M., Munich 1983
- Spuren in der Wüste, Munich 1983
- Das Zauberkind, Munich 1983
- Hunde aus Porzellan, Munich 1984
- Das Jahr danach, München 1984
- Der Sehnsucht seltsame Wege, Munich 1984
- Traum von der ewigen Jugend, Munich 1984
- Das Traumschloß, Munich 1984
- Am Ende aller Flucht, Munich 1985
- Das dritte Leben, Munich 1985
- Lorna und das große Abenteuer, Munich 1985
- Der Mann aus der Fremde, Munich 1985
- Der Buschpilot, Munich 1986
- Der Hoteldetektiv, Munich 1986
- Die Lady, Munich 1986
- Eiko, Munich 1987

== Sources ==
Erich Schaake: Lieben und Sterben in der Provence. Die Geschichte der Alexandra Cordes. Langen/Müller, 2005, ISBN 978-3-7844-3018-8.
