= Alexandra Dementieva =

Alexandra Dementieva (Russian: Александра Дементьева; born 1960 in Moscow, USSR) is an artist who has created works of electronic, video, interactive and installation art since 1992.

== Biography ==
Dementieva spent much of her childhood with her grandfather Eugene Volkov, a biochemist, who instilled in her a love of science. She graduated from Moscow State University of Printing Arts in 1985. Her artistic career began in 1984 when she originally practiced painting and drawing. In 1990 she moved to Belgium and began experimenting with Amiga 2000, Macintosh, PC computers and videocamera Hi8. She was interested in anthropology and psychology, particularly in behaviorism, which led her to create an interactive environment. She graduated from Academy of Fine arts Watermael-Boitsfort in Brussels. In 1999 she became one of the co-founders of IMAL (Interactive Media Art Laboratory) in Brussels.

== Career ==
Dementieva's work is influenced by contemporary film directors like David Lynch, Jean-Luc Godard and David Cronenberg, to name but a few. Her use of the cut-up technique invites comparison with the cinematic montage as a method for altering reality that has been recorded. However, Dementieva's editing depends largely upon audience participation, the chance and choices that she expects her viewers to make. This interactivity is an essential element in all her work. She has made spectator involvement an integral part of the creative process. She explores contemporary trends in the construction of a narrative, and questions the very process of storytelling by stepping aside and offering every viewer the power to reshape and manipulate the original imagery or plot. The sliced layers offer interesting juxtapositions and can derive new meaning or create a new contextual relationship in the viewer's mind. Her methods are akin to contemporary VJ manipulations, musical remixing and recycling. Her visualisations echo Dadaist experimentations with texts or Russian absurdist's poetry. The space she creates for each installation “stimulates unconditional mental freedom” Faina Balakhovskaya; it is fluid, responsive and transformative.

Her interactive installations, exhibited in Brussels, Moscow and New York City, were described by artist Barbara Rosenthal as "Technically proficient, visually striking, fundamentally simple despite the mechanical and computational pyrotechnics she and her associates put themselves through to produce them, her works draw spectators into them, and in ways that circle back into their own minds."

Her work has been exhibited in France, Brazil, United States, Spain, Mexico, Germany, Switzerland, Korea, Italy, etc.

=== Solo exhibitions ===
- 'The white is not what it seems', Nadine, Brussels (Belgium), 2019
- '10 Installations', MMOMA, Moscow (Russia), 2017
- 'Parallel Dimensions', Marion De Cannière gallery, Antwerp (Belgium), 2013
- 'Universal Recording', EI (Experimental Intermedia), Ghent (Belgium), 2012
- XL gallery, Moscow (Russia), 2009
- CCNOA, Brussels (Belgium), 2009
- 'Non Unexpected Encounters' RSUH Museum Center, Moscow (Russia), 2008
- 'Psyche and the Digital', Neutral Ground gallery, Regina (Canada), 2007
