= Alexandra Techet =

American mechanical and marine engineer

Alexandra Hughes Techet is an American mechanical and marine engineer whose work involves experimental and image-based studies of hydrodynamics. She is a professor of mechanical and ocean engineering at the Massachusetts Institute of Technology department of mechanical engineering.

== Education and career ==
Techet grew up as a sailor and diver in coastal North Carolina.

She studied mechanical and aerospace engineering at Princeton University, graduating in 1995. She then studied oceanographic engineering through a joint graduate program between the Massachusetts Institute of Technology and Woods Hole Oceanographic Institution, earning a master's degree in 1998 and completing her Ph.D. in 2001.

Her research aims to address the long standing hydrodynamic problems that are being faced by the ocean science and engineering community and by the United States Navy.

After postdoctoral research at Princeton, she returned to MIT as Doherty Assistant Professor of Ocean Utilization in the department of ocean engineering. In 2005 she became an assistant professor of mechanical engineering, as part of a broader merger of MIT's ocean engineering and mechanical engineering departments. She was promoted to full professor in 2019.

Techet is a director of the EHL which is known as Experimental hydrodynamics Laboratory at MIT.

== Contributions ==
Techet's research contributions include a study of the ability of archerfish to jump out of water in search of prey, and high-speed video capture of sneezes.

During the COVID-19 lockdown, she has also been active in providing home gardening advice to the MIT community through the MIT Office of Sustainability.

== Recognition ==
Techet was named a fellow of the American Society of Mechanical Engineers in 2018.

Alexandra was a recipient of the 2004 ONR Young Investigator Award.

She was featured on a cover of Journal of Fluid Mechanics
