= Alexandra Morrison =

Canadian photographer

Alexandra Morrison is a Canadian photographer, who has three times been selected as the Manitoba Photographer of the Year, (2011, 2012, 2015) as well as being selected as the Canadian photographic Artist of the Year in 2009 (the only photographer from Manitoba to win a national Photographer of the Year award, as of March 2013).

Morrison's image entitled Rain Forest Tapestry was selected among the Top 10 Landscape images in the world, at the inaugural World Photographic Cup. Her most recent exhibit included two images in the juried photography show "Captured Images" at the Peachland Art Gallery in Peachland, British Columbia during February 2020.

Her image Crying Wolf was selected to hang in the prestigious Ping Yao Photographic Exhibit in China in 2015.
