= Alexandria Boehm =

American scientist specializing in coastal water quality

- Education: B.S. California Institute of Technology (1996), M.S., PhD University of California, Irvine (1997, 2000)
- Employer: Stanford University

Alexandria Boehm is an American scientist whose field of study is civil and environmental engineering. She studies sources, fate and transport of pathogens outside the human body, and coastal water quality. Boehm is a senior fellow at Stanford University's Woods Institute for the Environment, faculty fellow at Stanford University's Center for Innovation in Global Health, and an associate professor in Stanford University's Department of Civil and Environmental Engineering.

== Early life and education ==
Boehm grew up in Oahu, HI. Growing up, she swam, surfed, and snorkeled at the beaches which helped build her admiration for the ocean.

Boehm graduated with honors from California Institute of Technology with a Bachelor's of Science in Engineering and Applied Science in 1996. She earned her Masters of Science from University of California, Irvine in Environmental Engineering in 1997. She went on to earn her PhD from University of California, Irvine in 2000.

== Career and research ==
Boehm is currently a full professor in the Department of Civil and Environmental Engineering at Stanford University. She is also a senior fellow at Stanford University's Woods Institute for the Environment and a faculty fellow at Stanford University's Center for Innovation in Global Health. In 2008, she was a general participant in the National Academy of Engineers' Frontiers of Engineering Symposium. The U.S. Frontiers of Engineering Symposium brings together a group of leaders in engineering to interact and share the technology and advances in their different fields. She was selected as a co-chair panelist for the West Coast Panel for Ocean Acidification and Hypoxia for the states of California, Washington, and the Province of British Columbia and served from 2013 to 2016. This panel gives policy recommendations on ways to lessen the impacts of global climate change in these specific states.

She is interested in pathogens in the environment including their sources, fate, and transport in natural and engineered systems. She studies how pathogens are transmitted to humans through contact with water, feces, and contaminated surfaces. Her research is focused on key problems in both developed and developing countries with the overarching goal of designing and testing novel interventions and technologies for reducing the burden of disease.

She is also interested broadly in coastal water quality where her work addresses the sources, transformation, transport, and ecology of biocolloids - specifically fecal indicator organisms, DNA, pathogens, and phytoplankton - as well as sources and fate of nitrogen. This knowledge is crucial to formulating new management policies and engineering practices that protect human and ecosystem health at the coastal margins.

Boehm is honored in her field for using her research to benefit the health of the ecosystem and the human populations that use these coastal ecosystems Her interdisciplinary research focuses on both human impacts and natural actions. Boehm benefits the health of coastal populations and ecosystems by helping direct policy changes to prevent and restore the water in coastal zones.

== Awards and honors ==
- 2007, visiting scholar for Pacific Rim Center for Oceans and Human Health
- 2007, CAREER Research award under the environmental engineering and sustainability programs from the National Science Foundation.
- 2016, ASCE Walter L. Huber Civil Engineering prize.
- 2019, senior fellow at the Woods Institute for the Environment at Stanford University.
