= Alexandra Kutas =

Ukrainian female model (born 1993)

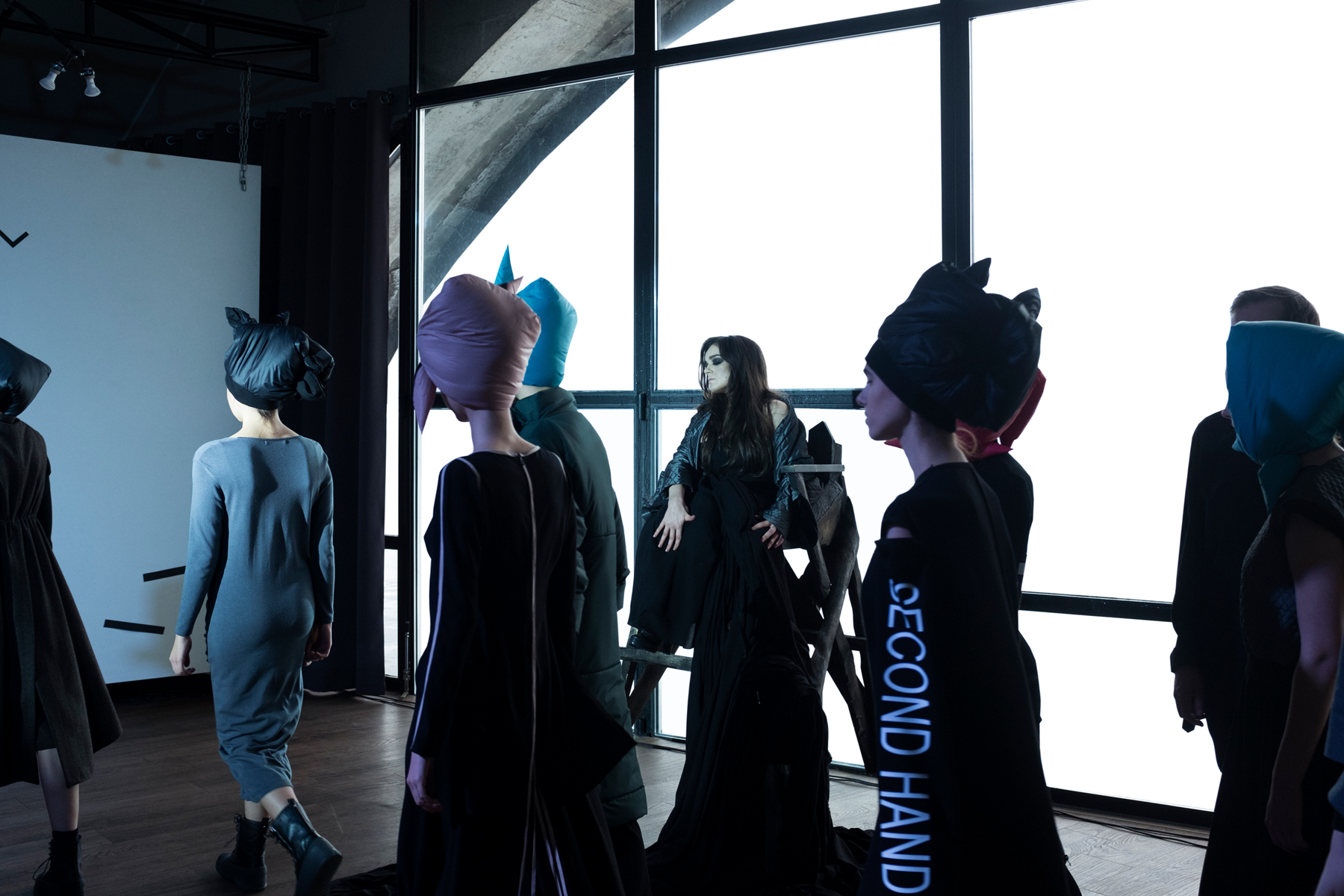
- in 2017
- Born: Alexandra Kutas; November 5, 1993 (age 32); Dnipro, Ukraine
- Occupation: Model
- Years active: 2015–present
- Modeling information
- Hair color: Brown
- Eye color: Brown

Alexandra Kutas (Ukrainian: Олександра Кутас, born November 5, 1993) is the world's first runway model in a wheelchair, first fashion model with a disability in Ukraine, an entrepreneur, a public speaker, and was an adviser to the mayor of Dnipro on the accessibility of urban infrastructure.

== Early life ==
Alexandra Kutas was born in Dnipro. Due to a medical error at birth, she experienced a spinal cord injury and has used a wheelchair from an early age. While still in secondary school, Kutas was a journalist and she entered a television and press studio. She interviewed various creative people, conducted programs, and covered festivals. When the studio won a UNICEF contest in 2009, Kutas was chosen as one of the best young journalists, and invited to New York for an award. Then Kutas became interested in psychology. After graduation, Kutas entered the psychological faculty of Dnipropetrovsk National University, where she studied for four years, despite the near-total lack of disability access adaptations. As Kutas graduated from the university with honors, fighting began in the east of the country, and the wounded started to arrive in Dnipro. Kutas was a volunteer in a military hospital for three months. In 2011, Kutas first became interested in the fashion world. She was inspired by the work of British designer Alexander McQueen who used a model with a disability in 1999.

== Career ==
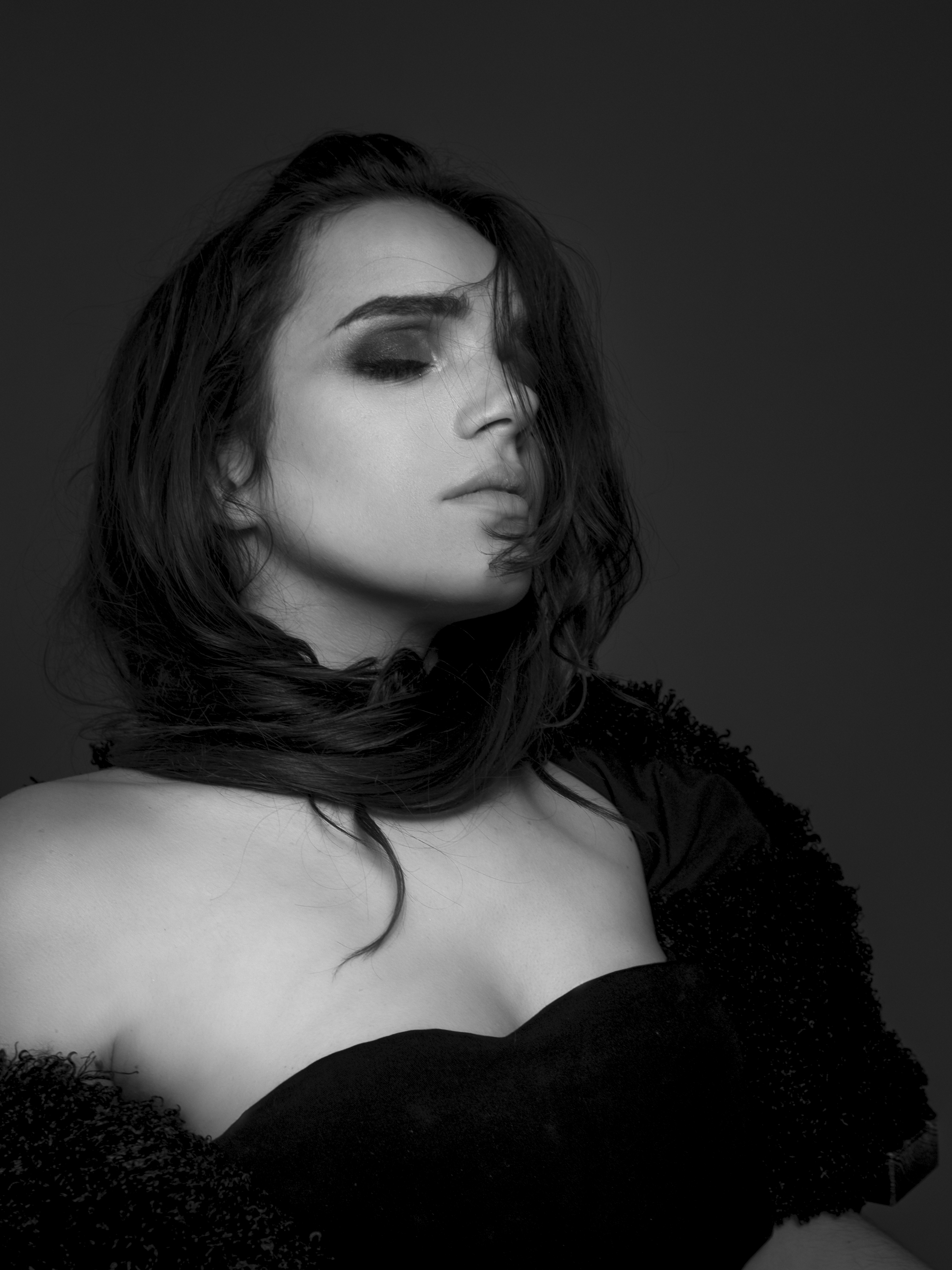
Shooting fashion video

=== "Break Your Chains" Exhibition ===
In the summer of 2015, Kutas first took part in Ukrainian Fashion Week, where she met many fashion figures. On July 16, together with photographer Andrei Sarymsakov, she presented in Kyiv a photo exhibition entitled "Break Your Chains", which was also presented in the framework of Ukrainian Fashion Week. This fashion project, designed to break down public stereotypes about people with disabilities, gathered many positive responses from Ukrainian and international media. The American edition of The Huffington Post wrote:

Ultimately, Her courage and perseverance certainly inspire a lot of people with disabilities not to stop on their way to their dreams. By and large, she is not just a person who has overcome unimaginable obstacles.

—The Huffington Post

=== "VIY" Runway Show ===
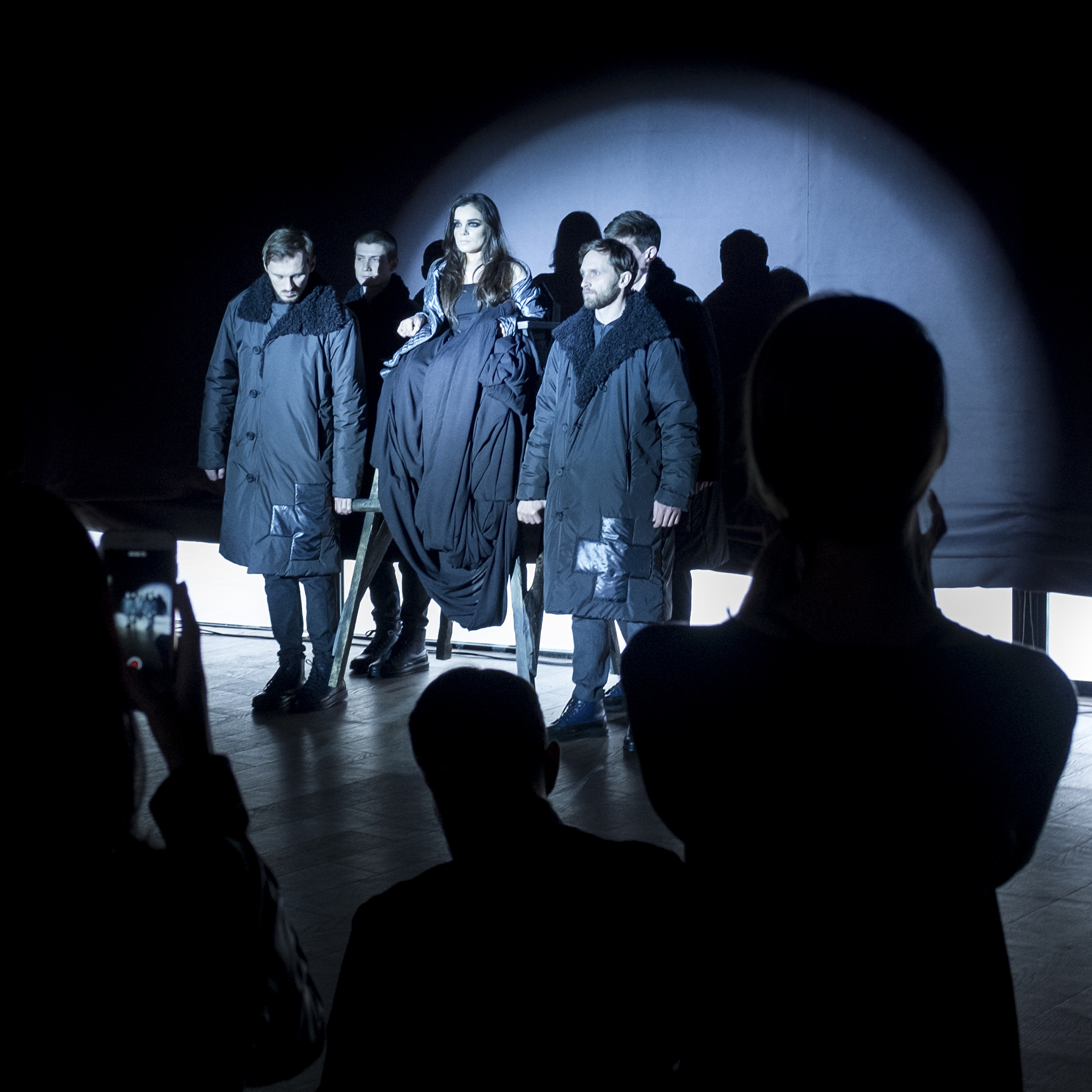
Fedor Vozianov's show

In March 2016, Kutas began to cooperate with her American manager Blake Wind. Wind and Kutas used social media to build a network of thousands of contacts in the fashion industry. Italian fashion executive Maurizio Aschero connected Kutas to Ukrainian fashion designer Fedor Vozianov in the Fall of 2016. Vozianov gave her a central role in the show of his new collection. During two months of preparation for the show, Kutas gave more than 100 interviews. On December 30, she gave an interview to the news portal Newsy about the problems of the modern fashion industry, spotlighted by George Takei.

At the end of January 2017, Kutas and the team were working worked on the world's first fashion video featuring a model with a disability. On February 3, 2017, the presentation of the autumn/winter 2017 show "Viy" was held. Kutas performed the main role in the show, where male models carried her on the catwalk on a throne made for the show. The event achieved was reported in 50 countries, by such sources as Vogue, and the Spanish newspaper El Mundo. The show also featured the fashion-video by Alexandra, entitled "Viy Prelude".

=== Runway of Dreams ===
In June 2017 Kutas came independently to NYC for a month long trip centered on participating in a gala fashion show for Runway of Dreams, in association with Tommy Hilfiger.

During her time in NYC, she had two well-received photoshoots. One is on commission for Vogue Ukraine Online. It was the first editorial for Vogue Ukraine Online featuring a model in a wheelchair.

=== Strawberrifox contract ===
In August 2017, Kutas signed her first contract with a modelling agency. Till November 2017 she has been working with Strawberrifox, a modelling agency in Delhi. It is the first time a model with a disability from abroad has worked on the Indian fashion market.

=== Top 30 Under 30 Award ===
On December 5, 2017, Kutas was presented with the Kyiv Post Ukraine's Top 30 Under 30 award and was the first model so honored.

=== 21st Fervent Global Love of Lives Award ===
On September 20, 2018, in Taipei, Kutas became one of 17 winners selected from 2,616 candidates from all over the world.

The president in Taiwan, Tsai Ing-wen, said although all recipients are equally inspiring, she was particularly moved by Alexandra Kutas from Ukraine.

Wheelchair-bound [sic] since birth, Kutas long dreamed of becoming a model, the president said. Hundreds of auditions and rejections later, she finally became her country's first physically challenged model and, in the process, overturned the status quo and allowed the world to see true beauty.

— Tsai Ing-wen

=== Puffins Fashion ===
In 2019, Kutas was invited to the British Fashion Awards for the work she's done. This includes co-founding the adaptive clothing company Puffins Fashion. Her philosophy for the brand, and adaptive clothing at large, is simple: respect the needs of others.

== Personal life ==
In 2019, Kutas got married. In September 2020, she gave birth to her first child Sofia.
