= Alexandra Ocles =

Ecuadorian politician

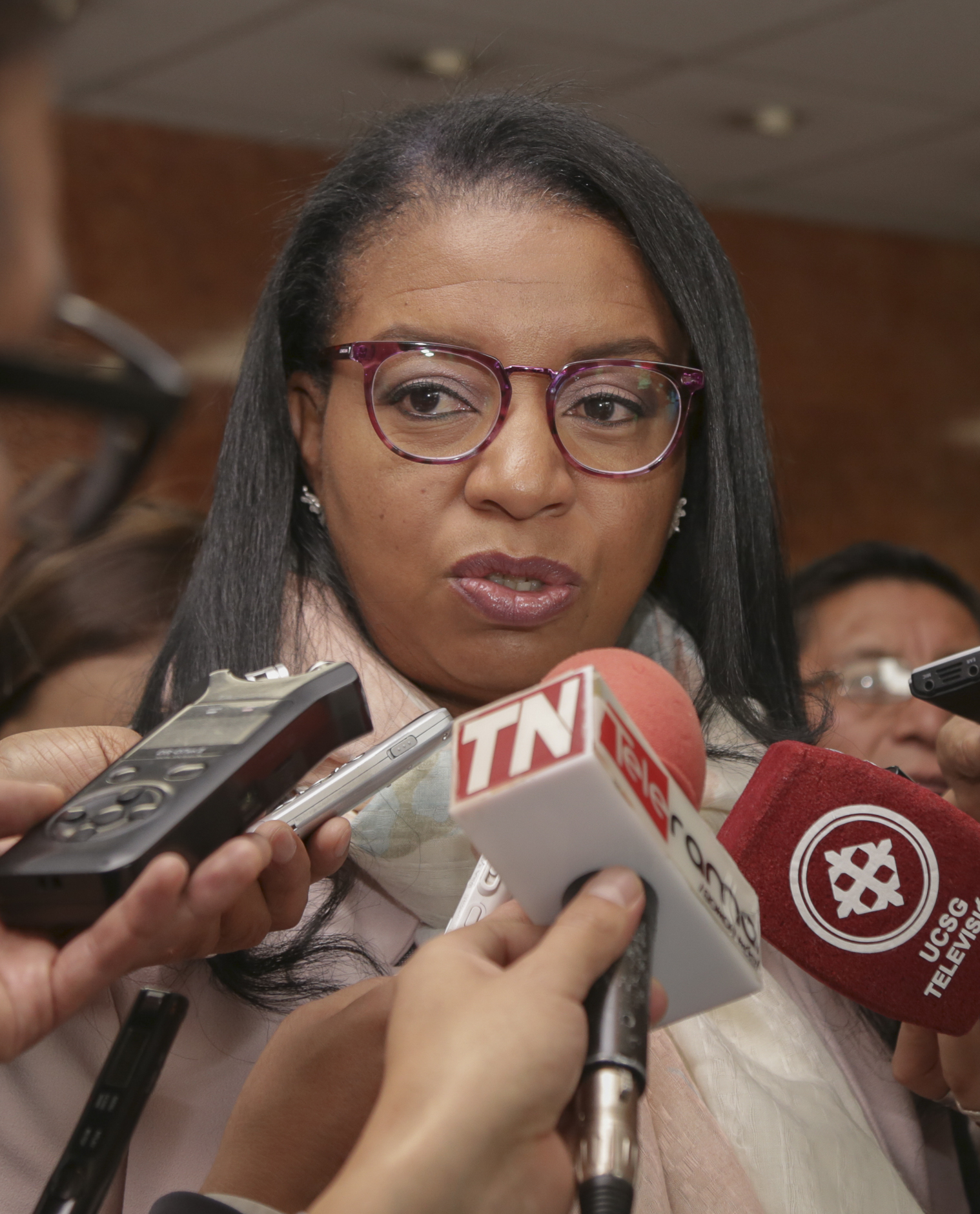
- Alexandra Ocles in 2018

National Secretary of Risk Management
- In office May 24, 2017 – May 1, 2020

National Assembly of Ecuador
- In office 2013–2017

Ecuadorian Constituent Assembly
- In office 2007–2008

National Congress of Ecuador
- In office 2003–2007

Personal details
- Born: January 22, 1979 (age 47) Quito
- Party: PAIS Alliance
- Education: Politecnica Salesiana University
- Occupation: Politician, educator

María Alexandra Ocles Padilla (born 22 January 1979 in Quito) is an Ecuadorian politician and educator.

== Biography ==
Alexandra Ocles was born in Quito on 22 January 1979. From 1989 to 1990, she studied at the Manuela Cañizares College and then obtained a degree in educational sciences at Politecnica Salesiana University and the Latin American Social Sciences Institute.

Ocles was elected to the National Congress of Ecuador for the Socialist Party in 2003, then to the Constituent Assembly in 2007 for the Ruptura 25 movement. She was made head of the People's Secretariat by Rafael Correa and held this position until January 2011. At that time, Ruptura 25 announced its departure from the government, stating that the President had exceeded the expectations of his office. In opposition to the 2011 referendum, Ocles and other members of Ruptura 25 resigned from their positions.

In May 2017, Ocles was named National Secretary of Risk Management by President Lenín Moreno to work with his team during his four year term,
