= Alexandra Allred =

American novelist

- Born: Alexandra Powe; February 5, 1965 (age 61); Frankfurt, West Germany
- Occupations: Author, Fitness Instructor
- Spouse: Robb Allred (m. 1991; three children)
- Writing career
- Period: 1993–present
- Genres: nonfiction-fitness, fiction-mystery
- Website: www.alexandratheauthor.com

Alexandra Powe Allred (born February 5, 1965) is an American athlete, author, environmental advocate, and fitness instructor. She has written and contributed to more than 20 books, fiction and nonfiction.

== Personal life ==
Allred was born in Frankfurt, West Germany and was raised in the Russian Soviet Federative Socialist Republic with her parents and one sister. Her father was an American diplomat stationed throughout Europe. She graduated from Texas A&M University with a B.A. in History. There, she met her husband Robb Allred and they were married in 1991. Alex has three children.

In 2017, Allred graduated from Tarleton State University with a M.S. in Kinesiology.

== Career ==
=== Athletics ===
Alexandra Allred was the first female to make and form the US Women's Bobsleigh team in 1994 by winning the nationals competition with a push time of 6.386 seconds. She was four months pregnant with her second child at the time and was a subject in studies by Dr. James Clapp for health and fitness in pregnant athletes. These studies were used to write the Olympic Committee's safety guidelines for pregnant athletes in 1998.

Allred was featured in Redbook magazine, FIT magazine, and Oxygen magazine in articles about her expertise on health and exercise during pregnancy. Allred was featured in Real Simple magazine as a coach and mentor for women in sports.

She has also been featured in several books as an expert on fitness and exercise.

- The Athletic Woman's Sourcebook:: How To Stay Healthy And Competitive In Any Sport by Janis Graham (1999)
- The Women's Home-Based Business Book of Answers by Maria T. Bailey (2001)
- Hard Fought Victories: Women Coaches Making a Difference by Sara Gogol (2002)
- Driving Forces: Inside the First U.S. Women's Olympics Bobsled Team by Tammi Wark Marcoullier (2002)
- The Daring Female's Guide to Ecstatic Living: 30 Dares for a More Gutsy and Fulfilling Life by Natasha Kogan (2006)
- The Martial Arts Woman: Motivational Stories of Human Triumph by Andrea F. Harkins (2016)

=== Advocacy ===
The Allred family moved from Ohio to Midlothian, Texas (cement capital of Texas) in 2001. Alexandra's youngest child, then two-year-old Tommy, had a sequence of cases of pneumonia, bronchitis, and other asthma related complications. In 2008, the elementary school was named by the USA Today as being in the upper 1% of most toxic schools in the nation. In 2006, Alex, as a part of Downwinders at Risk, went to talk to Congress about clean air regulations. There she and her son Tommy met with future-President, then-Senator, Barack Obama and Senator Dick Durbin, and was nominated as a White House Champion of Change in Public Health in 2014.

=== Writing ===
Allred wrote White Trash (2016). She wrote Damaged Goods (2012) which won the Independent Publisher's Silver medal. The Allie Lindell Series of mystery novels contains Roadkill (2013), Sweet Breath, and Anniversary Killer.

Her 2013 book, Swingman, was the inspiration for the documentary Swingman by filmmaker Mark Birnbaum.

She's contributed to several books on fitness and dog training. Best Breast Exercises: Simple Steps to Lift & Shape your Breasts (Fit Expert Series) (Volume 2) (2014) and Get Fit For Your Pregnancy: Simple Exercises To Help You Look Great & Feel Energized Through Your Pregnancy (Fit Expert Series Book 4) (2012).

In 2005, she was recruited by Volvo to test drive and then write about driving their prototype 'Extreme Gravity Car' then featured in Volvo Magazine.

Allred was diagnosed with dyslexia while at Texas A&M and has made it a mission to visit schools to speak to children and young adults with dyslexia to break the "I'm dumb" stigma. Allred cites that writing books is what made her overcome the stigma.

== Selected works ==
=== Fiction ===
- Code (2001)
- Atticus Weaver and His Triumphant Leap from Outcast to Hero and Back Again (2002)
- My Gaza (2003)
- Damaged Goods (2012)
- Swingman: What a Difference a Decade Makes (2010)
- Roadkill (2013)
- Sweet Breath (2013)
- She Cries (2014)
- Anniversary Killer (2014)
- White Trash (2016)

=== Non-fiction ===
- Atta Girl! A Celebration of Women in Sports (2000)
- Entering the Mother Zone: Balancing Self, Health & Family (2000)
- Passion rules! Inspiring 'Women in Business (2000)
- Teaching Basic Obedience: Train the Owner, Train the Dog (2001)
- Personal Hygiene (2004)
- Physical Activity (2004)
- Dogs' Most Wanted: The Top 10 Book of Historic Hounds, Professional Pooches, and Canine Oddities (2004)
- Disease Prevention: Healthy Living (2005)
- Nutrition (2005)
- Cats' Most Wanted: The Top 10 Book of Mysterious Mousers, Talented Tabbies, and Feline Oddities (2005)
- Athletic Scholarships for Dummies (2005)
- Operation We-Got-This!: Taking On Senior Age, Dementia & Alzheimer's (2016)
- PAS: Fitness for All (2016)
- When Women Stood: The Untold History of Females Who Changed Sports and the World (2023)
