= Alexandra Cunha =

Portuguese marine biologist

- Born: 1962 (age 63–64); Maputo, Mozambique
- Occupation: Marine biologist
- Known for: Marine grassland conservation
- Children: Two

Alexandra Cunha is a Portuguese marine biologist, environmentalist and researcher, specialising in marine grassland ecology. She is a former president of the Portuguese Liga para a Proteção da Natureza (League for the Protection of Nature).

== Early life and training ==
Alexandra Cunha was born in 1962 in Maputo (formerly Lourenço Marques) in the then Portuguese Mozambique. Returning with her family to Portugal after the fall of the Estado Novo regime, she studied at a high school in Portimão on the Algarve coast, which is where she developed her interest in the sea and nature conservation. She graduated in biology from the University of Aveiro and did an internship at the São Jacinto Dunes Natural Reserve near Aveiro. Her supervisor there was assigned to set up the Ria Formosa Natural Park in the Algarve and asked her to join him. She worked there while obtaining a master's degree in coastal management from the University of Algarve. She then moved to the US to obtain a doctorate from Auburn University in Alabama, where she specialized in ecological modelling.

== Career ==
Cunha has coordinated several marine conservation projects as a researcher at the Centre for Marine Sciences in the Algarve (CCMar) at the University of Algarve. From 2007 until 2011, she was the coordinator of the LIFE Biomares project , dedicated to the preservation and recovery of biodiversity in the Luiz Saldanha Marine Park, which forms part of the Arrábida Natural Park. The project involved an investment of 2.4 million euros - 50% financed by the LIFE - Nature programme of the European Commission, and the remaining 50% by the cement company Secil. Between 2010 and 2012, as part of CCMar, she was part of the scientific team of the FindKelp project, "The forests of the Deep Sea", which took place in Portuguese waters. The aim of the study, funded by the EDP Fund for Biodiversity, was to deepen knowledge about kelp species and associated ecosystems.

Cunha became president of the Regional Directorate of the Liga para a Proteção da Natureza (League for the Protection of Nature - LPN) of the Algarve. In 2009, she became national president of the LPN, which is the oldest environmental protection association in Portugal. As president of LPN, she focused on the conservation of species and habitats characteristic of Portugal and also raised issues such as plastic in the oceans, the sinking of ships to create artificial reefs and tourism development with negative environmental consequences.

In 2012 Cunha moved to the United Kingdom, at a time when resources were very scarce in Portugal and there wasn't enough funding for many projects, which were her source of income. She lives in Peterborough and is an advisor to the Joint Nature Conservation Committee (JNCC), a public body that advises on UK and international nature conservation. The work involves conservation and implementation of marine protected areas and she has also managed a project in the area of atmospheric pollution.

== Honours and awards ==
- In 2012 Cunha was one of the three Portuguese winners of the Terre des Femmes prize, from the Yves Rocher Foundation. The prize is intended to financially support activities developed by women that add value to the environment and promote sustainability. The application submitted by Cunha was based on the project "Adopt a seagrass meadow", which was intended to alert people to the vulnerable state of these marine habitats and contribute to the improvement of their conservation status in Portugal. The project was financed by the Lisbon Oceanarium.
