= Alexandra Bounxouei =

Laotian–Bulgarian singer, actress and model

Alexandra Bounxouei ອເລັກຊານດຣ້າ ບຸນຊ່ວຍ
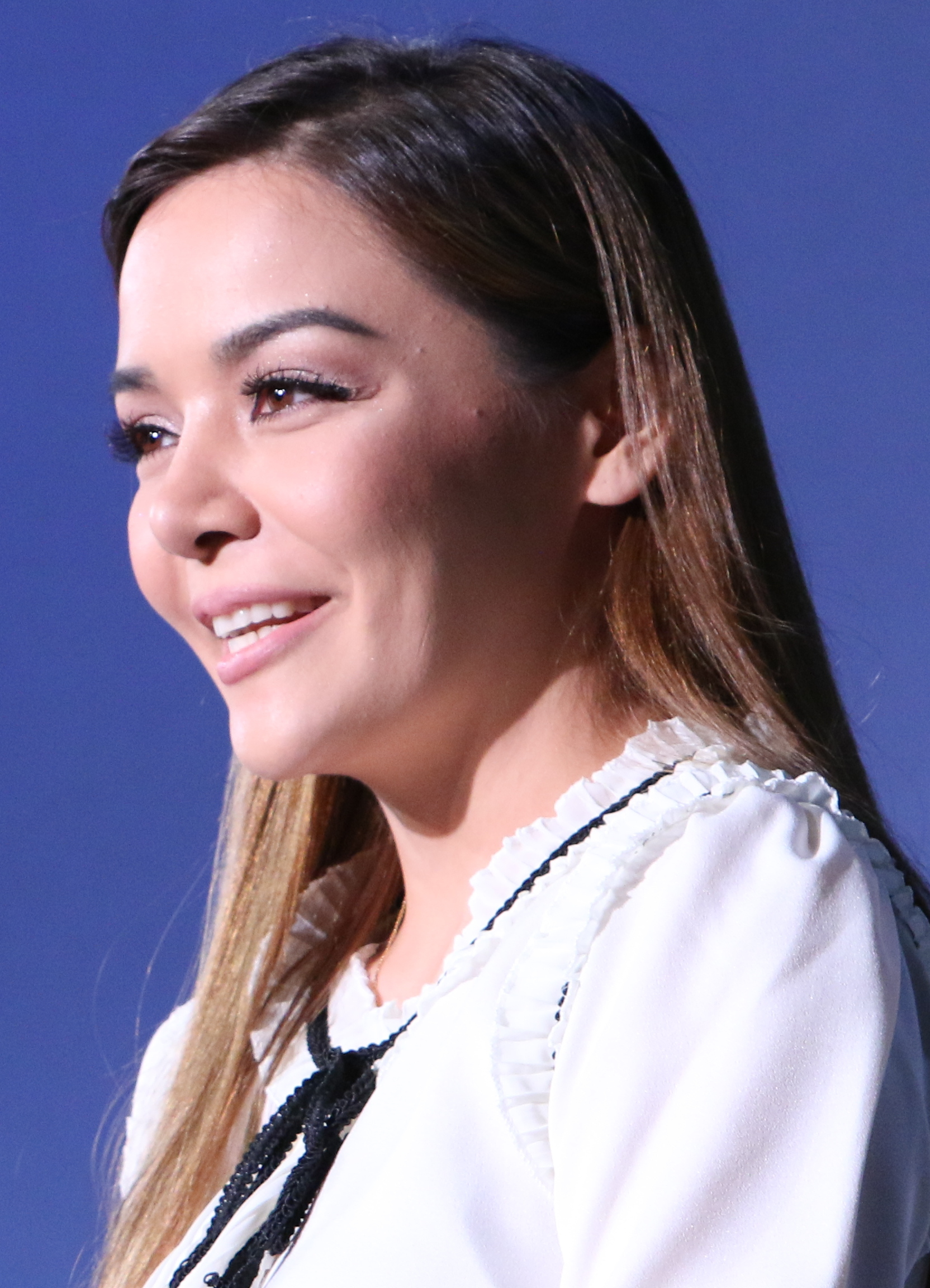

Background information
- Born: 28 May 1987 (age 39); People’s Republic of Bulgaria
- Genres: Pop
- Occupations: Singer, actress, model
- Instrument: Vocal
- Years active: 1990–present
- Label: Workpoint Entertainment

Alexandra Bounxouei (Lao: ອເລັກຊານດຣ້າ ບຸນຊ່ວຍ, Thai: อเล็กซานดร้า บุญช่วย; born 28 May 1987) is a Laotian–Bulgarian singer, actress and model who is popular in Laos, Thailand and the south-east Asia countries. She is the first UNDP's Goodwill Ambassador for Lao PDR since 2013.

== Early life and education ==
Alexandra Bounxouei was born on 28 May 1987 in Bulgaria to a Bulgarian mother and a Lao father, both graduates from the Music academy in Bulgaria. Her father, Bounthavisay Bounxouei, was a music teacher who specialized in music pedagogy and her mother Jordana Bounxouei, who specialized in piano. She comes from a musical family: her grandfather was a famous songwriter in Laos. Her family moved to Laos in 1988, where she was raised. She holds a PhD in Media Design from Keio University.

== Career ==
=== Beginning ===
From the age of 3, she has been singing in children's choirs, and local events with her parents. At the age of nine, she started playing the violin, and used the violin in her music. She continued to participate in events such as official events from governments and organizations.

=== 2003–2014: Solo debut and rising popularity ===
In 2003, she released her first 6 track album Dream. The album topped 200,000 CD and DVD sales. In 2004, she started recording her second album in her home studio. She released her second album Forget It in early 2006, and the album topped 150,000 thousand sales. The same year, she was invited to perform in Japan on the ASEAN-Japan Music Festival along with famous artists from ASEAN countries. She recorded a new track called "Treasure the World". Her popular songs include "Koay Hak Wan Huan Kuean". Her music, which she describes as a combination of traditional Lao and contemporary hip-hop, has earned her glowing reviews in Southeast Asia.

=== 2006–present: Acting debut and mainstream success ===
In 2006, she signed with Workpoint Entertainment in Thailand and landed the leading role in 2 drama, is that aired on Channel 7. She made her acting debut with a leading role in the drama Plengruk Rim Fung Kong (Love Song Along the Mekong River), alongside Sukollawat Kanarot, aired in 2007. She recorded 3 tracks for the drama, 2 duets with the male leading role Sukollawat Kanarot. The title song received a "Golden Award for Best Song of the Year". The same year, she starred in her second drama Rae Rai Louk Sao Pa (Rae Rai the daughter of the forest), aired in 2008. She also recorded two tracks for the drama including the title song and the ending song.

In 2019, she was invited to perform for represented Laos at the ASEAN-Japan Music Festival 2019.

== Ambassador role and humanitarian work ==
Alexandra has been actively engaged in various educational projects, including a campaign to reduce the number of young casualties from traffic accidents, as well as establishing her own foundation to support families with children who have Down syndrome.

On 1 April 2013, Alexandra was appointed as the first National Goodwill Ambassador for Lao PDR by United Nations Development Programme (UNDP). The role of Alexandra was to create awareness against drugs, hygiene, AIDS and be a role model for the Lao people especially the younger generations.

During her first year of appointment, she has brought visibility to the UXO issues by attending various events, including a performance in a fundraising concert "Party Against the Bombies", organised by Handicap International and the Lao Ban Advocates.

== Discography ==
=== Solo album ===
- Dream (2003)
- Forget It (2006)
- ’’My Radio’’ (2013)
- ’’Seasons of Me’’ (2025)

=== Singles ===
- ‘’Laos Simply Beautiful’’ (2018)
- ‘’Jewel of the Mekong’’ (2008)
- ‘’The Good Health’’ (2021)
- ‘’Resolution’’ (2022)
- Pleng Rak Rim Fang Khong, with Sukollawat Kanarot (2007)
- Bor Hoo Pen Yang, with Sukollawat Kanarot (2007)

== Filmography ==
=== Television series ===
- Pleng Rak Rim Fang Khong (2007)
- Rayrai Sao Luk Pa (2008)
- Keb Hom Aom Rak (2012)

=== Variety show ===
- Talok Hok Chak (2011)
