= Alexandra Kavadas =

American-born Greek footballer

Personal information
- Date of birth: 31 August 1983 (age 43)
- Place of birth: Boston, Massachusetts, U.S.
- Position: Defender

College career
Years	Team	Apps	(Gls)
2001	Connecticut Huskies		

Senior career*
Years	Team	Apps	(Gls)
2004	Greater Boston		

International career
2004	Greece	12 (?)	(0)
- * Club domestic league appearances and goals

Alexandra Kavadas (born 31 August 1983), known in Greece as Alexandra Kavvada (Greek: Αλεξάνδρα Καββαδά), is an American-born Greek retired footballer who played as a defender. She has been a member of the Greece women's national team.

== College career ==
Kavadas attended the University of Connecticut in Storrs, Connecticut.

== Club career ==
Kavadas played for Greater Boston in the United States.

== International career ==
Kavadas played for Greece at senior level in the 2004 Summer Olympics.

== See also ==
- Greece at the 2004 Summer Olympics
