= Alexandra Poulovassilis =

Greek and British computer scientist

Alexandra (Alex) Poulovassilis is a Greek and British computer scientist who is a professor emerita of computer science and College Fellow at Birkbeck, University of London. Her research interests have included information management, database schemas and their transformation, information visualization, and immersive learning.

== Education and career ==
Poulovassilis earned a bachelor's degree at the University of Cambridge, worked for IBM in Greece, and returned to the UK for graduate study at Birkbeck. She was a postdoctoral researcher at University College London, and joined the staff of King's College London in 1991.

She became a reader at Birkbeck in 1999, and full professor in 2001. There, she headed the Department of Computer Science and Information Systems from 2003 to 2006 and 2009 to 2010. She was the founding head of the Graduate Research School, serving from 2003 to 2005. She co-directed the London Knowledge Lab from 2003 to 2015, and directed the Birkbeck Knowledge Lab from 2016 to 2021. She became an assistant dean in 2009 and a deputy dean in 2015. She retired as professor emerita in 2021.

== Books ==
Poulovassilis is the editor of books including:

- Web Dynamics: Adapting to Change in Content, Size, Topology and Use (Mark Levene, Springer, 2004)
- The Functional Approach to Data Management: Modeling, Analyzing and Integrating Heterogeneous Data (Peter M. D. Gray, Larry Kerschberg, and Peter J. H. King, Springer, 2004)
- Reasoning in Event-Based Distributed Systems (with Sven Helmer and Fatos Xhafa, Springer, 2011)
- Gender, Science and Innovation: New Perspectives (with Helen Lawton Smith, Colette Henry, and Henry Etzkowitz, Edward Elgar Publishing, 2020)
