= 1999 Sport Club do Recife season =

Sport Recife
1999 season
- Chairman: Luciano Caldas Bivar
- Manager: Ricardo Gomes; Givanildo Oliveira
- Stadium: Ilha do Retiro
- Série A: 22nd
- Pernambucano: Champions (32nd title)
- Copa do Brasil: Second stage
- Copa do Nordeste: Semi-finals
- Top goalscorer: League: Juninho Petrolina and Leonardo (3); All: Leonardo (32)
Home colours	Away colours	Third colours

The 1999 season was Sport Recife's 95th season in the club's history. Sport competed in the Campeonato Pernambucano, Copa do Brasil, Copa do Nordeste and Série A.

== Statistics ==
=== Overall ===
Games played	67 (33 Pernambucano, 10 Copa do Nordeste, 3 Copa do Brasil, 21 Série A)
Games won	31 (21 Pernambucano, 6 Copa do Nordeste, 1 Copa do Brasil, 3 Série A)
Games drawn	23 (10 Pernambucano, 3 Copa do Nordeste, 2 Copa do Brasil, 8 Série A)
Games lost	13 (2 Pernambucano, 1 Copa do Nordeste, 0 Copa do Brasil, 10 Série A)
Goals scored	108
Goals conceded	56
Goal difference	+52
Best results (goal difference)	7–1 (H) v Surubim - Pernambucano - 1999.01.24
Worst result (goal difference)	1–4 (A) v São Paulo - Série A - 1999.10.17
Top scorer	Leonardo (32)

Source: Sport Recife official website

=== Goalscorers ===
Place	Pos.	Nat.	Name	Campeonato Pernambucano	Copa do Nordeste	Copa do Brasil	Série A	Total
1	FW	(Brazil)	Leonardo	24	4	1	3	32
2	FW	(Brazil)	Cris	14	6	0	0	20
3	MF	(Brazil)	Nildo	14	2	0	1	17
4	MF	(Brazil)	Juninho Petrolina	1	3	0	3	7
5	MF	(Brazil)	Léomar	3	1	1	0	5
6	MF	(Brazil)	Leandro Tavares	2	2	0	0	4
7	FW	(Brazil)	Irani	2	0	0	1	3
7	DF	(Brazil)	Márcio	1	0	0	2	3
8	DF	(Honduras)	Chepo	1	0	1	0	2
8	FW	(Brazil)	Jorge Ramos	1	1	0	0	2
8	MF	(Brazil)	Juninho Rodrigues	1	0	0	1	2
8	MF	(Brazil)	Wallace	0	1	0	1	2
8	DF	(Brazil)	Wilson Gottardo	1	1	0	0	2
9	MF	(Brazil)	Gutemberg	1	0	0	0	1
9	DF	(Brazil)	Sandro Blum	0	1	0	0	1
9	DF	(Brazil)	Sangaletti	1	0	0	0	1
9	MF	(Brazil)	Saulo	1	0	0	0	1
9	MF	(Brazil)	Lico	0	0	0	1	1
9	MF	(Brazil)	Reinaldo	0	0	0	1	1
			Own goals	1	0	0	0	1
			Total	69	22	3	14	108

== Competitions ==
=== Campeonato Pernambucano ===
==== First stage ====
24 January 1999 1	Sport	7–1	Surubim	Recife
(UTC-3)	Leonardo,, Cris, Gutemberg; Sangaletti			Stadium: Estádio Adelmar da Costa Carvalho (Ilha do Retiro)

1 February 1999 2	Sport	3–0	Vitória	Recife
(UTC-3)	Leonardo,,			Stadium: Estádio Adelmar da Costa Carvalho (Ilha do Retiro)

4 February 1999 3	Recife	1–1	Sport	Recife
(UTC-3)			Juninho Rodrigues

7 February 1999 4	Sport	3–0	Ferroviário	Recife
(UTC-3)	Leonardo, Cris			Stadium: Estádio Adelmar da Costa Carvalho (Ilha do Retiro)

21 February 1999 5	Santa Cruz	1–1	Sport	Recife
(UTC-3)			Cris	Stadium: Estádio José do Rego Maciel (Arruda)

28 February 1999 6	Sport	2–0	Porto	Recife
(UTC-3)	Leonardo,			Stadium: Estádio Adelmar da Costa Carvalho (Ilha do Retiro)

8 March 1999 7	Unibol	0–0	Sport	Paulista
(UTC-3)				Stadium: Estádio Ademir Cunha

14 March 1999 8	Flamengo de Arcoverde	1–3	Sport	Arcoverde
(UTC-3)			Irani; Nildo; Leonardo	Stadium: Estádio Municipal Áureo Bradley

21 March 1999 9	Sport	4–1	Náutico	Recife
(UTC-3)	Cris, Nildo,			Stadium: Estádio Adelmar da Costa Carvalho (Ilha do Retiro)

==== Second stage ====
28 March 1999 1	Sport	2–0	Unibol	Recife
(UTC-3)	Cris; Márcio			Stadium: Estádio Adelmar da Costa Carvalho (Ilha do Retiro)

4 April 1999 2	Vitória	0–1	Sport	Vitória de Santo Antão
(UTC-3)			Cris

12 April 1999 3	Sport	3–0	Recife	Recife
(UTC-3)	Léomar; Leonardo,			Stadium: Estádio Adelmar da Costa Carvalho (Ilha do Retiro)

18 April 1999 4	Náutico	3–3	Sport	Recife
(UTC-3)			Chepo; Nildo; Leonardo	Stadium: Estádio Eládio de Barros Carvalho (Aflitos)

21 April 1999 5	Sport	2–1	Santa Cruz	Recife
(UTC-3)	Cris; Nildo			Stadium: Estádio Adelmar da Costa Carvalho (Ilha do Retiro)

25 April 1999 6	Unibol	2–2	Sport	Paulista
(UTC-3)			Leonardo; Cris	Stadium: Estádio Ademir Cunha

30 April 1999 7	Sport	4–0	Vitória	Recife
(UTC-3)	Leonardo, Nildo; Juninho Petrolina			Stadium: Estádio Adelmar da Costa Carvalho (Ilha do Retiro)

3 May 1999 8	Recife	0–0	Sport	Recife
(UTC-3)

9 May 1999 9	Sport	2–0	Náutico	Recife
(UTC-3)	Nildo; Saulo			Stadium: Estádio Adelmar da Costa Carvalho (Ilha do Retiro)

16 May 1999 10	Santa Cruz	1–0	Sport	Recife
(UTC-3)				Stadium: Estádio José do Rego Maciel (Arruda)

==== Second stage final ====
19 May 1999	Santa Cruz	1–1	Sport	Recife
(UTC-3)			Cris	Stadium: Estádio José do Rego Maciel (Arruda)

==== Third stage ====
22 May 1999 1	Sport	2–0	Unibol	Recife
(UTC-3)	Leonardo; Jorge Ramos			Stadium: Estádio Adelmar da Costa Carvalho (Ilha do Retiro)

24 May 1999 2	Porto	0–3	Sport	Caruaru
(UTC-3)			Cris, Nildo	Stadium: Estádio Antônio Inácio de Souza

30 May 1999 3	Náutico	1–0	Sport	Recife
(UTC-3)				Stadium: Estádio Eládio de Barros Carvalho (Aflitos)

6 June 1999 4	Sport	0–0	Santa Cruz	Recife
(UTC-3)				Stadium: Estádio Adelmar da Costa Carvalho (Ilha do Retiro)

11 June 1999 5	Vitória	0–3	Sport	Vitória de Santo Antão
(UTC-3)			Leandro Tavares; Leonardo; Irani	Stadium: Estádio Municipal Severino Cândido Carneiro

14 June 1999 6	Sport	3–1	Porto	Recife
(UTC-3)	Leandro Tavares; Leonardo,			Stadium: Estádio Adelmar da Costa Carvalho (Ilha do Retiro)

18 June 1999 7	Unibol	0–2	Sport	Paulista
(UTC-3)			Wilson Gottardo; Nildo	Stadium: Estádio Ademir Cunha

20 June 1999 8	Sport	1–0	Náutico	Recife
(UTC-3)	Nildo			Stadium: Estádio Adelmar da Costa Carvalho (Ilha do Retiro)

27 June 1999 9	Santa Cruz	0–3	Sport	Recife
(UTC-3)			Cris; Nildo; Marcílio (o.g.)	Stadium: Estádio José do Rego Maciel (Arruda)

2 July 1999 10	Sport	2–0	Vitória	Recife
(UTC-3)	Leonardo,			Stadium: Estádio Adelmar da Costa Carvalho (Ilha do Retiro)

==== Third stage final ====
4 July 1999	Sport	2–2	Náutico	Recife
(UTC-3)	Léomar,			Stadium: Estádio Adelmar da Costa Carvalho (Ilha do Retiro)

==== Finals ====
8 July 1999	Santa Cruz	2–2	Sport	Recife
(UTC-3)			Nildo,	Stadium: Estádio José do Rego Maciel (Arruda)

12 July 1999	Sport	2–1	Santa Cruz	Recife
(UTC-3)	Nildo; Leonardo			Stadium: Estádio Adelmar da Costa Carvalho (Ilha do Retiro)

==== Record ====
Final Position	Points	Matches	Wins	Draws	Losses	Goals For	Goals Away	Avg%
1st	73	33	21	10	2	69	20	73%

=== Copa do Nordeste ===
==== Group stage ====
18 February 1999 1	Botafogo–PB	1–1	Sport	João Pessoa
(UTC-3)			Wallace	Stadium: Estádio José Américo de Almeida Filho (Almeidão)

24 March 1999 2	Sport	6–1	Baraúnas	Recife
(UTC-3)	Cris,, Leonardo; Léomar; Nildo			Stadium: Estádio Adelmar da Costa Carvalho (Ilha do Retiro)

7 April 1999 3	Campinense	1–1	Sport	Campina Grande
(UTC-3)			Juninho Petrolina	Stadium: Estádio Governador Ernani Sátyro (Amigão)

15 April 1999 4	Sport	3–0	Campinense	Recife
(UTC-3)	Leonardo; Nildo; Leandro Tavares			Stadium: Estádio Adelmar da Costa Carvalho (Ilha do Retiro)

28 April 1999 5	Baraúnas	2–2	Sport	Mossoró
(UTC-3)			Sandro Blum; Jorge Ramos	Stadium: Estádio Leonardo Nogueira (Nogueirão)

5 May 1999 6	Sport	3–2	Botafogo–PB	Recife
(UTC-3)	Juninho Petrolina, Leandro Tavares			Stadium: Estádio Adelmar da Costa Carvalho (Ilha do Retiro)

==== Second stage ====
26 May 1999	Sport	2–0	Sergipe	Recife
(UTC-3)	Cris,			Stadium: Estádio Adelmar da Costa Carvalho (Ilha do Retiro)

2 June 1999	Sergipe	1–2	Sport	Aracaju
(UTC-3)			Cris; Wilson Gottardo	Stadium: Estádio Lourival Baptista (Batistão)

==== Semi-finals ====
9 June 1999	Vitória	2–1	Sport	Salvador
(UTC-3)			Leonardo	Stadium: Estádio Manoel Barradas (Barradão)

16 June 1999	Sport	1–0 (2–4 p)	Vitória	Recife
(UTC-3)	Leonardo			Stadium: Estádio Adelmar da Costa Carvalho (Ilha do Retiro)

==== Record ====
Final Position	Points	Matches	Wins	Draws	Losses	Goals For	Goals Away	Avg%
3rd	21	10	6	3	1	22	10	70%

=== Copa do Brasil ===
==== First stage ====
4 March 1999	Nacional	0–2	Sport	Manaus
20:30 (UTC-4)			Léomar; Leonardo	Stadium: Estádio Vivaldo Lima (Vivaldão)

==== Second stage ====
18 March 1999	Guarani	0–0	Sport	Campinas
20:30 (UTC-3)				Stadium: Estádio Brinco de Ouro da Princesa

31 March 1999	Sport	1–1(a)	Guarani	Recife
20:30 (UTC-3)	Chepo			Stadium: Estádio Adelmar da Costa Carvalho (Ilha do Retiro)

==== Record ====
Final Position	Points	Matches	Wins	Draws	Losses	Goals For	Goals Away	Avg%
25th	5	3	1	2	0	3	1	55%

=== Série A ===
==== First stage ====
25 July 1999 1	Sport	0–0	Vasco da Gama	Recife
16:00 (UTC-3)				Stadium: Estádio Adelmar da Costa Carvalho (Ilha do Retiro)

1 August 1999 2	Botafogo	0–0	Sport	Niterói
17:00 (UTC-3)				Stadium: Estádio Caio Martins

8 August 1999 3	Sport	1–1	Atlético Mineiro	Recife
17:00 (UTC-3)	Juninho Petrolina			Stadium: Estádio Adelmar da Costa Carvalho (Ilha do Retiro)

15 August 1999 4	Paraná	1–0	Sport	Curitiba
16:00 (UTC-3)				Stadium: Estádio Érton Coelho de Queiróz (Vila Olímpica)

18 August 1999 5	Sport	1–0	Portuguesa	Recife
20:30 (UTC-3)	Reinaldo			Stadium: Estádio Adelmar da Costa Carvalho (Ilha do Retiro)

21 August 1999 6	Sport	0–1	Flamengo	Recife
16:00 (UTC-3)				Stadium: Estádio Adelmar da Costa Carvalho (Ilha do Retiro)

29 August 1999 7	Botafogo–SP	1–1	Sport	Ribeirão Preto
17:00 (UTC-3)			Juninho Rodrigues	Stadium: Estádio Santa Cruz

4 September 1999 8	Sport	1–0	Santos	Recife
18:30 (UTC-3)	Márcio			Stadium: Estádio Adelmar da Costa Carvalho (Ilha do Retiro)

12 September 1999 9	Sport	3–2	Guarani	Recife
17:00 (UTC-3)	Juninho Petrolina; Leonardo; Nildo			Stadium: Estádio Adelmar da Costa Carvalho (Ilha do Retiro)

15 September 1999 10	Palmeiras	1–0	Sport	São Paulo
20:30 (UTC-3)				Stadium: Estádio Palestra Itália (Parque Antártica)

19 September 1999 11	Cruzeiro	1–0	Sport	Belo Horizonte
17:00 (UTC-3)				Stadium: Estádio Governador Magalhães Pinto (Mineirão)

25 September 1999 12	Sport	0–0	Corinthians	Recife
16:00 (UTC-3)				Stadium: Estádio Adelmar da Costa Carvalho (Ilha do Retiro)

29 September 1999 13	Sport	0–0	Internacional	Recife
20:30 (UTC-3)				Stadium: Estádio Adelmar da Costa Carvalho (Ilha do Retiro)

3 October 1999 14	Ponte Preta	2–0	Sport	Campinas
16:00 (UTC-3)				Stadium: Estádio Moisés Lucarelli

10 October 1999 15	Gama	3–2	Sport	Brasília
17:00 (UTC-3)			Juninho Petrolina; Leonardo	Stadium: Estádio Nacional de Brasília Mané Garrincha

13 October 1999 16	Sport	1–1	Coritiba	Recife
20:30 (UTC-3)	Leonardo			Stadium: Estádio Adelmar da Costa Carvalho (Ilha do Retiro)

17 October 1999 17	São Paulo	4–1	Sport	São Paulo
17:00 (UTC-3)			Márcio	Stadium: Estádio Cícero Pompeu de Toledo (Morumbi)

23 October 1999 18	Grêmio	2–1	Sport	Porto Alegre
18:30 (UTC-3)			Irani	Stadium: Estádio Olímpico Monumental

31 October 1999 19	Sport	0–1	Juventude	Recife
17:00 (UTC-3)				Stadium: Estádio Adelmar da Costa Carvalho (Ilha do Retiro)

7 November 1999 20	Sport	1–1	Vitória	Recife
17:00 (UTC-3)	Lico			Stadium: Estádio Adelmar da Costa Carvalho (Ilha do Retiro)

10 November 1999 21	Atlético Paranaense	3–1	Sport	Curitiba
21:40 (UTC-3)			Wallace	Stadium: Estádio Joaquim Américo Guimarães (Arena da Baixada)

==== Record ====
Final Position	Points	Matches	Wins	Draws	Losses	Goals For	Goals Away	Avg%
22nd	17	21	3	8	10	14	25	27%
