= 1998 Sport Club do Recife season =

Sport Recife
1998 season
- Chairman: Luciano Caldas Bivar
- Manager: Mauro Fernandes
- Stadium: Ilha do Retiro
- Série A: Second stage
- Pernambucano: Champions (31st title)
- Copa do Brasil: Quarter finals
- Copa do Nordeste: Group stage
- Top goalscorer: League: Leonardo (9); All: Jackson and Leonardo (18)
Home colours	Away colours

The 1998 season was Sport Recife's 94th season in the club's history. Sport competed in the Campeonato Pernambucano, Copa do Brasil, Copa do Nordeste and Série A.

== Statistics ==
=== Overall ===
Games played	62 (24 Pernambucano, 6 Copa do Nordeste, 6 Copa do Brasil, 26 Série A)
Games won	39 (21 Pernambucano, 3 Copa do Nordeste, 2 Copa do Brasil, 13 Série A)
Games drawn	10 (3 Pernambucano, 1 Copa do Nordeste, 2 Copa do Brasil, 4 Série A)
Games lost	13 (0 Pernambucano, 2 Copa do Nordeste, 2 Copa do Brasil, 9 Série A)
Goals scored	130
Goals conceded	55
Goal difference	+75
Best results (goal difference)	6–0 (H) v Treze - Copa do Nordeste - 1998.03.12
Worst result (goal difference)	0–3 (A) v Santos - Série A - 1998.11.25
Top scorer	Jackson and Leonardo (18)

Source: Sport Recife official website

=== Goalscorers ===
Place	Pos.	Nat.	Name	Campeonato Pernambucano	Copa do Nordeste	Copa do Brasil	Série A	Total
1	MF	(Brazil)	Jackson	7	2	4	5	18
1	FW	(Brazil)	Leonardo	5	3	1	9	18
2	MF	(Brazil)	Leandro Tavares	8	4	2	3	17
3	FW	(Brazil)	Maurício Pantera	10	2	0	0	12
4	FW	(Brazil)	Irani	6	0	0	3	9
5	DF	(Brazil)	Márcio	5	1	2	0	8
5	MF	(Brazil)	Valdomiro	4	2	0	2	8
6	FW	(Brazil)	Róbson	0	0	0	6	6
6	DF	(Brazil)	Ronaldo	3	0	1	2	6
7	MF	(Brazil)	Juninho Rodrigues	4	1	0	0	5
7	MF	(Brazil)	Lima Sergipano	3	0	0	2	5
7	FW	(Brazil)	Marcelo Rocha	4	0	1	0	5
8		(Brazil)	Jefferson	0	0	0	2	2
8	MF	(Brazil)	Wallace	1	0	0	1	2
9	DF	(Brazil)	Alexandre Lopes	0	0	0	1	1
9	FW	(Brazil)	Batistinha	1	0	0	0	1
9	FW	(Brazil)	Chris	0	0	0	1	1
9	DF	(Brazil)	Édson	1	0	0	0	1
9	MF	(Brazil)	Gutemberg	1	0	0	0	1
9	MF	(Brazil)	Nildo	0	0	0	1	1
9	FW	(Brazil)	Saulo	0	1	0	0	1
			Own goals	0	1	0	0	1
			Total	63	17	11	38	129

== Competitions ==
=== Campeonato Pernambuco ===
==== First stage ====
25 January 1998 1	Sport	4–0	Petrolândia	Recife
(UTC-3)	Ronaldo; Juninho Rodrigues, Valdomiro			Stadium: Estádio Adelmar da Costa Carvalho (Ilha do Retiro)

28 January 1998 2	1º de Maio	0–0	Sport	Petrolina
(UTC-3)

1 February 1998 3	Sport	4–0	Central	Recife
(UTC-3)	Wallace; Jackson; Leandro Tavares; Maurício Pantera			Stadium: Estádio Adelmar da Costa Carvalho (Ilha do Retiro)

7 February 1998 4	Sport	4–0	Ferroviário–ST	Recife
(UTC-3)	Édson; Márcio, Maurício Pantera			Stadium: Estádio Adelmar da Costa Carvalho (Ilha do Retiro)

15 February 1998 5	Vitória	1–3	Sport	Vitória de Santo Antão
(UTC-3)			Maurício Pantera; Ronaldo; Leandro Tavares

1 March 1998 6	Flamengo de Arcoverde	0–3	Sport	Arcoverde
(UTC-3)			Jackson; Marcelo Rocha,

8 March 1998 7	Sport	2–0	Porto	Recife
(UTC-3)	Leonardo; Maurício Pantera			Stadium: Estádio Adelmar da Costa Carvalho (Ilha do Retiro)

15 March 1998 8	Náutico	0–2	Sport	Recife
(UTC-3)			Maurício Pantera; Leonardo	Stadium: Estádio Eládio de Barros Carvalho (Aflitos)

21 March 1998 9	Sport	4–0	Cabense	Recife
(UTC-3)	Leandro Tavares; Leonardo; Jackson; Marcelo Rocha			Stadium: Estádio Adelmar da Costa Carvalho (Ilha do Retiro)

23 March 1998 10	Recife	1–5	Sport	Goiana
(UTC-3)			Valdomiro; Leandro Tavares; Maurício Pantera, Juninho Rodrigues

29 March 1998 11	Sport	4–1	Santa Cruz	Recife
(UTC-3)	Maurício Pantera; Ronaldo; Márcio; Jackson			Stadium: Estádio Adelmar da Costa Carvalho (Ilha do Retiro)

==== Second stage ====
5 April 1998 1	Sport	3–1	Central	Recife
(UTC-3)	Leandro Tavares; Marcelo Rocha; Leonardo			Stadium: Estádio Adelmar da Costa Carvalho (Ilha do Retiro)

12 April 1998 2	Ferroviário–ST	1–1	Sport	Serra Talhada
(UTC-3)			Maurício Pantera

19 April 1998 3	Porto	1–3	Sport	Caruaru
(UTC-3)			Leonardo; Gutemberg; Juninho Rodrigues

22 April 1998 4	Sport	4–0	Vitória	Recife
(UTC-3)	Márcio; Irani, Valdomiro			Stadium: Estádio Adelmar da Costa Carvalho (Ilha do Retiro)

26 April 1998 5	Sport	4–1	1º de Maio	Recife
(UTC-3)	Jackson; Leandro Tavares, Valdomiro			Stadium: Estádio Adelmar da Costa Carvalho (Ilha do Retiro)

3 May 1998 6	Santa Cruz	1–2	Sport	Recife
(UTC-3)			Leandro Tavares; Irani	Stadium: Estádio José do Rego Maciel (Arruda)

9 May 1998 7	Sport	1–0	Náutico	Recife
(UTC-3)	Maurício Pantera			Stadium: Estádio Adelmar da Costa Carvalho (Ilha do Retiro)

==== Third stage ====
17 May 1998 1	Porto	0–2	Sport	Caruaru
(UTC-3)			Batistinha; Márcio

20 May 1998 2	Sport	2–0	Ferroviário–ST	Recife
(UTC-3)	Lima Sergipano; Jackson			Stadium: Estádio Adelmar da Costa Carvalho (Ilha do Retiro)

24 May 1998 3	Náutico	0–0	Sport	Recife
(UTC-3)				Stadium: Estádio Eládio de Barros Carvalho (Aflitos)

27 May 1998 4	Sport	2–1	Recife	Recife
(UTC-3)	Lima Sergipano,			Stadium: Estádio Adelmar da Costa Carvalho (Ilha do Retiro)

31 May 1998 5	Sport	2–0	Santa Cruz	Recife
(UTC-3)	Irani; Jackson			Stadium: Estádio Adelmar da Costa Carvalho (Ilha do Retiro)

==== Final ====
7 June 1998	Sport	2–0	Porto	Recife
(UTC-3)	Irani,			Stadium: Estádio Adelmar da Costa Carvalho (Ilha do Retiro)

==== Record ====
Final Position	Points	Matches	Wins	Draws	Losses	Goals For	Goals Away	Avg%
1st	66	24	21	3	0	64	9	91%

=== Copa do Nordeste ===
==== Group stage ====
11 February 1998 1	Treze	2–5	Sport	Campina Grande
(UTC-3)			Maurício Pantera, Márcio; Leonardo; Leandro Tavares	Stadium: Estádio Governador Ernani Sátyro (Amigão)

26 February 1998 2	Sport	4–1	ABC	Recife
(UTC-3)	Jackson; Wesley (o.g.); Leandro Tavares; Valdomiro			Stadium: Estádio Adelmar da Costa Carvalho (Ilha do Retiro)

6 March 1998 3	ABC	2–1	Sport	Natal
(UTC-3)			Leonardo	Stadium: Estádio Dr. João Cláudio Vasconcelos Machado (Machadão)

10 March 1998 4	Sport	0–0	Fortaleza	Recife
(UTC-3)				Stadium: Estádio Adelmar da Costa Carvalho (Ilha do Retiro)

12 March 1998 5	Sport	6–0	Treze	Recife
(UTC-3)	Jackson; Leandro Tavares, Leonardo; Saulo; Juninho Rodrigues			Stadium: Estádio Adelmar da Costa Carvalho (Ilha do Retiro)

19 March 1998 6	Fortaleza	2–1	Sport	Fortaleza
(UTC-3)			Valdomiro	Stadium: Estádio Presidente Vargas

==== Record ====
Final Position	Points	Matches	Wins	Draws	Losses	Goals For	Goals Away	Avg%
9th	10	6	3	1	2	17	7	55%

=== Copa do Brasil ===
==== First stage ====
18 February 1998	Portuguesa	2–1	Sport	São Paulo
(UTC-3)			Leonardo	Stadium: Estádio Oswaldo Teixeira Duarte (Canindé)

6 March 1998	Sport	4–2	Portuguesa	Recife
(UTC-3)	Jackson; Marcelo Rocha; Márcio; Leandro Tavares			Stadium: Estádio Adelmar da Costa Carvalho (Ilha do Retiro)

==== Second stage ====
26 March 1998	América–MG	3–3	Sport	Belo Horizonte
(UTC-3)			Jackson; Ronaldo; Márcio	Stadium: Estádio Raimundo Sampaio (Independência)

16 April 1998	Sport	2–1	América–MG	Recife
(UTC-3)	Leandro Tavares; Jackson			Stadium: Estádio Adelmar da Costa Carvalho (Ilha do Retiro)

==== Quarter-finals ====
7 May 1998	Sport	0–2	Palmeiras	Recife
(UTC-3)				Stadium: Estádio Adelmar da Costa Carvalho (Ilha do Retiro)

12 May 1998	Palmeiras	1–1	Sport	São Paulo
(UTC-3)			Jackson	Stadium: Estádio Palestra Itália (Parque Antártica)

==== Record ====
Final Position	Points	Matches	Wins	Draws	Losses	Goals For	Goals Away	Avg%
8th	8	6	2	2	2	11	11	44%

=== Série A ===
==== First stage ====
26 July 1998 1	América–RN	0–4	Sport	Natal
(UTC-3)			Leonardo, Chris; Jackson	Stadium: Estádio Dr. João Cláudio Vasconcelos Machado (Machadão)

2 August 1998 2	Sport	2–0	Atlético Paranaense	Recife
(UTC-3)	Leonardo; Jefferson			Stadium: Estádio Adelmar da Costa Carvalho (Ilha do Retiro)

5 August 1998 3	Sport	2–1	Vitória	Recife
(UTC-3)	Nildo; Jefferson			Stadium: Estádio Adelmar da Costa Carvalho (Ilha do Retiro)

9 August 1998 4	Goiás	2–0	Sport	Goiânia
(UTC-3)				Stadium: Estádio do Governo do Estado de Goiás (Serra Dourada)

12 August 1998 5	Palmeiras	1–2	Sport	São Paulo
(UTC-3)	Rogério		Leonardo; Jackson	Stadium: Estádio Palestra Italia (Parque Antarctica); Attendance: 5,636; Referee: Marcio Rezende de Freitas

16 August 1998 6	Sport	1–0	São Paulo	Recife
(UTC-3)	Róbson 90'			Stadium: Estádio Adelmar da Costa Carvalho (Ilha do Retiro)

23 August 1998 7	Coritiba	0–0	Sport	Curitiba
(UTC-3)				Stadium: Estádio Major Antônio (Couto Pereira)

30 August 1998 8	Sport	4–1	Paraná	Recife
(UTC-3)	Leonardo; Leandro Tavares, Róbson			Stadium: Estádio Adelmar da Costa Carvalho (Ilha do Retiro)

6 September 1998 9	Santos	0–0	Sport	Santos
(UTC-3)				Stadium: Estádio Urbano Caldeira (Vila Belmiro)

9 September 1998 10	Vasco da Gama	0–0	Sport	Rio de Janeiro
(UTC-3)				Stadium: Estádio Vasco da Gama (São Januário)

12 September 1998 11	Sport	0–2	Corinthians	Recife
16:00 (UTC-3)			Marcelinho Carioca 81', 90' (pen.)	Stadium: Estádio Adelmar da Costa Carvalho (Ilha do Retiro); Attendance: 53,033; Referee: Reinaldo Ribas Vieira

16 September 1998 12	Sport	1–0	Bragantino	Recife
(UTC-3)	Jackson			Stadium: Estádio Adelmar da Costa Carvalho (Ilha do Retiro)

20 September 1998 13	Sport	5–0	Grêmio	Recife
(UTC-3)	Leonardo; Alexandre Lopes; Ronaldo, Irani			Stadium: Estádio Adelmar da Costa Carvalho (Ilha do Retiro)

24 September 1998 14	Portuguesa	2–0	Sport	São Paulo
(UTC-3)				Stadium: Estádio Oswaldo Teixeira Duarte (Canindé)

27 September 1998 15	Sport	1–1	Cruzeiro	Recife
(UTC-3)	Leandro Tavares			Stadium: Estádio Adelmar da Costa Carvalho (Ilha do Retiro)

3 October 1998 16	Ponte Preta	2–1	Sport	Campinas
(UTC-3)			Leonardo	Stadium: Estádio Moisés Lucarelli

7 October 1998 17	Flamengo	3–2	Sport	Rio de Janeiro
(UTC-3)			Róbson; Lima Sergipano	Stadium: Estádio Jornalista Mário Filho (Maracanã)

11 October 1998 18	Sport	3–2	América–MG	Recife
(UTC-3)	Irani; Leonardo,			Stadium: Estádio Adelmar da Costa Carvalho (Ilha do Retiro)

18 October 1998 19	Juventude	1–0	Sport	Caxias do Sul
(UTC-3)				Stadium: Estádio Alfredo Jaconi

21 October 1998 20	Internacional	1–2	Sport	Porto Alegre
(UTC-3)			Irani; Jackson	Stadium: Estádio José Pinheiro Borda (Beira-Rio)

24 October 1998 21	Sport	2–1	Botafogo	Recife
(UTC-3)	Valdomiro; Jackson			Stadium: Estádio Adelmar da Costa Carvalho (Ilha do Retiro)

1 November 1998 22	Atlético Mineiro	1–0	Sport	Belo Horizonte
(UTC-3)				Stadium: Estádio Governador Magalhães Pinto (Mineirão)

12 November 1998 23	Sport	2–1	Guarani	Recife
(UTC-3)	Valdomiro; Róbson			Stadium: Estádio Adelmar da Costa Carvalho (Ilha do Retiro)

==== Second stage ====
15 November 1998	Sport	3–1	Santos	Recife
(UTC-3)	Róbson 66'; Wallace 69'; Lima Sergipano 77'		Argel 87'	Stadium: Estádio Adelmar da Costa Carvalho (Ilha do Retiro); Attendance: 11,249; Referee: Luciano Augusto Almeida

21 November 1998	Santos	2–1	Sport	Santos
(UTC-3)	Eduardo Marques 32'; Róbson Luís 75'		Róbson 61'	Stadium: Estádio Urbano Caldeira (Vila Belmiro); Attendance: 25,229; Referee: Jorge Travassos

25 November 1998	Santos	3–0	Sport	Santos
(UTC-3)	Alessandro 24'; Viola 50', 90+3'			Stadium: Estádio Urbano Caldeira (Vila Belmiro); Attendance: 25,229; Referee: Cláudio Vinícius Cerdeira

==== Record ====
Final Position	Points	Matches	Wins	Draws	Losses	Goals For	Goals Away	Avg%
7th	43	26	13	4	9	38	28	55%
