= 1997 Sport Club do Recife season =

Sport Recife
1997 season
- Chairman: Luciano Caldas Bivar
- Manager: Hélio dos Anjos
- Stadium: Ilha do Retiro
- Série A: First stage
- Pernambucano: Champions (30th title)
- Copa do Brasil: Second stage
- Copa do Nordeste: Semi-finals
Home colours	Away colours

The 1997 season was Sport Recife's 93rd season in the club's history. Sport competed in the Campeonato Pernambucano, Copa do Brasil, Copa do Nordeste and Série A.

== Statistics ==
=== Overall ===
Games played	60 (6 Copa do Nordeste, 27 Pernambucano, 2 Copa do Brasil, 25 Série A)
Games won	30 (3 Copa do Nordeste, 18 Pernambucano, 0 Copa do Brasil, 9 Série A)
Games drawn	17 (3 Copa do Nordeste, 7 Pernambucano, 1 Copa do Brasil, 6 Série A)
Games lost	13 (0 Copa do Nordeste, 2 Pernambucano, 1 Copa do Brasil, 10 Série A)
Goals scored	110
Goals conceded	61
Goal difference	+49
Best results (goal difference)	6–1 (H) v Ypiranga - Pernambucano - 1997.02.16
Worst result (goal difference)	0–3 (A) v Atlético Paranaense - Copa do Brasil - 1997.03.14
Top scorer	

Source: Sport Recife official website

=== Copa do Nordeste ===
==== First round ====
29 January 1997	Botafogo–PB	1–4	Sport	João Pessoa
(UTC-3)			Luís Müller, Leonardo; Jackson	Stadium: Estádio José Américo de Almeida Filho (Almeidão)

5 February 1997	Sport	3–0	Botafogo–PB	Recife
(UTC-3)	Luís Müller; Dedé; Didi			Stadium: Estádio Adelmar da Costa Carvalho (Ilha do Retiro)

==== Second round ====
20 February 1997	Sport	4–0	ABC	Recife
(UTC-3)	Leonardo; Wanderley; Valdomiro; Ildo			Stadium: Estádio Adelmar da Costa Carvalho (Ilha do Retiro)

27 February 1997	ABC	0–0	Sport	Natal
(UTC-3)				Stadium: Estádio Dr. João Cláudio Vasconcelos Machado (Machadão)

==== Semi-finals ====
26 March 1997	Bahia	0–0	Sport	Salvador
(UTC-3)				Stadium: Estádio Octávio Mangabeira (Fonte Nova)

23 April 1997	Sport	1–1	Bahia	Recife
(UTC-3)	Márcio		Edmundo	Stadium: Estádio Adelmar da Costa Carvalho (Ilha do Retiro)

==== Record ====
Final Position	Points	Matches	Wins	Draws	Losses	Goals For	Goals Away	Avg%
3rd	12	6	3	3	0	12	2	66%

=== Campeonato Pernambucano ===
==== First stage ====
16 February 1997 1	Sport	6–1	Ypiranga	Recife
(UTC-3)	Juninho Petrolina; Leonardo, Luís Müller; Valdomiro,			Stadium: Estádio Adelmar da Costa Carvalho (Ilha do Retiro)

23 February 1997 2	Náutico	2–2	Sport	Recife
(UTC-3)	Paulo André; Romildo		Márcio; Luís Müller	Stadium: Estádio Eládio de Barros Carvalho (Aflitos)

2 March 1997 3	Flamengo de Arcoverde	0–0	Sport	Arcoverde
(UTC-3)				Stadium: Estádio Municipal Áureo Bradley

9 March 1997 4	Sport	4–1	Santa Cruz	Recife
(UTC-3)	Valdomiro; Juninho Petrolina, Luís Müller		Ramos	Stadium: Estádio Adelmar da Costa Carvalho (Ilha do Retiro)

11 March 1997 5	Sport	5–0	Central	Recife
(UTC-3)	Juninho Petrolina; Luís Müller; Leonardo; Jackson; Valdomiro			Stadium: Estádio Adelmar da Costa Carvalho (Ilha do Retiro)

16 March 1997 6	Centro Limoeirense	1–5	Sport	Limoeiro
(UTC-3)			Márcio, Saulo; Luís Müller; Valdomiro	Stadium: Estádio José Vareda

==== First stage final ====
23 March 1997	Sport	3–0	Santa Cruz	Recife
(UTC-3)	Juninho Petrolina; Leonardo; Dedé			Stadium: Estádio Adelmar da Costa Carvalho (Ilha do Retiro)

==== Second stage ====
30 March 1997 1	Recife	1–3	Sport	Goiana
(UTC-3)			Juninho Petrolina; Márcio,

3 April 1997 2	Sport	2–2	Flamengo de Arcoverde	Recife
(UTC-3)	Batistinha,			Stadium: Estádio Adelmar da Costa Carvalho (Ilha do Retiro)

7 April 1997 3	Sport	5–1	Náutico	Recife
(UTC-3)	Leonardo,, Leomar; Juninho Petrolina		Romildo	Stadium: Estádio Adelmar da Costa Carvalho (Ilha do Retiro)

13 April 1997 4	Sport	1–0	Cabense	Recife
(UTC-3)	Valdomiro			Stadium: Estádio Adelmar da Costa Carvalho (Ilha do Retiro)

17 April 1997 5	Santa Cruz	0–1	Sport	Recife
(UTC-3)			Leonardo	Stadium: Estádio José do Rego Maciel (Arruda)

20 April 1997 6	Sport	0–2	Recife	Recife
(UTC-3)				Stadium: Estádio Adelmar da Costa Carvalho (Ilha do Retiro)

==== Second stage finals ====
27 April 1997	Recife	0–1	Sport	Recife
(UTC-3)			Leomar

1 May 1997	Sport	2–1	Recife	Recife
(UTC-3)	Jackson; Leonardo			Stadium: Estádio Adelmar da Costa Carvalho (Ilha do Retiro)

==== Third stage ====
4 May 1997 1	Sport	2–0	Vitória	Recife
(UTC-3)	Dedé; Didi			Stadium: Estádio Adelmar da Costa Carvalho (Ilha do Retiro)

7 May 1997 2	Porto	1–1	Sport	Caruaru
(UTC-3)			Leonardo

10 May 1997 3	Sport	3–1	Recife	Recife
(UTC-3)	Valdomiro, Leonardo			Stadium: Estádio Adelmar da Costa Carvalho (Ilha do Retiro)

14 May 1997 4	Sport	3–0	Central	Recife
(UTC-3)	Valdomiro; Juninho Petrolina; Leonardo			Stadium: Estádio Adelmar da Costa Carvalho (Ilha do Retiro)

18 May 1997 5	Náutico	2–1	Sport	Recife
(UTC-3)	Lico; Leandro		Jackson	Stadium: Estádio Eládio de Barros Carvalho (Aflitos)

==== Third stage final ====
21 May 1997	Sport	1–0	Porto	Recife
(UTC-3)	Marcinho Sergipano			Stadium: Estádio Adelmar da Costa Carvalho (Ilha do Retiro)

==== Fourth stage ====
25 May 1997 1	Cabense	2–2	Sport	Cabo de Santo Agostinho
(UTC-3)			Didi,

28 May 1997 2	Sport	3–1	Porto	Recife
(UTC-3)	Juninho Petrolina, Didi			Stadium: Estádio Adelmar da Costa Carvalho (Ilha do Retiro)

1 June 1997 3	Sport	2–2	Santa Cruz	Recife
(UTC-3)	Dedé; Dário		André Jacaré; Maurílio	Stadium: Estádio Adelmar da Costa Carvalho (Ilha do Retiro)

7 June 1997 4	Sport	1–1	Recife	Recife
(UTC-3)	Juninho Petrolina			Stadium: Estádio Adelmar da Costa Carvalho (Ilha do Retiro)

11 June 1997 5	Central	1–2	Sport	Caruaru
(UTC-3)			Leonardo; Didi

==== Fourth stage final ====
21 May 1997	Porto	0–2	Sport	Caruaru
(UTC-3)			Leonardo; Didi

==== Record ====
Final Position	Points	Matches	Wins	Draws	Losses	Goals For	Goals Away	Avg%
1st	61	27	18	7	2	63	23	75%

=== Copa do Brasil ===
==== Second stage ====
14 March 1997	Atlético Paranaense	3–0	Sport	Curitiba
(UTC-3)	Andrei; Paulo Miranda; Alex			Stadium: Centro Poliesportivo Pinheiro (Pinheirão)

20 March 1997	Sport	1–1	Atlético Paranaense	Recife
(UTC-3)	Neumar		Paulo Rink	Stadium: Estádio Adelmar da Costa Carvalho (Ilha do Retiro)

==== Record ====
Final Position	Points	Matches	Wins	Draws	Losses	Goals For	Goals Away	Avg%
31st	1	2	0	1	1	1	4	16%

=== Série A ===
==== First stage ====
6 July 1997 1	Paraná	2–1	Sport	Curitiba
(UTC-3)	Caio Júnior,		Dedé	Stadium: Estádio Durival Britto e Silva (Vila Capanema)

9 July 1997 2	Sport	1–1	América–RN	Recife
(UTC-3)	Vágner		Gito	Stadium: Estádio Adelmar da Costa Carvalho (Ilha do Retiro)

12 July 1997 3	Coritiba	2–0	Sport	Curitiba
(UTC-3)	Rogério; Eliomar			Stadium: Estádio Major Antônio (Couto Pereira)

16 July 1997 4	Sport	3–1	Atlético Paranaense	Recife
(UTC-3)	Dedé; Didi; Márcio		Paulo Miranda	Stadium: Estádio Adelmar da Costa Carvalho (Ilha do Retiro)

20 July 1997 5	Vitória	3–1	Sport	Salvador
(UTC-3)	Bebeto, Gil Baiano		Dedé	Stadium: Estádio Manoel Barradas (Barradão)

26 July 1997 6	Sport	1–1	Santos	Recife
(UTC-3)	Alexandre Lopes		Arinélson	Stadium: Estádio Adelmar da Costa Carvalho (Ilha do Retiro)

30 July 1997 7	Sport	1–0	Flamengo	Recife
(UTC-3)	Leonardo			Stadium: Estádio Adelmar da Costa Carvalho (Ilha do Retiro)

4 August 1997 8	Grêmio	2–1	Sport	Porto Alegre
20:30 (UTC-3)	Arce 5'; Tinga 36'		Paulo Henrique 72'	Stadium: Estádio Olímpico Monumental; Attendance: 7,377; Referee: Dalmo Bozzano

16 August 1997 9	União São João	1–1	Sport	Araras
(UTC-3)	Augusto 90+3'		Leonardo	Stadium: Estádio Doutor Hermínio Ometto

20 August 1997 10	Sport	2–0	Bahia	Recife
(UTC-3)	Didi; Juninho			Stadium: Estádio Adelmar da Costa Carvalho (Ilha do Retiro)

24 August 1997 11	Atlético Mineiro	1–1	Sport	Belo Horizonte
(UTC-3)	Marcos		Luís Müller	Stadium: Estádio Governador Magalhães Pinto (Mineirão)

30 August 1997 12	Sport	2–3	Vasco da Gama	Recife
(UTC-3)	Dedé (pen.); Paulo Henrique (pen.)		Edmundo 20' (pen.), (pen.),	Stadium: Estádio Adelmar da Costa Carvalho (Ilha do Retiro)

7 September 1997 13	Sport	1–0	Goiás	Recife
(UTC-3)	Paulo Henrique			Stadium: Estádio Adelmar da Costa Carvalho (Ilha do Retiro)

11 September 1997 14	Criciúma	2–0	Sport	Criciúma
(UTC-3)	Marcelo Rocha; Marcos Paulista			Stadium: Estádio Heriberto Hülse

14 September 1997 15	Sport	2–0	Internacional	Recife
(UTC-3)	Leonardo 8'; Jackson 66'			Stadium: Estádio Adelmar da Costa Carvalho (Ilha do Retiro)

17 September 1997 16	Sport	1–2	Portuguesa	Recife
(UTC-3)	Dedé (pen.)		Aílton; Tuta	Stadium: Estádio Adelmar da Costa Carvalho (Ilha do Retiro)

21 September 1997 17	Fluminense	0–3	Sport	Rio de Janeiro
(UTC-3)			Didi, Jackson 64'	Stadium: Estádio Manoel Schwartz Stadium (Laranjeiras)

28 September 1997 18	Sport	4–1	Cruzeiro	Recife
(UTC-3)	Juninho; Leonardo (pen.); Jackson; Luís Müller		Donizete	Stadium: Estádio Adelmar da Costa Carvalho (Ilha do Retiro)

2 October 1997 19	Botafogo	1–0	Sport	Niterói
(UTC-3)	Sinval			Stadium: Estádio Caio Martins

5 October 1997 20	São Paulo	4–2	Sport	São Paulo
(UTC-3)	Reinaldo; Marcelinho Paraíba; Aristizábal,		Leonardo; Didi	Stadium: Estádio Cícero Pompeu de Toledo (Morumbi)

12 October 1997 21	Sport	1–2	Juventude	João Pessoa
(UTC-3)	Didi		Macalé,	Stadium: Estádio José Américo de Almeida Filho (Almeidão)

19 October 1997 22	Guarani	1–1	Sport	Campinas
(UTC-3)	Aílton		Leomar	Stadium: Estádio Brinco de Ouro da Princesa

26 October 1997 23	Sport	2–1	Bragantino	João Pessoa
(UTC-3)	Didi; Luís Müller		Geraldo (pen.)	Stadium: Estádio José Américo de Almeida Filho (Almeidão)

1 November 1997 24	Corinthians	0–1	Sport	São Paulo
(UTC-3)			Didi	Stadium: Estádio Cícero Pompeu de Toledo (Morumbi)

9 November 1997 25	Sport	1–1	Palmeiras	Recife
(UTC-3)	Didi		Cris	Stadium: Estádio Adelmar da Costa Carvalho (Ilha do Retiro)

==== Record ====
Final Position	Points	Matches	Wins	Draws	Losses	Goals For	Goals Away	Avg%
11th	33	25	9	6	10	34	32	44%
