= Corozal =

Corozal may refer to:

== Places ==
=== Belize ===
- Corozal District
  - Corozal Town, capital of the district
    - Corozal Airport
    - Corozal Junior College
  - Corozal Sugar Factory, in Libertad
- Corozal Bay, an inlet of Chetumal Bay

=== Colombia ===
- Corozal, Sucre, a city

=== Honduras ===
- Corozal, Honduras, a village

=== Mexico ===
- Frontera Corozal, Chiapas

=== Panama ===
- Corozal, Los Santos, a corregimiento
- Corozal, Panama Canal Zone, a township in the Panama Canal Zone
  - Corozal American Cemetery and Memorial, in the township
- Corozal, Veraguas, a corregimiento

=== Puerto Rico ===
- Corozal, Puerto Rico, a town and municipality
  - Corozal barrio-pueblo, administrative center of the municipality
- Corozal River

=== Elsewhere ===
- Corozal (crater), on Mars

== Other uses ==
- Corozal (dredger), a vessel used in the construction of the Panama Canal
- Plataneros de Corozal, a volleyball club in Corozal, Puerto Rico
