= Mazapan School =

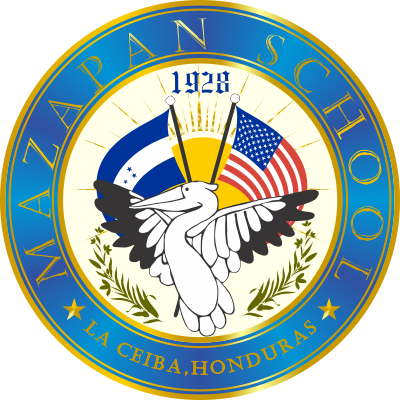

Location
- La Ceiba, Atlantida; Honduras
- Coordinates: 15.7841°N 86.7948°W

Information
- Type: Co-educational bilingual
- Established: 1928
- Superintendent: Matthew Keiser
- Mascot: Pelican
- Website: www.mazapanschool.edu.hn

Mazapan School is a N-12 co-educational bilingual school offering a US-style college preparatory instruction program. Owned and operated by Standard Fruit de Honduras (Dole), Mazapan School is located in La Ceiba, Honduras. Founded in 1928, the landscaped campus is located on 5 acres (20,000 m^{2}). The 300+ students attending Mazapan School are taught in English and Spanish, and receive a U.S. High School diploma and a Honduran Baccalaureate degree.

== History ==
Mazapan School was founded in 1928 by the Standard Fruit Company, known today as Dole. The company had the dilemma of keeping valuable expatriate employees with children in La Ceiba, Honduras. A lack of an American-style school meant children had to be sent to boarding schools in the United States at a young age. This need gave birth to the idea of starting a school. Mazapan School, owned and operated by the company, opened its doors on March 12, 1928, with Grades 1–6 with 38 students.

Today, the Mazapan School is located on 5 acres (20,000 m^{2}) of land in the heart of the city. A coeducational, day school, it offers bilingual (English/Spanish) educational programs from grades Nursery through 12 with the continued support of Dole. Upon graduation, Mazapan students are conferred an American High School Diploma, accredited by the Cognia, and a Honduran Bachillerato Diploma, accredited by the Honduran Ministry of Education.

== Accreditation ==
Mazapan School is accredited by the Cognia, and the Honduran Ministry of Education. A U.S. High School Diploma and the Honduran Bachillerato can both be obtained, giving students the choice of attending any University in the world after graduation.

Mazapan is a member of AASCA (Association of American Schools in Central America), ABSH (Association of Bilingual Schools of Honduras), NASS, IRC (Inter-regional Center) and AAIE (Association of American International Education).
