= La Ceiba =

- Municipality
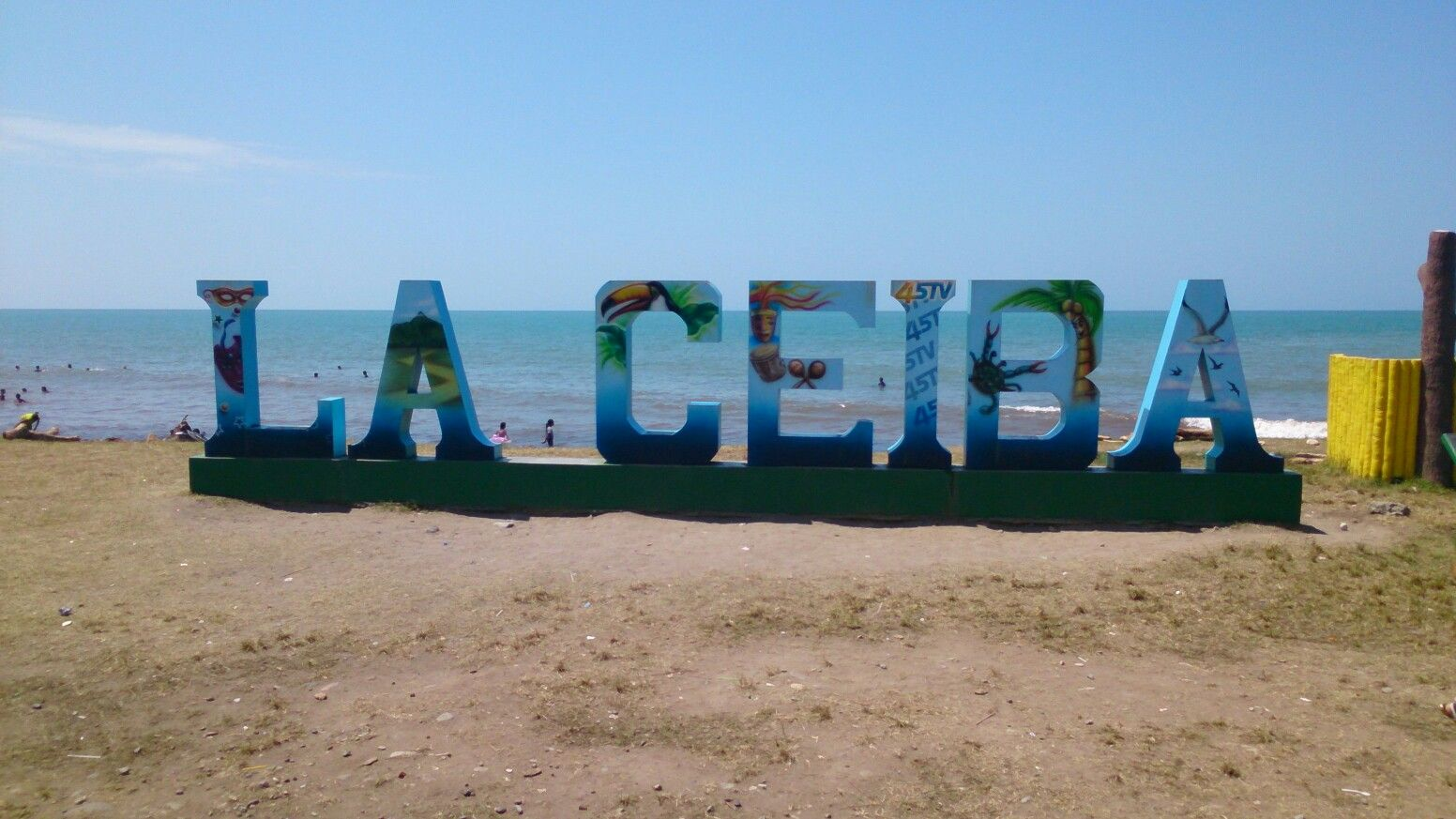
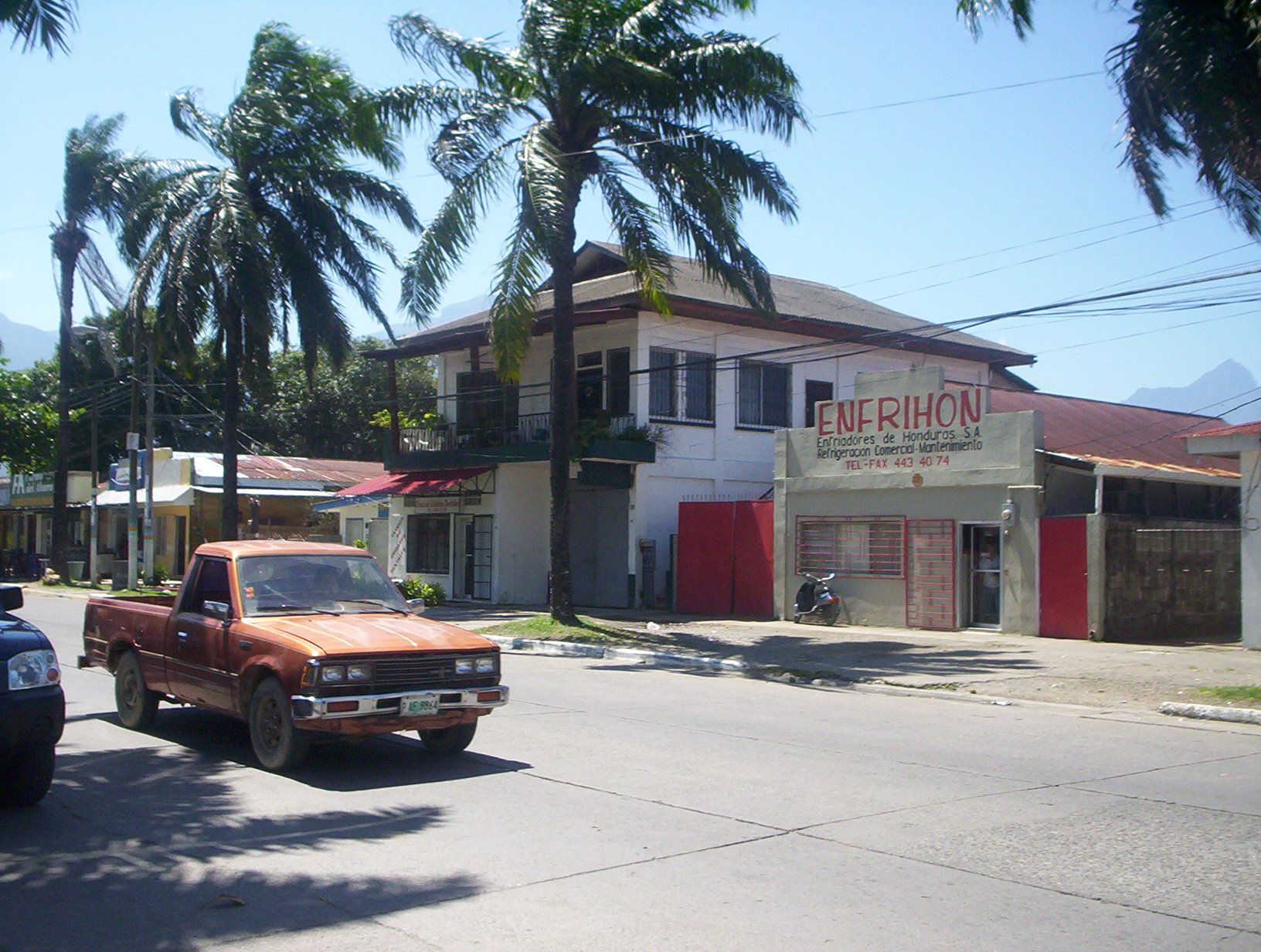
- Monumental letters at the beach Street in La Ceiba
- Seal
- Nickname: La novia de Honduras (The bride of Honduras)
- Location within Honduras Location within Central America
- Coordinates: 15°46′45″N 86°47′35″W
- Country: Honduras
- Department: Atlántida
- Founded: 23 August 1877; 149 years ago

Government
  - Mayor: Bader Dip (PL)

Area
  - Municipality: 654 km^{2} (253 sq mi)
  - Urban: 60 km^{2} (23 sq mi)
- Elevation: 3 m (9.8 ft)

Population (2023 projection)
  - Municipality: 232,696 (4th in Honduras)
  - Urban: 215,973
  - Urban density: 4,100/km^{2} (10,700/sq mi)
- Time zone: UTC−06:00 (CST)
- Postal code: 31101
- Climate: Am
- Website: alcaldialaceiba.hn

La Ceiba (Spanish pronunciation: [la ˈsejβa]) is a municipality, the capital of the Honduran department of Atlántida and a port city on the northern coast of Honduras in Central America. It is located on the southern edge of the Caribbean, forming part of the south eastern boundary of the Gulf of Honduras. With an estimated population of 209,000 living in approximately 170 residential areas (called colonias or barrios), it is the fourth most populous and third most important city in the country.

La Ceiba was officially founded on 23 August 1877. The city was named after a giant ceiba tree that grew near the old dock. The city has been officially proclaimed the "Eco-Tourism Capital of Honduras," as well as the "Entertainment Capital of Honduras". Every year, on the third or fourth Saturday of May, the city holds its famous carnival to commemorate Isidore the Laborer (Spanish San Isidro Labrador), which is attended by approximately 500,000 tourists.

== History ==
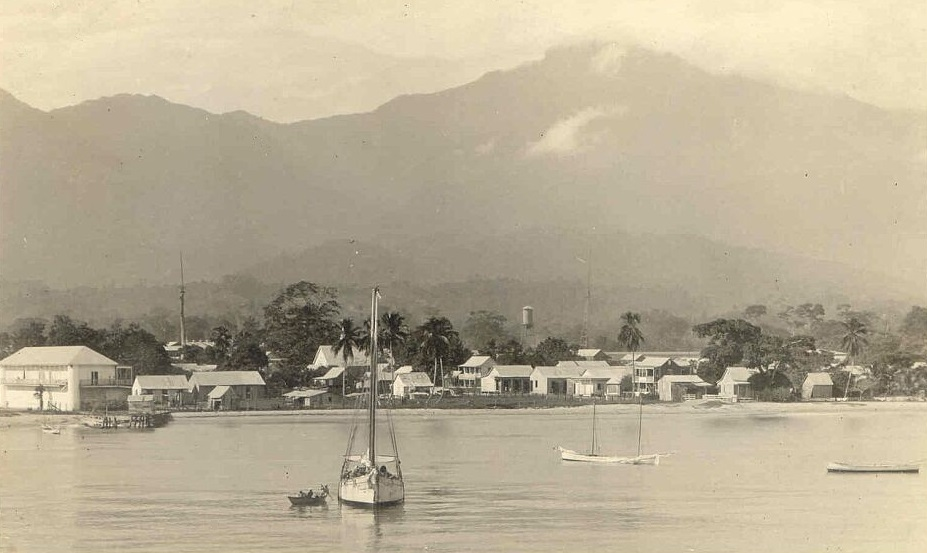
La Ceiba waterfront in the 1910s

In 1872, Manuel Hernández built a small shack under the Ceiba tree that grew near the old docks. Over time, more and more people from present-day Honduras (especially the departments of Olancho and Santa Barbara), and from around the world settled in La Ceiba. Workers were attracted to jobs associated with the banana industry, which became important to the regional economy.

In the late 19th century, the banana business caught the attention of big North American banana companies, such as the Vaccaro Brothers' Standard Fruit Company from New Orleans. This new economic activity attracted national and international immigrantworkers to La Ceiba. The current neighbourhood known as Barrio Inglés was the first recognised neighbourhood in the city. It was so named after the many English-speaking people living in the barrio. At that point the main thoroughfare of La Ceiba was present-day Avenida La Republica, where the train tracks were laid. The rail line was built by the Standard Fruit Company (now Standard Fruit de Honduras, a Dole subsidiary) for transport of its commodity to ships at the port from the banana plantations. This company was largely responsible for the early growth of the city.

La Ceiba was declared a municipality on 23 August 1877. At that time Marco Aurelio Soto was President of Honduras. La Ceiba was the centre of banana and pineapple business, the basis of its economy. Other companies developed in the city, such as:

- Cervecería Hondureña, the national brewing company and holder of the Coca-Cola licence in Honduras. Founded in 1918.
- Fábrica de Manteca y Jabón Atlántida, known as La Blanquita, at one point, this was the largest producer of consumer goods in Honduras; it is now defunct.
- Banco Atlántida, oldest Bank in the country, founded in 1913.
- Mazapan School, the first bilingual school of the nation, the oldest high school and second oldest elementary school in the city.

The first municipal building or city hall was located in the corner of 2da Calle and Avenida Atlántida, at the site of the present-day Ferretería Kawas warehouse. The building was made of wood and in 1903 it was burnt down due to vandalism. Some people wanted to destroy private property ownership records in La Ceiba. The municipal building was set on fire again on 7 March 1914 during more social unrest.

The Municipal Corporation moved the offices further south of the city. They were burned again during unrest in 1924. Soon after this, the office building was constructed at its current location, on land donated by Manuel Mejía.

== Geography ==
=== Climate ===
La Ceiba features a tropical monsoon climate (Köppen Am), with substantial rainfall throughout the course of the year. Due to its northerly aspect, there is a peak between October and February when the trade winds are strongest and extreme orographic rainfalls occur. The average annual rainfall is about 3,200 millimetres (130 in), making it one of the wettest cities in Central America, second only to Colón, Panama among urbanised areas with more than 100,000 people.

Climate data for La Ceiba, Honduras (Golosón International Airport) 1970–1990, extremes 1965–present
Month	Jan	Feb	Mar	Apr	May	Jun	Jul	Aug	Sep	Oct	Nov	Dec	Year
Record high °C (°F)	32.8 (91.0)	34.8 (94.6)	35.4 (95.7)	36.0 (96.8)	38.0 (100.4)	37.0 (98.6)	35.7 (96.3)	38.0 (100.4)	36.0 (96.8)	34.6 (94.3)	33.6 (92.5)	34.0 (93.2)	38.0 (100.4)
Mean daily maximum °C (°F)	27.0 (80.6)	27.6 (81.7)	29.0 (84.2)	30.1 (86.2)	31.3 (88.3)	31.3 (88.3)	30.8 (87.4)	30.9 (87.6)	30.6 (87.1)	29.5 (85.1)	28.2 (82.8)	27.3 (81.1)	29.5 (85.1)
Daily mean °C (°F)	23.8 (74.8)	24.0 (75.2)	25.6 (78.1)	26.8 (80.2)	28.2 (82.8)	28.0 (82.4)	27.5 (81.5)	27.6 (81.7)	27.4 (81.3)	26.2 (79.2)	25.2 (77.4)	24.3 (75.7)	26.2 (79.2)
Mean daily minimum °C (°F)	18.4 (65.1)	18.4 (65.1)	19.5 (67.1)	20.7 (69.3)	22.2 (72.0)	22.6 (72.7)	21.8 (71.2)	21.8 (71.2)	22.0 (71.6)	21.2 (70.2)	20.2 (68.4)	19.1 (66.4)	20.7 (69.3)
Record low °C (°F)	13.2 (55.8)	12.0 (53.6)	11.5 (52.7)	12.0 (53.6)	14.2 (57.6)	19.0 (66.2)	17.5 (63.5)	16.8 (62.2)	18.9 (66.0)	16.7 (62.1)	12.1 (53.8)	12.6 (54.7)	11.5 (52.7)
Average rainfall mm (inches)	90.2 (3.55)	90.0 (3.54)	90.2 (3.55)	40.5 (1.59)	5.9 (0.23)	154.6 (6.09)	174.9 (6.89)	197.3 (7.77)	203.3 (8.00)	423.8 (16.69)	100.6 (3.96)	100.9 (3.97)	1,672.2 (65.83)
Average rainy days (≥ 1.0 mm)	11	8	6	6	2	10	11	13	12	14	13	12	118
Average relative humidity (%)	81	83	82	80	79	80	80	80	78	79	84	80	82
Mean monthly sunshine hours	170.5	192.1	217.0	234.0	213.9	192.0	201.5	217.0	174.0	151.9	144.0	151.9	2,259.8
Mean daily sunshine hours	5.5	6.8	7.0	7.8	6.9	6.4	6.5	7.0	5.8	4.9	4.8	4.9	6.2
Source 1: NOAA
Source 2: Deutscher Wetterdienst (sun and humidity) Meteo Climat (record highs and lows)

== Economy ==
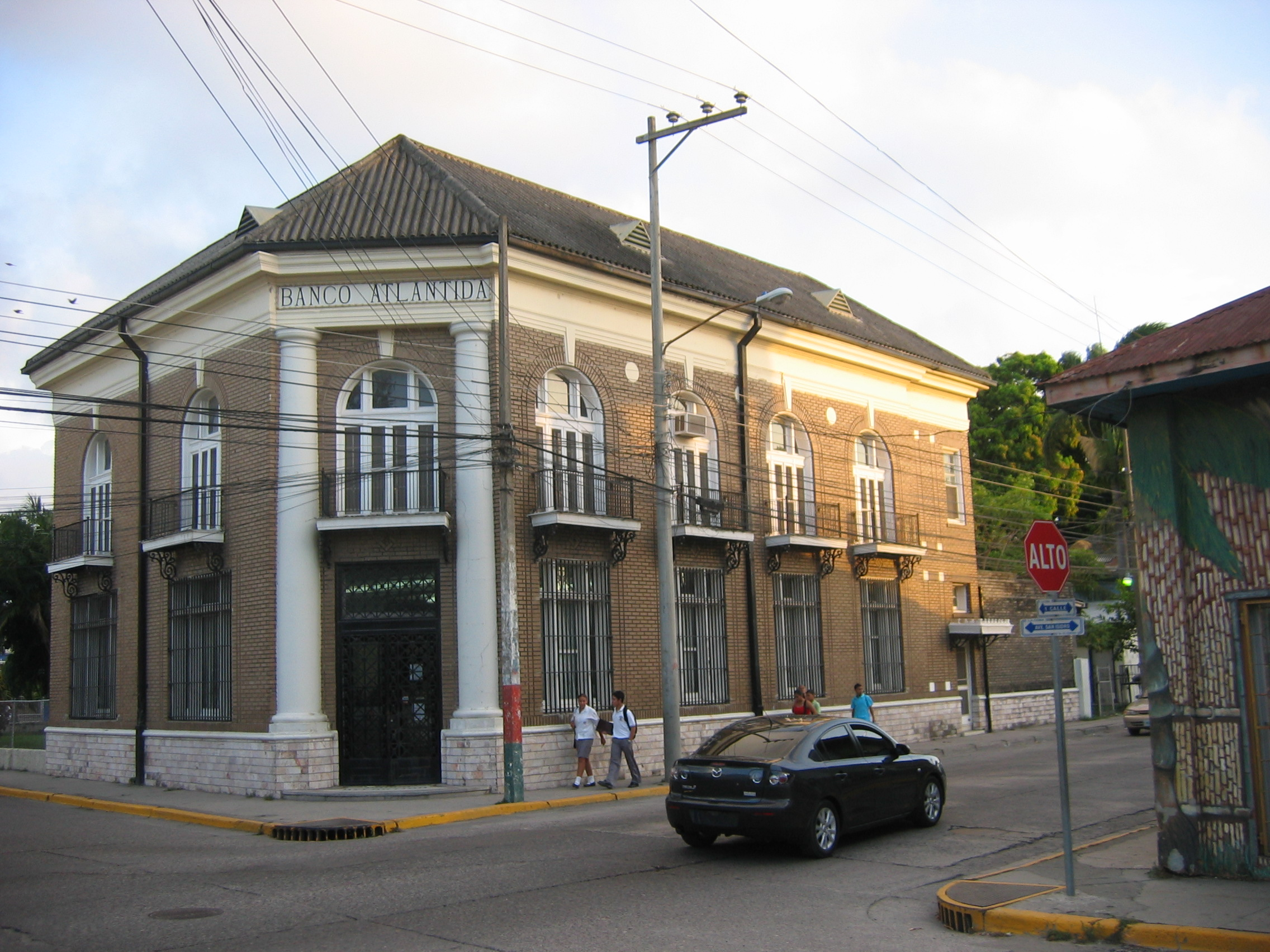
Banco Atlantida on 1era Calle (1st Street)

Among Honduran cities, La Ceiba is the second most important port town after Puerto Cortés. Its economy is made up of mostly commerce and agriculture. Pineapple is the city's major export. Its largest producer is the Standard Fruit Company, a subsidiary of the Dole Food Company, which operates throughout northern Honduras and is based in La Ceiba.

Tourism also plays a large role in the city's economy (see below). Since its development in the late 20th century, the La Ceiba seaport has played an ever-increasing role in the economy of the city. This port represents a vital economic artery to La Ceiba's growing tourist industry. Additionally, the La Ceiba sea port is home to one of the finest boatyards in the north west Caribbean (According to Western Caribbean Cruising Guidebook). Known as the La Ceiba Shipyard, this company offers a complete group of marine services for all types of seagoing vessels.

== Education ==
La Ceiba is home to many public schools. Among the largest is Escuela Francisco Morazán along Avenida San Isidro, which is considered the main street of the city. Instituto Manuel Bonilla is the largest public High School in the city, with over 5,000 registered students.

There are also many private schools in La Ceiba. Several private bilingual education schools offer instruction in both Spanish and English. Most of these offer a Honduran Bachillerato Diploma (equivalent of High school diploma), while Mazapan School offers a US-accredited High School diploma as well. These schools usually offer grades 1 – 11/12, with some offering pre-school education.

The first university in the city was the Centro Universitario Regional del Litoral Atlántico (often called CURLA). It is a Public university run by the larger Universidad Nacional Autonoma de Honduras (UNAH).

The first private university to open in the city was Universidad Tecnológica de Honduras(UTH), which opened in 1995. At the time the college offered only night classes, using the classrooms in a local private high school. In 2002 the college built its own campus. 2002 also marked the opening of the Universidad Católica de Honduras, run by the Catholic church. Additionally, development of a new campus in La Ceiba for the Universidad Tecnológica Centroamericana – UNITEC was begun in 2008.

== Tourism ==
La Ceiba has long been known as the tourism capital of Honduras, due to its proximity to the beach, active night life, and a variety of parks and recreational areas in and around the city. Another factor contributing to the city's tourism is the city port. It provides ferry services to the Bay Islands/Islas de la Bahia in the Caribbean. Ferries from this port also offer daily service to the main islands of Útila and Roatán.

The area around La Ceiba has many parks and natural reserves. Its most recognised natural area is the Pico Bonito (Beautiful Peak) National park. This park's most recognised feature, Pico Bonito on the Nombre de Dios mountain range, is 2435 meters high and provides a back drop for the city. The Cangrejal River, popular for its Class III-IV river rafting, borders the eastern edge of the city and the Cuero and Salado Wildlife refuges with its wild manatees is located a few miles to the west of the city.

Semana Santa (Holy Week) is one of the city's busiest tourist seasons. During this week tourists from all over the country flock to the city to enjoy its sun, beach, and very active night life during that week during Carnaval before Ash Wednesday.

The busiest tourist season by far is the week leading up to the internationally renowned "Gran Carnaval Internacional de La Ceiba" which is a citywide celebration in honour of the city's patron saint, St. Isidore (San Isidro). During the week leading up to the third Saturday in May, many neighborhoods have smaller celebrations in one or a couple of their streets. On Saturday afternoon the big parade with elaborate floats takes place along Avenida San Isidro, the city's main thoroughfare. After the parade, the locals and tourists all have a celebration along that same road, where stands sell food, beer, drinks, and souvenirs.

== Transportation ==
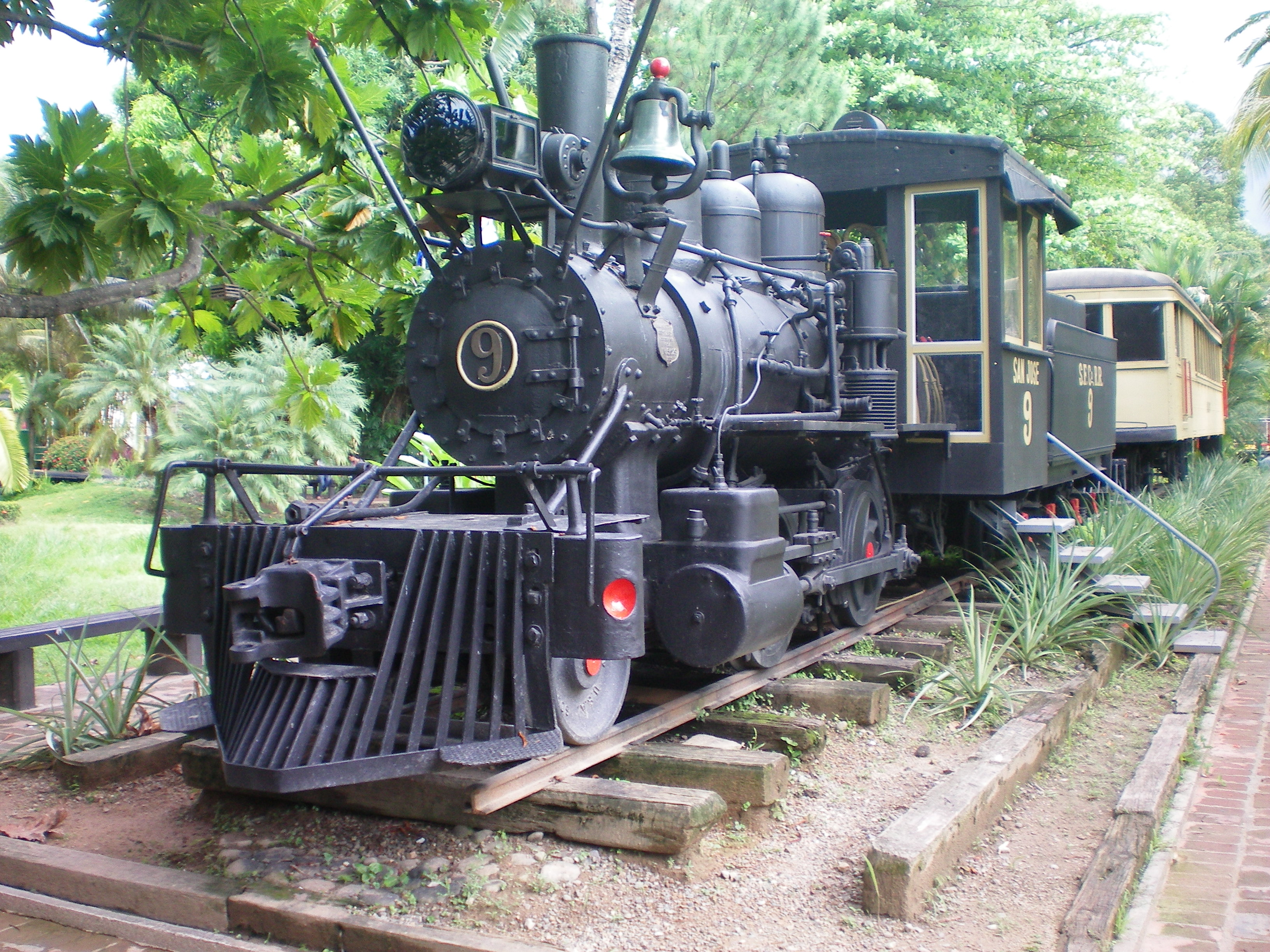
Old steam train from La Ceiba, now in Swinford park

Danto Bridge on the western approach to the city

There were trains running through La Ceiba to bring the bananas from the plantations but they are not active any longer although traces of the old railroad tracks can still be seen.

Buses and taxis make up most of the public transportation in the city, with numerous buses serving almost every available route in the city. Taxi-cabs are numerous in the city, costing as little as L.30.00 (just over $1.20 as of 2023) for destinations within sectors of the city limits. From one sector to the next, the cost is an additional 10 Lempira ($.40)

The pier to the east of the city offers transportation via ferry to 2 of the 3 major islands that make up Islas de la Bahia; Roatan and Utila. The Golosón International Airport to the west of town offers flights to the other major cities in the country as well as other towns in the Mosquitia Region of Honduras in the east. This airport is hub to Aerolíneas Sosa. There is also a bus station just west of the city centre though some buses also run from their own terminals.

== Sport ==
La Ceiba is the home of two clubs of the top division of the Honduran National Professional Football League, Vida and Victoria. Both play in Nilmo Edwards Stadium. The matches between the two rival clubs are known as Clásico Ceibeño. C.D.Real Mallorca also play their home games in La Ceiba.

== Notable people ==
- Guillermo Anderson – musician and recording artist, recipient of the Honduras La Orden Laurel de Oro
- José Azcona del Hoyo – former President of Honduras from 1986 to 1990
- Marvin Chávez – professional footballer for the San Jose Earthquakes in Major League Soccer
- Víctor Bernárdez – professional footballer for the San Jose Earthquakes in Major League Soccer
- Dunia Elvir – television journalist and producer
- David Meza – former radio journalist
- Jerry Palacios – professional footballer for Marathón in the Liga Nacional de Fútbol de Honduras
- Johnny Palacios – professional footballer for Olimpia in the Liga Nacional de Fútbol de Honduras
- Milton Palacios – professional footballer for Victoria in the Liga Nacional de Fútbol de Honduras
- Wilson Palacios – professional footballer for Stoke City in the Premier League
- Arnold Peralta – former professional footballer who last played for Olimpia in the Liga Nacional de Fútbol de Honduras
- Williams Reyes – professional footballer for FAS in the Salvadoran Primera División
- Hendry Thomas – professional footballer for Wigan Athletic in the Premier League
- Carlos Urbizo – economist, politician
- Steve Van Buren – former National Football League player and member of the Pro Football Hall of Fame
- Alfredo 'Dr. Sebi' Bowman – Natural healer, Health & Wellness lecturer, Founder of USHA Village, La Ceiba, Honduras

== Twin towns – sister cities ==
- Broken Arrow, United States
- Cali, Colombia
- San Cristóbal, Venezuela
- Santa Ana, El Salvador
- Tela, Honduras

== In fiction ==
- In Paul Theroux's novel The Mosquito Coast, Allie Fox, disillusioned with America's materialistic culture, abandons his native country and emigrates with his family to Honduras, initially disembarking at the city of La Ceiba before making his way inland with a vision of starting a new life.

== See also ==
- Corozal, Honduras
- Puerto Cortes, Honduras
- Trujillo, Honduras
