= Chepo (footballer) =

Honduran footballer

Personal information
- Full name: José Alberto Fernandez
- Date of birth: November 29, 1970 (age 55)
- Place of birth: Corozal, Honduras
- Height: 1.70 m (5 ft 7 in)
- Position: Right-back

Senior career*
Years	Team	Apps	(Gls)
1991–1995	Olimpia		
1996	Federal		
1996–1998	Olimpia		
1999	Sport Recife	5	(1)
1999–2000	Olimpia		
2002	Vida		

International career^{‡}
1993–1999	Honduras		
- * Club domestic league appearances and goals as of 2016 ‡ National team caps and goals as of 21 December 2016

José Alberto Fernandez nicknamed El Chepo (born April 28, 1972) is a retired Honduran footballer.
