= La Ceiba Carnival =

Annual event in La Ceiba, Honduras

The La Ceiba Carnival (Gran Carnaval Internacional de La Ceiba) is an annual celebration in La Ceiba, Honduras held every third or fourth Saturday of May. The event is in held in honor of Saint Isidore the Laborer, the patron saint of the city. The celebration starts at least one week before the main event, which is a big parade followed by an all-night party along Avenida San Isidro, La Ceiba’s main thoroughfare.

== History ==
In 1917, La Ceiba held its first fair known as “Feria la Isidra” in honor of its patron saint. It was during the event that the city picked the “Reina de la Feria” (Queen of the Fair). In 1968, it was decided that there would be a parade in honor of the Queen of the fair. The parade was held on May 25 with only 5 floats which were sponsored by local businesses. By 1972, over 15 floats were in the parade. In 1976, the first “carnavalito” was held in Barrio Mejia, a local neighborhood. Many neighborhoods were offered the chance to have one of these small carnivals and parades, but Barrio Mejia was the only one that accepted. Seeing that this carnavalito was a success, other neighborhoods followed in years later.

== The current Carnival ==
Nowadays the festivities start with the crowning of the queen, 2 weeks before the parade. Then a small procession with many of the local high schools takes place. The official St. Isidore feast day is on May 15 and it’s a local public holiday.

The week before the parade, from Monday to Friday, many neighborhoods and plazas have their own little carnivals. The neighborhoods and Plazas that have or still participate with their own small carnival are:

- Barrio La Isla
- Barrio Ingles
- Barrio Mejia
- Barrio El Iman
- Colonia El Sauce
- Barrio Solares Nuevos
- Mall Mega Plaza
- Plaza Premiere

The Saturday after the last little carnival during the afternoon the parade starts usually in the south end of Avenida San Isidro and runs along the entire road and ends at the beach. After the parade, thousands of people remain on the street where many people sell food, drink and souvenirs all night. The event is regarded as the largest in Central America, bringing over 500,000 tourists in 2008 alone (number provided by the Unidad Turistica Municipal, which is the office that is in charge of the carnival)
