= Maurício Pantera =

Brazilian footballer

Personal information
- Full name: Maurício Leandrino da Silva Filho
- Date of birth: 3 June 1975 (age 51)
- Place of birth: Recife, Brazil
- Height: 1.75 m (5 ft 9 in)
- Position: Forward

Youth career
- Santa Cruz

Senior career*
Years	Team	Apps	(Gls)
1996	Santa Cruz		
1997–2001	SD Compostela	61	(11)
1997	→ Grêmio (loan)	16	(7)
1997–1998	→ Sport Recife (loan)		
2001	→ ABC (loan)		
2002–2003	Al Jazira		
2003	ABC		
2004	Ferroviário		
2004	Anapolina		
2005	Parnahyba		
2005	Barras		
2005	Icasa		
2005	Ferroviário		
2006	Ríver		
2007	Potiguar de Mossoró		
2007	Treze		
2007	Ríver		
2007	Santa Quitéria		
2008	Ríver		
2008	Sampaio Corrêa		
2008	Barras		
2008	Upanema		
2009	Baraúnas		
2009	Ríver		
2009	Alecrim		
2010	América-RN		
2010	Ríver		
2010	Botafogo-PB		
2011	Atlético de Alagoinhas		
2011	Ypiranga-BA		
2011	Uruburetama		
2012	Vitória da Conquista		
2013	Santa Cruz (SC)		
2013	Atlético Potengi		
2014	Santa Cruz (SC)		
- * Club domestic league appearances and goals as of 5 January 2024

Maurício Leandrino da Silva Filho (born 3 June 1975), also known as Maurício, Maurício Leandrino or Maurício Pantera, is a Brazilian former professional footballer who played as a forward.

== Career ==
Maurício started his career at Santa Cruz-PE, in 1996, after standing out in the Copa São Paulo de Futebol Jr. In his first year as a professional he was top scorer in Série B B with 13 goals. His good performances took him to the Spanish club SD Compostela. He was sold for R$1.3 million, to this day it is the second biggest deal made by Santa Cruz, behind only striker Gilberto, who was sold to SC Internacional, in 2011, for R$2 million. He debuted in La Liga on 11 October 1996, a match marked by a historic goal from Ronaldo.

He played for a few seasons for SD Compostela, but had difficulties adapting to the climate, being loaned. From then on, the cycle of clubs he defended was enormous, having passed through Grêmio, Sport, Ferroviário-CE, Baraúnas-RN, ABC-RN, Treze-PB, Barras-PI, River-PI, Al Jazira, among others.

== Personal life ==
After retiring, he works as a property security guard and doorman in Recife. Maurício also have a brother (Marcos Pantera) who was also a professional football player.

== Honours ==
Grêmio

- Copa do Brasil: 1997

Sport

- Campeonato Pernambucano: 1998

Individual

- 1996 Campeonato Brasileiro Série B top scorer: 13 goals
