= Jorge Ramos (Brazilian footballer) =

Brazilian footballer (born 1978)

Personal information
- Full name: Jorge Teixeira Ramos
- Date of birth: 15 August 1978 (age 48)
- Place of birth: Montes Claros, Brazil
- Position: Forward

Senior career*
Years	Team	Apps	(Gls)
1998	Porto-PE		
1998–1999	Chaves	8	(1)
1999–2000	Sport Recife	?	(1)
2000	→ Íbis (loan)		
2001	Gama	7	(1)
2003	Lagartense		
- América de Natal
- Rio Negro-AM
- Cabofriense
2007	Ferroviário do Recife		
2008	Petrolina		

Managerial career
- 2014: Náutico-RR U20
- 2015: Altinho U20
- * Club domestic league appearances and goals

Jorge Teixeira Ramos (born 15 August 1978), known as Jorge Ramos, is a Brazilian retired footballer who played as a forward.

== Career ==
Born in Montes Claros, Minas Gerais, Ramos moved to Portugal with G.D. Chaves, after playing for Porto-PE, and scored once for the club in eight appearances. After returning to Brazil in 1999, he joined Sport Recife, but was loaned to Íbis for the 2000 campaign after featuring rarely.

Ramos represented Gama in 2001, He subsequently represented Lagartense, América de Natal, Rio Negro-AM, Cabofriense, Ferroviário do Recife and Petrolina before retiring in 2008.

In September 2014, Ramos was named manager of Náutico-RR's under-20 squad. He left the club in December to take over the same category of Altinho.

== Personal life ==
Ramos' son Kaio Jorge is also a footballer and a forward. He was groomed at Santos.
