= Corozal Sugar Factory =

Factory in Belize

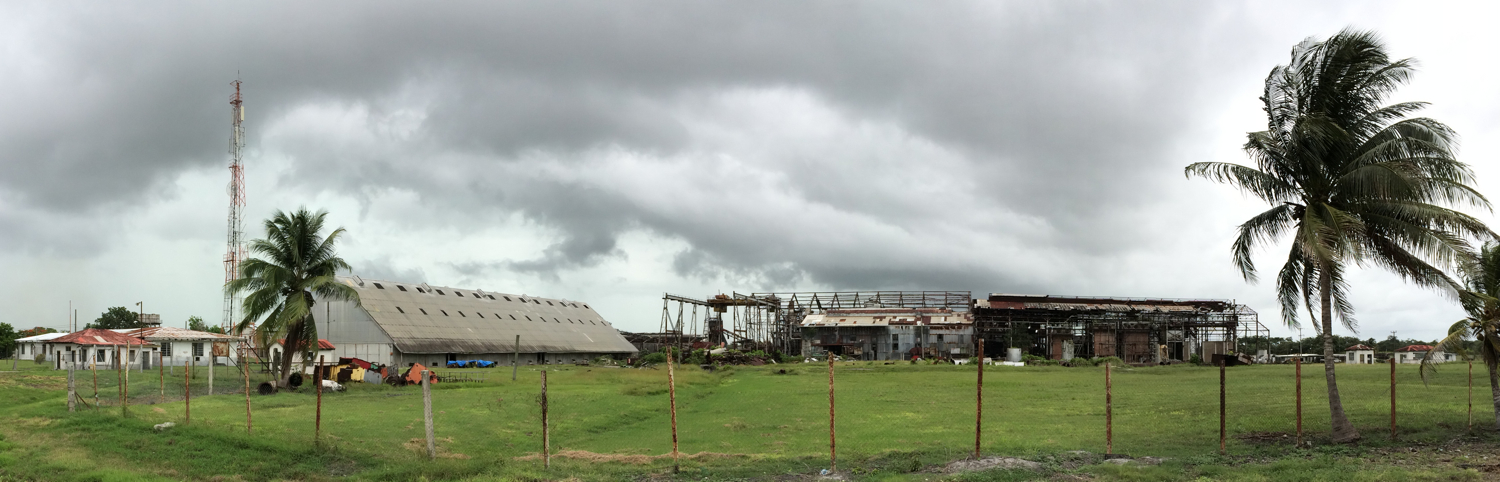
The Corozal Sugar Factory in Libertad, Belize (2015)

The Corozal Sugar Factory began operating in 1937 in Pembroke Hall, Belize (present day Libertad). Today the factory is abandoned, but delayed plans to repair it and add a new distillery for ethanol production have been underway since 2007.

== History ==
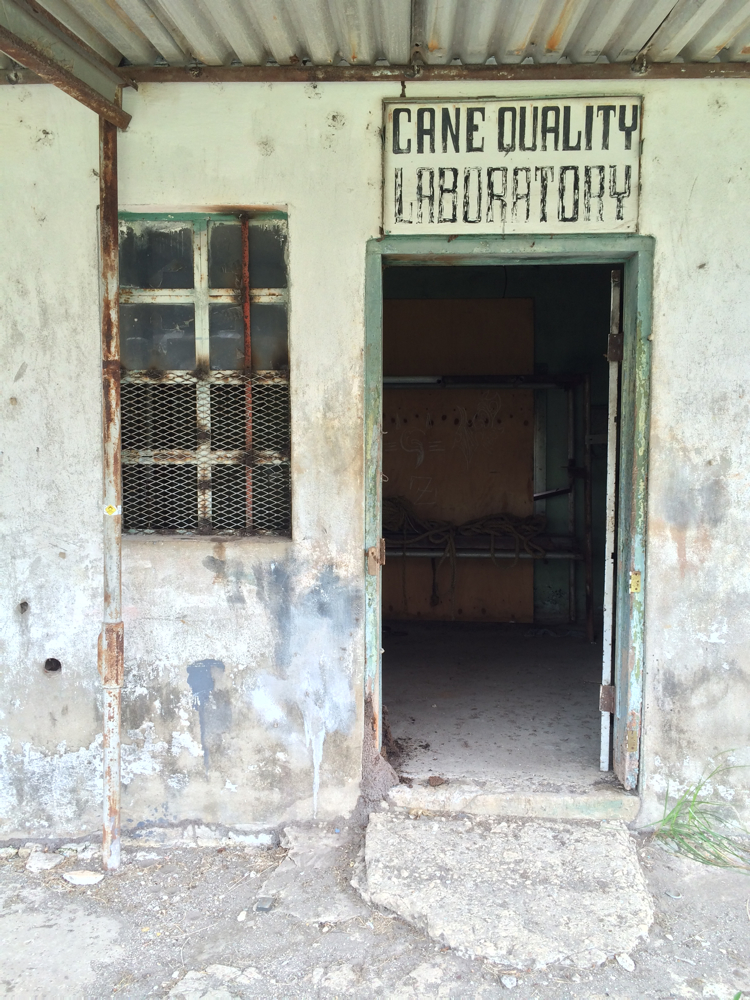
Cane Quality Laboratory

Sugar production in Belize grew in the mid-1800s as Yucatán immigrants fled the Caste War and began cultivating sugarcane in British Honduras. British interest in exporting sugar led to the development of large plantations in the Corozal and Orange Walk regions. Sugar production peaked in the 1880s with 2.5 million pounds being exported, then decreasing to 200,000 pounds by the 1890s. With declining colonial sugar exports worrying the British government, the Corozal Sugar Factory was built in Pembroke Hall by Henry Melhado & Sons and marked the beginning of the country's modern sugar industry in 1937. However, factory output was stunted and it took 16 years to hit the goal of exporting 2,500 tons of sugar. The following year in 1954, the factory was fully operational and 7,357 tons of sugar were exported; a little over half the output of the 122 small producers in nearby villages. 25% of these small producers worked in San Narciso, 5 miles west of the Corozal Sugar Factory.

In 1967, British corporation Tate & Lyle purchased the factory, expanded it, and opened a second factory in Tower Hill near Orange Walk. With these investments, sugarcane became a booming industry for Belize and the standard of living in the Corozal and Orange Walk region improved.

A 1975 Tate & Lyle 'Annual Visit' document reveals some of the challenges the plant faced in maintaining high production at the peak of world sugar prices in the 1970s:

- An additional sugarcane grab was ordered to move and bundle the cane within the factory. The 1 hydraulically operated grab couldn't keep up with the number of trucks arriving each day to deliver sugarcane.
- Export sugar quality incurred substantial penalties for failing to meet American refiners' quality standards. Moisture, Color, Ash, and Grain Size penalties totaled £9,050 in 1973(41,650 tons shipped) and £28,000 in 1974(46,200 tons shipped). The plant consultants, J.D. Blanchard and R.R. Trott, suggested handling the sugar in barges and sometimes storing it in Belize City contributed to the low quality.

== Sugar prices and closing ==
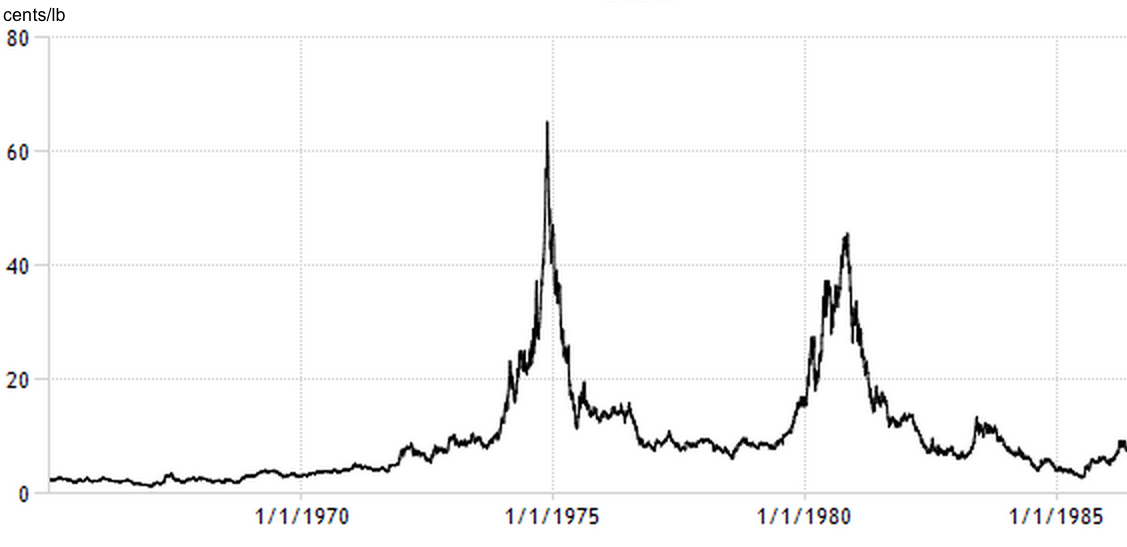
Historic Sugar Prices

A substantial increase in world sugar prices in the 1970s was followed by a slump in the 1980s. These unstable sugar prices can be attributed to several factors:

- A decline of sugar consumption in developed countries (notably the United States, Canada, and Japan) and increase of consumption in developing countries.
- The United States protecting domestic producers by setting internal sugar prices. Japan also levied high duties and taxes on imported sugar.
- The criticism of sugar and emergence of sugar alternatives such as High Fructose Corn Syrup in the 1970s (cereals even removed the word "sugar" from their titles).

Depressed sugar prices led Tate & Lyle to close the Corozal Sugar Factory in 1985 and divest 90% of its interest in the Tower Hill factory to employees.

== Reopening ==
In 1989, the factory was leased to Jamaican petroleum company, Petrojam, and reopened for the production of molasses. The molasses was then exported to Jamaica where it was refined into ethanol. Through the Caribbean Basin Initiative, this ethanol was sold to the United States duty-free.

The factory was closed again in 1997.

== Today ==
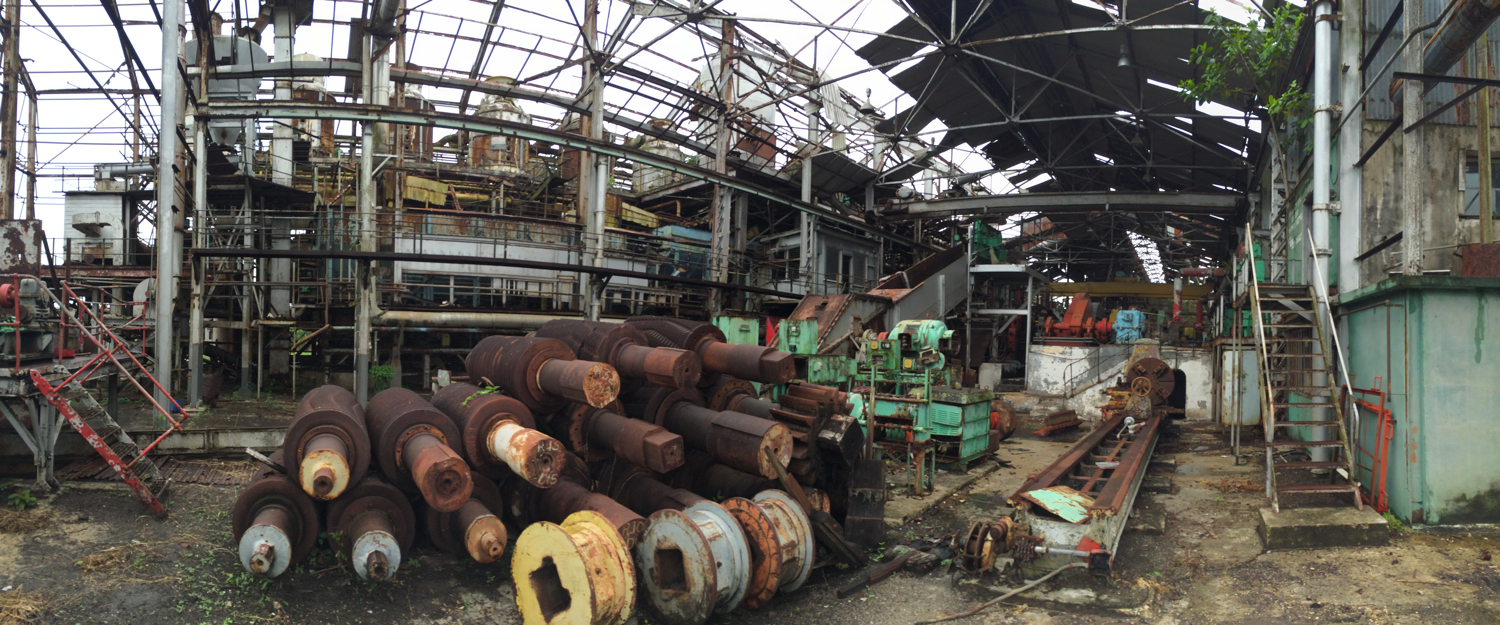
Inside the factory (2015)

Today, all sugarcane in northern Belize is processed at the Tower Hill factory owned by Belize Sugar Industries (BSI) in Orange Walk.

Plans to reopen the Corozal Sugar Factory have been delayed. In 2007, the largest ethanol producer in Mexico and a Panama company created a joint venture, Destill Belize Ethanol, to reopen the factory and produce ethanol. The factory remains abandoned with a few large ethanol tanks in use adjacent to the main building.

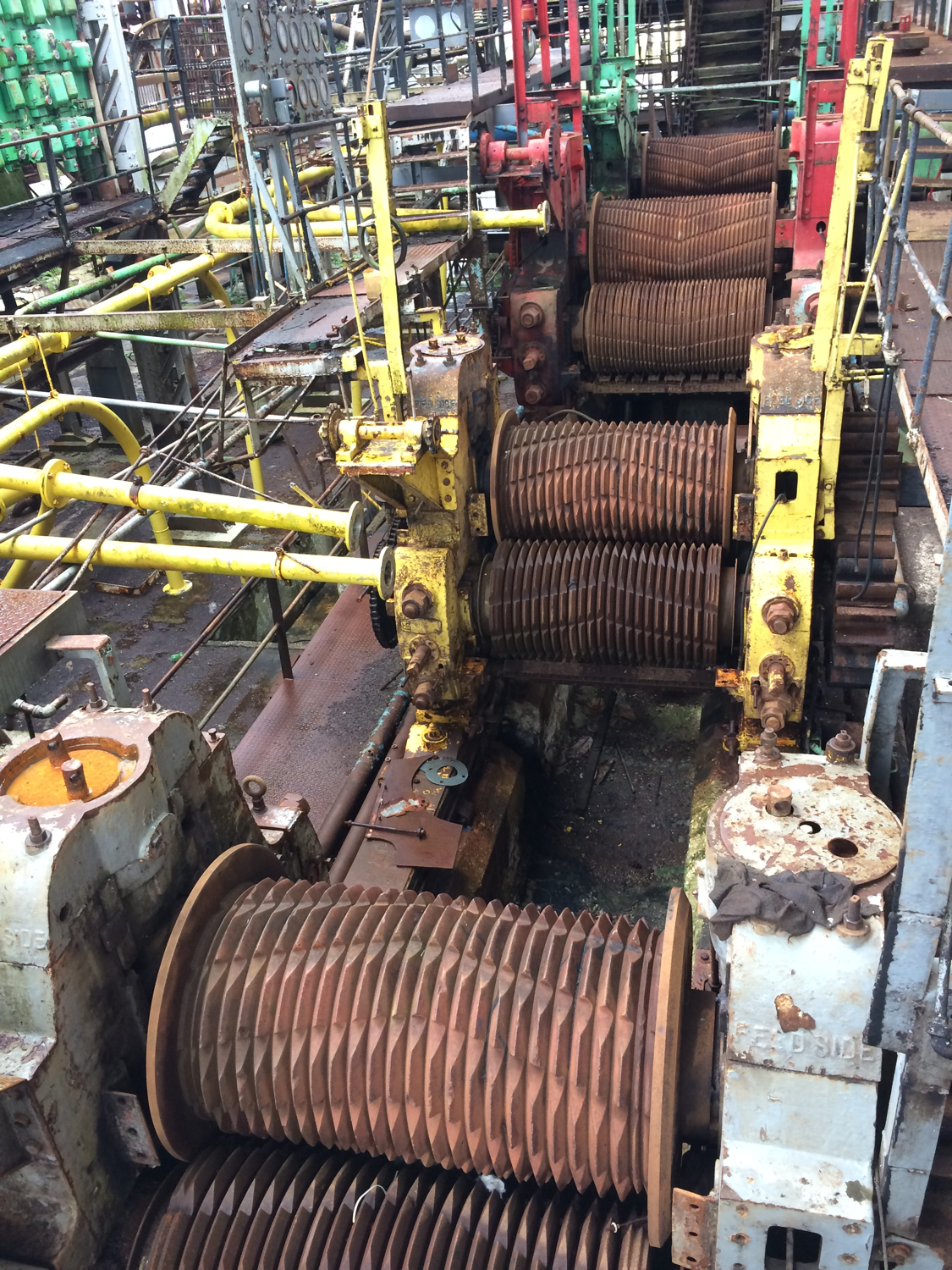

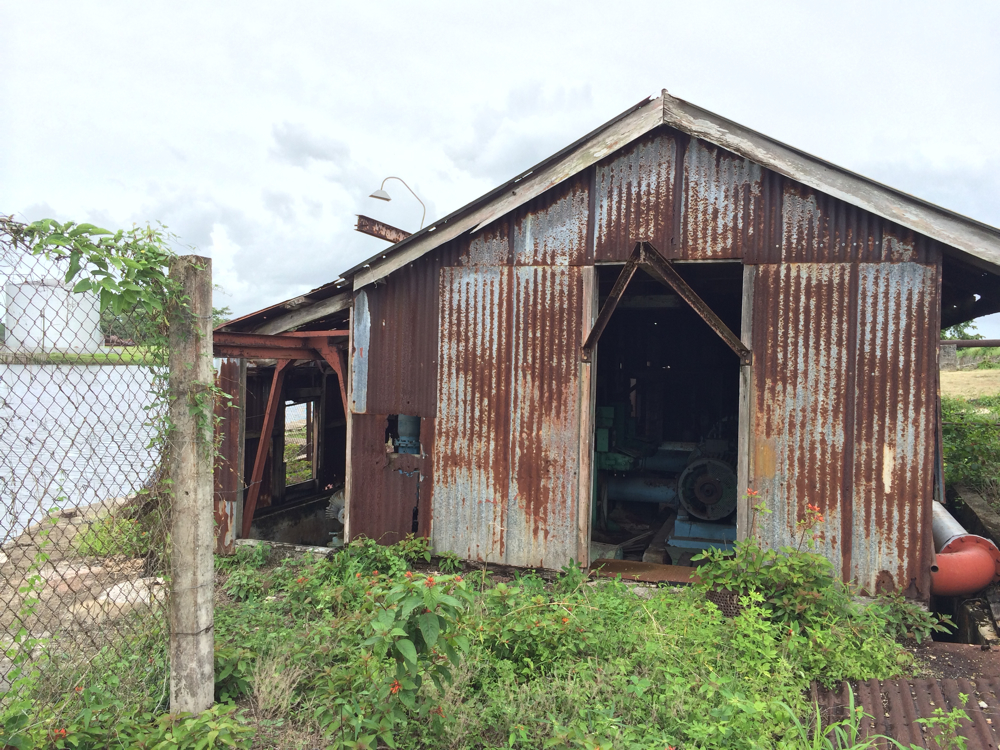
Water Pump House on the River

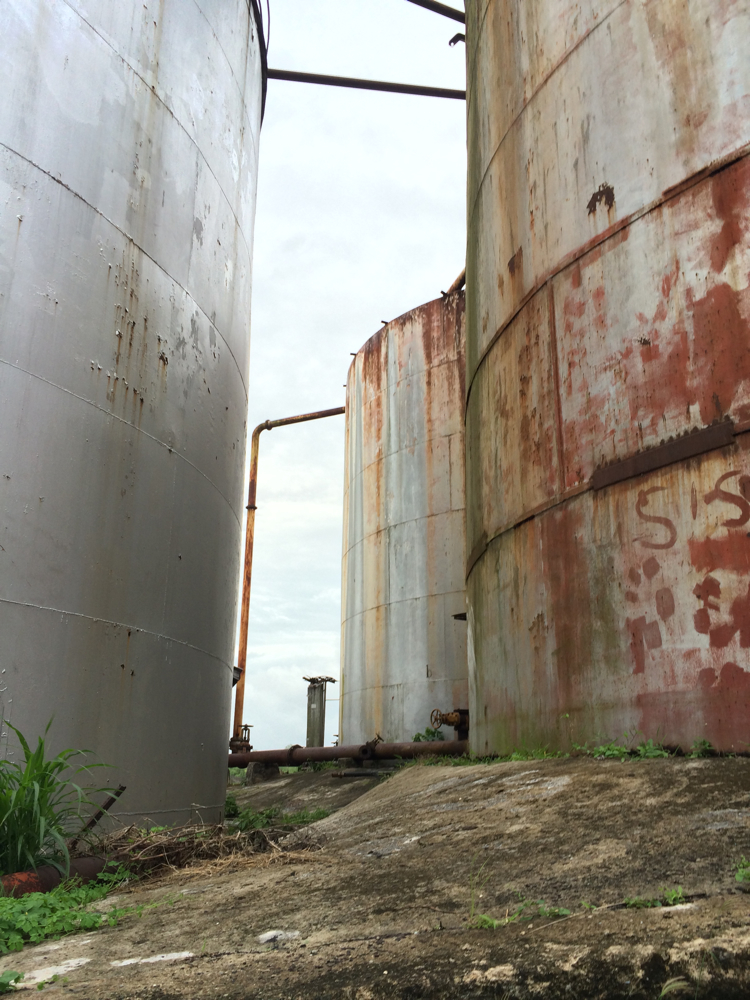
Ethanol Tanks

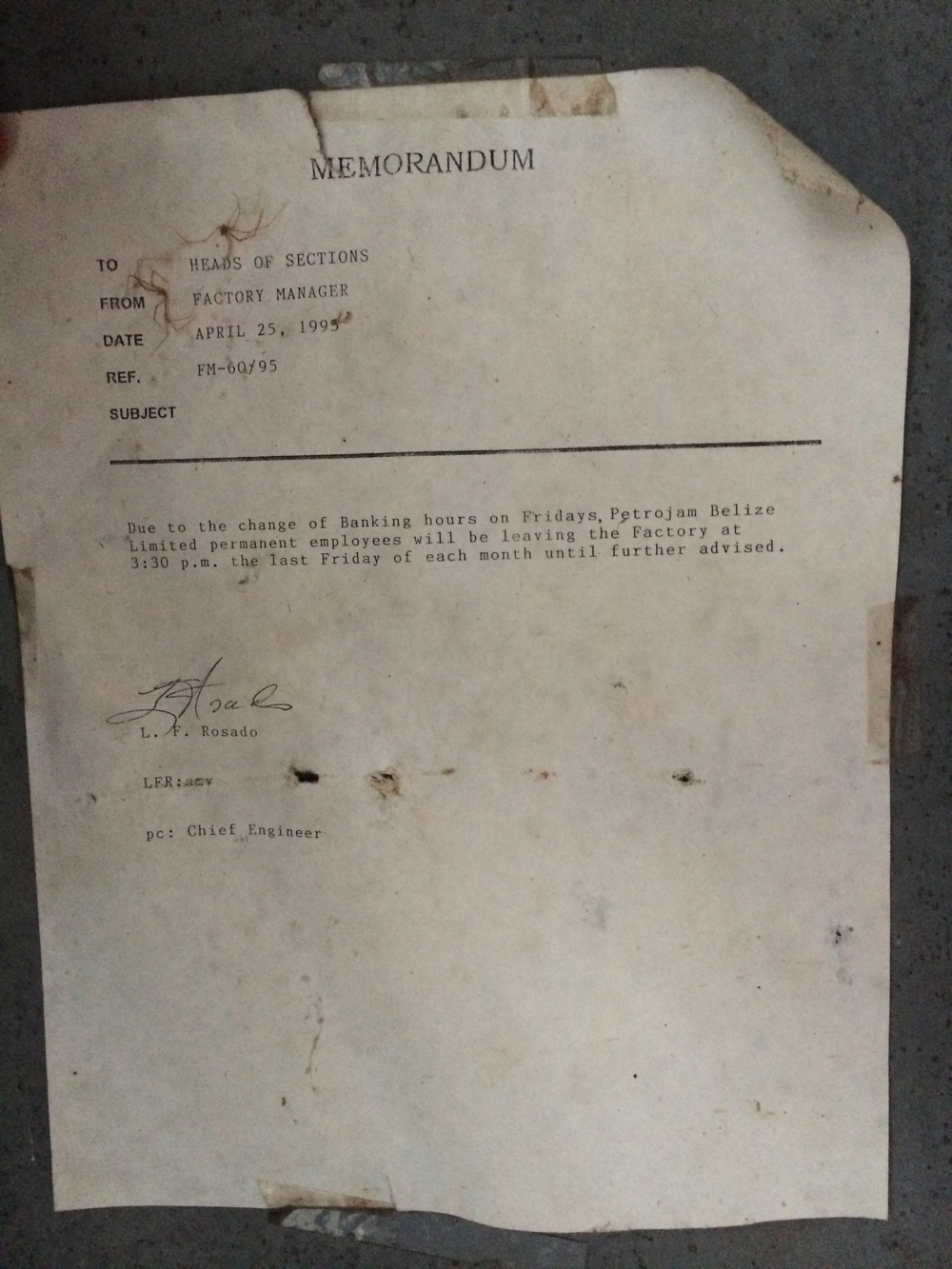

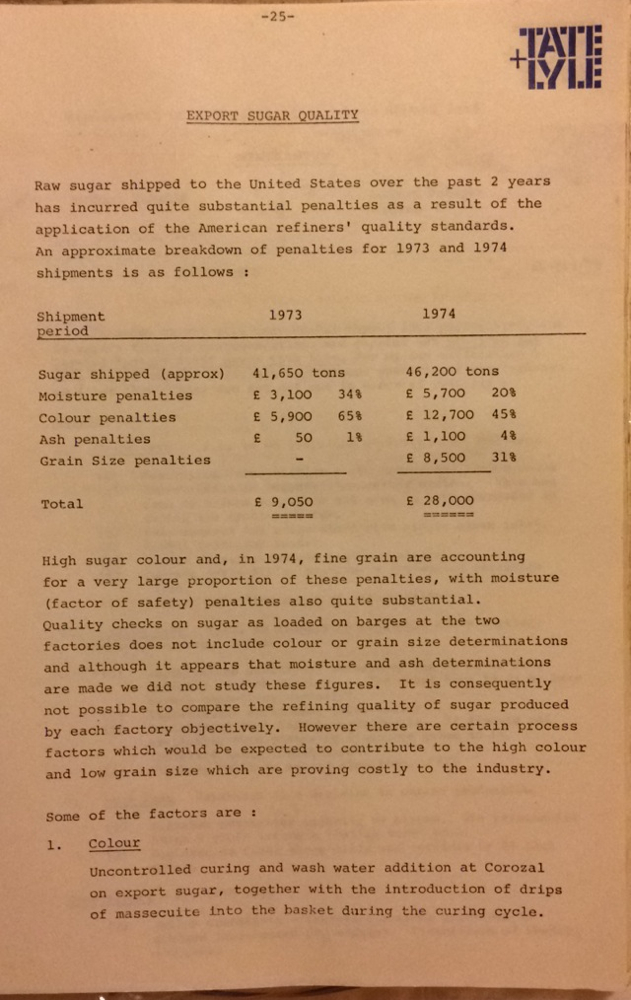
Export Quality page from 1975 Annual Visit

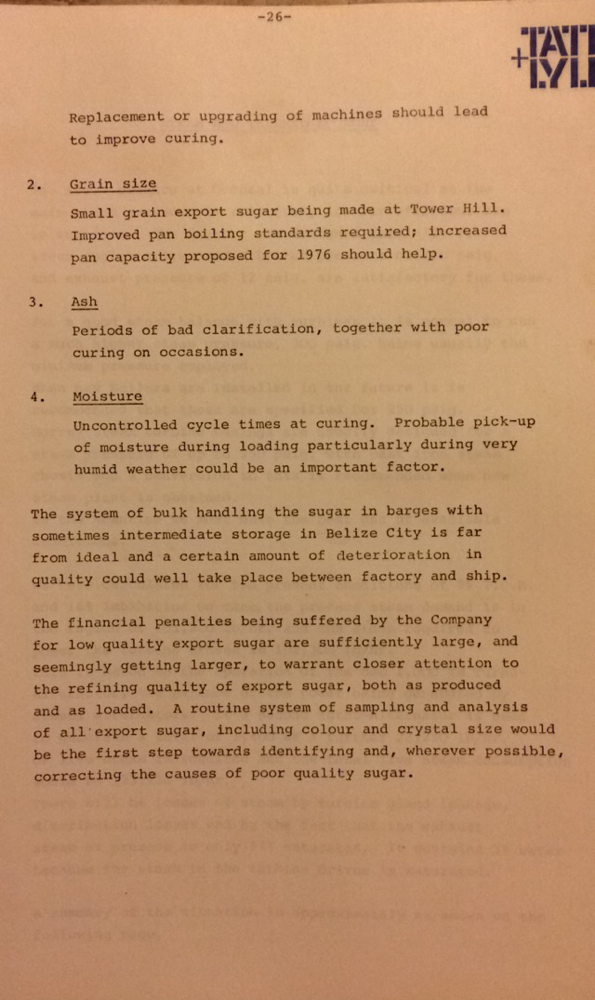
Export Quality page from 1975 Annual Visit
