= Corozal (dredger) =

Construction ship b. 1911 for Panama canal

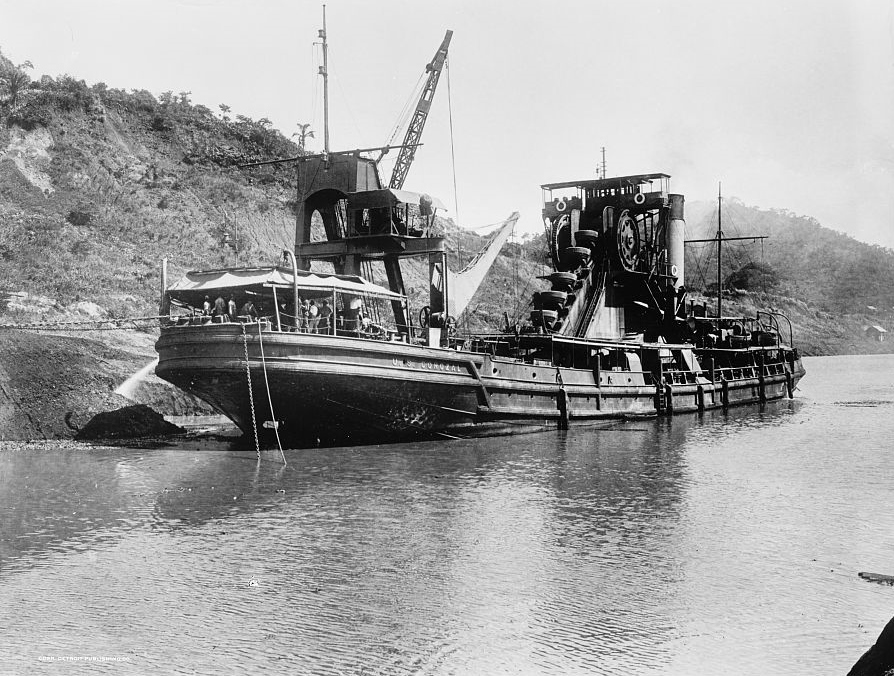
- Corozal at work on the Panama Canal

History
- Name: Corozal
- Owner: US Government
- Port of registry: United States (no. ON226006)
- Ordered: 1911
- Builder: Messrs. Wm. Simons & Company London Works, Renfrew
- Laid down: 1911
- Launched: 12 November 1911
- Fate: Sold 1926

History
- Name: Corozal
- Owner: Arundel Corporation
- Acquired: 1926
- Fate: Broken up November 1956

General characteristics
- Type: Bucket-ladder dredger
- Tonnage: 1,684 GRT
- Length: 261.1 ft (79.6 m)
- Beam: 45.2 ft (13.8 m)
- Propulsion: 2 × triple-expansion, surface-condensing engines
- Speed: 11 knots (20 km/h; 13 mph)
- Capacity: 1,200 long tons (1,200 t) of dredgings

Corozal was a Scottish-built dredger used on the Panama Canal. The Renfrew-based firm of Messrs. Wm. Simons & Company won a US government tender for its construction in 1911. The vessel was launched in November 1911 and taken into US government service as the US Corozal. It was the most powerful dredger ever built at that time. The Corozal operated on the difficult Culebra Cut, deepening a channel excavated by hand and dynamite. It became the first ship to sail through the cut in December 1913, shortly before the canal opened to traffic. The Corozal was sold to the Arundel Corporation in 1926 and scrapped in 1956.

== Construction ==
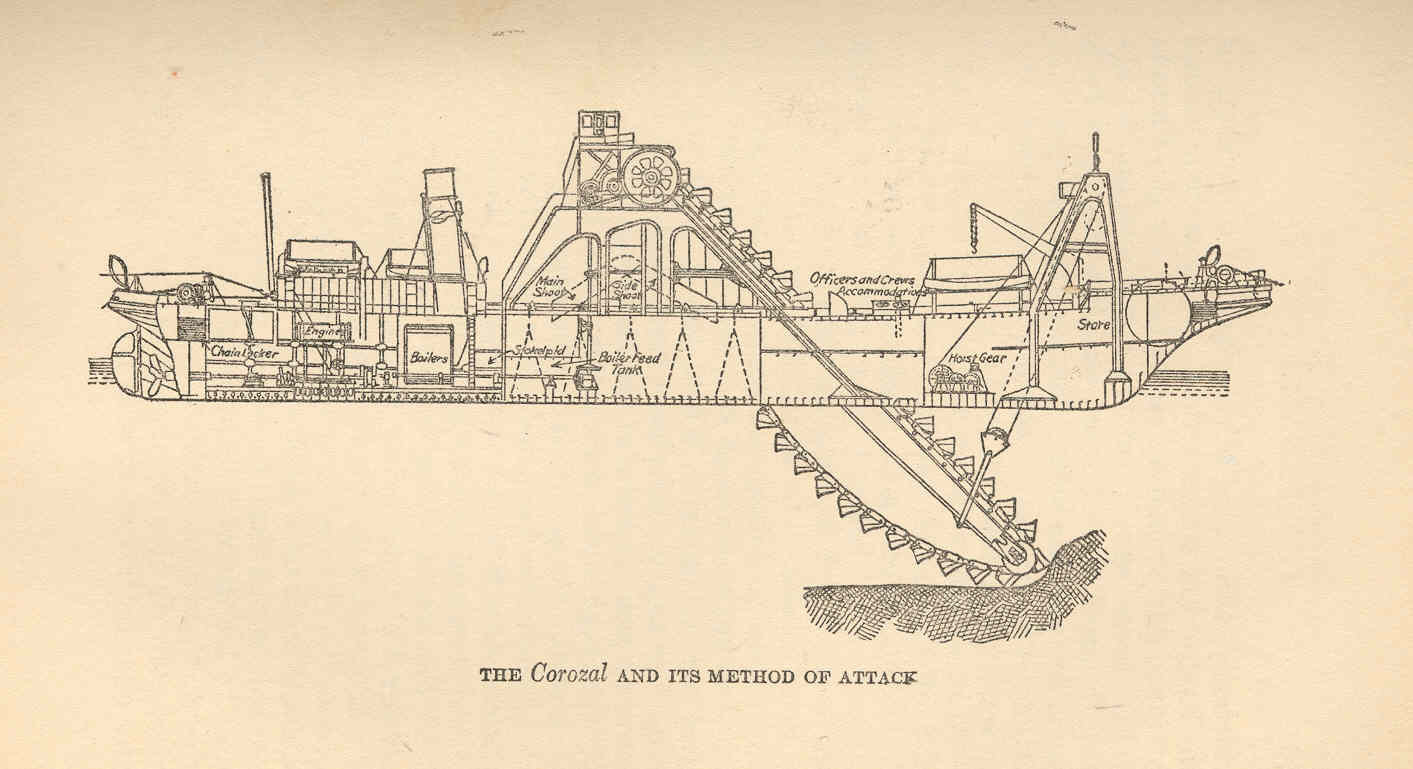
1913 drawing of its internal construction and method of operation

The United States government took over construction of the Panama Canal from a French company in 1904. In 1911 bids were invited for the construction of a dredger, which would become the US Corozal. The Scottish firms Messrs. Wm. Simons & Company won the tender with a bid less than half that of their San Francisco-based competitor. The Corozal was built at Simons' London Works in Renfrew in the west Central Lowlands.

The Corozal was a bucket ladder dredger with a capacity of 1,200 long tons (1,200 t) of dredgings and 1,684 gross register tonnage. She measured 261.1 feet (79.6 m) in length and 45.2 feet (13.8 m) in width. The vessel was propelled by 2 sets of triple-expansion, surface-condensing steam engines supplied from two cylindrical boilers and was capable of 11 knots. The Corozal also had two auxiliary 2-cylinder engines which operated manoeuvring winches at the bow and stern.

Corozal's bucket ladder could reach depths of up to 50 feet (15 m) and could be raised or lowered at a rate of 10 feet (3 m) per minute. It could use two different sets of buckets: ones of 54 cubic feet (1.5 m^{3}) capacity for soft material and ones of 35 cubic feet (1 m^{3}) for stiff clay. The bucket chain could move at three different speeds to suit different strengths of material. Each bucket could carry several tonnes, there were 50 buckets on each chain. The entire chain arrangement weighed 240 long tons (240 t). The dredgings could be loaded into an internal hopper or sent by chute into a barge alongside. At the time of her construction she was the most powerful dredger ever built.

The Corozal was launched on 12 November 1911. She was registered in the United States under the number ON226006. The vessel was tested by dredging sand and mud off Gareloch and stiffer material in the Musgrave Channel, Belfast, before sailing to Panama.

The master of The Corozal was James B. Wallace, an employee of Messrs. Wm. Simons & Company.

== Panama Canal ==
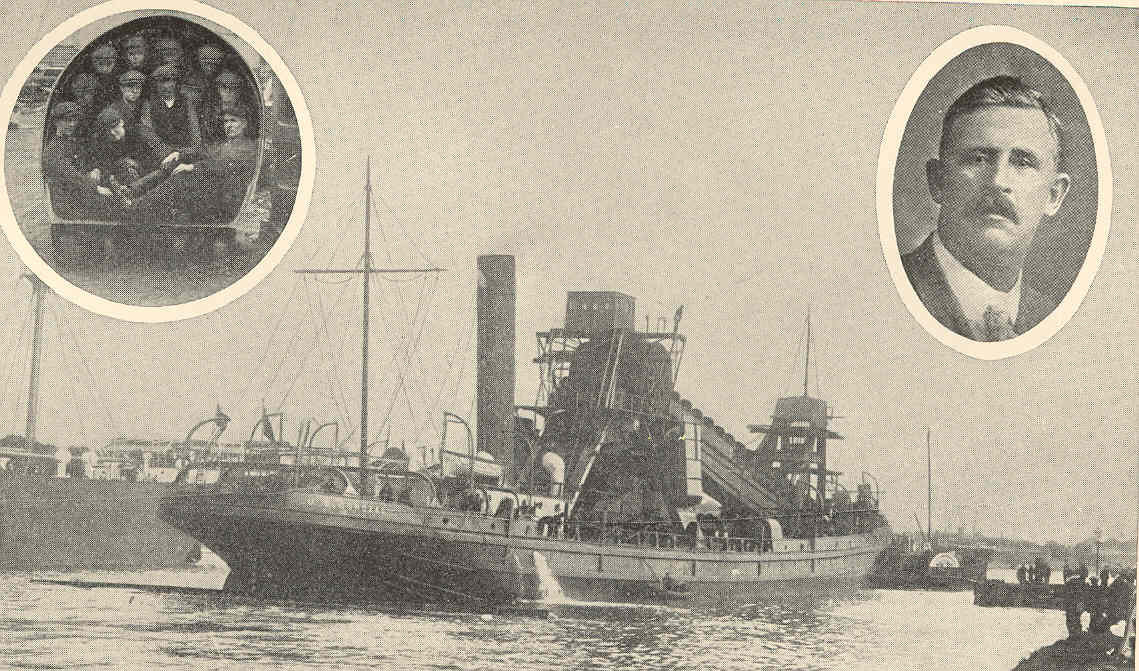
1913 postcard showing the Corozal, men inside one of its buckets and the engineer W. G. Comber

In Panama Corozal worked on the Culebra Cut, one of the most difficult parts of the canal to excavate due to frequent mudslides. Once the cut had been excavated manually by workers and then with dynamite, it was flooded and deepened by dredging. The Corozal was one of around 34 dredging vessels used during the canal's construction. Although the cut was completed by May 1913 it had been blocked by a mudslide at Cucaracha and the Corozal was one of the dredgers used to clear this final obstacle. In December 1913 she became the first ship to sail through the Culebra Cut, which was the last part of the canal to be dug. The canal opened in 1914. During its time on the canal the Corozal excavated 4,000,000 cubic yards (3,100,000 m^{3}) of material.

== Later service ==
The US government sold the Corozal to the Arundel Corporation of Philadelphia and Baltimore in 1926. She was broken up at Jacksonville in November 1956.

A model of the vessel, dating from the time of its construction, is in the collection of the Paisley Museum. It was featured prominently in an exhibition when the museum opened in new premises in 2023.
