= Wilson Gottardo =

Brazilian football coach and former player

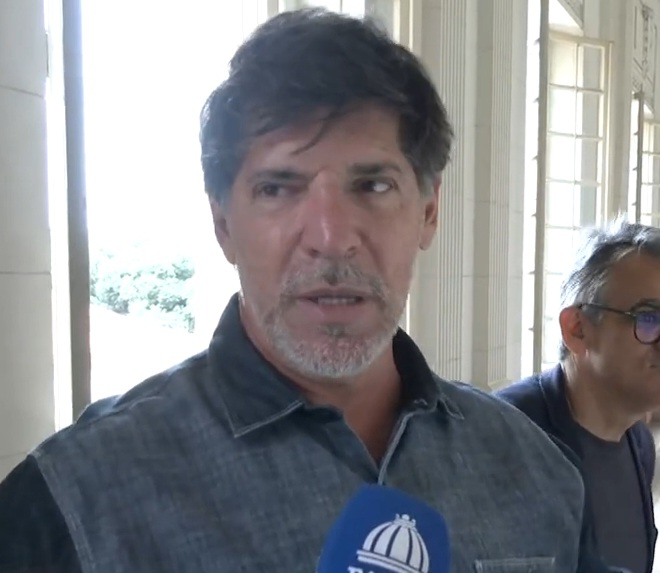
- Gottardo in 2025

Personal information
- Full name: Wilson Roberto Gottardo
- Date of birth: 23 May 1963 (age 63)
- Place of birth: Santa Bárbara d'Oeste, Brazil
- Height: 1.81 m (5 ft 11 1/2 in)
- Position: Defender

Team information
- Current team: (head coach)

Senior career*
Years	Team	Apps	(Gls)
1980–1982	União Barbarense		
1982–1986	Guarani	35	(1)
1986–1987	Náutico	13	(1)
1987–1990	Botafogo	64	(2)
1991–1993	Flamengo	35	(2)
1993–1994	Marítimo	10	(1)
1994–1995	Botafogo	49	(2)
1995	São Paulo		
1995–1996	Botafogo	21	(1)
1997	Fluminense		
1997–1998	Cruzeiro	41	(1)
1999	Sport	18	(0)

International career
1991	Brazil	6	(0)

Managerial career
- 2011: Villa Nova
- 2011: Bonsucesso
- 2015: Tupi
- 2015: São José
- 2016: Villa Nova
- * Club domestic league appearances and goals

Wilson Roberto Gottardo, commonly known as just Wilson Gottardo (born 23 May 1963), is a Brazilian former association footballer who played as a defender and the current coach of the Villa Nova-MG. He played in several Brazilian Série A clubs.

== Playing career ==
=== Club ===
Born in Santa Bárbara d'Oeste, he started his professional career in 1980 playing for União Barbarense of his native city. He left the club two years later to play for Guarani, then Gottardo defended Náutico in 1986 and in 1987. He joined Botafogo in 1987, winning the Campeonato Carioca in 1989 and in 1990, and joining Botafogo's arch-rival Flamengo in 1991, where he won the Campeonato Carioca in 1991, and the Série A in 1992, before leaving the club in 1993. Gottardo played 131 games and scored eight goals during his spell at Flamengo. After playing the 1993–94 season in Portugal with Marítimo, he won the Série A in 1995 with Botafogo. Wilson Gottardo played the 1995 season with São Paulo, returning for a third spell with Botafogo in 1995 and in 1996. Wilson Gottardo joined Cruzeiro in 1997, after playing for Fluminense in the same year. With Cruzeiro, he won the Campeonato Mineiro in 1997 and in 1998, and the Copa Libertadores in 1997. He left Cruzeiro in 1998 to play for Sport in 1999, when he won the Campeonato Pernambucano, and then retired.

=== International ===
Wilson Gottardo played six times for the Brazil national team in 1991, without scoring a goal, including three Copa América games. He played his first game for the Brazilian team on March 27, 1991, against Argentina, while his last game was played on July 13 of that year against Colombia.

== Honours ==
=== Club ===
Botafogo

- Campeonato Carioca: 1989, 1990
- Série A: 1995

Sport

- Campeonato Pernambucano: 1999

Flamengo

- Campeonato Carioca: 1991
- Série A: 1992

Cruzeiro

- Campeonato Mineiro: 1997, 1998
- Copa Libertadores: 1997
