= Jackson (footballer, born 1973) =

Brazilian footballer

Personal information
- Full name: Jackson Coelho Silva
- Date of birth: 23 March 1973 (age 53)
- Place of birth: Codó, Brazil
- Height: 1.72 m (5 ft 8 in)
- Position: Attacking midfielder

Senior career*
Years	Team	Apps	(Gls)
1993–1995	Maranhão		
1994	→ Mogi Mirim (loan)		
1995	Goiás	1	(0)
1996	Comercial (SP)		
1997–1998	Sport Recife	46	(8)
1999	Palmeiras	12	(0)
2000	Cruzeiro	29	(4)
2001	Internacional	24	(8)
2002	Etti Jundiaí	0	(0)
2002	Gama	24	(1)
2003–2004	Ituano	15	(0)
2003	→ Coritiba (loan)	37	(2)
2004	→ Emirates Club (loan)		
2005–2006	Coritiba	69	(8)
2007–2009	Vitória	70	(10)
2010	Santa Cruz	6	(1)
2010–2011	ABC	6	(2)

International career
1998	Brazil	3	(0)
- * Club domestic league appearances and goals

Jackson, full name Jackson Coelho Silva (born 23 March 1973), is a Brazilian former professional footballer. He played over 200 games in Campeonato Brasileiro Série A and capped for Brazil.

== Biography ==
Born in Codó, Maranhão, north-eastern Brazil, Jackson started his career at Maranhão, which he played 3 times in national cup in 1994 and 1995 season. He made his Série A debut with Goiás in 1995 season. He moved to Sport Recife in the 1997 season and started to become a regular starter. In 1999, he moved to Palmeiras and in 2000 moved to Cruzeiro. He was signed by Internacional in 2001. In the 2002 season, he represented Gama in Série A. In 2003, he played for Ituano in 2003 Copa do Brasil and moved to Coritiba at the start of 2003 Campeonato Brasileiro Série A. He joined the United Arab Emirati team Emirates Club in January 2004. He returned to Ituano in mid-year, played 15 times in 2004 Série B and finished as the losing quarter-finalists (not to be confused with Jakson who left Ituano in mid-year).

In February 2005, he was re-signed by Coritiba but relegated to Série B in 2006 season. In 2007, he was signed by Vitória on a free transfer, finished as the fourth of 2007 Série B and was promoted. In 2010 season he joined Santa Cruz of Série D and in September moved to ABC of Série C, which both team also competed 2010 Campeonato do Nordeste (but Jackson was signed after the registration deadline). The team finished as the Série C winner and promoted to 2011 Série B. He signed a new 1-year contract on 10 January 2011.

== Honours ==
- Copa Libertadores: 1999
- Copa do Brasil: 2000
- Campeonato Brasileiro Série C: 2010
- Torneio Rio-São Paulo: 2000
- Campeonato Baiano: 2007, 2008, 2009
- Campeonato Maranhense: 1993, 1994, 1995
- Campeonato Pernambucano: 1997, 1998
- Campeonato Potiguar: 2011
