= Juninho Petrolina =

Brazilian footballer

Personal information
- Full name: Hamilton Timbira Dias dos Santos Júnior
- Date of birth: 14 December 1974 (age 51)
- Place of birth: Juazeiro, Brazil
- Height: 1.75 m (5 ft 9 in)
- Position: Attacking midfielder

Team information
- Current team: FC Kəpəz
- Number: 99

Senior career*
Years	Team	Apps	(Gls)
1995–1997	Sport	25	(4)
1998	Atlético Mineiro	10	(0)
1999	Sport	14	(0)
2000	Vitória	16	(1)
2001	Santa Cruz		
- Náutico
- Beira-Mar
2004–2005	Belenenses	24	(1)
2005–2006	Penafiel	14	(0)
2007	Happy Valley		
2007	South China		
2007	ABC		
2008	América (RN)		
2010	Khazar	25	(13)
2011	→ FC Kəpəz (loan)		
- * Club domestic league appearances and goals as of 17 April 2008

Hamilton Timbira Dias dos Santos Júnior, best known as Juninho Petrolina (born 14 December 1974) is a Brazilian association football who plays for FC Kəpəz on loan from FK Khazar Lankaran as a midfielder.

== Career ==
Juninho Petrolina began his professional career in 1995 with Sport Club do Recife and played for a number of clubs in the Campeonato Brasileiro Série A, including Atlético Mineiro, Vitória, Santa Cruz and Náutico. He also played for Beira-Mar, Belenenses and F.C. Penafiel in Portugal and Happy Valley AA and South China in Hong Kong and FK Khazar Lankaran in Azerbaijan. He is currently playing for FC Kəpəz.
