= Gutemberg Leão =

Brazilian footballer

Gutemberg
Personal information
- Full name: Gutemberg Brauer Leão
- Date of birth: 31 July 1970 (age 56)
- Place of birth: Carlos Chagas, Brazil
- Height: 1.80 m (5 ft 11 in)
- Position: Midfielder

Youth career
- –1990: América Mineiro

Senior career*
Years	Team	Apps	(Gls)
1990–1993	América Mineiro		
1993–1997	Atlético Mineiro	99	(0)
1996	→ Guarani (loan)		
1998–2000	Sport Recife	65	(2)
2000	Gama		
2001	Matonense		
2001	ABC		
- * Club domestic league appearances and goals as of 18 October 2024

Gutemberg Brauer Leão (born 31 July 1970), simply known as Gutemberg, is a Brazilian former professional footballer who played as a midfielder.

== Career ==
Gutemberg began his career at América Mineiro, where he was state champion in 1993. The following year, he was hired by Atlético Mineiro, and was part of the 1997 Copa Conmebol champion squad. He also had notable spells at Sport, where he was twice state champion, and at Gama.

== Honours ==
América Mineiro

- Campeonato Mineiro: 1993

Atlético Mineiro

- Copa CONMEBOL: 1997
- Campeonato Mineiro: 1995
- Copa Centenário de Belo Horizonte: 1997

Sport

- Copa do Nordeste: 2000
- Campeonato Pernambucano: 1998, 1999, 2000

== Personal life ==
In 2021, a hoax appeared on the internet claiming that the former player was living on the streets, with serious financial problems. Despite his physical resemblance to the alleged beggar, the athlete was approached by journalists and denied the entire situation.
