= Irani (footballer) =

Brazilian footballer

Personal information
- Full name: Irani Pereira de Brito
- Date of birth: 1 March 1976
- Place of birth: Recife, Brazil
- Date of death: 31 December 2020 (aged 44)
- Place of death: Recife, Brazil
- Height: 1.83 m (6 ft 0 in)
- Position: Forward

Youth career
- –1997: Sport Recife

Senior career*
Years	Team	Apps	(Gls)
1996–2001	Sport Recife		
1997	→ Internacional (loan)		
1997	→ Guarani (loan)		
- * Club domestic league appearances and goals as of 1 February 2024

Irani Pereira de Brito (1 March 1976 – 31 December 2020), simply known as Irani, was a Brazilian professional footballer who played as a forward.

== Career ==
Great highlight of the 1997 Copa São Paulo de Futebol Jr. for Sport, Irani made history due to the final of the 1998 Pernambucano Championship, where he scored two goals. He won a three times the state championship in addition to the 2000 Copa do Nordeste.

== Honours ==
Sport

- Copa do Nordeste: 2000
- Campeonato Pernambucano: 1998, 1999, 2000

== Death ==
Irani died on 31 December 2020, at Getúlio Vargas Hospital in Recife, a victim of COVID-19.
