= Leandro Tavares =

Brazilian footballer

Personal information
- Full name: Leandro Rodrigues Tavares
- Date of birth: 25 January 1975 (age 51)
- Place of birth: Belo Horizonte, Brazil
- Height: 1.73 m (5 ft 8 in)
- Position: Left midfielder

Senior career*
Years	Team	Apps	(Gls)
1992–1999	Atlético Mineiro		
1995	→ Democrata-GV (loan)		
1998–1999	→ Sport (loan)		
2000–2002	Coritiba		
2001	→ Internacional (loan)		
2002	→ Matonense (loan)		
2003	Colibríes	17	(5)
2004	Brasiliense		
2006	Ceilândia		

International career
1991	Brazil U17	4	(1)
- * Club domestic league appearances and goals

Leandro Rodrigues Tavares (born 25 January 1975), also known as Leandro Tavares, is a retired football midfielder who played for several clubs in the Campeonato Brasileiro Série A and the Mexican Primera División. He also participated for Brazil at the 1991 FIFA U-17 World Championship finals in Italy.

== Career ==
Born in Belo Horizonte, Leandro Tavares began playing professional football with Clube Atlético Mineiro. He was loaned to Esporte Clube Democrata and Sport Club do Recife before he signed with Coritiba Foot Ball Club in 2000. After his first season, Coritiba loaned him to Sport Club Internacional and Sociedade Esportiva Matonense.

In 2003, he moved to Mexico to play for Colibríes de Morelos.

Leandro Tavares finished his career in Brazil playing for Brasiliense Futebol Clube and Ceilândia Esporte Clube.
