= Corozal, Honduras =

Village in Honduras

Corozal
- Village
- Interactive map of Corozal
- Coordinates: 16.3450°N 86.5136°W
- Country: Honduras
- Department: Atlántida
- Municipality: La Ceiba

Corozal is a village on the north (Caribbean) coast of Honduras, located near the city of La Ceiba. The majority of Corozal's population belongs to the Garifuna (Black Carib) ethnic group.
