= Leonardo (footballer, born 1974) =

Brazilian footballer

Personal information
- Full name: Leonardo Pereira da Silva
- Date of birth: 13 June 1974
- Place of birth: Picos, Brazil
- Date of death: 1 March 2016 (aged 41)
- Place of death: Recife, Brazil
- Height: 1.66 m (5 ft 5 in)
- Position: Forward

Youth career
- –1990: Picos

Senior career*
| Years | Team | Apps | (Gls) |
| 1990–1992 | Picos | | |
| 1992–1995 | Sport Recife | | |
| 1995 | Vasco da Gama | | |
| 1996 | Corinthians | 26 | (8) |
| 1996 | Palmeiras | 21 | (4) |
| 1997–2001 | Sport Recife | | |
| 2001–2002 | Cruzeiro | | |
| 2002 | Vitória | | |
| 2003 | América Mineiro | | |
| 2004 | Belenenses | | |
| 2004 | Sport Recife | | |
| 2004 | Paysandu | | |
| 2005–2006 | Santa Cruz | | |
| 2006 | Guarany de Sobral | | |
| 2007 | Treze | | |
| 2007 | Guarany de Sobral | | |
| 2008 | Picos | | |
| 2009 | Central | | |
| 2009 | Salgueiro | | |
| 2010–2011 | Sete de Setembro | | |
| 2011–2012 | Cametá | | |
| 2012 | Afogadense | | |

International career
| 1995 | Brazil U20 | | |
- * Club domestic league appearances and goals as of 14 October 2023

Leonardo Pereira da Silva (13 June 1974 – 1 March 2016), simply known as Leonardo, was a Brazilian professional footballer who played as a forward.

== Career ==
He emerged as champion of Piauí in 1991, at Picos. Negotiated with Sport, he won the Pernambuco championship three times and the 1994 Copa do Nordeste. He was negotiated with Vasco and later with Corinthians and Palmeiras, but he did not take revenge. Upon his return to Sport, he established himself as the club's biggest star, winning the state championship once again three more times.

In 1995 he was part of the Brazil under-20 team at the Toulon Tournament.

For Sport Recife he had 367 appearances and scored 133 goals.

== Honours ==
Picos

- Campeonato Piauiense: 1991

Sport

- Campeonato Pernambucano: 1992, 1994, 1995, 1998, 1999, 2000
- Copa do Nordeste: 1994, 2000

Brazil U20

- Toulon Tournament: 1995

Individual

- Campeonato Pernambucano top scorer: 1997, 1999

== Death ==
Leonardo was hospitalized at Restauração Hospital, Recife, on 3 February 2016 after suffering from a seizure. After MRI examinations, a large brain lesion was revealed, caused by neurocysticercosis. On March 1, he died at the age of 41. His body was laid to rest at the Sport Recife headquarters.
