= List of people with given name Sandra =

This is a list of people named Sandra.

== Academics ==
- Sandra Beckerman, Dutch archaeologist
- Sandra Bem, American psychologist
- Sandra Boehringer, French historian
- Sandra Dawson (academic), British social scientist and academic
- Sandra M. Faber, American astronomer
- Sandra Gilbert, American academic
- Sandra Harding, American philosopher
- Sandra Mackey, American expert on Middle Eastern culture and politics
- Sandra Lee McKay, American sociolinguist
- Sandra Myres, American historian
- Sandra Quackenbush, American virologist
- Sandra Scarr, American psychology professor
- Sandra Steingraber, American biologist
- Sandra Stinnett, American statistician

== Activists ==
- Sandra Brown (campaigner), Scottish campaigner
- Sandra Feldman, American civil rights activist
- Sandra Froman, American president of the National Rifle Association
- Sandra Goldschmidt (born 1976), German trade unionist
- Sandra Kwikiriza, Ugandan feminist and digital rights activist
- Sandra Postel, American environmentalist
- Sandra Schnur, American disability rights activist
- Sandra Stotsky, American education reformist

== Actresses ==
- Sandra Bernhard (born 1955), American actress
- Sandra Blázquez (born 1987), Spanish actress
- Sandra Bréa (1952–2000), Brazilian actress and model
- Sandra Bullock (born 1964), American actress
- Sandra Will Carradine (born 1947), American actress
- Sandra Dee (1942–2005), American film actress
- Sandra Dickinson (born 1948), American actress
- Sandra Echeverría (born 1984), Mexican actress and singer
- Sandra Escacena (born 2001), Spanish actress
- Sandra Ferguson (born 1967), also Sandra Reinhardt, American actress
- Sandra Gough (born 1943), British actress
- Sandra Gould (1916–1999), American actress
- Sandra Hess (born 1968), Swiss actress
- Sandra Hüller (born 1978), German actress
- Sandra Kerns (born 1949), American actress
- Sandra McCoy (born 1979), American actress
- Sandra Milo (1933–2024), Italian actress
- Sandra Moser (born 1969), Swiss actress
- Sandra Nelson (born 1964), American actress
- Sandra Ng (born 1965), Hong Kong actress
- Sandra O'Ryan (born 1960), Chilean actress
- Sandra Oh (born 1971), Canadian actress of Korean descent
- Sandra Pêra (born 1954), Brazilian actress
- Sandra Prinsloo (born 1947), South African actress
- Sandra Prosper, American actress
- Sandra Shamas, Canadian actress
- Sandra Shaw, American actress
- Sandra Zober, American actress

== Artists ==
- Sandra Bell-Lundy, Canadian comic strip artist
- Sandra Blain (born 1941) American ceramicist
- Sandra Blow, English painter
- Sandra Bowden, American painter
- Sandra Choi, British designer
- Sandra Cretu, German popular singer/songwriter
- Sandra Fabara, Lady Pink, American graffiti artist
- Sandra Llano-Mejía (born 1951), Colombian multimedia artist, video artist
- Sandra Magsamen (born 1959), American author, artist, art therapist, and designer
- Sandra Mansour, Lebanese fashion designer
- Sandra Payne (1951–2021), American visual artist
- Sandra Rauch, German artist

== Cinema, radio and television ==
- Sandra Gugliotta, Argentine film director
- Sandra Lee, American author and television chef
- Sandra Tsing Loh, American radio personality
- Sandra Masone, American TV producer
- Sandra Nashaat, Egyptian director
- Sandra Studer, Swiss television personality
- Sandra Weintraub, American television writer

== Fictional characters ==
- Sandra, a character played by Marion Cotillard in the 2014 Belgian film Two Days, One Night
- Sandra, a character voiced by Erin Yvette from video game The Walking Dead
- Sandra Briggs, a character from British soap opera Emmerdale
- Sandra Clark, a character played by Jackée Harry on the television series 227
- Sandra Corleone, a character from The Godfather series
- Sandra "Sandy" Dombrowski, a main character in the 1971 musical Grease

== Journalists ==
- Sandra Baumgartner, German journalist and reporter
- Sandra Bookman, American television news reporter and anchor
- Sandra Golpe, Spanish journalist
- Sandra Gwyn, Canadian journalist
- Sandra Maischberger, German journalist
- Sandra Sully, Australian journalist

== Judges ==
- Sandra Beckwith, American judge
- Sandra Segal Ikuta, American judge
- Sandra Lea Lynch, American judge
- Sandra Day O'Connor, American justice of the Supreme Court of the United States
- Sandra Roper, American civil rights lawyer and judge

== Models ==
- Sandra Angelia, Indonesian model
- Sandra Lynne Becker, American model
- Sandra Edwards, American model
- Sandra Force, American model
- Sandra Howard, English model
- Sandra Hubby, American model
- Sandra Nyanchoka, Kenyan model
- Sandra Settani, American model

== Musicians ==
- Sandra (singer) (Sandra Ann Lauer), German singer
- Sandra Barber, American singer
- Sandra Chambers, Italian singer
- Sandra Chapin, American songwriter
- Sandra Collins, American DJ
- Sandra Cretu, Sandra, German singer/songwriter
- Sandra Crouch, American singer
- Sandra Denton, American singer
- Sandra Dianne, Malaysian singer-songwriter
- Sandra Gillette, American musician
- Sandra Kerr, English singer
- Sandra Kim, Belgian singer
- Sandra Lyng Haugen, Norwegian singer
- Sandra McCracken, American singer
- Sandra Mihanovich, Argentine singer
- Sandra Nasić, German singer
- Sandra Nurmsalu, Estonian singer and violinist
- Sandra Oxenryd, Swedish singer
- Sandra "Lois" Reeves, American singer
- Sandra Schleret, Austrian singer
- Sandra Sully (songwriter), American musician
- Sandra Tilley, American musician
- Sandra Wright Shen, American pianist
- Sandra Zaiter, Puerto Rican singer

== Politicians ==
- Sandra Beckerman, Dutch politician
- Sandra Botha, South African Politician
- Sandra Bussin, Canadian politician
- Sandra Cobena, Canadian politician
- Sandra Bolden Cunningham, American First Lady of Jersey City
- Sandra Andersen Eira (born 1986), Norwegian Sami politician
- Sandra Frankel, American politician
- Sandra Funken (born 1980), German politician
- Sandra Gidley, British politician
- Sandra Goudie, New Zealand politician
- Sandra Harwood (born 1950), American politician
- Sandra Hietel-Heuer (born 1981), German politician
- Sandra Johann (born 1985), German politician
- Sandra Ablamba Johnson, Togolese economist and politician
- Sandra Kalniete, Latvian politician
- Sandra Kanck, Australian politician
- Sandra Lee-Vercoe, New Zealand politician
- Sandra Lewandowska, Polish politician
- Sandra Lovelace Nicholas, Canadian politician
- Sandra Mason, Barbadian politician and Governor-General of Barbados
- Sandra Mariela Mendoza, Argentine politician
- Sandra Nori, Australian politician
- Sandra Osborne, Scottish politician
- Sandra Pierantozzi, Palauan politician
- Sandra M. Pihos, American politician
- Sandra Pupatello, Canadian politician
- Sandra Roelofs, Dutch first lady of Georgia
- Sandra Skalvig, Danish politician
- Sandra L. Smith, Canadian politician
- Sandra Sönnergren (born 1990), Swedish politician
- Sandra Weegels (born 1981), German politician
- Sandra Márjá West, Norwegian Sami politician
- Sandra Ward, British Virgin Islands civil servant
- Sandra White, Scottish politician
- Sandra Zampa, Italian politician

== Sports ==
- Sandra Abstreiter, German ice hockey goaltender
- Sandra Allen, Australian softball player
- Sandra Andersson, Swedish footballer
- Sandra Andriamarosoa, Malagasy tennis player
- Sandra Azón, Spanish sailor
- Sandra Beavis, Australian swimmer
- Sandra Bezic, Canadian figure skater
- Sandra Cam, Belgian freestyle swimmer
- Sandra Chick, Zimbabwean field hockey player
- Sandra Dawson (cricketer) (born 1962), Irish cricketer
- Sandra Dawson (runner) (born 1970), Australian runner
- Sandra Dombrowski, Swiss ice hockey player and referee
- Sandra Douglas, British athlete
- Sandra Farmer-Patrick, American athlete
- Sandra Gasser, Swiss athlete
- Sandra Glover, American athlete
- Sandra Góngora (born 1985), Mexican ten-pin bowler
- Sandra Greaves, Canadian judoka
- Sandra Haynie, American golfer
- Sandra Izbaşa, Romanian gymnast
- Sandra Jenkins, Canadian curler
- Sandra Jessen (born 1995), Icelandic footballer
- Sandra Kälin (born 1971), Swiss football manager and former footballer
- Sandra Keith, Canadian athlete
- Sandra Kiriasis, German bobsledder
- Sandra Kloesel, German tennis player
- Sandra Le Poole, Dutch field hockey player
- Sandra Levy, Canadian field hockey player
- Sandra Lizé, Canadian water polo player
- Sandra Mackie, New Zealand field hockey player
- Sandra Moya, Puerto Rican track and field athlete
- Sandra Myers, Spanish sprinter
- Sandra Neilson, American swimmer
- Sandra Owusu-Ansah, Ghanaian footballer
- Sandra Palmer (golfer), American golfer
- Sandra Perković, Croatian athlete
- Sandra de Pol (born 1975), Swiss footballer
- Sandra Post, Canadian golfer
- Sandra Reynolds Price, South African tennis player
- Sandra Ruales, Ecuadorian athlete
- Sandra Rucker, American figure skater
- Sandra Schmirler, Canadian curler
- Sandra Schumacher, German cyclist
- Sandra Seuser, German sprinter
- Sandra Soldan, Brazilian athlete
- Sandra Stals, Belgian runner
- Sandra Völker, German swimmer
- Sandra Wagner-Sachse, German athlete

== Writers ==
- Sandra Alland, Canadian poet
- Sandra Birdsell, Canadian writer
- Sandra Boynton, American writer
- Sandra Brown, American writer
- Sandra M. Castillo, American poet
- Sandra Cisneros, American author and poet
- Sandra Dempsey, Canadian playwright
- Sandra Djwa (born 1939), Canadian writer
- Sandra Jackson-Opoku, American writer
- Sandra Kitt, American writer
- Sandra McDonald, American author
- Sandra Miesel, American writer
- Sandra Sabatini, Canadian writer
- Sandra Scoppettone, American author
- Sandra Worth, Canadian author

== Multiple people ==
- Sandra Payne (disambiguation)
- Sandra Smith (disambiguation)
- Sandra Williams (disambiguation)

== Other people ==
- Sandra Cantu (2001–2009), American murder victim
- Sandra Ciesek (born 1978), German physician and virologist
- Sandra Dewi (born 1983), is an Indonesian actress, businesswoman, and brand ambassador
- Sandra Diaz-Twine (born 1974), American television personality
- Sandra Good (born 1944), American member of Manson Family
- Sandra Keller (born 1967), Sultaana Freeman, American Muslim
- Sandra Lerner (born 1955), American businesswoman
- Sandra Magnus (born 1964), American astronaut
- Sandra Rozzo, American murder victim
- Sandra Scheuer, murdered American student
- Sandra Tanner (born 1941), American critic of The Church of Jesus Christ of Latter-day Saints

== See also ==
- Sander (name)
- Sandrine
- Sandro
- Sondra
- Sandy (given name)
