= 2000 Sport Club do Recife season =

Sport Recife
2000 season
- Chairman: Luciano Caldas Bivar
- Manager: Émerson Leão; Mauro Fernandes; Celso Roth; José Carlos Amaral
- Stadium: Ilha do Retiro
- Copa João Havelange: Quarter-finals
- Pernambucano: Champions (33rd title)
- Copa do Brasil: First round
- Copa do Nordeste: Champions (2nd title)
- Copa dos Campeões: Runners-up
- Top goalscorer: League: Leonardo and Taílson (13); All: Adriano (27)
Home colours	Away colours	Third colours

The 2000 season was Sport Recife's 96th season in the club's history. Sport competed in the Campeonato Pernambucano, Copa do Brasil, Copa do Nordeste, Copa dos Campeões and Copa João Havelange.

== Statistics ==
=== Overall ===
Games played	76 (12 Copa do Nordeste, 29 Pernambucano, 2 Copa do Brasil, 5 Copa dos Campeões, 28 Copa João Havelange)
Games won	45 (7 Copa do Nordeste, 21 Pernambucano, 1 Copa do Brasil, 2 Copa dos Campeões, 14 Copa João Havelange)
Games drawn	15 (3 Copa do Nordeste, 5 Pernambucano, 0 Copa do Brasil, 0 Copa dos Campeões, 7 Copa João Havelange)
Games lost	16 (2 Copa do Nordeste, 3 Pernambucano, 1 Copa do Brasil, 3 Copa dos Campeões, 7 Copa João Havelange)
Goals scored	153
Goals conceded	72
Goal difference	+81
Best results (goal difference)	6–0 (A) v Atlético Mineiro - Copa João Havelange - 2000.11.19
Worst result (goal difference)	0–3 (A) v Ponte Preta - Copa João Havelange - 2000.09.27
Top scorer	Adriano (27)

Source: Sport Recife official website

=== Goalscorers ===
Place	Pos.	Nat.	Name	Copa do Nordeste	Campeonato Pernambucano	Copa do Brasil	Copa dos Campeões	Copa João Havelange	Total
1	MF	(Brazil)	Adriano	4	14	0	3	6	27
2	MF	(Brazil)	Nildo	2	13	0	3	7	25
3	FW	(Brazil)	Leonardo	1	6	0	0	13	20
4	FW	(Brazil)	Jaques	3	15	0	0	0	18
5	FW	(Brazil)	Taílson	0	0	0	0	13	13
6	FW	(Brazil)	Sandro Gaúcho	0	5	0	0	1	6
7	DF	(Brazil)	Érlon	2	0	0	0	3	5
7		(Brazil)	Reinaldo	2	3	0	0	0	5
8	MF	(Brazil)	Léomar	2	0	0	1	1	4
8	MF	(Brazil)	Lima Sergipano	1	1	0	0	2	4
8	MF	(Brazil)	Wallace	2	1	1	0	0	4
9	FW	(Brazil)	Marquinhos	0	0	0	2	1	3
9	FW	(Brazil)	Rosivaldo	2	1	0	0	0	3
9	DF	(Brazil)	Russo	0	2	0	0	1	3
10	FW	(Brazil)	Ricardinho	0	0	0	0	2	2
10	DF	(Brazil)	Sandro Blum	1	1	0	0	0	2
11		(Brazil)	Chiquinho	0	1	0	0	0	1
11	FW	(Brazil)	Irani	0	1	0	0	0	1
11		(Brazil)	Isaías	0	1	0	0	0	1
11	MF	(Brazil)	Juninho Rodrigues	0	1	0	0	0	1
11	FW	(Brazil)	Jurandir	0	1	0	0	0	1
11	DF	(Brazil)	Sangaletti	1	0	0	0	0	1
11		(Brazil)	Sidnei	0	0	0	0	1	1
			Own goals	0	2	0	0	0	2
			Total	23	69	1	9	51	153

== Competitions ==
=== Copa do Nordeste ===
==== Group stage ====
19 January 2000 1	CSA	0–2	Sport	Maceió
(UTC-3)			Sandro Blum; Leonardo	Stadium: Estádio Rei Pelé

23 January 2000 2	Sport	2–0	Botafogo–PB	Recife
(UTC-3)	Wallace; Rosivaldo			Stadium: Estádio Adelmar da Costa Carvalho (Ilha do Retiro)

26 January 2000 3	Sport	1–2	Poções	Recife
(UTC-3)	Lima Sergipano			Stadium: Estádio Adelmar da Costa Carvalho (Ilha do Retiro)

29 January 2000 4	Poções	0–1	Sport	Poções
(UTC-3)			Rosivaldo	Stadium: Estádio Heraldo Curvelo

2 February 2000 5	Botafogo–PB	0–1	Sport	João Pessoa
(UTC-3)			Wallace	Stadium: Estádio José Américo de Almeida Filho (Almeidão)

5 February 2000 6	Sport	6–1	CSA	Recife
(UTC-3)	Adriano, Érlon; Léomar, Jaques			Stadium: Estádio Adelmar da Costa Carvalho (Ilha do Retiro)

==== Second stage ====
12 February 2000	Treze	2–0	Sport	Campina Grande
(UTC-3)				Stadium: Estádio Governador Ernani Sátyro (Amigão)

17 February 2000	Sport	3–0	Treze	Recife
(UTC-3)	Nildo; Adriano; Jaques			Stadium: Estádio Adelmar da Costa Carvalho (Ilha do Retiro)

==== Semi-finals ====
19 February 2000	Poções	1–1	Sport	Poções
16:00 (UTC-3)	Zé Mário 66'		Reinaldo 87'	Stadium: Estádio Heraldo Curvelo; Referee: Marco Antonio Colares

24 February 2000	Sport	2–0	Poções	Recife
20:30 (UTC-3)	Adriano 57'; Reinaldo 74'			Stadium: Estádio Adelmar da Costa Carvalho (Ilha do Retiro)

==== Finals ====
26 February 2000	Vitória	2–2	Sport	Salvador
16:00 (UTC-3)	Cláudio 27'; Manoel 70'		Jaques 46'; Nildo 74'	Stadium: Estádio Manoel Barradas (Barradão); Attendance: 3,093; Referee: Antônio Pereira da Silva

1 March 2000	Sport	2–2	Vitória	Recife
21:40 (UTC-3)	Érlon 15'; Sangaletti 51'		Cláudio 28'; Manoel 39'	Stadium: Estádio Adelmar da Costa Carvalho (Ilha do Retiro); Attendance: 33,392; Referee: Oscar Roberto de Godói

==== Record ====
Final Position	Points	Matches	Wins	Draws	Losses	Goals For	Goals Away	Avg%
1st	24	12	7	3	2	23	10	66%

=== Campeonato Pernambucano ===
==== First stage ====
17 May 2000 1*	Sport	3–1	Recife	Recife
(UTC-3)	Leonardo, Chiquinho			Stadium: Estádio Adelmar da Costa Carvalho (Ilha do Retiro)

7 February 2000 2	Sport	3–2	Íbis	Recife
(UTC-3)	Lima Sergipano; Rosivaldo; Leonardo			Stadium: Estádio Adelmar da Costa Carvalho (Ilha do Retiro)

14 February 2000 3	Central	0–3	Sport	Caruaru
(UTC-3)			Adriano; Reinaldo; Irani

22 February 2000 4	Ferroviário	1–2	Sport	Serra Talhada
(UTC-3)			Alexandre (o.g.); Adriano

3 March 2000 5	Sport	2–1	Unibol Pernambuco	Recife
(UTC-3)	Isaías; Adriano			Stadium: Estádio Adelmar da Costa Carvalho (Ilha do Retiro)

9 March 2000 6	Recife	3–2	Sport	Recife
(UTC-3)			Russo; Nildo

12 March 2000 7	Sport	3–0	Porto	Recife
(UTC-3)	Reinaldo; Juninho Rodrigues; Jurandir			Stadium: Estádio Adelmar da Costa Carvalho (Ilha do Retiro)

15 March 2000 8	Sport	1–0	Vitória das Tabocas	Recife
(UTC-3)	Jaques			Stadium: Estádio Adelmar da Costa Carvalho (Ilha do Retiro)

19 March 2000 9	Náutico	0–1	Sport	Recife
(UTC-3)			Adriano	Stadium: Estádio Eládio de Barros Carvalho (Aflitos)

==== Second stage ====
26 March 2000 1	Sport	1–1	Santa Cruz	Recife
(UTC-3)	Jaques			Stadium: Estádio Adelmar da Costa Carvalho (Ilha do Retiro)

1 April 2000 2	Íbis	0–1	Sport	Paulista
(UTC-3)			Jaques

5 April 2000 3	Sport	3–0	Central	Recife
(UTC-3)	Adriano; Jaques; Wallace			Stadium: Estádio Adelmar da Costa Carvalho (Ilha do Retiro)

9 April 2000 4	Sport	3–0	Ferroviário	Recife
(UTC-3)	Jaques; Nildo,			Stadium: Estádio Adelmar da Costa Carvalho (Ilha do Retiro)

16 April 2000 5	Unibol Pernambuco	0–3	Sport	Paulista
(UTC-3)			Jaques, Adriano

22 April 2000 6	Sport	2–2	Recife	Recife
(UTC-3)	Jaques; Adriano			Stadium: Estádio Adelmar da Costa Carvalho (Ilha do Retiro)

29 April 2000 7	Porto	2–2	Sport	Caruaru
(UTC-3)			Russo; Nildo

3 May 2000 8	Vitória das Tabocas	1–4	Sport	Vitória de Santo Antão
(UTC-3)			Jaques, Adriano,

7 May 2000 9	Sport	1–2	Náutico	Recife
(UTC-3)	Adriano			Stadium: Estádio Adelmar da Costa Carvalho (Ilha do Retiro)

==== Third stage ====
14 May 2000 1	Santa Cruz	3–2	Sport	Recife
(UTC-3)			Jaques; Sandro Blum	Stadium: Estádio José do Rego Maciel (Arruda)

20 May 2000 2	Central	1–4	Sport	Caruaru
(UTC-3)			Adriano; Jaques; Sandro Gaúcho; Nildo

24 May 2000 3	Sport	2–0	Porto	Recife
(UTC-3)	Leonardo; Sandro Gaúcho			Stadium: Estádio Adelmar da Costa Carvalho (Ilha do Retiro)

28 May 2000 4	Sport	4–0	Náutico	Recife
(UTC-3)	Leonardo; Sandro Gaúcho; Nildo,			Stadium: Estádio Adelmar da Costa Carvalho (Ilha do Retiro)

31 May 2000 5	Santa Cruz	0–0	Sport	Recife
(UTC-3)				Stadium: Estádio José do Rego Maciel (Arruda)

3 June 2000 6	Recife	0–2	Sport	Recife
(UTC-3)			Nildo; Adriano

11 June 2000 7	Sport	5–0	Central	Recife
(UTC-3)	Nildo, Leonardo; Adriano,			Stadium: Estádio Adelmar da Costa Carvalho (Ilha do Retiro)

13 June 2000 8	Porto	0–3	Sport	Caruaru
(UTC-3)			Nildo, Jaques

16 June 2000 9	Náutico	1–1	Sport	Recife
(UTC-3)			Alex (o.g.)	Stadium: Estádio Eládio de Barros Carvalho (Aflitos)

18 June 2000 10	Sport	3–0	Santa Cruz	Recife
(UTC-3)	Reinaldo; Jaques; Sandro Gaúcho			Stadium: Estádio Adelmar da Costa Carvalho (Ilha do Retiro)

==== Final ====
21 June 2000	Sport	3–2	Santa Cruz	Recife
(UTC-3)	Sandro Gaúcho; Nildo; Jaques			Stadium: Estádio Adelmar da Costa Carvalho (Ilha do Retiro)

==== Record ====
Final Position	Points	Matches	Wins	Draws	Losses	Goals For	Goals Away	Avg%
1st	68	29	21	5	3	69	23	78%

(*) Postponed round due to changes in competition schedules

=== Copa do Brasil ===
==== First round ====
22 March 2000	América–RN	0–1	Sport	Natal
(UTC-3)			Wallace	Stadium: Estádio Dr. João Cláudio Vasconcelos Machado (Machadão)

29 March 2000	Sport	0–1 (2–4 p)	América–RN	Recife
(UTC-3)				Stadium: Estádio Adelmar da Costa Carvalho (Ilha do Retiro)

==== Record ====
Final Position	Points	Matches	Wins	Draws	Losses	Goals For	Goals Away	Avg%
51st	3	2	1	0	1	1	1	50%

=== Copa dos Campeões ===
==== First stage ====
12 July 2000	América–MG	2–1	Sport	João Pessoa
19:00 (UTC-3)	Wellington Paulo 68'; Denis 75'		Nildo 40'	Stadium: Estádio José Américo de Almeida Filho (Almeidão)

15 July 2000	Sport	3–0	América–MG	Maceió
18:30 (UTC-3)	Leomar 65'; Adriano 79'; Marquinhos 83'			Stadium: Estádio Rei Pelé

==== Semi-finals ====
19 July 2000	Sport	1–2	São Paulo	Maceió
21:45 (UTC-3)	Nildo 48'		Ilan 55'; Marcelinho Paraíba 78'	Stadium: Estádio Rei Pelé; Referee: Márcio Rezende de Freitas

22 July 2000	São Paulo	1–3	Sport	João Pessoa
16:00 (UTC-3)	Marcelinho Paraíba 16'		Adriano 37', 56'; Marquinhos 79'	Stadium: Estádio José Américo de Almeida Filho (Almeidão); Referee: Antônio Pereira da Silva

==== Final ====
7 July 2000	Palmeiras	2–1	Sport	Maceió
21:45 (UTC-3)	Asprilla 32'; Alberto 54'		Nildo 90+1'	Stadium: Estádio Rei Pelé; Attendance: 22,560; Referee: Carlos Eugênio Simon

==== Record ====
Final Position	Points	Matches	Wins	Draws	Losses	Goals For	Goals Away	Avg%
2nd	6	5	2	0	3	9	7	40%

=== Copa João Havelange ===
==== First stage ====
29 July 2000 1	Vasco da Gama	0–2	Sport	Rio de Janeiro
16:00 (UTC-3)			Leonardo; Taílson	Stadium: Estádio Vasco da Gama (São Januário)

2 August 2000 2	Coritiba	0–0	Sport	Curitiba
20:30 (UTC-3)				Stadium: Estádio Major Antônio (Couto Pereira)

13 August 2000 3	Sport	1–1	Cruzeiro	Recife
18:30 (UTC-3)	Sandro Gaúcho			Stadium: Estádio Adelmar da Costa Carvalho (Ilha do Retiro)

20 August 2000 4	Juventude	1–1	Sport	Caxias do Sul
16:00 (UTC-3)			Nildo	Stadium: Estádio Alfredo Jaconi

27 August 2000 5	Sport	2–0	Goiás	Recife
18:30 (UTC-3)	Russo; Taílson			Stadium: Estádio Adelmar da Costa Carvalho (Ilha do Retiro)

2 September 2000 6	Vitória	4–3	Sport	Salvador
15:45 (UTC-3)			Lima Sergipano; Taílson; Ricardinho	Stadium: Estádio Manoel Barradas (Barradão)

7 September 2000 7	Grêmio	1–0	Sport	Porto Alegre
18:00 (UTC-3)				Stadium: Estádio Olímpico Monumental

9 September 2000 8	Sport	1–1	Guarani	Recife
18:00 (UTC-3)	Érlon			Stadium: Estádio Adelmar da Costa Carvalho (Ilha do Retiro)

13 September 2000 9	Sport	4–1	Atlético Paranaense	Recife
20:30 (UTC-3)	Taílson, Nildo; Leonardo			Stadium: Estádio Adelmar da Costa Carvalho (Ilha do Retiro)

17 September 2000 10	Palmeiras	1–1	Sport	São Paulo
17:00 (UTC-3)			Érlon	Stadium: Estádio Palestra Itália (Parque Antártica)

20 September 2000 11	Sport	3–0	Bahia	Recife
20:30 (UTC-3)	Taílson; Lima Sergipano; Adriano			Stadium: Estádio Adelmar da Costa Carvalho (Ilha do Retiro)

24 September 2000 12	Portuguesa	1–0	Sport	São Paulo
16:00 (UTC-3)				Stadium: Estádio Oswaldo Teixeira Duarte (Canindé)

27 September 2000 13	Ponte Preta	3–0	Sport	Campinas
20:30 (UTC-3)				Stadium: Estádio Moisés Lucarelli

30 September 2000 14	Sport	3–2	Fluminense	Recife
18:00 (UTC-3)	Leonardo, Taílson			Stadium: Estádio Adelmar da Costa Carvalho (Ilha do Retiro)

4 October 2000 15	Santa Cruz	0–3	Sport	Recife
20:30 (UTC-3)			Adriano; Leonardo,	Stadium: Estádio José do Rego Maciel (Arruda)

7 October 2000 16	Sport	3–0	Gama	Recife
16:00 (UTC-3)	Nildo, Leonardo			Stadium: Estádio Adelmar da Costa Carvalho (Ilha do Retiro)

14 October 2000 17	Flamengo	1–2	Sport	Rio de Janeiro
18:00 (UTC-3)			Taílson,	Stadium: Estádio Jornalista Mário Filho (Maracanã)

22 October 2000 18	Sport	2–2	Botafogo	Recife
17:00 (UTC-3)	Nildo; Taílson			Stadium: Estádio Adelmar da Costa Carvalho (Ilha do Retiro)

25 October 2000 19	Sport	3–1	Corinthians	Recife
22:00 (UTC-3)	Érlon; Adriano; Leonardo			Stadium: Estádio Adelmar da Costa Carvalho (Ilha do Retiro)

28 October 2000 20	Sport	0–1	Internacional	Recife
18:00 (UTC-3)				Stadium: Estádio Adelmar da Costa Carvalho (Ilha do Retiro)

8 November 2000 21	Sport	4–3	São Paulo	Recife
21:40 (UTC-3)	Nildo, Taílson; Adriano			Stadium: Estádio Adelmar da Costa Carvalho (Ilha do Retiro)

11 November 2000 22	Santos	3–1	Sport	Santos
16:00 (UTC-3)			Ricardinho	Stadium: Estádio Urbano Caldeira (Vila Belmiro)

16 November 2000 23	Sport	1–0	América–MG	Recife
20:30 (UTC-3)	Adriano			Stadium: Estádio Adelmar da Costa Carvalho (Ilha do Retiro)

19 November 2000 24	Atlético Mineiro	0–6	Sport	Belo Horizonte
16:00 (UTC-3)			Leonardo,,,, Taílson	Stadium: Estádio Governador Magalhães Pinto (Mineirão)

==== Second stage ====
22 November 2000	Remo	1–2	Sport	Belém
21:00 (UTC-3)	Robinho 51'		Sidnei 59'; Marquinhos 83'	Stadium: Estádio Olímpico do Pará (Mangueirão); Attendance: 22,734; Referee: Paulo César de Oliveira

26 November 2000	Sport	1–0	Remo	Recife
17:00 (UTC-3)	Léomar 74'			Stadium: Estádio Adelmar da Costa Carvalho (Ilha do Retiro); Attendance: 36,698; Referee: Márcio Rezende de Freitas

==== Quarter-finals ====
30 November 2000	Grêmio	2–1	Sport	Porto Alegre
21:40 (UTC-3)	Ronaldinho 41', 45'		Taílson 61'	Stadium: Estádio Adelmar da Costa Carvalho (Ilha do Retiro); Attendance: 34,656; Referee: Márcio Rezende de Freitas

3 December 2000	Sport	1–1	Grêmio	Recife
16:00 (UTC-3)	Adriano 60'		Ronaldinho 54' (pen.)	Stadium: Estádio Adelmar da Costa Carvalho (Ilha do Retiro); Attendance: 46,018; Referee: Paulo César de Oliveira

==== Record ====
Final Position	Points	Matches	Wins	Draws	Losses	Goals For	Goals Away	Avg%
5th	49	28	14	7	7	51	31	58%
