= Sandro Gaúcho =

Sandro Gaúcho may refer to:

- Sandro Gaúcho (footballer, born 1968), Sandro Rogério Formoso Pires, Brazilian football forward
- Sandro Gaúcho (footballer, born 1974), Sandro Araújo da Silva, Brazilian football midfielder

== See also ==
- Sandro
- Gaucho
