= Sander (disambiguation) =

Sander is a power tool used for smoothing wood.

Sander may also refer to:

== People ==
- Henry Frederick Conrad Sander, German botanist whose standard author abbreviation is Sander
- Sander (name), a list of people with the name Sander
- Sander (footballer) (born 1990), a Brazilian footballer
- Sander Sybrandy (born 2004), Dutch footballer

== Places ==
- Sander, Norway, a small village in the municipality of Sør-Odal in Innlandet county, Norway
- Sander (crater), a crater on Mercury

== Other ==
- Sander (fish), a genus of fish that includes the walleye and zander
- sander, a computer program in the AMBER#Programs molecular dynamics simulation package.
- Sandbox (locomotive) on a locomotive to provide improved traction.
- A sander to spread sand on icy roads in winter.

== See also ==
- Chander
- Kander (disambiguation)
- Sandar (disambiguation)
- Sanders (disambiguation)
- Xander (disambiguation)
- Zander (disambiguation)
