= Kander =

Kander may refer to:

== Rivers ==
- Kander (Switzerland)
- Kander (Germany)

== People with the surname ==
- Jason Kander (born 1981), American politician
- John Kander (born 1927), American composer of the songwriting team Kander and Ebb
- Lizzie Black Kander (1858-1941), American writer and activist
- Nadav Kander (born 1961), British photographer
- Simon Kander (1848-1931), American politician

== Places ==
- Reichenbach im Kandertal, a village in Switzerland

== See also ==
- Chander
- Sander (disambiguation)
- Xander (disambiguation)
- Zander (disambiguation)
