= Sander (surname) =

Sander is a surname, and may refer to:

- Agnes Sander-Plump (1888–1980), German painter
- Alex Sander (born 1997), Indonesian footballer
- Andreas Sander (born 1989), German alpine skier
- Anne Sander (politician) (born 1973), French economist and politician
- August Sander (1876–1964), German portrait and documentary photographer
- B. J. Sander (born 1980), American football player
- Beate Sander, Canadian health economist
- Bertha Sander (1901–1990), German interior designer
- Bill Sander (born 1956), American golfer
- Brenden Sander (born 1995), American volleyball player
- Bruno Sander (1884–1979), Austrian geologist
- Casey Sander (born 1956), American actor
- Chris Sander (footballer) (born 1962), Welsh footballer
- Chris Sander (Missouri politician), American politician from Missouri
- Chris Sander (scientist), German computational biologist
- Cindy Sander (born 1978), French singer
- Cliff Sander (1931–2022), Australian soccer player
- Elizabeth Sander (died 1607), English nun and writer
- Elliot G. Sander, American businessman
- Erol Sander (born 1968), Turkish-German actor
- Erwin Sander (1892–1962), German general
- Eugene G. Sander (1935–2026), American academic
- Frank Sander (1927–2018), American law professor
- Friedrich Wilhelm Sander (1885-1938), German rocket engineer
- Hans-Heinrich Sander (1945–2017), German politician
- Helge Sander (born 1950), Danish politician
- Helke Sander (born 1937), German film director and writer
- Hellen Sander (born 1954), Canadian cross-country skier
- Henry Frederick Conrad Sander (1847–1920), German orchidologist and nurseryman
- Herbert Sander (1879–1947), Danish fencer
- Ian Sander (1947–2016), American television actor, director and producer
- Ingrid Sander (born 1937), Venezuelan fencer
- Jacob Sander (1828–1904), American cattle dealer and politician from Wisconsin
- Jean-Marie Sander (born 1949), French private banker
- Jil Sander (born 1943), German fashion designer
- Karin Sander (born 1957), German artist
- Klemens Sander (born before 1980, Austrian baritone
- Kurt Sander (born 1969), American composer
- Leonard Sander, American physicist
- Ley Sander, Brazilian neurologist
- Lori Garcia Sander, American politician from Colorado
- Maike Sander (born 1967), German-American physician and academic
- Maria Sander (1924–1999), German sprinter
- Mark Sander (born 1968), American football player
- Mart Sander (born 1967), Estonian filmmaker
- Michelle Sander, German optical engineer
- Norbert Sander (1942–2017), American marathon runner
- Otto Sander (1941–2013), German actor
- Paige Sander (born 1995), American volleyball player
- Petrik Sander (born 1960), German footballer and manager
- Philipp Sander (born 1998), German footballer
- Ralf Sander (born 1963), German sculptor
- Richard Sander (born 1956), American legal scholar
- Robert Sander (born 1974), American lawyer
- Selina Frey-Sander (born 1999), German acrobatic gymnast
- Taylor Sander (born 1992), American volleyball player, brother of Brenden Sander
- Theo Sander (born 2005), Danish-French footballer
- Therese Sander (born 1948), American politician and farmer from Missouri
- Tim Sander (born 1978), German actor
- Walter Sander, German canoeist
- Wilhelm Sander (1860–1930), German architect

== See also ==
- Murder of Emily Sander
- Sande (surname)
- Zander (disambiguation)
