= Sandrine =

Sandrine is a French female name. It is a diminutive form of Sandra, a shortened form of Alexandra, the female version of Alexander, which means Protector of Men. There are variants such as Sandrilene.

== People ==
- Sandrine (singer), Australian singer-songwriter of pop music
- Sandrine Bailly, French biathlete
- Sandrine Bideau (born 1989), French cyclist
- Sandrine Blancke, Belgian actress
- Sandrine Blazy, French computer scientist
- Sandrine Bonnaire, French actress
- Sandrine Corman, Belgian model
- Sandrine Doucet, French politician
- Sandrine Dudoit, French-American statistician
- Sandrine François, French singer
- Sandrine Fricot, French high jumper
- Sandrine Gaillard (born 1996), Swiss footballer
- Sandrine Holt, Canadian actress
- Sandrine Kiberlain, French actress
- Sandrina Malakiano, Indonesian journalist
- Sandrine Nosbé, French politician
- Sandrine Piau, French opera singer
- Sandrine Pinna, Taiwanese actress
- Sandrine Renard, Canadian journalist
- Sandrine Revel, French comics illustrator and author
- Sandrine Tas, Belgian inline speed skater and long track speed skater
- Sandrine Testud, French tennis player
- Sandrine Veysset, French film director

== Fictional characters ==
- Sandrilene fa Toren, character from Tamora Pierce's Circle of Magic series

== See also ==
- Sandra (given name)
- Sandro (disambiguation)
- Sandy (disambiguation)
