= Sandro Goiano =

Sandro Goiano may refer to:

- Sandro Goiano (footballer, born 1973), Sandro Gomes da Luz, Brazilian defensive midfielder
- Sandro Goiano (footballer, born 1978), Sandro da Cunha Carneiro, Brazilian forward

== See also ==
- Sandro (disambiguation)
