= Sandro =

Sandro is an Italian, Spanish, Swiss, Georgian and Croatian given name, often a diminutive of Alessandro or Alexander. It is also a surname.

Sandro may refer to:

== Given name or nickname ==
=== Sports ===
- Sandro (footballer, born 1973), Brazilian footballer Sandro Chaves de Assis Rosa
- Sandro (footballer, born 1974), Spanish footballer Carlos Alejandro Sierra Fumero
- Sandro (footballer, born 1980), Brazilian footballer Sandro Cardoso dos Santos
- Sandro (footballer, born 1981), Brazilian footballer Alexsandro Oliveira Duarte
- Sandro (footballer, born March 1983), Brazilian footballer Sandro Luiz da Silva
- Sandro (footballer, born October 1983), Brazilian footballer Sandro da Silva Mendonça
- Sandro (footballer, born 1986), Brazilian footballer Sandro José Ferreira da Silva
- Sandro (footballer, born February 1987), Brazilian footballer Sandro Costa da Silva
- Sandro (footballer, born March 1987), Brazilian footballer Alessandro Ferreira Leonardo
- Sandro (footballer, born 1988), Brazilian footballer Sandro Silva de Souza
- Sandro (footballer, born 1989), Brazilian footballer Sandro Raniere Guimarães Cordeiro
- Sandro Alfaro (born 1971), Costa Rican former footballer
- Sandro Barbosa (born 1973), Brazilian footballer Sandro Barbosa Carneiro da Cunha
- Sandro Becker (born 1971), Brazilian footballer
- Sandro Bellucci (born 1955), Italian retired race walker
- Sandro Blum (born 1970), Brazilian footballer
- Sandro Burki (born 1985), Swiss footballer
- Sandro Casamonica (born 1969), Italian boxer
- Sandro Ceppolino (born 1974), Argentine-born Italian rugby union coach and former player
- Sandro Cois (born 1972), Italian retired footballer
- Sandro Continenza (1920–1996), Italian screenwriter
- Sandro Cortese (born 1990), German motorcycle racer
- Sandro Dias (born 1975), Brazilian skateboarder
- Sandro Djurić (born 1994), Austrian footballer
- Sandro Ehrat (born 1991), Swiss tennis player
- Sandro Floris (born 1965), Italian retired sprinter
- Sandro Forner (born 1970), Brazilian football coach and former player
- Sandro Gamba (born 1932), Italian former basketball player and coach
- Sandro Gaúcho (footballer, born 1968), Brazilian footballer
- Sandro Gaúcho (footballer, born 1974), Brazilian footballer
- Sandro Goiano (footballer, born 1973), Brazilian footballer
- Sandro Goiano (footballer, born 1978), Brazilian footballer
- Sandro Gotal (born 1991), Austrian footballer
- Sandro Hiroshi (born 1979), Japanese-Brazilian footballer
- Sandro Iashvili (born 1985), Georgian footballer
- Sandro Lombardi (born 1986), Swiss footballer
- Sandro Lopopolo (1939–2014), Italian boxer
- Sandro Mamukelashvili (born 1999), American-born Georgian basketball player
- Sandro Manoel (born 1988), Brazilian footballer
- Alessandro Melli (born 1969), Italian retired footballer
- Sandro Mendes (born 1977), retired footballer from Cape Verde
- Sandro Michel (born 1996), Swiss bobsledder
- Sandro Munari (born 1940), Italian former motor racing and rally driver
- Alessandro Nannini (born 1959), Italian retired racing driver
- Sandro Nicević (born 1976), Croatian basketball player
- Sandro Puppo (1918–1986), Italian football player and manager
- Sandro Ramírez (born 1995), Spanish footballer
- Sandro Salvioni (born 1953), Italian football manager and former player
- Sandro Schwarz (born 1978), German football manager and former player
- Sandro Silva (born 1984), Brazilian footballer
- Sandro Sirigu (born 1988), Italian-German footballer
- Sandro Stielicke (born 1986), German skeleton racer
- Sandro Sukno (born 1990), Croatian water polo player
- Alexander Todua (born 1987), Georgian rugby union player
- Sandro Tomaš (born 1972), Croatian medley swimmer
- Sandro Tonali (born 2000), Italian footballer
- Sandro Trolliet (born 1988), Swiss curler
- Sandro Viana (born 1977), Brazilian sprinter
- Sandro Viletta (born 1986), Swiss alpine skier and 2014 Olympic gold medalist
- Sandro Wagner (born 1987), German footballer

=== Arts and entertainment ===
- Sandro Acerbo (born 1955), Italian voice actor
- Sandro Angiolini (1920–1985), Italian comics creator
- Sandro Bocola (1931–2022), Italian writer and artist
- Sandro Bolchi (1924–2005), Italian director, actor and journalist
- Sandro Botticelli (c. 1445–1510), Italian painter
- Sandro Corsaro, American animator and author
- Sandro Ghenzi, Italian film producer in the 1940s and '50s
- Sandro Giacobbe (1949–2025), Italian singer-songwriter
- Sandro Key-Åberg (1922–1991), Swedish poet and novelist

=== Other ===
- Sandro Bondi (born 1959), Italian politician
- Sandro Filho (born 2005), Brazilian politician
- Sandro Marcos (born 1994), Filipino congressman
- Sandro Mareco (born 1987), Argentine chess grandmaster
- Sandro Mariátegui Chiappe (1921–2013), Prime Minister of Peru in 1984
- Sandro Paris, fashion brand
- Sandro Pertini (1896–1990), Italian journalist and socialist politician, seventh President of the Italian Republic
- Sandro Pignatti (1930–2025), Italian botanist
- Sandro Rosa do Nascimento (1978–2000), perpetrator of the Bus 174 hostage crisis
- Sandro Ruotolo (born 1955), Italian journalist and politician
- Sandro Veronesi (writer) (born 1959), Italian writer
- Alessandro Faedo (1913–2001), Italian mathematician and politician

== Stage name ==
- Sandro de América, Argentine singer and actor Roberto Sánchez-Ocampo (1945–2010)

== Surname ==
- Alex Sandro (born 1991), Brazilian footballer
- Corsi Sandro, Italian engineer
- Marlon Sandro (born 1977), Brazilian mixed martial artist

== See also ==
- Sandra (given name)
- Sander (name)
- Sondra
- Alessandro
- Alexander
- Alejandro
- Sandroni
