= Masone (surname) =

Masone is a surname. Notable people with the surname include:

- Giovanni Masone (c. 1453–c. 1510), Italian painter
- Sandra Masone, American boom operator

== See also ==
- Mason (surname)
- Masone (disambiguation)
