= Sandrini =

Sandrini is an Italian surname. Notable people with the surname include:

- Domenico Sandrini (1883–1973), Italian skier and ski jumper
- Luis Sandrini (1905–1980), Argentine film actor and producer
- Mattia Sandrini (born 1993), Italian footballer
- Peter Sandrini (born 1961), Italian-born translation theorist and terminologist
