= Woh Jo Hasina =

- Promotional poster
- Directed by: Deepak Bahry
- Produced by: C.P. Sharma
- Starring: Mithun Chakraborty; Ranjeeta Kaur; Pran; Kader Khan; Prema Narayan; Rajendranath; Satyen Kappu; Madan Puri; Chander
- Music by: Raam Laxman
- Release date: 1983
- Running time: 125 minutes
- Country: India
- Language: Hindi

Woh Jo Hasina is a 1983 Indian Hindi-language film. It was directed by Deepak Bahry, starring Mithun Chakraborty, Ranjeeta Kaur, Pran, Kader Khan, Prema Narayan, Rajendranath, Satyen Kappu, Madan Puri and Chander.

== Cast ==
- Mithun Chakraborty as Harish Maheshwari
- Ranjeeta Kaur as Hasina
- Pran as Radheshyam
- Kader Khan as Sardar
- Prema Narayan as Champa
- Rajendranath as Trimurti
- Satyen Kappu as S.P Anand
- Madan Puri as Damodar Das
- Chander as Ashok Maheshwari

== Songs ==
1. "Chand Chal Tu Zara Dheeme Dheeme" (Happy) – Kishore Kumar
2. "Chand Chal Tu Zara Dheeme Dheeme" (Sad) – Kishore Kumar
3. "Rabba Mujhe Kya Ho Gaya" – Lata Mangeshkar
4. "Zora Zori" – Asha Bhosle, Amit Kumar
5. "Lag Ja Gale Se Ae Tanhaai" – Usha Mangeshkar, Nitin Mukesh
6. "Dulhan Banoongi Doli Chadoongi" – Lata Mangeshkar, Manna Dey
7. "Kab Ke Bichhde" – Asha Bhosle
