= Sebastian Koch (politician) =

German politician

Member of the Landtag of Saxony-Anhalt
- Assuming office 6 October 2026
- Succeeding: Sandra Hietel-Heuer
- Constituency: Gardelegen-Klötze

Personal details
- Born: 1986 or 1987 (age 39–40)
- Party: Alternative for Germany

Sebastian Koch (born 1986 or 1987) is a German politician who was elected member of the Landtag of Saxony-Anhalt in 2026. He has served as chairman of the Alternative for Germany in Altmarkkreis Salzwedel since 2017.
