= Xandra =

Xandra is a given name or a nickname for Alexandra (alternate spelling Zandra). Xandra (Zandra) is the feminine equivalent of Xander (Zander).

People

- Xandra Breakefield, American neurologist
- Xandra Ibarra (born 1979), American performance artist
- Xandra Velzeboer (born 2001), Dutch speed skater

Other

- Xandra (band), a Dutch musical group
- Xandra no Daibōken: Valkyrie to no Deai, an action-adventure platform game
- Xandra, a character played by Sheryl Cruz in Komiks Presents: Varga
- Xandra, a fictional character in Doom 2099
- Xandra, Goddess of Adventure, a fictional character in Legend of the Three Caballeros
- Xandra Neramani, a character in Marvel Comics

== See also ==
- Xander
- Sandra (given name)
- Sander (name)
- Alexandra
