= Paulo Martins (footballer, born 1991) =

Brazilian footballer

Personal information
- Full name: Paulo César da Silva Martins
- Date of birth: 20 November 1991 (age 34)
- Place of birth: São Paulo, Brazil
- Height: 1.85 m (6 ft 1 in)
- Position: Defender

Team information
- Current team: Khonkaen
- Number: 32

Senior career*
Years	Team	Apps	(Gls)
2011	Juazeiro	0	(0)
2011	Poções	1	(0)
2012	Serrano	0	(0)
2013	Monte Carlo	19	(0)
2014–2015	Payam Mashhad F.C.		
2015	Al Ittihad Kalba	15	(0)
2015	Songkhla United	19	(0)
2016	PSM Makassar	17	(0)
2017–	Khonkaen	0	(0)

International career^{‡}
2014	Timor-Leste U-23	2	(0)
2014–2015	Timor-Leste	6	(0)
- * Club domestic league appearances and goals as of 21 February 2015 ‡ National team caps and goals as of 16 June 2015

Paulo César da Silva Martins (born 20 November 1991) is a Brazilian footballer. He is currently playing for Khonkaen. Martins is a very experienced footballer having also played for Juazeiro, EC Poções, and Serrano SC in Brazil, Monte Carlo in Macau, and Payam Mashhad in Iran.

On 19 January 2017, the Asian Football Confederation declared Paulo Martins and eleven other Brazilian men's footballers ineligible to represent East Timor.
