= Gaucho (disambiguation) =

A gaucho (gaúcho in Portuguese) is a South American cattle herder.

Gaucho or The Gaucho may also refer to:

== Arts and entertainment ==
- The Gaucho, a 1927 adventure film starring Douglas Fairbanks
- Guacho (film), a 1954 Argentine film
- Il Gaucho, a 1964 Italian comedy film
- Gaucho, a play by Doug Lucie
- Gaucho, a character in the 1952 film The Bad and the Beautiful, played by Gilbert Roland
- The Gaucho, an Argentine member of the Batmen of All Nations, a DC Comics superhero group

== Music ==
- Gaucho (album), a 1980 album by Steely Dan, or the title song
- "Gaúcho" (song), a Brazilian tango
- O gaúcho, an 1870 novel by the Brazilian writer José de Alencar

== Vehicles ==
- GMC Gaucho, a mid 1970s full-sized van model produced by General Motors
- VLEGA Gaucho, a 4x4 vehicle developed for the armies of Argentina and Brazil

== Sports ==
- Campeonato Gaúcho, a Brazilian state football league.
- Sport Club Gaúcho, a Brazilian football club
- UC Santa Barbara Gauchos, the sports teams of the University of California, Santa Barbara
- San Diego Gauchos, an American soccer team from 2002 to 2006

== People ==
Gaúcho is a common nickname for a person born in the Brazilian state of Rio Grande do Sul:

- Gaúcho (footballer, born 1953), Carlos Roberto Orrigo da Cunha, Brazilian football centre-back and coach
- Gaúcho (footballer, born 1964) (1964–2016), Brazilian football player and coach, Luís Carlos Tóffoli
- Gaúcho (footballer, born 1972), Eric Freire Gomes, Brazilian football striker
- Cléber Gaúcho (born 1974), Brazilian football player
- Gaúcho (footballer, born 1980), full name Márcio Rodrigo Trombetta, Brazilian football centre-back
- Diego Gaúcho (born 1981), Brazilian football player
- Eric Freire Gomes (born 1972), Brazilian football player from Pernambuco
- Éder Gaúcho (born 1977), Brazilian retired football player
- Edson Gaúcho (born 1955), Brazilian retired football player
- Fernando Gaúcho (born 1980), Brazilian football player
- Lucas Gaúcho (born 1991), Brazilian football player
- Luís Fernando Gaúcho (born 1955), Brazilian retired football player
- Rafael Gaúcho (born 1982), Brazilian football player
- Renato Gaúcho (born 1962), Brazilian football player and manager
- Roger Gaúcho (born 1986), Brazilian football player
- Rogério Gaúcho (born 1979), Brazilian football player from Paraná
- Ronaldinho (born 1980), Brazilian football player
- Sandro Gaúcho (footballer, born 1974) (born 1974), Brazilian retired football player
- Thiago Corrêa (born 1982), Brazilian football player
- Tiago Gaúcho (born 1984), Brazilian football player
- Antonio Rivero ("El Gaucho"), a gaucho who led eight men in murdering five prominent people in the Falkland Islands in 1833

== Other uses ==
- El Gaucho (disambiguation)
- Gaucho (currency), a proposed currency that was intended to be used by Argentina and Brazil
- Gaucho, a trade name for the insecticide imidacloprid
- A British chain of Argentinian-themed steak restaurants.
- A type of women's clothing, a combination of a romper suit and culottes.
- Gaucho is a Tunisian biscuit produced by Saida

== See also ==
- Gauche (disambiguation)
