= Gauche =

Gauche may refer to:

- Literal left-hand-referenced relative direction:
  - A style of Western fencing using the main-gauche, i.e. the parrying dagger, normally held in the left hand
  - Rive Gauche, on the southern (i.e., left, when facing down the direction of flow) bank of the Seine in Paris, France
- Stereochemistry:
  - Gauche conformation, a torsion angle of ±60° in alkane stereochemistry
  - Gauche effect, a characterization in which the gauche rotamer is more stable than the anti rotamer
- Gauche (Scheme implementation), an implementation of the Scheme programming language
- "Gauche the Cellist", short story by Kenji Miyazawa about the eponymous hypothetical cellist
- Laura Gauché (born 1995), French alpine ski racer

== See also ==
- Left (disambiguation)
- Gaucho (disambiguation)
