= Sandra Payne =

Sandra Payne may refer to:

- Sandra Payne (actress) (born 1944) English actress
- Sandra Payne (artist) (1951–2021) American visual artist
