= Sandar =

Sandar may refer to:

== People ==
- Sandar (actress) (1949–2006), Burmese actress
- Alek Sandar (born 1987), Bulgarian music producer and songwriter
- Ma Sandar (born 1947), Burmese writer
- Sandar Min (born 1968), Burmese politician
- Sandar Win (born 1952), Burmese politician

== Places ==
- Sandar, Cambodia, a commune in Leuk Daek District
- Sandar, Malta, a zone in Mtarfa
- Sandar Municipality, a former municipality in Vestfold county, Norway
- Sandar prestegjeld, a former geographic subdivision of the Church of Norway in Vestfold county, Norway
- Sandar, Sierra Leone, a chiefdom of Kailahun District

== Other ==
- Sandar (landform), an outwash plain formed by glacial action.
- Sandar IL, club in Sandefjord, Norway
- Juilin Sandar, a character in Wheel of Time

== See also ==
- Sander (disambiguation)
- Sandara
- Sandra (disambiguation)
