= Lester Julian Merriweather =

American collagist, painter (born 1978)

- Born: 1978 (age 46–47); Memphis, Tennessee, U.S.
- Education: Jackson State University, Memphis College of Art, Skowhegan School of Painting and Sculpture
- Occupation(s): Visual artist, curator
- Known for: Collage art

Lester Julian Merriweather (born 1978) is an American visual artist and curator, known for his collage. He lives in Memphis, Tennessee.

== Biography ==
Lester Julian Merriweather was born in 1978 in Memphis, Tennessee, into an African-American family. He received a BA degree in 2000 from Jackson State University; and a MFA degree in 2002 from Memphis College of Art. Merriweather also attended the Skowhegan School of Painting and Sculpture in 2002.

In response to a lack of support and spaces for Black artists in Memphis, Merriweather, working alongside Frank D. Robinson Jr., Vitus Shell, and Jerry and Terry Lynn (or Twins) created the NIA Artist Collective in 2001. He worked as a curatorial director at the Martha and Robert Fogelman Galleries at the University of Memphis.

In his early career he worked in painting and sculpture. Merriweather's collage art is often made from fashion magazines and advertising. He uses images that focus on racial prominence, and systems that perpetuate social privilege, and then the images are re-contextualized in the collage with the goal of dismantling stereotypes and confronting institutional racism. He has exhibited his work at the Zachęta National Gallery of Art in Warsaw, Poland. His work is in the museum collection at the Birmingham Museum of Art.

== See also ==
- List of African-American visual artists
- Sandra Payne (artist), another collage artist
