= Masone (disambiguation) =

Masone is a municipality in Genoa in Italy.

Masone may also refer to:

- Masone (surname)
- Masone, a hamlet of Reggio Emilia, Italy
