= Sandra (given name) =

- Gender: Feminine

Other gender
- Masculine: Alexander

Origin
- Language: Greek
- Meaning: "Defender, protector of man"

Other names
- Variant form: Cassandra
- Related names: Alexandra

Sandra is a female name, which is often used as a short form for Alexandra or Cassandra.

Alexandra is a feminine form of the male name Alexander, which is a romanization of the Greek name Ἀλέξανδρος, Alexandros. It is generally interpreted to mean "protector of man" or "defender of man".

The name Cassandra is also from Greek: Κασσάνδρα ("she who entangles men"). The prophetess and goddess Cassandra is known in Greek mythology as the daughter of King Priam and Queen Hecuba of Troy.

The name has the Italian variations Sandrella and Sandrina. In French, forms such as Sandrine and Sandrelle. In Brazilian Portuguese, there are forms such as Sandrelly, Sandriela, Sandriele, Sandriely, and others (a calque of the Italian Sandrella).

== See also ==
- List of people with given name Sandra
- Sander (name)
- Sondra
- Sandro
- Xandra (disambiguation)
- Xander
