= El Gaucho =

A gaucho is an Argentine horseman. El Gaucho may refer to:

- "El Gaucho", a track on the Wayne Shorter album Adam's Apple
- El Gaucho Martín Fierro, an epic poem by the Argentine writer José Hernández
- El Gaucho y el diablo, a 1952 Argentine film

== See also ==
- Gaucho (disambiguation)
