= Sandroni =

- Language: Italian

Origin
- Origin: Sandro
- Meaning: "Son of Sandro" or "descendant of Alexander"
- Region of origin: Tuscany, Italy

Sandroni is an Italian surname of patronymic origin, derived from the given name Sandro, a diminutive of Alessandro (the Italian form of Alexander), meaning "defender of mankind". The suffix -oni denotes either augmentation or family lineage, so the surname literally means "son or descendant of Sandro/Alessandro".

== History ==
Historical references indicate that the Sandroni lineage has its roots in Tuscany, particularly in the provinces of Arezzo and Pisa. Parish and civic registries from the 17th and 18th centuries record several Sandroni families engaged in trade, agriculture, and local governance in the Casentino and Valdarno areas.

The surname later appeared in neighboring regions such as Umbria and Emilia-Romagna, reflecting the internal migration typical of post-unification Italy. Members of the Sandroni family emigrated during the late 19th and early 20th centuries, contributing to Italian communities in Argentina, Brazil, France, and the United States.

== Origin and Distribution ==
The name originates in the Tuscany region of central Italy, with documented presence in Arezzo and Pisa. Modern surname distribution studies show that "Sandroni" remains most frequent in Tuscany, particularly the Province of Arezzo.

== Notable people ==
Notable individuals with the surname include:

- Alejandro Sandroni (born 1972), Argentine football player and manager
- Carlos Sandroni (born 1958), Brazilian musician and writer
- Cícero Sandroni (1935–2025), Brazilian journalist and writer
- Luciana Sandroni (born 1962), Brazilian author
- Paulo Sandroni (born 1944), Brazilian economist
- Simone Sandroni (born 1960s), Italian–Belgian choreographer and stage director
- Ernesto Sandroni (20th century), Italian footballer

== See also ==
- Italian surnames
- Tuscany

== See also ==
- Sandrone, the traditional mask and character of the Commedia dell'arte for the Italian city of Modena
- Sandrini, people with this surname
