= Sandra Williams =

Sandra Williams may refer to:

- Sandra Williams (American politician)
- Sandra Williams (Guyanese activist)

== See also ==
- Saundra Williams, from the Sharon Jones & the Dap-Kings
