= Sandra Smith =

Sandra Smith may refer to:

- Sandra L. Smith, former leader of the Communist Party of Canada (Marxist-Leninist)
- Sandra Dorne (née Smith; 1924–1992), actress
- Sandra Smith (actress), American actress
- Sandra Smith (criminal) (1965–1989), South African woman sentenced to death for murder, the last woman to be executed in the country
- Sandra Smith (reporter) (born 1980), reporter for the Fox Business Network in New York City
- Sandra Smith (cyclist) (born 1968), Australian Paralympian
- Sandra Smith (long jumper), winner of the 1961 USA Indoor Track and Field Championships

== See also ==
- Sandy Smith (disambiguation)
