= Peter Sandrini =

- Born: 20 February 1961 (age 65); Bozen, Italy

Academic background
- Thesis: Terminologiearbeit im Recht: Deskriptiver begriffsorientierter Ansatz vom Standpunkt des Übersetzers (1996)

Academic work
- Discipline: Translation studies
- Institutions: University of Innsbruck
- Main interests: Terminology, multilingualism, legal translation, language for specific purposes, translation technology, globalization

Peter Sandrini (born 20 February 1961) is an Italian-born translation theorist and terminologist. He is currently researcher at the University of Innsbruck at the department of translation studies.

== Early life and career ==
Peter Sandrini was born on 20 February 1961 in Bozen, Italy. In 1988 Sandrini graduated from the University of Innsbruck in Translation studies. He completed his PhD with a dissertation on legal terminology Terminologiearbeit im Recht: Deskriptiver begriffsorientierter Ansatz vom Standpunkt des Übersetzers in 1996.

Since 1992 he works as a senior researcher at the University of Innsbruck. In 1991 he was one of the founders of the professional translators association in South Tyrol Landesverband der Übersetzer (LDÜ) – L’Unione Provinciale dei Traduttori (UPT) where he served as executive director until 1994.

From 1999 to 2001 Sandrini participated in an EU-funded research project in collaboration with the European Academy of Bozen on legal and administrative terminology: Interreg II Programm der EU: Sondermaßnahme zur Überwindung der Probleme, die aufgrund der verschiedenen Sprachen, Verwaltungsverfahren und Rechtssysteme dies- und jenseits der Grenze entstehen. From 2007 to 2009 he contributed to the EU Tempus Project CD_JEP-40090-2005 Foreign Languages in the Field of Law, when a new Centre for Foreign Languages at the Faculty of Law at the University of Zagreb was launched. In 2007 Sandrini launched the computer-aided translation project tuxtrans, a Linux distribution with a collection of free translation tools.

== Works ==
Monographs

- Probleme der italienisch-deutschen Übersetzung im Bereich des Kündigungsschutzes unter Berücksichtigung der Südtirol-spezifischen Anwendungsproblematik. Glossar. Master Thesis. Innsbruck 1988.
- Terminologiearbeit im Recht. Deskriptiver, begriffsorientierter Ansatz vom Standpunkt des Übersetzers. TermNet, Vienna 1996, ISBN 3-901010-15-7.

Edited Volumes (selection)

- Übersetzen von Rechtstexten. Fachkommunikation im Spannungsfeld zwischen Rechtsordnung und Sprache. Narr, Tübingen 1999, ISBN 3-8233-5359-4.
- Terminology and Knowledge Engineering. Proceedings of the 5th International Congress on Terminology and Knowledge Engineering TKE'99. TermNet, Wien 1999, ISBN 3-901010-24-6.
- TermLeg 1.0 – Vertragsrecht: Ein terminologischer Vergleich Italienisch – Deutsch. Studia, Innsbruck 2001, ISBN 3-901502-30-0.
- TermLeg 2.0 – Arbeitsrecht: Ein terminologischer Vergleich Italienisch – Deutsch. Studia, Innsbruck 2002, ISBN 3-901502-39-4.
- Fluctuat nec mergitur. Translation und Gesellschaft. Festschrift für Annemarie Schmid zum 75. Geburtstag. Peter Lang, Frankfurt 2005, ISBN 3-631-52542-7.
- with Ingeborg Ohnheiser and Wolfgang Pöckl: Translation – Sprachvariation – Mehrsprachigkeit. Festschrift für Lew Zybatow zum 60. Geburtstag. Peter Lang, Frankfurt am Main, ISBN 978-3-631-60000-9.

Papers (selection)

- Legal Terminology. Some Aspects for a New Methodology. In: Hermes Journal of Linguistics. 22. Aarhus School of Business 1999. pp. 101–112.
- Localization and Translation. In: MuTra Journal, Vol 2, 2008. LSP Translation Scenarios. Selected Contributions to the EU Marie Curie Conference Vienna 2007. Edited by Heidrun Gerzymisch-Arbogast, Gerhard Budin, Gertrud Hofer. pp. 167–191.
- Der transkulturelle Vergleich von Rechtsbegriffen. In: Susan Šarčević (ed.): Legal Language in Action: Translation, Terminology, Drafting and Procedural Issues. Globus, Zagreb 2009, ISBN 978-953-167-226-9, pp. 151–165.
- The Parameters of Multilingual Legal Communication in a Globalized World. In: Comparative Legilinguistics. International Journal for Legal Communication. 2009, 1, pp. 34–48.
- Translation Practice in South Tyrol: Towards a commitment to professional translation expertise. In: Hannes Obermair, Harald Pechlaner (eds.): Eurac Research: Inventing Science in a Region. Eurac Research, Bozen-Bolzano 2022, doi:10.57749/a924-n835.
