= Sandra Stotsky =

American academic

Sandra Stotsky is Professor emerita in the Department of Education Reform at the University of Arkansas, and held the 21st Century Chair in Teacher Quality. Her research ranges from teacher licensure tests, e.g., (1), coherence in the literature and reading curriculum, e.g., (2), and academic achievement in single-sex classrooms, e.g., (3) to critiques of Common Core’s standards in English language arts, e.g., (4) mathematics.(5), and US History and civic education (6), and other aspects of the Common Core project, e.g., (7), and to reviews of books in education, e.g., (8) She is an advocate of standards-based reform and strong academic standards and assessments for students and teachers.

From 2004 to 2006, she was a Research Scholar in the School of Education at Northeastern University. From 1984 to 2000, she was a research associate at the Harvard Graduate School of Education affiliated with the Philosophy of Education Research Center (PERC). For 12 years, she directed a summer institute on civic education at the Harvard Graduate School of Education, sponsored by the Lincoln and Therese Filene Foundation. From 1991-1997, she served as editor of Research in the Teaching of English, the research journal sponsored by the National Council of Teachers of English. On a consultant basis from 1992 to 2002, she worked for the United States Information Service and the U.S. State Department on the development of civic education programs in Poland, Lithuania Ukraine, and Romania with educators and ministry officials in Eastern Europe. She has also worked on two UNESCO-sponsored curriculum development and teacher training projects, one in Amman, Jordan in 2006 with officials in the Afghan Ministry of Education, and one in Beirut, Lebanon in 2014 with educators from 20 Arab countries in the Middle East and North Africa. She has taught elementary school, French and German at the high school level, and undergraduate and graduate courses in reading, children's literature, and writing pedagogy.

She is editor of and contributor to What's at Stake in the K-12 Standards Wars: A Primer for Educational Policy Makers (Peter Lang, 2000) and author of Losing Our Language (Free Press, 1999, reprinted by Encounter Books, 2002). Her most recent book is on teacher licensing regulations and tests (1). Her publications address many areas and disciplines in education, including civic education. She currently serves on the Advisory Board for Pioneer's InstituteCenter for School Reform and the Carus Publishing Company and on the Board of Directors for the American Council of Trustees and Alumni and the National Association of Scholars. She is also on the Professional Development and Governmental Affairs Committees for the International Dyslexia Association. She served on Common Core’s Validation Committee (2009–2010), the Massachusetts Board of Elementary and Secondary Education (2006–2010), and the Steering Committee for the National Assessment of Educational Progress (NAEP) reading assessment standards framework (2003–2004) for the 2009 assessment and beyond. She received a B.A. degree with distinction in French Literature from the University of Michigan and a doctorate in reading research and reading education with distinction from the Harvard Graduate School of Education.

While serving as Senior Associate Commissioner in the Massachusetts Department of Education from 1999 to 2003, she directed complete revisions of the state's preK-12 standards for every major subject that have been judged among the best in the country by independent experts for the Thomas B. Fordham Institute in two decades of reviews of state standards. On the 2005, 2007, 2009, 2011, and 2013 tests given by NAEP, Massachusetts students had the highest average scores in grades 4 and 8 in both mathematics and reading, The scores of the state’s low-income students, compared with those in other states on NAEP's 2007 tests, were tied for first place in grades 4 and 8 mathematics and in grade 4 reading. In grade 8 reading, they were tied for second place.

For results on international tests in mathematics and science (TIMSS) given in 2007 and 2013, Massachusetts 4th graders ranked second worldwide in science achievement and tied for third in mathematics; the state’s 8th graders tied for first in science and ranked sixth in mathematics. The Bay State percent of public high school students passing Advanced Placement courses with a 3 or more is a larger percentage than in most other states in the nation and well above the national average of 15.2 percent.

She served on the National Mathematics Advisory Panel in 2006 and co-authored its final report: Foundations for Success, as well as two of its task group reports, one on Assessment, and the other on Conceptual Knowledge and Skills.

== Essays ==
1. An Empty Curriculum: The Need to Reform Teacher Licensing Regulations and Tests. (2015). Rowman & Littlefield. See, also,“Can a state department of education increase teacher quality? Lessons learned in Massachusetts.” With Lisa Haverty. (2004). In D. Ravitch (Ed.), Brookings papers on education policy, 2004 (pp. 131–180). Washington, DC: Brookings Institution.

2. The death and resurrection of a coherent literature curriculum: What secondary English teachers can do. (2012). Rowman & Littlefield.

3. Single-sex classrooms and reading achievement: An exploratory study. (2012). Co-authored with George Denny. Journal of School Choice, 6 (4), 439-464.

4. How Common Core's ELA standards place college readiness at risk. Co-authored with Mark Bauerlein. (September 2012), Pioneer Institute White Paper # 89. https://pioneerinstitute.org/download/how-common-cores-ela-standards-place-college-readiness-at-risk/

5. Lowering the bar: How Common Core math fails to prepare students for STEM. Co-authored with R. James Milgram. (September 2013). Pioneer Institute White Paper #103. https://pioneerinstitute.org/news/lowering-the-bar-how-common-core-math-fails-to-prepare-students-for-stem/

6. Imperiling the Republic: The Fate of US History under Common Core. Co-authored with Ralph Ketcham and Anders Lewis. (September 2014). Pioneer Institute White Paper # 121. (https://pioneerinstitute.org/featured/study-common-core-ela-standards-will-further-harm-u-s-history-instruction/

7. “An Invalid Validation of the Common Core Standards” (pp. 55–72) and “How Did Charlatans Ever Get to Design National English Standards, and Why Would We Respect Them?” (pp. 103–122). In K. Lombard (Ed.), Common Ground on Common Core. Madison, Wisconsin: Resounding Books, 2014.

8. Essay review of Seven Myths about Education by Daisy Christodoulou, (London, UK: The Curriculum Centre, 2013). Journal of School Choice, 8, 3, 2014, 530-532.

9. Essay review of Finnish Lessons: What Can the World Learn from Educational Change in Finland by Pasi Sahlberg (NY: Teachers College Press, 2011). The Serpent in Finland’s Garden of Equity (March 2012). Policy Brief. Boston: Pioneer Institute. http://pioneerinstitute.org/pdf/120305_Finland_Stotsky.pdf

10. Stotsky, S. (2013). Literature or Technical Manuals: Who Should Be Teaching What, Where, and Why? Nonpartisan Education Review / Essays, 9(1).

11. Stotsky, S, et al. (2016). Michigan Senate Bill 826: Replace Common Core with pre-2011 Massachusetts Standards. Nonpartisan Education Review/Resources, 12(2).

12. Stotsky, S. (2017). Summary of and Comments on the Middle School Mathematics Initiative, Nonpartisan Education Review / Resources.

13. Stotsky, S. (2018). Is Common Core Racist? Check Out the Results, Nonpartisan Education Review / Essays.

14. Stotsky, S. (2018). Who watches the watchmen? Transparency might guard the integrity of the tests given by the National Assessment of Educational Progress, Nonpartisan Education Review / Essays.

15. Stotsky, S. (2019). How to Honor the English Curriculum and the Study of U.S. History: A Response to Concerns Expressed by Teachers at a California Conference, Nonpartisan Education Review / Resources.

16. Stotsky, S. (2019). How to become Secretary of Education without really doing anything, Nonpartisan Education Review / Reviews.

17. Stotsky, S. (2019). Why Were my Last Four Books Necessary?, Nonpartisan Education Review / Essays.

18. Stotsky, S. (2020). How to Clean Up the Common Core Mess in Massachusetts, Nonpartisan Education Review / Resources.

19. Here’s how Idaho can develop academically strong ELA and Mathematics Standards when it revises its current standards.

20. WHY AMERICAN STUDENTS DO NOT LEARN TO READ VERY WELL: THE UNINTENDED CONSEQUENCES OF TITLE II AND TEACHER TESTING

21. School-Related Influences on Grade 8 Mathematics Performance in Massachusetts

22. Stotsky, S., & Holzman, T. (2015). The Costs of Federal Intervention in Local Education: The Effectiveness of America’s Choice in Arkansas. Nonpartisan Education Review/Articles, 11(2).

23. Sandra Stotsky, An English Language Arts Curriculum Framework for American Public Schools: A Model, February 2013

Other

Sandra Stotsky, R. James Milgram, Ze'ev Wurman, Williamson M. Evers, Robert S. Eitel, Kent D. Talbert, Richard P. Phelps, Anthony Esolen, Ralph Ketcham, Mark Bauerlein. (2015, September). Drilling through the Core. Boston: Pioneer Institute. https://pioneerinstitute.org/drilling-through-the-core/

McQuillan, M., Phelps, R. P., & Stotsky, S. (2015, October). How PARCC’s false rigor stunts the growth of all students. Boston: Pioneer Institute. https://pioneerinstitute.org/news/testing-the-tests-why-mcas-is-better-than-parcc/

Phelps, R. P. (2021, Summer). In Defense of Sandra Stotsky, Book Reviews. Academic Questions, 34(2). https://www.nas.org/academic-questions/34/2/in-defense-of-sandra-stotsky

== Personal life ==
Stotsky is the mother of five children, and has 12 grandchildren; she is Jewish.
