= Sandra Johann =

German politician (born 1985)

Member of the Landtag of Saarland
- Incumbent
- Assumed office 14 September 2022
- Preceded by: Tanja Pavel
- In office 13 May 2020 – 25 April 2022
- Preceded by: Ruth Meyer

Personal details
- Born: 2 November 1985 (age 40)
- Party: Christian Democratic Union (since 2010)

Sandra Johann (born 2 November 1985) is a German politician. She has been a member of the Landtag of Saarland since 2022, having previously served from 2020 to 2022. She has served as chairwoman of the Frauen-Union in Neunkirchen since 2021.
