= Esporte Clube Poções =

Poções
- Full name: Esporte Clube Poções
- Nickname(s): Raposa do Agreste
- Founded: January 8, 1985
- Ground: Heraldão, Poções, Bahia state, Brazil
- Capacity: 8,000
Home colours	Away colours	Third colours

Esporte Clube Poções, commonly known as Poções, is a Brazilian football club from Poções, Bahia state. They competed in the Série C and in the Copa do Brasil once.

== History ==
The club was founded on July 22, 1985. They won the Campeonato Baiano Second Level in 1993. The club competed in the Copa do Brasil in 2000, when they were eliminated in the Second Round by Cortiiba, and competed in the Série C in 2007, when they were eliminated in the First Stage of the competition.

== Achievements ==
- Campeonato Baiano Second Level:
  - Winners (1): 1993

== Stadium ==
Esporte Clube Poções play their home games at Estádio Heraldo Curvelo, nicknamed Heraldão. The stadium has a maximum capacity of 8,000 people.
