= Taílson (footballer, born 1975) =

Brazilian footballer

Personal information
- Full name: José Ilson dos Santos
- Date of birth: 28 November 1975 (age 50)
- Place of birth: Nossa Senhora da Glória, Brazil
- Height: 1.79 m (5 ft 10 1/2 in)
- Position: Striker

Team information
- Current team: Sociedade Esportiva River Plate

Senior career*
Years	Team	Apps	(Gls)
1993–1995	Bahia		
1995–1996	XV Novembro-Piracicaba		
1996–1998	Matonense		
1998	Grêmio Esportivo Brasil		
1998	Botafogo-SP		
1999	Gamba Osaka	14	(3)
2000	Sport Recife		
2001–2002	Botafogo		
2002–2003	Braga		
2003	Juventude		
2003	Paulista		
2003–2005	Lokeren	44	(18)
2005–2006	Mouscron	15	(5)
2006	Shenyang Ginde	12	(2)
2006	Lierse	0	(0)
2007	Braga		
2007–2008	Atlético Paranaense		
2008	Fortaleza		
2008	Confiança		
2009	América-MG		
2009	Tombense Futebol Clube		
2010	XV Novembro-Piracicaba		
2010–	Sociedade Esportiva River Plate		
- * Club domestic league appearances and goals

José Ilson dos Santos also known as Taílson (born 28 November 1975) is a Brazilian football player.

== Club statistics ==
Club performance			League		Cup		League Cup		Total	
Season	Club	League	Apps	Goals	Apps	Goals	Apps	Goals	Apps	Goals
Japan			League		Emperor's Cup		J.League Cup		Total	
1999	Gamba Osaka	J1 League	14	3	1	0	0	0	15	3
Total			14	3	1	0	0	0	15	3
