= Corsi Sandro =

Italian electrical engineer

Corsi Sandro from the CESI SpA, Castellanza, Varese, Italy was named Fellow of the Institute of Electrical and Electronics Engineers (IEEE) in 2013 for contributions to wide-area voltage and reactive power regulation and protection.
