= Zander (disambiguation) =

The zander is a species of fish. Zander can also be a given name, a diminutive of the male given name Alexander, or a surname. It may refer to:

== People ==
=== Surname ===
- Zander (surname)

=== Given name ===
- Zander de Bruyn (born 1975), South African cricketer
- Zander Fagerson (born 1996), Scottish rugby union player
- Zander Hollander (1923–2014), American journalist
- Zander Horvath (born 1998), American football player
- Zander Mueth (born 2005), American baseball player
- Zander Schloss (born 1961), American musician, actor and composer
- Zander Sherman (born 1986), Canadian writer

=== Diminutive ===
- Alexander (Zander) Blewett III (born 1945), American lawyer
- Zander Diamond (born 1985), Scottish footballer
- Zander Lehmann (born 1987), television writer
- Zander Sutherland (born 1987), Scottish footballer
- Zander Wedderburn (1935–2017), British psychologist

== Fictional characters ==
- Alexander "Zander" Smith, in the soap opera General Hospital
- Zander, protagonist of the 1925 film Zander the Great
- Zander Freemaker, in the television series Lego Star Wars: The Freemaker Adventures
- Zander Rice, a Marvel Comics character

== Other uses ==
- Zander, Wisconsin, an unincorporated community
- Zander Insurance Group, an American insurance company
- Zander (album), a 1997 album by Scorn

== See also ==
- Alexander
- Sander (name)
- Xander
