= Sandra Funken =

German politician (born 1980)

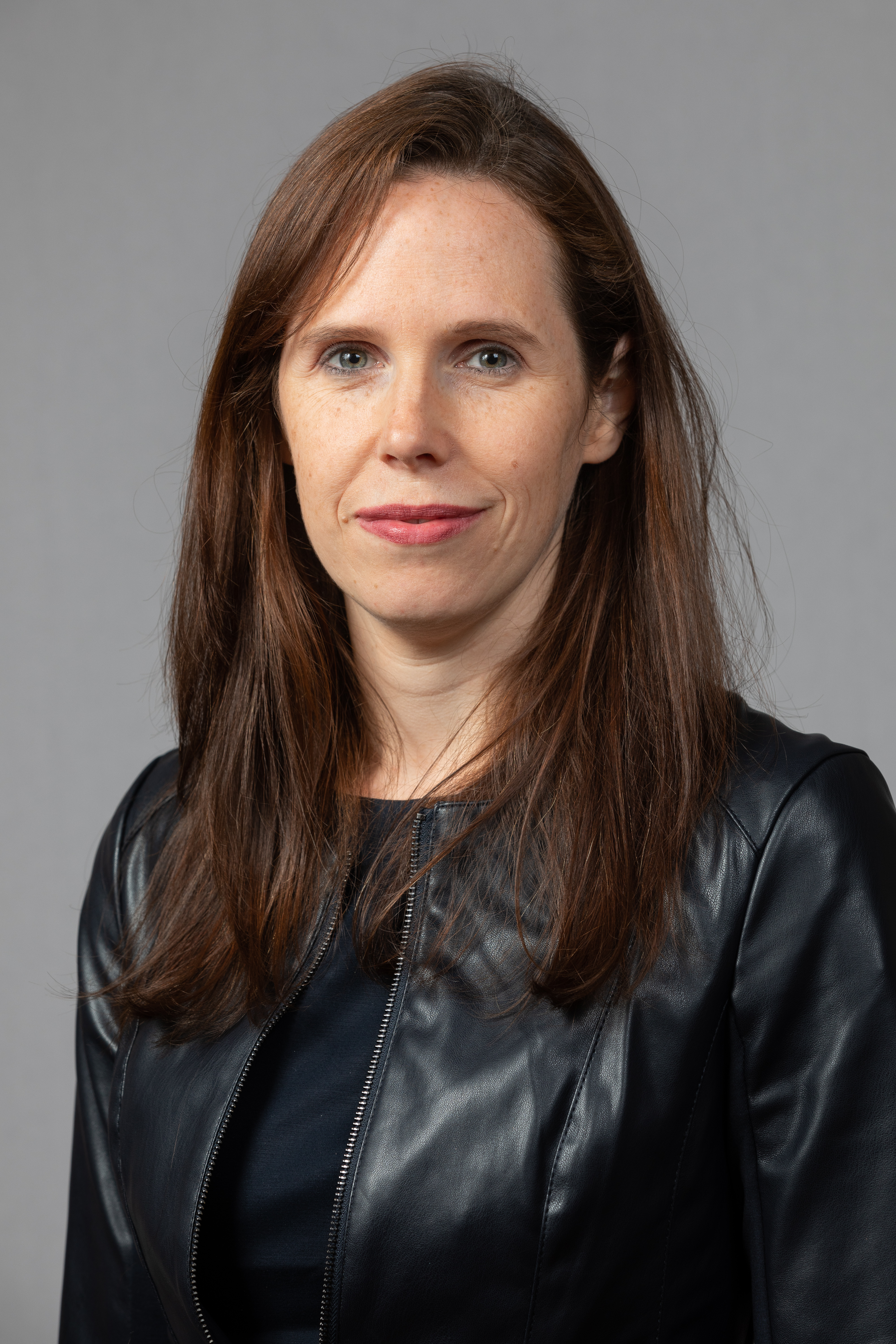
- Funken in 2019

Member of the Landtag of Hesse
- Incumbent
- Assumed office 18 January 2019
- Preceded by: Judith Lannert
- Constituency: Odenwald

Personal details
- Born: 15 October 1980 (age 46)
- Party: Christian Democratic Union (since 2009)

Sandra Funken (née Lewold; born 15 October 1980) is a German politician serving as a member of the Landtag of Hesse since 2019. She has served as chairwoman of the Health and Family Affairs Committee since 2024. From 2023 to 2024, she served as chairwoman of the Digital Affairs and Data Protection Committee.
