= Sandra Quackenbush =

American virologist

Sandra L. Quackenbush
- Education: Biology: Animal Science Nutrition, Ohio State University, 1979, Retroviral Pathogenesis, Colorado State University, 1987, Retroviral Pathogenesis, Colorado State University, 1994
- Alma mater: Ohio State University (BA) Colorado State University (MA), (Ph.D)
- Known for: Research of Walleye Dermal Sarcoma Virus and Feline Leukemia Virus
- Scientific career
- Fields: Biology, Virology
- Institutions: Colorado State University

Sandra L. Quackenbush is an American virologist working as the associate dean of academic and student affairs and professor of retrovirology at the Colorado State University College of Veterinary Medicine and Biomedical Science. Her research interests include viral pathogenesis, with emphasis in viral-induced oncogenesis.

== Education ==
Sandra Quackenbush received her bachelor's degree in animal science nutrition from Ohio State University in 1979, obtained her Masters in retroviral pathogenesis from Colorado State University in 1987 and her Ph.D. also in retroviral pathogenesis in 1994 from Colorado State University. She has had several articles published within her field of study.

== Research contributions ==
=== Summary of work ===
Quackenbush has worked with both gammaretrovirus (feline leukemia virus) and epsilonretrovirus (walleye dermal sarcoma virus) extensively. Gammaretroviruses are single stranded RNA viruses that are present in the genome of vertebrates including reptiles, birds, amphibians, and mammals. Epsilonretroviruses are viruses that infect fish, and have a single stranded RNA genome. Retroviruses within these genera cause disease by containing RNA sequences that code for proteins that promote oncogenesis which leads to sarcomas and leukemias. Through her work with two genera of retroviruses, Quackenbush determined mutations to Gammaretrovirus (feline leukemia virus) makes them less lethal, and Epsilretrovirus (walleye dermal sarcoma virus) contains sequences that encode for cyclin proteins, leading to the proliferation of normal cells and eventually giving a means for cancer cells to become abundant

=== Most notable work ===
Her most notable work focuses on feline leukemia virus. This report was published in Science in 1988 and has been cited over 200 times. The research found that replication-defective strains of feline leukemia virus can cause deadly immunodeficiency syndrome in felines. Results of the study revealed that a less fatal form of immunodeficiency syndrome could be induced with mutations to the feline leukemia virus.

Phylogeny of Retroviruses

=== Most recent publication ===
The most recent published study Quackenbush was involved in was the study of walleye dermal sarcoma virus. This research investigated the role of retroviral cyclin (RV-cyclin) in sarcoma progression in walleyes as a comparable study to human cancer. It was determined that the RV-cyclin bound to cyclin-dependent kinase 8 (CDK8) and increased its activity. The genes IEGs are normally stimulated for transcription by cyclin C with an up regulation in CDK8 IEGs are expressed at a higher rate for a period of time. Since IEGs encode for cell proliferation a mutation in the CDK8 could lead to dermal sarcoma. This investigation determined the mechanism behind retrovirus-induced oncogenesis caused by walleye dermal sarcoma virus. These implications would later be used to determine other retroviral-induced oncogenesis in human cancers.

=== Current research ===
Quackenbush has current laboratory research focusing on viral-induced oncogenesis, in fish retroviruses. Studies investigate how a virus (walleye dermal sarcoma virus) is involved in the introduction of sarcomas. Her lab is trying to determine the mode by which transcription, apoptosis, and transduction are controlled by viral regulatory proteins such as kinases. Studies focus on the walleye dermal sarcoma virus and inducing sarcomas.

== Publications ==
- The retroviral cyclin of walleye dermal sarcoma virus binds cylin-dependent kinases 3 and 8.
- Transgenic expression of walleye dermal sarcoma virus rv-cyclin (orf A) in Zebrafish does not result in tissue proliferation.
- Cancers induced by piscine retroviruses.
- Non-primate mammalian and fish retroviruses

== Honors ==
- Named an Outstanding Educator at the University of Kansas in 2001 by the Mortar Board

== See also ==
- Retroviruses
- Viral pathogenesis
- Oncogenesis
- Feline leukemia virus
- Walleye
- Sarcoma
