= Domenico Sandrini =

Italian cross-country skier, Nordic combined skier, and ski jumper

Domenico Sandrini (February 8, 1883, in Cercino – September 29, 1973, in Cercino) was an early Italian cross-country skier, Nordic combined skier, and ski jumper. He was a member of the Sci Club Ponte di Legno.

== Notable results ==
- 1914:
  - 1st, Italian championships of ski jumping
  - 1st, Italian championships of Nordic combined skiing
  - 2nd, Italian men's championships of cross-country skiing, 18 km
