= Beate Sander =

Canadian health economist

Beate Sander is a Canada Research Chair, a senior scientist at Toronto General Hospital, University Health Network, and an adjunct scientist at ICES, with a cross appointment as a professor at the Dalla Lana School of Public Health's Institute of Health Policy, Management and Evaluation, University of Toronto. Her research primarily focuses on infectious diseases and health economics interventions using population-based data and simulation modeling.

== Early life and education ==
Sander obtained a nursing degree from the Medizinische Fachschule Chemnitz and a Master of Business Administration from Technische Universität Bergakademie Freiberg, both in Germany. After obtaining a master's in economics of development (MEcDev) at the Australian National University, she proceeded to the Dalla Lana School of Public Health, University of Toronto, where she completed a PhD in Health Services Research.

== Career ==
Sander began her career as an assistant professor at the University of Toronto between 2011 and 2017 before becoming a full professor in 2022. Sander became an adjunct scientist at ICES, formerly Institute of Clinical Evaluative Sciences, in 2012. Having worked at the Toronto Health Economics and Technology Assessment Collaborative (THETA), she has served different roles, including an investigator, acting director, and a director of Health Modeling & Health Economics between 2017 and 2022. She is a director of Population Health Economics Research (PHER) at the Toronto General Hospital Research Institute. Sander also served as a scientific co-chair of Canadian Lyme Disease Research Group. Serving as the president of the Society of Medical Decision Making and an editorial board member of the Medical Decision Making journal. She also holds appointment as a scientist at Public Health Ontario and a faculty associate of the Canadian Centre for Health Economics.

== Awards ==
- Tier 1 Canada Research Chair in Economics of Infectious Diseases
- Thomas and Edna Naylor Memorial Award
- Louise Lemieux-Charles Health System Leadership Award
- Sanofi Pasteur Award for Communicable Disease Epidemiology
- Lee B. Lusted Student Prize
