= Sandrina Malakiano =

Indonesian news presenter

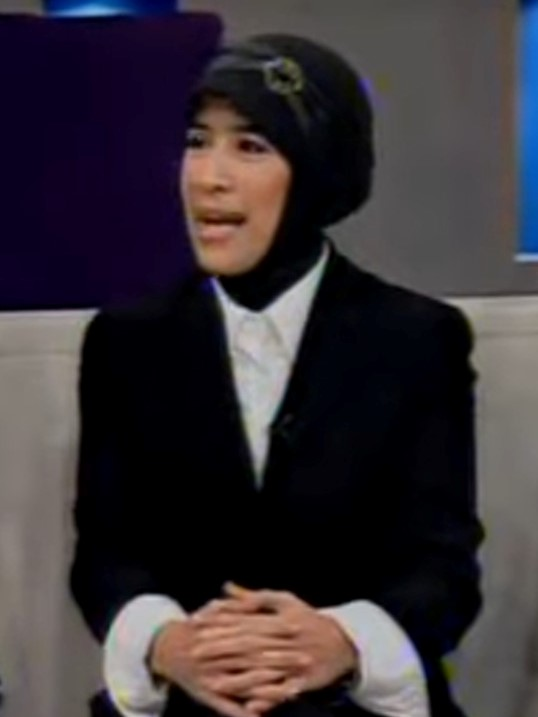
- Sandrina in 2011
- Born: November 24, 1971 (age 54); Bangkok, Thailand
- Occupation: News Presenter

Sandrina Malakiano (born Alessandra Shinta Malakiano 24 November 1971) is a former news presenter of Metro TV, an Indonesian news television channel. She was runner-up in the "Best News Presenter" category of the 2002 Asian Television Awards. Sandrina was named Best News Presenter in 2001 and 2003, and Best Current Affairs Presenter in the 2005 Asian Television Awards respectively.

== Career ==
Malakiano was born in Thailand but was raised in Bali. She graduated from university as a Civil Engineer. She started her career in the broadcasting world in Bali when she became a radio show host in 1990 and after a few months she joined TVRI station of Denpasar Bali as a newscaster. In 1996, she joined ANTV Jakarta as a newscaster and sportscaster. Then, in 1997, she worked as a freelance host for several TV programs, such as Travel Asia and Beyond and 'Wild Things.

From 1998 to 2000, she worked as Public Relations Manager of PT. Sido Muncul (a notable Indonesian herbal medicine company) whilst working as English News Presenter and Sportscaster at TVRI Central Station in Jakarta.

Malakiano's father is an Italian Christian while her mother was a Javanese Muslim. She converted to Islam in 2000.

In 2000 Malakiano joined Metro TV, the first 24-hour news channel in Indonesia, as the station's main news and current affairs anchor. Right after she went on the Hajj pilgrimage in 2006, Sandrina decided to wear the veil (hijab), hence she was unable to further pursue her career there as wearing hijab was against the company's 'On Air Look' policy for news anchors.

Since October 2009, with her husband, political analyst Eep Saefulloh Fatah, Malakiano has run a political marketing consultancy company under the name PolMark Indonesia Inc. Malakiano and her husband also own and manage two cafes/restaurants in Jakarta, named 'Abuella'.

Malakiano teaches Broadcast Journalism and Public Speaking. She hosts programs on a freelance basis.

== Social activism ==
As Ambassador for the National Campaign to Fight Cervical Cancer, for the last decade Malakiano has continuously promoted and educated the public about Cervical Cancer Prevention in Indonesia. She is also involved in many different forms of social activities, such as in the field of education.
