= Rafael Jaques =

Brazilian footballer

Personal information
- Full name: Rafael Jaques
- Date of birth: 11 September 1975 (age 51)
- Place of birth: Porto Alegre, Brazil
- Height: 1.78 m (5 ft 10 in)
- Position: Striker

Youth career
- Grêmio

Senior career*
Years	Team	Apps	(Gls)
1994–1998	Grêmio	8	(1)
1996	→ Araçatuba (loan)		
1996	→ Goiás (loan)	17	(3)
1998–2001	Betis	4	(1)
1999	→ Rayo Vallecano (loan)	5	(0)
1999	→ São Paulo (loan)	6	(0)
2000	→ Sport (loan)	0	(0)
2000	→ Guarani (loan)	14	(2)
2001	→ Sport (loan)	0	(0)
2001–2002	União de Leiria	27	(10)
2002–2003	Marítimo	17	(1)
2003	CFZ-DF		
2004	Vila Nova		
2005	15 de Novembro		
2005	Santo André		
2005–2006	Wuhan Guanggu	12	(0)
2007–2008	Canoas		
2008–2009	APOP	8	(0)
2010	Sampaio Corrêa	2	(0)
2011	Gama		

Managerial career
- 2018–2019: São José-RS
- 2020: Remo
- 2021: Pelotas
- 2021: Caxias
- 2022–2023: Sergipe
- 2023–2024: Águia de Marabá
- * Club domestic league appearances and goals

Rafael Jaques (born 11 September 1975) is a Brazilian football coach and former player who played as a striker.

== Career ==
Born in Porto Alegre, Jaques played for several different clubs of which they include Grêmio, Araçatuba, Goiás, Real Betis, Rayo Vallecano, São Paulo, Sport, União de Leiria, Marítimo, CFZ de Brasília, Vila Nova, 15 de Novembro, Santo André, Wuhan Guanggu, Canoas, APOP and Sampaio Corrêa he made his debut as a coach, for the São José de Porto Alegre, leading this team in the Série C.
