= Sandra Andersson =

Swedish football midfielder

Personal information
- Full name: Sandra Andersson
- Date of birth: 31 December 1989 (age 36)
- Place of birth: Sweden
- Position: Midfielder

Team information
- Current team: Mallbackens IF
- Number: 18

Senior career*
Years	Team	Apps	(Gls)
2011–	Mallbackens IF	75	(3)
- * Club domestic league appearances and goals as of 7 September 2016

Sandra Andersson (born 31 December 1989) is a Swedish football midfielder who plays for Mallbackens IF.
