= Sandra Weegels =

German politician (born 1981)

Member of the Landtag of Hesse
- Incumbent
- Assumed office 18 January 2024

Personal details
- Born: 4 February 1981 (age 45)
- Party: Alternative for Germany (since 2013)

Sandra Weegels (born 4 February 1981) is a German politician serving as a member of the Landtag of Hesse since 2024. From 2019 to 2023, she served as group leader of the Alternative for Germany in the city council of Giessen.
