= Sander (name) =

The masculine given name Sander is a variant of Alexander, used in the Dutch-speaking parts of Europe (the Netherlands and Belgium), as well as Norway and Estonia. As of 1 January 2021, it is the 34th most common masculine given name in Estonia. The feminine version Sandra is more internationally widespread; there is another masculine version in some countries: Sandro.

== Given name ==
- Sander Armée (born 1985), Belgian cyclist
- Sander Baart (born 1988), Dutch field hockey player and Olympic competitor
- Sander Berge (born 1998), Norwegian footballer
- Sander Berk (born 1979), Dutch triathlete and Olympic competitor
- Sander Boschker (born 1970), Dutch footballer
- Sander Coopman (born 1995), Belgian footballer
- Sander Cordeel (born 1987), Belgian road bicycle racer
- Sander Debroux (born 1982), Belgian footballer
- Sander Dekker (born 1975), Dutch politician
- Sander Dreesmann (born 1977), Dutch field hockey player
- Sander Duits (born 1983), Dutch footballer
- Sander Fischer (born 1988), Dutch footballer
- Sander Moen Foss (born 1998), Norwegian footballer
- Sander Gilman (born 1944), American cultural and literary historian
- Sander Gommans (born 1978), Dutch heavy metal singer and musician
- Sander de Graaf (born 1995), Dutch rower and Olympic competitor
- Sander Griffioen (born 1941), Dutch philosopher and educator
- Sander Groen (born 1968), Dutch tennis player
- Sander Heesakkers (born 1995), Dutch footballer
- Sander Helven (born 1990), Belgian cyclist
- Sander Kartum (born 1995), Norwegian footballer
- Sander Kleinenberg (born 1971), Dutch DJ and record producer
- Sander Jan Klerk (born 1982), Dutch actor and singer
- Sander Lantinga (born 1976), Dutch radio personality
- Sander Levin (born 1931), American politician
- Sander MacKilljan, Dutch mixed martial artist
- Sander Sandy Nelson (1938–2022), American rock and roll drummer
- Sander Pärn (born 1992), Estonian rally driver
- Sander Post (born 1984), Estonian footballer
- Sander Puri (born 1988), Estonian footballer
- Sander Raieste (born 1999), Estonian basketball player
- Sander de Rouwe (born 1980), Dutch politician
- Sander Rozema (born 1987), Dutch footballer
- Sander Rue (born 1948), American politician
- Sander Sagosen (born 1995), Norwegian handball player
- Sander Schnitger (1958–2020) Dutch general in the Royal Netherlands Air Force
- Sander Schwartz (born 1954), American television animation producer
- Sander Schutgens (born 1975) Dutch runner
- Sander Skogli (born 1993), Norwegian ice hockey player
- Sander Steen (born 1986), American rock drummer
- Sander Svendsen (born 1997), Norwegian footballer
- Sander Tangvik (born 2002), Norwegian footballer
- Sander Thoenes (1968–1999), Dutch journalist
- Sander Thonhauser, Dutch mixed martial artist
- Sander Tovstik (born 2006), Estonian footballer
- Sander van der Linden (born 1986), Social psychologist
- Sander van de Streek (born 1993), Dutch footballer
- Sander van der Weide (born 1976), Dutch field hockey player and Olympic medalist
- Sander van Doorn (born 1979), Dutch electronic musician & DJ
- Sander van Gessel (born 1976), Dutch footballer
- Sander Vanocur (1928–2019), American journalist
- Siim-Sander Vene (born 1990), Estonian basketball player
- Sander Vos (born 1967), Dutch film editor
- Sander Westerveld (born 1974), Dutch footballer
- Sander de Wijn (born 1990), Dutch field hockey player and Olympic competitor
- Sander P. Zwegers (born 1975), Dutch mathematician

== Surname ==
- Sander (surname)

== Fictional characters ==
- Sander Cohen is a character in the 2007 video game BioShock.
- Sander Driesen is a character in the Belgian series WTFock.

== See also ==
- Sandra (given name)
- Xander
- Xandra (disambiguation)
- Sanders (surname)
- Alexander
