= Sandra Beckerman =

Dutch politician (born 1983)

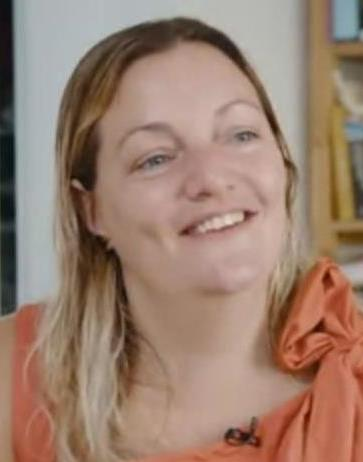
Sandra Beckerman in 2017.

Sandra Mariët Beckerman (born 31 March 1983) is a Dutch politician of the Socialist Party.

== Early life ==
She was born in Veenendaal. Beckerman is a PhD archaeologist, specialised in ceramic analysis, and studied and worked at the University of Groningen.

== Political career ==
Beckerman was a member of the Provincial Council of Groningen from 2007 to 2017.

She was elected to the House of Representatives in the 2017 general election. She was re-elected in 2021 and 2023. Since the latter election, Beckerman has served as the Socialist Party's spokesperson for housing, economy, agriculture, gas extraction, climate, education, and culture.

== Electoral history ==
Electoral history of Sandra Beckerman
Year	Body	Party	Pos.	Votes	Result		Ref.
Year	Body	Party	Pos.	Votes	Party seats	Individual	Ref.
2017	House of Representatives	Socialist Party	6	15,575	14	Won	
2021	House of Representatives	Socialist Party	6	11,049	9	Won	
2023	House of Representatives	Socialist Party	2	15,988	5	Won	
2025	House of Representatives	Socialist Party	2	36,765	3	Won	
