= Bertha Sander =

German interior designer (1901–1990)

Bertha Regina Sander (* March 7, 1901 in Cologne; † July 23, 1990 in Bodiam near Robertsbridge, East Sussex, England) was a German interior designer persecuted by the Nazis because she was Jewish. Sander left Germany in 1936 and lived in England until her death. Sander was one of the few women who worked as a (garden) architect, interior designer or craftswoman before 1945.

== Biography ==
=== Early life and education ===
Bertha Sander was the daughter of lawyer Justizrat Gustav Sander, originally from Erpel, and his cousin Klara (née Loeser). Sander's parents married in 1897 in the old synagogue in Liège. Sander had a brother, Otto (1898-1924), and a sister, Gabriele, a concert singer and music teacher who married lawyer Walter Speyer in the mid-1920s. Both siblings lived in Cologne in 1938, when all trace of them was lost.

Sander's mother, Klara, studied music and was a social reformer and publisher of the women's magazine "Neue Frauenkleidung und Frauenkultur" (New Women's Clothing and Women's Culture) together with musician and piano teacher Else Wirminghaus, née Strackerjan (1867-1939). Published in 29 issues from 1905 to 1932/1933, it was the organ of the "Association for German Women's Clothing and Women's Culture".

Klara Sander and Else Wirminghaus met during piano lessons that the latter gave Bertha and Gabriele Sander. Through this connection, Bertha Sander also met Helmuth Wirminghaus, the Wirminghaus son, ten years her senior, who, after beginning to study philosophy and art history, eventually studied architecture in Munich and Aachen and, from 1922, maintained a successful studio in Cologne. .: 356

Until 1917, Bertha Sander attended the Höhere Töchterschule in St.-Apern-Strasse in Cologne. In the year of the Werkbund exhibition (1914), she received lessons twice a week in the student class of the "School of Arts and Crafts" led by Emil Thormählen. Josef Hoffmann's former assistant, Philipp Häusler, also taught there. Afterwards, with the aim of becoming an interior designer, she completed a carpentry apprenticeship from 1918/1919 with the master carpenter Heinrich Adam Nix, who ran "workshops for elegant home furnishings, art furniture and the entire interior design" in Cologne. At the same time, she took classes in drawing at the "Kunstgewerbe- und Handwerkerschule" in the evenings. Upon completion of her training, she initially joined Häusler's studio in January 1920 as a draftswoman for furniture and home furnishings, but fell ill with tuberculosis in May while Häusler was moving to Vienna. After her recovery, she joined Bruno Paul's newly founded Cologne studio in May 1921 as an assistant for interior design and furniture design. Bruno Paul, who worked in association with his brother-in-law Franz Weber, was at that time involved in the design work for three villas: for Otto Kaufmann (Bayenthal), for Max Philipp (Lindenthal) and for Karl Grosse (Deutz).

After Paul had to dismiss her in November 1922 due to a lack of orders, Bertha Sander went to Berlin in February 1923, where she took up a position as a draftswoman in the local branch of Paul Schultze-Naumburg's Saalecker Werkstätten. In 1923/1924 she was finally in Vienna, as an independent colorist and draftswoman in the textile department of the Wiener Werkstätte, where she was primarily concerned with textile design. Dagobert Peche, whom she presumably met through Häusler in 1921 and who also lived in Sander's parents' house in Lindenthal during work stays in Cologne, also lived in Vienna: 357 According to her own memoirs, Bertha Sander was considered the "most talented young interior designer in Germany.": 356 f.

=== 1924 to 1935 ===
After returning to Cologne, Bertha Sander set up her own office as an interior designer in her parents' house in Lindenthal in February 1924. In addition, she taught the student class at the "Kunstgewerbe- und Handwerkerschule der Stadt Köln" (School of Arts and Crafts of the City of Cologne), which was headed by Martin Elsaesser at the time. However, the increasing number of private commissions forced her to give up her teaching activities. She designed the interiors for libraries, children's rooms and single-person apartments, including the furniture, fabrics and wallpaper. At times she employed as many as four carpenters, a decorator, and a painter at the same time to do the practical work. During this phase, she published essays on modern home decor in various professional publications, such as the monthly magazine "The woman and her house".

However, her successful start came to a temporary end in 1927 when tuberculosis broke out again, this time dramatically. She spent the following three years in clinics in Arosa and Davos to heal. Thanks to her good connections, however, she quickly received commissions again from the upper classes of Cologne after her return home. She designed the costumes for a performance of Paul Hindemith's "Wir bauen eine Stadt" ("We are building a city"), which took place under the overall direction of Else Thalheimer in the house of the "Bürgergesellschaft" during Hanukkah month in 1934.

== Nazi era (1933-1945) ==
After the National Socialists came to power, Sander was persecuted due to her Jewish heritage. After 1934, she was only allowed to work for Jewish clients, and she now only advertised under "Bertha Sander (Wohnungsberatung)" in Greven's address book of 1935. In the same year, she also received her last major commission, the redesign of the private rooms in the Jewish hospital in Ehrenfeld, with whose director, Benjamin Auerbach, the Sander family had a close friendship. Soon after, Bertha Sander emigrated to England with her mother: 357 f.

=== 1936 to 1990 ===
Bertha Sander and her mother Klara left Cologne in January 1936 via Monaco to England via Monaco, where Klara's sister Pauline Straus († June 1936 Monaco) lived. There they were initially supported by acquaintances of her mother, whom she had met during a longer stay in England around 1895. Bertha was unable to work in her profession as in general foreigners were largely prohibited from working permanently. Bertha took on various unskilled jobs, including as a bookkeeper in small factories, as a flower seller or as an employee of a bookbinder. Klara and Bertha purchased a house in the London suburb of Hampstead. However war was declared, as "enemy foreigners" they were forced to borrow against the house.

Bertha Sander kept in touch by letter with former Cologne companions, such as the Cologne artist Joseph Fassbender (1903-1974), who had been a British prisoner of war, or soon after the end of the war in 1945 with her former teacher Philipp Häusler. But her hopes for a new professional start after 1945 remained unfulfilled. Bertha Sander, who remained unmarried throughout her life, died in a nursing home in the English county of East Sussex.

Parts of her estate are in the NS-Documentation Center of the City of Cologne, but essentially since 1986 or 1988 in London's Victoria and Albert Museum, such as documents and drafts from the years 1917 to 1936 and a series of paintings from the years around 1963.: 359

Rückblickend muss ich feststellen, dass ich durch die unglücklichen Entwicklungen seit 1933 schuldlos aus meiner beruflichen Laufbahn geworfen wurde und die daraus gefolgten schweren Schädigungen mir jede Hoffnung nehmen, jemals wieder das zu werden, was ich vor 1933 war.

— Bertha Sander, 1954,

In honor of Bertha Sander, the NS Documentation Center of the City of Cologne showed the exhibition "A Whole Life in a Hatbox" from November 8, 2013, to March 9, 2014.

== Works ==
=== As an interior designer ===
- 1934–1935: Köln-Ehrenfeld, Israelitisches Asyl, Neugestaltung der Zimmer für Privatpatienten

=== Writings (selection) ===
As a rule, Bertha Sander illustrated her publications with her own illustrations. The magazine Für unsere Kinder was published by her mother Klara Sander.

- Puppenstubentapete zum Durchzeichnen. In: Für unsere Kinder. 1. Jahrgang 1924, Heft 2, G. Braun, Karlsruhe 1924, S. 37–39.
- Kinderspiel- und Arbeitstisch. In: Für unsere Kinder. 2. Jahrgang 1924, Heft 1, G. Braun, Karlsruhe 1925, S. 13 und 22.
- Von Beleuchtung und Beleuchtungskörpern. In: Samenkörner. Illustrierte Monatszeitschrift für Volkswohlfahrt. Hrsg. Verband Schweizer Konsumvereine, Ausgabe November 1925, Basel 1925, S. 164 f.
- Unmoderne Möbel in modernen Wohnungen und wie man die Möbel umändern kann. In: Deutsche Frauenzeitung. 39. Jahrgang 1925/26, Heft 40, Verlag Otto Beyer, Leipzig 1925, S. 18 f.
- Praktische Kindermöbel. In: Die Frau und ihr Haus. Zeitschrift für Kleidung, Gesundheit, Körperpflege und Wohnungsfragen. 7. Jahrgang 1926, Heft 3 vom December 1926, Berlin 1926.
- Über zeitgemäße Möbel. In: Kölner Baugenossenschaftsblatt. 2. Jahrgang 1927, S. 80 ff.
- Das Sprech- und Wohnzimmer eines Arztes von Bertha Sander, Köln. In: Die Frau und ihr Haus. Zeitschrift für Kleidung, Gesundheit, Körperpflege und Wohnungsfragen. Heft 7 vom July 1933, Berlin 1933.

== Honors ==
By resolution of the Ehrenfeld district council of November 28, 2016, a planned street ) in the Cologne Industrial and Media Park Ossendorf was named after Bertha Sander.

== Literature ==
- Barbara Becker-Jákli: Das jüdische Krankenhaus in Köln. Die Geschichte des Israelitischen Asyls für Kranke und Altersschwache 1869–1945. (= Schriften des NS-Dokumentationszentrum der Stadt Köln, Band 11.) Emons Verlag, Köln 2004, ISBN 3-89705-350-0, S. 278 und 471.
- Wolfram Hagspiel: Köln und seine jüdischen Architekten. J.P. Bachem Verlag, Köln 2010, ISBN 978-3-7616-2294-0, S. 355–360.
- Ulla Rogalski: Ein ganzes Leben in einer Hutschachtel. Geschichten aus dem Leben der jüdischen Innenarchitektin Bertha Sander 1901–1990. Marta Press, 2. Aufl. Hamburg 2014, ISBN 978-3-944442-13-6.

== Links ==
- "Köln und seine jüdischen Architekten" auf koelnarchitektur.de retrieved 17 February 2013.
- "Weitere Teile des Nachlasses von Bertha Sander aufgetaucht" auf unserort.de, 20. August 2010 retrieved 17 February 2013.
- Bertha Sander im Bestand des Victoria and Albert Museum, London retrieved 17 February 2013.
- Verzeichnung des Nachlasses zu Inneneinrichtungen der Bertha Sander im Bestand des Victoria and Albert Museum, London retrieved 17 February 2013.
- Verzeichnung des Nachlasses zu Textilien der Bertha Sander im Bestand des Victoria and Albert Museum, London retrieved 17 February 2013.
- Bertha Sander in der Datensammlung "Frauen in der Architektur" auf www.kmkbuecholdt.de, retrieved 10 March 2013.
