= 2000 Copa do Brasil =

Copa do Brasil 2000

Tournament details
- Country: Brazil
- Dates: March 9 - July 9
- Teams: 69

Final positions
- Champions: Cruzeiro (MG)
- Runners-up: São Paulo (SP)

Tournament statistics
- Matches played: 129
- Goals scored: 386 (2.99 per match)
- Top goal scorer: Oséas (10)

The Copa do Brasil 2000 was the 12th staging of the Copa do Brasil.

The competition started on March 9, 2000, and concluded on July 9, 2000, with the second leg of the final, held at the Mineirão stadium in Belo Horizonte, in which Cruzeiro lifted the trophy for the third time with a 2-1 victory over São Paulo.

Oséas, of Cruzeiro, with 10 goals, was the competition's top scorer.

== Format ==
69 clubs disputed the competition in a knock-out format where all rounds were played over two legs, and the away goals rule was used, but in the first two rounds if the away team won the first leg with an advantage of at least two goals, the second leg was not played. The club automatically qualified to the next round.

== Participating teams ==
- 4 de Julho (PI)
- ABC (RN)
- América (MG)
- América (RN)
- Americano (RJ)
- Atlético (MG)
- Atlético (PR)
- Avaí (SC)
- Bahia (BA)
- Baré (RR)
- Botafogo (PB)
- Botafogo (SP)
- Botafogo (RJ)
- Caxias (RS)
- Ceará (CE)
- Comercial (MS)
- Confiança (SE)

- Corinthians (SP)
- Coritiba (PR)
- CRB (AL)
- Cruzeiro (MG)
- CSA (AL)
- Dom Pedro II (DF)
- Figueirense (SC)
- Flamengo (RJ)
- Fluminense (RJ)
- Fortaleza (CE)
- Gama (DF)
- Goiás (GO)
- Grêmio (RS)
- Guarani (SP)
- Independência (AC)
- Internacional (RS)
- Interporto (TO)

- Ji-Paraná (RO)
- Juventude (RS)
- Maranhão (MA)
- Nacional (AM)
- Náutico (PE)
- Palmeiras (SP)
- Paraná (PR)
- Paysandu (PA)
- Pinheiros (RO)
- Poções (BA)
- Ponte Preta (SP)
- Portuguesa (SP)
- Remo (PA)
- Rio Branco (ES)
- Rio Negro (MA)
- River (PI)
- Sampaio Corrêa (MA)

- Santa Cruz (PE)
- Santos (AP)
- Santos (SP)
- São Paulo (SP)
- São Raimundo (AM)
- Sergipe (SE)
- Serra (ES)
- Sinop (MT)
- Sport (PE)
- Treze (PB)
- Ubiratan (MS)
- União (MT)
- URT (MG)
- Vasco (AC)
- Vasco (RJ)
- Vila Nova (GO)
- Vitória (BA)
- Ypiranga (AP)

== Competition stages ==
=== First round ===
Team 1	Agg.	Team 2	1st leg	2nd leg
Ypiranga (AP)	1-3	São Raimundo (AM)	0-0	1-3
Independência (AC)	2-1	Baré (RR)	1-0	1-1
Interporto (TO)	0-8	Bahia (BA)	0-8	-
Ji-Paraná (RO)	4-2	Vasco (AC)	2-1	2-1
Paysandu (PA)	1-2	Maranhão (MA)	0-1	1-1
4 de Julho (PI)	3-5	Fortaleza (CE)	2-1	1-3
URT (MG)	1-3	Fluminense (RJ)	1-1	0-3
CRB (AL)	1-2	Santa Cruz (PE)	0-1	1-1
Santos (AP)	0-6	Remo (PA)	0-0	0-6
Nacional (AM)	2-2	Rio Negro (AM)	1-1	1-1 (pen: 4-2
Sampaio Corrêa (MA)	1-1	Ceará (CE)	0-0	1-1
América (RN)	4-2	Sport (PE)	0-1	1-0 (pen: 4-2)
Treze (PB)	1-3	ABC (RN)	0-1	1-2
Pinheiros (RO)	0-2	Vitória (BA)	0-2	-
Náutico (PE)	3-1	CSA (AL)	2-1	1-0
Confiança (SE)	0-5	Goiás (GO)	0-1	0-4
Sergipe (SE)	3-2	Vila Nova (GO)	3-2	0-0
Caxias (RS)	4-2	Avaí (SC)	1-1	3-1
Americano (RJ)	2-3	Paraná (PR)	1-1	1-2
Gama (DF)	1-5	Cruzeiro (MG)	1-1	1-4

=== Second round ===
Team 1	Agg.	Team 2	1st leg	2nd leg
River (PI)	1-2	Flamengo (RJ)	1-1	0-1
Figueirense (SC)	1-4	Guarani (SP)	1-1	0-3
Botafogo (PB)	1-3	Vasco (RJ)	1-3	-
Dom Pedro II (DF)	1-6	Ponte Preta (SP)	1-2	0-4
Commercial (MS)	2-5	São Paulo (SP)	2-1	0-3
Ubiratan (MS)	1-6	Sinop (MT)	1-1	0-5
América (MG)	5-6	Portuguesa (SP)	3-2	2-4
União (MT)	0-4	Grêmio (RS)	0-4	-
Poções (BA)	1-5	Coritiba (PR)	1-5	-
Serra (ES)	0-3	Santos (SP)	0-3	-
Botafogo (SP)	2-4	Internacional (RS)	2-1	0-3
Rio Branco (ES)	1-6	Botafogo (RJ)	1-1	0-5
Independência (AC)	2-7	São Raimundo (AM)	1-1	1-6
Ji-Paraná (RO)	1-5	Bahia (BA)	1-0	0-5
Maranhão (MA)	2-1	Fortaleza (CE)	2-1	0-0
Santa Cruz (PE)	3-4	Fluminense (RJ)	1-1	2-3
Nacional (AM)	4-3	Remo (PA)	3-2	1-2
América (RN)	4-3	Sampaio Corrêa (MA))	2-1	2-2
ABC (RN)	3-1	Vitória (BA)	1-0	2-1
Náutico (PE)	2-2	Goiás (GO)	1-1	1-1 (pen: 4-5)
Caxias (RS)	2-2	Sergipe (SE)	1-0	1-2
Paraná (PR)	0-2	Cruzeiro (MG)	0-2	-

=== Third round ===
Team 1	Agg.	Team 2	1st leg	2nd leg
Guarani (SP)	3-5	Flamengo (RJ)	0-2	3-3
Vasco (RJ)	2-1	Ponte Preta (SP)	1-1	1-0
Sinop (MT)	0-6	São Paulo (SP)	0-4	0-2
Bahia (BA)	6-3	São Raimundo (AM)	5-0	1-3
Maranhão (MA)	1-7	Fluminense (RJ)	1-1	0-6
Remo (PA)	4-6	América (RN)	2-0	2-6
ABC (RN)	2-2	Goiás (GO)	1-1	1-1 (pen: 4-3)
Caxias (RS)	2-9	Cruzeiro (MG)	1-3	1-6
Portuguesa (SP)	4-1	Grêmio (RS)	0-0	4-1
Coritiba (PR)	1-2	Santos (SP)	0-1	1-1
Internacional (RS)	3-3	Botafogo (RJ)	2-2	1-1

=== Round of Sixteen ===
Team 1	Agg.	Team 2	1st leg	2nd leg
Botafogo (RJ)	3-1	Corinthians (SP)	1-0	3-1
Cruzeiro (MG)	4-3	Atlético (PR)	2-1	2-2
Bahia (BA)	2-4	Flamengo (RJ)	1-3	1-1
Juventude (RS)	1-6	Santos (SP)	1-3	0-3
ABC (RN)	4-4	Palmeiras (SP)	3-3	1-1
América (RN)	3-6	São Paulo (SP)	1-3	2-3
Fluminense (RJ)	3-3	Vasco (RJ)	1-1	2-3
Portuguesa (SP)	0-0	Atlético (MG)	0-0	0-0 (pen: 1-4

=== Quarterfinals ===
Team 1	Agg.	Team 2	1st leg	2nd leg
Cruzeiro (MG)	3-2	Botafogo (RJ)	3-2	0-0
Flamengo (RJ)	2-8	Santos (SP)	0-4	2-4
São Paulo (SP)	5-3	Palmeiras (SP)	2-1	3-2
Fluminense (RJ)	5-5	Atlético (MG)	3-3	2-2

=== Semifinals ===
Team 1	Agg.	Team 2	1st leg	2nd leg
Cruzeiro (MG)	4-2	Santos (SP)	2-0	2-2
São Paulo (SP)	6-3	Atlético (MG)	3-0	3-3

=== Final ===
Team 1	Agg.	Team 2	1st leg	2nd leg
São Paulo (SP)	1-2	Cruzeiro (MG)	0-0	1-2

Copa do Brasil
2000 Winners
Cruzeiro
Third Title
