= Zander Insurance Group =

American Insurance Agency

Zander Insurance
- Company type: Private
- Industry: Insurance
- Founded: 1927; 99 years ago
- Founder: Herman Zander
- Headquarters: Nashville, United States
- Area served: United States
- Services: Insurance agent
- Owner: 49% employee-owned
- Website: www.zanderins.com

Zander Insurance is an American insurance agency headquartered in Nashville, Tennessee. Zander shops rates across all lines of insurance, including: term life, disability, home and auto, long-term care, group benefits, business insurance, and more.

Zander has earned the business and endorsement of radio and television personalities including Dave Ramsey, Eddie George, and Tony Gaskins.

Zander is a fourth-generation family-and-employee-owned business. According to the company's website, Zander is 49% employee-owned company.

== History ==
Zander Insurance was founded in 1927 by Herman Zander. In 1929, Julian M. Zander incorporated the agency, maintaining an active role in the business until shortly before his death in 1983. In 1957, his son, Julian “Bud” Zander, joined the agency. In 1986, Jeffrey J. Zander the great-grandson of Herman Zander – joined the family business, and in 2013 became the company’s CEO.

In 2012, Zander partnered with Answer Financial Insurance to provide home and auto insurance across the United States.

== See also ==
- Dave Ramsey
- Answer Financial
