= Sandro Blum =

Brazilian footballer

Personal information
- Full name: Sandro Rogério Blum
- Date of birth: 3 July 1970 (age 56)
- Place of birth: Três de Maio, Brazil
- Position: Centre-back

Youth career
- Dínamo (Santa Rosa)

Senior career*
Years	Team	Apps	(Gls)
1991	Dínamo		
1992	Esportivo		
1993–1995	Juventude		
1996–1997	Palmeiras	81	(3)
1997–1998	Atlético Mineiro	46	(0)
1998	Juventude		
1999–2001	Sport Recife		
2002	Santa Cruz		
2003	Paraná		
2003	Vila Nova		
2003	Atlético Goianiense		
2004	Vila Nova		
2005–2006	Novo Hamburgo		
2007–2008	Aimoré		
2008	Inter de Santa Maria		
2008–2009	Novo Hamburgo		
- * Club domestic league appearances and goals as of 1 December 2023

Sandro Blum (born 3 July 1970), is a Brazilian former professional footballer who played as a centre-back.

== Career ==
Sandro Blum started his career at Dinamo-RS, when he was still serving in the Brazilian army, and later played for Juventude, Palmeiras and Atlético Mineiro, being champion in all of these clubs. He would still play for Sport among several other clubs. Currently works at SC Ivoti.

== Honours ==
Juventude

- Campeonato Brasileiro Série B: 1994

Palmeiras

- Campeonato Paulista: 1996

Atlético Mineiro

- Copa CONMEBOL: 1997

Sport

- Copa do Nordeste: 2000
