= Sandro Goiano (footballer, born 1978) =

Brazilian footballer

Personal information
- Full name: Sandro da Cunha Carneiro
- Date of birth: 24 May 1978 (age 48)
- Place of birth: João Pessoa, Brazil
- Position: Forward

Senior career*
Years	Team	Apps	(Gls)
1997–1998	União de Lamas		
2002	ASA		
2002	Botafogo-PB		
2002	Fortaleza		
2003	Marília		
2003	Fortaleza		
2004	CRAC		
2004	Cuiabá		
2005	Inhumas		
2006	Anapolina		
2007	Guaratinguetá		
2007	Atlético Sorocaba		
2008	Inhumas		
2009	Araguaína		
2009	Nacional-AM		
2009	Trindade		
2010	AA Goitauba		
2010	Aparecidense		
2010	América-SP		
2011	Aparecidense		
2011	Barretos		
2012	Goianésia		
2012	Unaí		
2012	Aparecida-GO		
2013	Unaí		
2013	Plácido de Castro		
2013	Parauapebas		
2014	Plácido de Castro		
2014	Rio Branco-AC		
2015	Princesa do Solimões		
2015	Atlético Acreano		
- * Club domestic league appearances and goals

Sandro da Cunha Carneiro (born 24 May 1978), better known as Sandro Goiano, is a Brazilian former professional footballer who played as a forward.

== Career ==
Born in João Pessoa (PB), but grew up in Goiás (the reason for the nickname), Goiano began his career at Vitória youth team, between 1994 and 1996. Afterwards, he had experience in Portuguese football. He returned to Brazil in 2002 to defend ASA. That was when he had the most memorable moment of his career. He scored the winning goal 1–0 in the first leg, and scored on the return, when ASA lost 2–1 against Palmeiras in 2002 Copa do Brasil, and advanced due to the away goal rule. At the time, he earned a salary of just R$7,000, but received a party from the mayor of the city of Arapiraca in gratitude.

He played for several teams, being part of the promoted squad of Fortaleza EC in 2002 Série B, champion in 2004 at CRAC, 2009 at Araguaína, and 2013 at Plácido de Castro. He ended his career in 2015, at Princesa do Solimões on the first half of the year, and playing for Atlético Acreano as his last club.

== Honours ==
CRAC

- Campeonato Goiano: 2004

Araguaína

- Campeonato Tocantinense: 2009

Aparecidense

- Campeonato Goiano Second Division: 2010

Plácido de Castro

- Campeonato Acreano: 2013
