= Sandra Payne (artist) =

American visual artist (1951–2021)

- Born: 1951; St. Louis, Missouri, U.S.
- Died: July 3, 2021 (aged 69–70); St. Louis, Missouri, U.S.
- Burial place: Calvary Cemetery, St. Louis, Missouri, U.S.
- Education: Washington University; University of South Florida; Long Island University
- Occupations: Visual artist, librarian
- Known for: Collagist, sculptor, conceptual artist

Sandra Payne (1951 – 2021) was an American visual artist. She is best known as a collagist, sculptor, conceptual artist, and had also worked as a librarian. Payne primarily had lived in New York City and St. Louis.

== Biography ==
Sandra Payne was born in 1951 in St. Louis, Missouri, into a black family. She attended Washington University in St. Louis (BFA degree); University of South Florida (MFA degree); and Long Island University (MLIS degree). In the 1970s, she was awarded study at the Whitney Museum Independent Study Program. For 30 years she worked as a librarian for the New York Public Library in New York City. She never married or had children.

In 1986, Payne had a solo exhibition at the "Just Above Midtown" gallery where she displayed sexual and nude drawings, this was the last exhibition before the black avant-garde gallery closed.

She died on July 3, 2021. Her artwork can be found in the museum collection at the Museum of Modern Art.

== Exhibitions ==
=== Solo exhibitions ===
- 1986, "Sandra Payne", solo exhibition, Just Above Midtown/Downtown Gallery, New York City, New York
- 1998, "Sandra Payne", solo exhibition, Mary Delahoyd Gallery, New York City, New York
- 2001, "Sandra Payne", solo exhibition, Mary Delahoyd Gallery, New York City, New York
- 2022, " A World of Shine", solo retrospective, projects+gallery, St. Louis, Missouri

=== Group exhibitions ===
- 1973, "Black Photographers", group exhibition, Columbia College Chicago, Chicago, Illinois
- 1981, "The Shaped Field: Eccentric Formats", group exhibition, Museum of Modern Art, New York City, New York
- 1981, "Cynthia Hawkins & Sandra Payne", two person exhibition, Just Above Midtown, New York City, New York
- 1981, "The Shaped Field: Eccentric Formats", group exhibition, MoMA PS1, Queens, New York City, New York
- 1983, "Consumer Beware", group exhibition, group exhibition, Women's Interart Center, New York City, New York
- 1986, "Progressions: A Cultural Legacy", group exhibition, Museum of Modern Art (and/or MoMA PS1), New York City, New York; sponsored by Women's Caucus for Art "as a tribute to black women pioneers in the visual arts and their many talented descendants"
- 1986, "Transitions: The Afro-American Artist", group exhibition, Bergen County Museum of Art and Science (now Bergen Museum of Art & Science), Paramus, New Jersey
- 1991, "Race and Culture", group exhibition, 494 Gallery and City College of New York, New York City, New York
- 2001, "All That Glitters", group exhibition, Pavel Zoubok Gallery, New York City, New York
- 2022–2023, "Just Above Midtown: Changing Spaces", group exhibition, Museum of Modern Art, New York City, New York

== See also ==
- Lester Julian Merriweather, another collagist
