= Sandra Hietel-Heuer =

German politician (born 1981)

Member of the Landtag of Saxony-Anhalt
- Incumbent
- Assumed office 6 July 2021
- Preceded by: Uwe Harms
- Constituency: Gardelegen-Klötze

Personal details
- Born: 28 August 1981 (age 44)
- Party: Christian Democratic Union (since 2007)

Sandra Hietel-Heuer (née Hietel; born 28 August 1981) is a German politician serving as a member of the Landtag of Saxony-Anhalt since 2021. From 2011 to 2021, she served as press secretary of the Christian Democratic Union group in the Landtag.
