= Sandra Masone =

American boom operator

Sandra Masone is a boom operator.

She was nominated for a Daytime Emmy for Outstanding Achievement in Live and Direct to Tape Sound Mixing for a Drama Series for her work as a boom operator on General Hospital.
