= Poções =

Municipality of Bahia, Brazil

Coordinates: 14°31′S 40°21′W

- Municipality
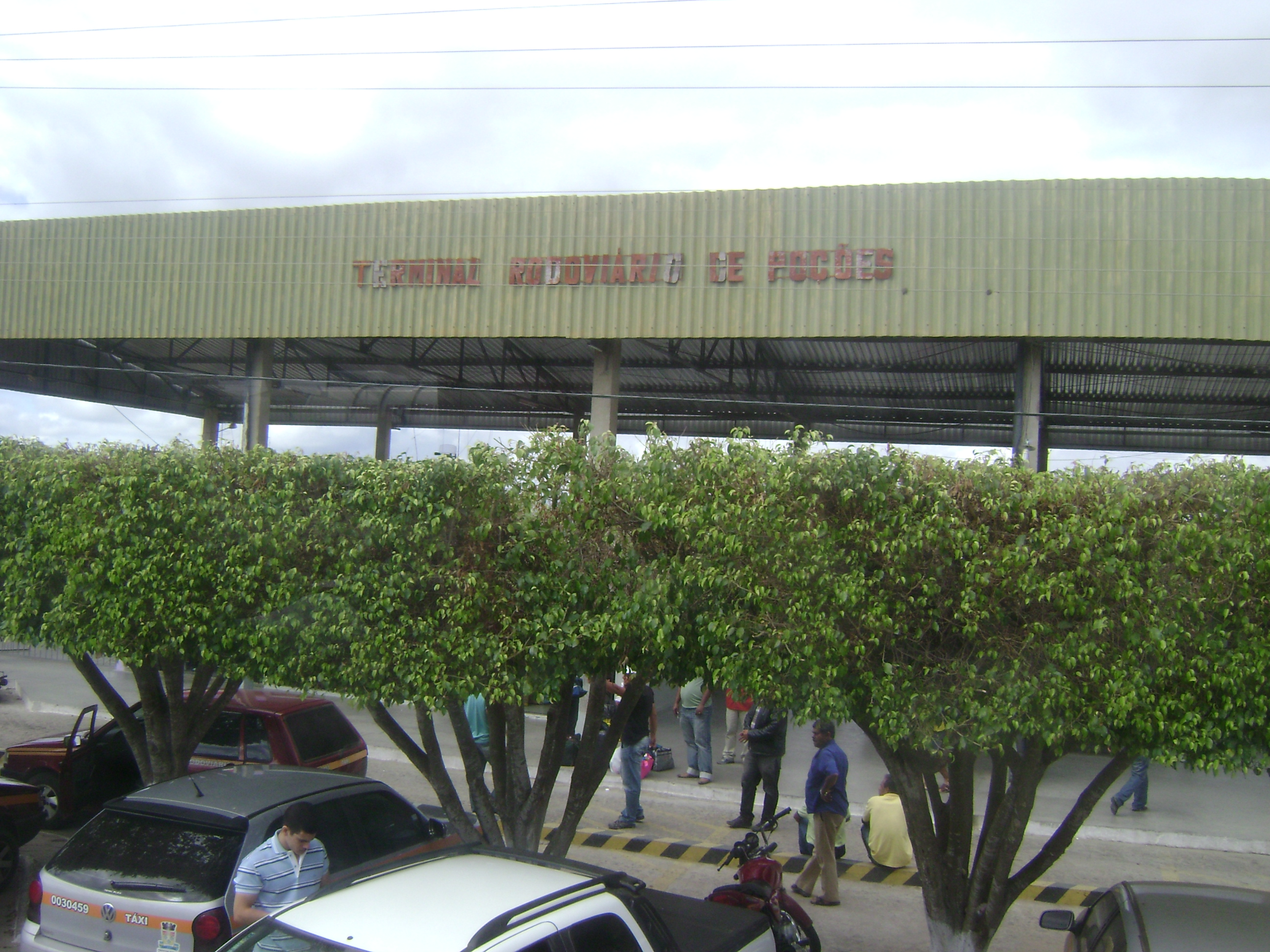

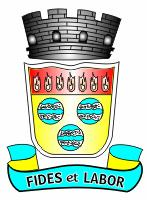
- Coat of arms
- Interactive map of Poções
- Country: Brazil
- Region: Nordeste
- State: Bahia

Population (2020)
  - Total: 46,879
- Time zone: UTC−3 (BRT)

Poções is a municipality in the state of Bahia in the North-East region of Brazil.

== Climate ==
Climate data for Poções, elevation 759 m (2,490 ft)
Month	Jan	Feb	Mar	Apr	May	Jun	Jul	Aug	Sep	Oct	Nov	Dec	Year
Mean daily maximum °C (°F)	29.4 (84.9)	29.9 (85.8)	29.4 (84.9)	27.6 (81.7)	25.9 (78.6)	24.2 (75.6)	23.6 (74.5)	24.1 (75.4)	25.6 (78.1)	27.5 (81.5)	28.3 (82.9)	29.0 (84.2)	27.0 (80.6)
Daily mean °C (°F)	22.3 (72.1)	22.8 (73.0)	22.8 (73.0)	21.5 (70.7)	20.0 (68.0)	18.6 (65.5)	18.0 (64.4)	17.8 (64.0)	19.1 (66.4)	20.8 (69.4)	21.7 (71.1)	21.8 (71.2)	20.6 (69.1)
Mean daily minimum °C (°F)	16.8 (62.2)	17.1 (62.8)	17.2 (63.0)	16.7 (62.1)	15.3 (59.5)	13.7 (56.7)	12.8 (55.0)	12.6 (54.7)	13.7 (56.7)	15.3 (59.5)	16.2 (61.2)	16.5 (61.7)	15.3 (59.5)
Average precipitation mm (inches)	63.1 (2.48)	62.1 (2.44)	58.9 (2.32)	32.1 (1.26)	15.3 (0.60)	11.5 (0.45)	10.8 (0.43)	7.7 (0.30)	11.2 (0.44)	36.1 (1.42)	103.6 (4.08)	93.1 (3.67)	504.1 (19.85)
Source: Universidade Federal de Campina Grande

== See also ==
- List of municipalities in Bahia
