= Sandro Gaúcho (footballer, born 1974) =

Brazilian footballer

Personal information
- Full name: Sandro Araújo da Silva
- Date of birth: May 19, 1974 (age 52)
- Place of birth: Restinga Seca, Rio Grande do Sul, Brazil
- Height: 1.80 m (5 ft 11 in)
- Position: Midfielder

Senior career*
Years	Team	Apps	(Gls)
- Palmeirense
- XV de Piracicaba
1999–2000	Grêmio		
2000–2002	Maia	62	(7)
2002–2005	Beira-Mar	74	(5)
2005–2007	Belenenses	40	(1)
2007–2009	Foolad	30	(3)
2010	Sanat Naft		
- * Club domestic league appearances and goals as of 5 February 2010 ‡ National team caps and goals as of 2009

Sandro Araújo da Silva (born May 19, 1974, in Restinga Seca, Rio Grande do Sul), known as Sandro Gaúcho, is a former Brazilian football midfielder.

== Club career ==
=== Club Career Statistics ===
Last Update 2 May 2010

Club performance			League		Cup		Continental		Total	
Season	Club	League	Apps	Goals	Apps	Goals	Apps	Goals	Apps	Goals
Iran			League		Hazfi Cup		Asia		Total	
2007–08	Foolad	Azadegan League	9	2			-	-		
2008–09	Foolad	Persian Gulf Cup	21	1			-	-		
2009–10	Sanat Naft	Azadegan League		2			-	-		
Total	Iran			5			0	0		
Career total				5			0	0		
