= Chander =

Chander is a given name and surname.

People with the name include:

== Surname ==
- Anupam Chander (born 1967), American lawyer and academic
- Bhanu Chander, South Indian actor who acted in many Telugu/Tamil movies
- Krishan Chander (1914–1977), Urdu and Hindi Afsaana Nigaar, or short story writer

== Given name ==
- Chander Kumar (born 1944), member of the 14th Lok Sabha of India
- Chander Mohan, the former Deputy Chief Minister of Haryana State in India
- Chander Prakash (general), (born 1953), Indian general
- Nirmal Chander Vij (born 1943), the 21st Indian Chief of Army Staff during 31 Dec 2002 – 31 Jan 2005
- Yogesh Chander Deveshwar, the chairman and CEO of ITC Limited, one of India's largest multi-business conglomerates

== See also ==
- Chandra (disambiguation)
- Chandler (surname), of which Chander is a spelling variant
