= Sandro Gaúcho (footballer, born 1968) =

Brazilian footballer

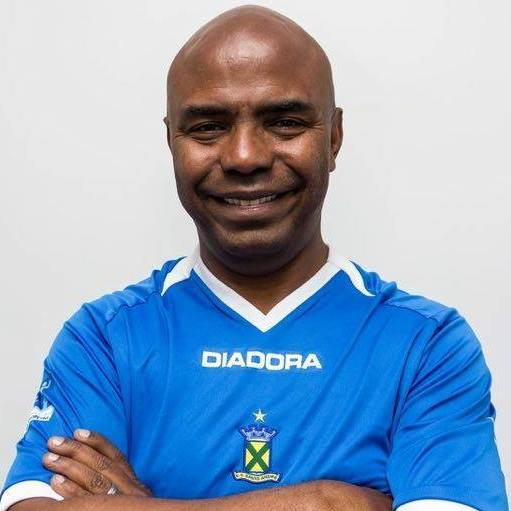

Personal information
- Full name: Sandro Rogério Formoso Pires
- Date of birth: 27 June 1968 (age 58)
- Place of birth: Bagé, Brazil
- Position: Forward

Youth career
- Internacional

Senior career*
Years	Team	Apps	(Gls)
1986–1988	Internacional		
1989	Esportivo		
1989–1990	Glória		
1990	Esportivo		
1990	Juventude		
1991	Glória		
1992–1994	Mogi Mirim		
1994	Veranópolis		
1995	União São João		
1996	Ypiranga-RS		
1996	Coritiba		
1997	Juventude		
1997	Bragantino		
1998	Ponte Preta		
1998–1999	Mogi Mirim		
1999	Inter de Santa Maria		
1999	Paraguaçuense		
1999–2000	Bragantino		
2000	Mogi Mirim		
2000	Sport Recife		
2001	Mogi Mirim		
2001	Santo André		
2001	São Caetano		
2002	Matonense		
2002–2003	América-RN		
2003	Figueirense		
2004–2005	Santo André		
2006	Marília		
2006	Ulbra-RS		
2006–2007	Santo André		

Managerial career
- 2009: Palestra São Bernardo
- 2010: Poços de Caldas
- 2010: Patrocinense
- 2011: Santo André
- 2012: Patrocinense
- * Club domestic league appearances and goals as of 12 March 2024

Sandro Rogério Formoso Pires (born 27 June 1968), also known as Sandro Pires and Sandro Gaúcho, is a Brazilian former professional footballer and manager, who played as a forward.

== Career ==
Born in Bagé, Sandro Pires (later known as Sandro Gaúcho) became famous for having played for several clubs in Brazil, being top scorer in the state of Rio Grande do Sul in 1996 for Ypiranga de Erechim, champion for Sport Recife in 2000 and mainly for the title of the 2004 Copa do Brasil with EC Santo André, where he scored the final goal of the victory at the Maracanã Stadium against Flamengo. As a result, he is considered one of the greatest idols in the club's history, for which he ended his career in 2007.

== Managerial career ==
Gaúcho had a brief career as a coach, managing the teams of Palestra São Bernardo, Poços de Caldas, Patrocinense, as well as EC Santo André in 2011.

== Personal life ==
He is currently a technical assistant to coach Fahel Júnior. Sandro is also the brother of footballers Caçapava and Sabará, who played for SC Internacional in 1980s. His son Luís Gaúcho also played professionally in the minor divisions of Minas Gerais.

In 2012 he contested the municipal elections as a councilor in Santo André, but was not elected.

== Honours ==
Sport

- Campeonato Pernambucano: 2000

América

- Campeonato Potiguar: 2003

Santo André

- Copa do Brasil: 2004

Individual

- 1996 Campeonato Gaúcho top scorer: 12 goals
