= Xander =

- Pronunciation: /ˈzændər/
- Gender: Male

Origin
- Origin: Greek
- Meaning: defender of man

Xander is an abbreviated form of the name Alexander and pronounced like "Zander". Alexander is the Latin form of the Greek name "Alexandros". The name's meaning is interpreted from "alexein" which means "to defend" plus "andros" which translates to "man, warrior" in a relationship or possessive form. Hence the meaning: defender of man.

== People ==
Music

- Xander (Danish singer) (born 1988), Danish singer (full name Alexander Theo Linnet)
- Xander (Dutch singer) (born 1985), Dutch singer songwriter (full name Xander Van Gameren)
- Xander (South Korean singer) (born 1988), also known as Alexander (full name Alexander Lee Eusebio)
- Xander de Buisonjé, (born 1973), Dutch singer
- Xander Rawlins, a British singer-songwriter known for his British Army charity single "1000 Miles Apart"

In media, arts and entertainment

- Xander Berkeley (born 1955), American actor
- Xander Marro (born 1975), puppet-maker and projectionist
- Xander McGuire (born 2002/2003), sports journalist and former actor
- Xander Mobus (born 1992), American voice actor
- Xander Parish, English ballet dancer
- Xander Straat (born 1965), Dutch stage, television, and film actor
- Alexander Armstrong (born 1970), sometimes credited as Xander Armstrong, English actor, comedian, broadcaster and singer

Sports

- Xander Bogaerts (born 1992), baseball shortstop on the San Diego Padres
- Xander Houtkoop (born 1989), Dutch professional footballer
- Xander Pitchers (born 1994), Namibian cricketer
- Xander Schauffele (born 1993), American professional golfer

== Fictional characters ==
- Xander Harris, a main character in the television series Buffy the Vampire Slayer
- Xander Bly, the Green Mystic Ranger from Power Rangers: Mystic Force
- Xander Cage, the protagonist of the xXx franchise, portrayed by Vin Diesel
- Xander Crews, in the animated series Frisky Dingo
- Xandir P. Wifflebottom, a character in the animated series Drawn Together.
- Xander, boyfriend of Dana Brody in Homeland (TV series)
- Xander Kiriakis, a character on the NBC soap opera Days of Our Lives
- Xander, a Nohrian prince in the game Fire Emblem Fates, the adopted brother of the main protagonist
- Xander Shakadera, character in Beyblade
- Xander Payne, a character in Mega Man series by Archie Comics

== See also ==
- Alexander
- Zander
