= Alexander =

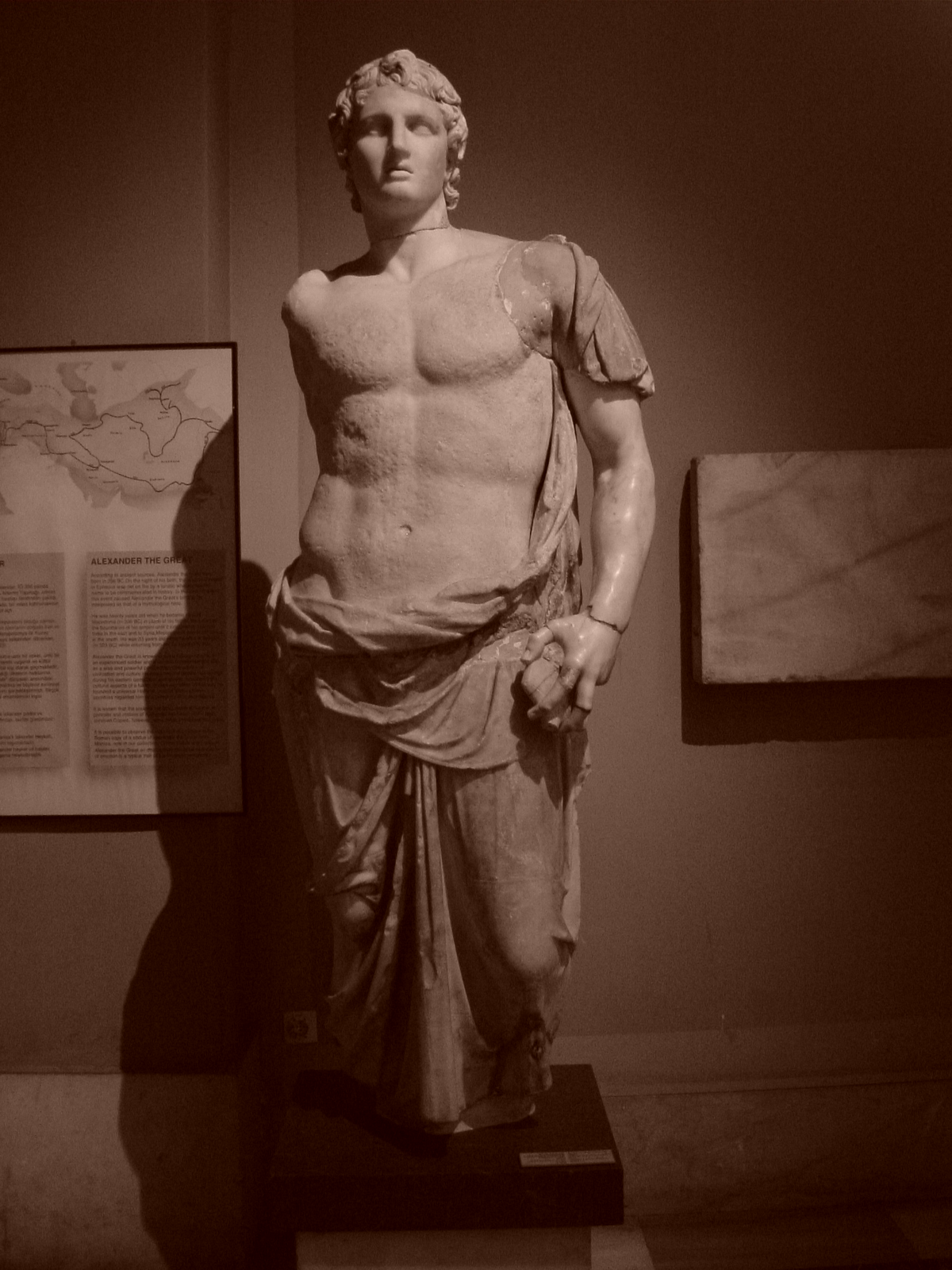
- Statue of Alexander the Great, whose fame popularized the name's use throughout Europe and Asia
- Pronunciation: /ˌælɪɡˈzændər/ AL-ig-ZAN-dər; Ancient Greek: [aléksandros] Modern Greek: [aˈleksanðros] Czech: [ˈalɛksandr] German: [alɛkˈsandɐ] Polish: [alɛkˈsandɛr] Russian: [ɐlʲɪkˈsandr] Serbo-Croatian: [aleksǎːndar, alěksaːn-] Swedish: [alɛkˈsǎnːdɛr]
- Gender: Male
- Name day: August 30

Origin
- Origin: Via Latin Alexander, originally from the Greek Ἀλέξανδρος (Aléxandros), from αλέξειν aléxein meaning "to ward off, keep off, turn away, defend, protect" and ἀνδρός andrós, genitive of ἀνήρ anḗr meaning "man".
- Meaning: "Defender, protector of man"

Other names
- Nicknames: Alex, Alec, Al, Xander, Zander
- Related names: Alex; Alec; Axel; Al; Alexandria; Alexsander; Alexandre; Alexandru; Aleksandre; Alejandro; Alessandro; Alastar; Alisdair; Lex; Iskandar; Sander; Sandra; Sandy; Sasha; Sikandar; Xander

Alexander (Greek: Ἀλέξανδρος) is a masculine name of Greek origin. The most prominent bearer of the name is Alexander the Great, the king of the Ancient Greek kingdom of Macedonia who created one of the largest empires in ancient history.

Variants listed here are Aleksandar, Aleksander, Oleksandr, Oleksander, Aleksandr, and Alekzandr. Related names and diminutives include Iskandar, Alec, Alek, Alekos, Alex, Alexsander, Alexandre, Aleks, Aleksa, Aleksandre, Alejandro, Alessandro, Alasdair, Sasha, Sandy, Sandro, Sikandar, Skander, Sander and Xander; feminine forms include Alexandra, Alexandria, and Sasha.

== Etymology ==
The name Alexander originates from the Greek: Ἀλέξανδρος (Aléxandros; 'defending men' or 'protector of men'). It is a compound of the verb ἀλέξειν (aléxein; 'to ward off, avert, defend') and the noun ἀνήρ (anḗr, genitive: ἀνδρός, andrós; meaning 'man').

The earliest attested form of the name, is the Mycenaean Greek feminine anthroponym 𐀀𐀩𐀏𐀭𐀅𐀨, a-re-ka-sa-da-ra, (/Alexandra/), written in the Linear B syllabic script. Alaksandu, alternatively called Alakasandu or Alaksandus, was a king of Wilusa who sealed a treaty with the Hittite king Muwatalli II c. 1280 BC; this is generally assumed to have been a Greek called Alexandros.

The name was one of the epithets given to the Greek goddess Hera and as such is usually taken to mean "one who comes to save warriors". In the Iliad, the character Paris is also known as Alexander. The name's popularity was spread throughout the Greek world by the military conquests of Alexander the Great. Most later Alexanders in various countries were directly or indirectly named after him.

=== Rulers of antiquity ===
- Alexander (Alexandros of Ilion), more often known as Paris of Troy
- Alexander I of Macedon
- Alexander II of Macedon
- Alexander the Great
- Alexander IV of Macedon
- Alexander V of Macedon
- Alexander of Pherae despot of Pherae between 369 and 358 BC
- Alexander I of Epirus king of Epirus about 342 BC
- Alexander II of Epirus king of Epirus 272 BC
- Alexander of Corinth, viceroy of Antigonus Gonatas and ruler of a rump state based on Corinth c. 250 BC
- Alexander (satrap) (died 220 BC), satrap of Persis under Seleucid king Antiochus III
- Alexander Balas, ruler of the Seleucid kingdom of Syria between 150 and 146 BC
- Alexander Zabinas, ruler of part of the Seleucid kingdom of Syria based in Antioch between 128 and 123 BC
- Alexander Jannaeus king of Judea, 103–76 BC
- Alexander of Judaea, son of Aristobulus II, king of Judaea
- Gaius Julius Alexander, Roman client king in Cilicia from 58 to 72
- Alexander Severus (208–235), Roman emperor
- Julius Alexander, lived in the 2nd century, an Emesene nobleman
- Domitius Alexander, Roman usurper who declared himself emperor in 308

=== Rulers of the Middle Ages ===
- Alexander, Byzantine Emperor (912–913)
- Alexander I of Scotland (c. 1078–1124)
- Alexander II of Scotland (1198–1249)
- Alexander Nevsky (1220–1263), Prince of Novgorod and Grand Prince of Vladimir
- Alexander III of Scotland (1241–1286)
- Nicholas Alexander of Wallachia, Voivode of Wallachia (died 1364)
- Ivan Alexander of Bulgaria, tsar of Bulgaria (beginnings of the 14th century – 1371)
- Aleksandr Mikhailovich of Tver, Prince of Tver as Alexander I and Grand Prince of Vladimir-Suzdal as Alexander II (1301–1339)
- Aleksander (1338–before 1386), Prince of Podolia (son of Narymunt)
- Alexander II of Georgia (1483–1510)
- Eskender, Emperor of Ethiopia (1472–1494)
- Alexander Jagiellon (Alexander of Poland), King of Poland (1461–1506)

=== Modern rulers ===
- Alexander I of Russia (1777–1825), emperor of Russia
- Alexander II of Russia (1818–1881), emperor of Russia
- Alexander III of Russia (1845–1894), emperor of Russia
- Alexander Karađorđević, Prince of Serbia (1842–1858)
- Alexander of Bulgaria (1857–1893), first prince of modern Bulgaria
- Alexander I Obrenović of Serbia (1876–1903), king of Serbia
- Alexander, Prince of Lippe (1831–1905), prince of Lippe
- Alexander I of Yugoslavia (1888–1934), first king of Yugoslavia
- Alexander, Crown Prince of Yugoslavia (born 1945), head of the Yugoslav Royal Family
- Zog I, also known as Skenderbeg III (1895–1961), king of Albanians
- Alexander of Greece (1893–1920), king of Greece
- Leka, Crown Prince of Albania (1939–2011), king of Albanians (throne pretender)
- Willem-Alexander, King of the Netherlands (born 1967), eldest child of Queen Beatrix and Prince Claus

==== Other royalty ====
- Alexander, Judean Prince, one of the sons of Herod the Great from his wife Mariamne
- Alexander Helios, Ptolemaic prince, one of the sons of Cleopatra and Mark Anthony
- Alexander, Judean Prince, son to the above Alexander and Cappadocian princess Glaphyra
- Alexander (d. 1418), son of Bulgarian tsar Ivan Shishman
- Prince Alexander John of Wales (1871), short-lived son of Edward VII
- Prince Alfred of Edinburgh and Saxe-Coburg and Gotha (1874–1899)
- Olav V of Norway (Prince Alexander of Denmark) (1903–1991)

=== Religious leaders ===
- Pope Alexander I (pope 97–105)
- Alexander of Apamea, 5th-century bishop of Apamea
- Pope Alexander II (pope 1058–1061)
- Pope Alexander III (pope 1159–1181)
- Pope Alexander IV (pope 1243–1254)
- Pope Alexander V ("Peter Philarges" c. 1339–1410)
- Pope Alexander VI (1492–1503), Roman pope
- Pope Alexander VII (1599–1667)
- Pope Alexander VIII (pope 1689–1691)
- Alexander of Constantinople, bishop of Constantinople (314–337)
- St. Alexander of Alexandria, Coptic Pope, Patriarch of Alexandria between 313 and 328
- Pope Alexander II of Alexandria, Coptic Pope (702–729)
- Alexander of Lincoln, bishop of Lincoln
- Alexander of Jerusalem
- See also Saint Alexander, various saints with this name

=== Other people ===
==== Antiquity ====
- Alexander (artists), the name of a number of artists of ancient Greece and Rome
- Alexander of Lyncestis (died 330 BC), contemporary of Alexander the Great
- Alexander (son of Polyperchon) (died 314 BC), regent of Macedonia
- Alexander (Antigonid general), 3rd-century BC cavalry commander under Antigonus III Doson
- Alexander of Athens, 3rd-century BC Athenian comic poet
- Alexander Aetolus (fl. 280 BC), poet and member of the Alexandrian Pleiad
- Alexander (son of Lysimachus) (fl. 284–281 BC), Macedonian royal
- Alexander (grandson of Seleucus I Nicator) (fl. 270–240 BC), Greek Anatolian nobleman
- Alexander (Aetolian general), briefly conquered Aegira in 220 BC
- Alexander of Acarnania (died 191 BC), confidant of Antiochus III the Great
- Alexander Isius (fl. 198–189 BC), Aetolian military commander
- Alexander (Ephesian) (fl. 50–65), mentioned in the First Epistle to Timothy
- Alexander Lychnus, early 1st-century BC poet and historian
- Alexander Philalethes, 1st century BC physician
- Alexander Polyhistor, Greek scholar of the 1st century BC
- Alexander of Myndus, ancient Greek writer on zoology and divination
- Alexander of Aegae, peripatetic philosopher of the 1st century AD
- Alexander of Cotiaeum, 2nd-century Greek grammarian and tutor of Marcus Aurelius
- Alexander Numenius, 2nd-century Greek rhetorician
- Alexander Peloplaton, 2nd-century Greek rhetorician
- Alexander of Abonoteichus (c. 105–170), Greek religious leader and imposter
- Alexander of Aphrodisias (fl. 200), Greek commentator and philosopher
- Alexander of Lycopolis, 4th-century author of an early Christian treatise against Manicheans
- Alexander, a member of the Jerusalem Temple Sanhedrin mentioned in Acts 4:6

==== Middle Ages ====
- Alexander of Hales, English theologian in the 13th century

==== Modern ====
- Alexander (magician) (1880–1954), American stage magician specializing in mentalism

== People with the given name ==
People with the given name Alexander or variants include:

- Technoblade (1999–2022), American YouTuber, real name Alexander, surname not made public
- Alexander (1927–2023), British sculptor and conceptual artist
- Alexander Aigner (1909–1988), Austrian mathematician
- Aleksandr Akimov (1953–1986), Russian nuclear engineer who died in Chernobyl
- Alexander Albon (born 1996), Thai-British racing driver
- Alexander Alekhine (1892-1946), Russian-French chess player
- Alexander Vasilyevich Alexandrov (1883–1946), Russian composer
- Aleksander Allila (1890–?), Finnish politician
- Alexander Argov (1914–1995), Russian-born Israeli composer
- Alexander Armah (born 1994), American football player
- Alexander Armstrong (born 1970), British comedian and singer
- Aleksandr Averbukh (born 1974), Israeli pole vaulter
- Alex Baldock (born 1970), British businessman
- Alec Baldwin (born Alexander Rae Baldwin III, 1958), American actor
- Aleksander Barkov (born 1995), Finnish ice hockey player
- Alexander G. Bassuk, American pediatric neurologist
- Alexander Graham Bell (1847–1922), Scottish inventor of the first practical telephone
- Alexander Berkman (1870–1936), Russian-American anarchist and author
- Alexander Björk (born 1990), Swedish golfer
- Alexander Borodin (1833–1887), Russian composer
- Alexander Burnett (disambiguation), several people
- Alexander Calder (1898–1976), American sculptor best known for making mobiles
- Alexander Milne Calder (1846-1923), American sculptor
- Alexander Stirling Calder (1870-1945), American sculptor
- Alexander Chalmers (1645–1703), Polish-Scottish merchant, jurist, politician
- Aleksandr Davidovich (disambiguation), several people
- Alexander Davidson (disambiguation), several people
- Alexander Day (disambiguation), several people
- Alexander Nicholas de Abrew Abeysinghe (1894–1963), Sri Lankan Sinhala politician
- Alex DeBrincat (born 1997), American ice hockey player
- Alexander Davidovich Dilman (born 1976), Russian organic chemist
- Aleksandar Djordjevic (born 1967), Serbian basketball player
- Alexander Donchenko (born 1998), German chess grandmaster
- Alexander Dubček (1921–1992), leader of Czechoslovakia (1968–1969)
- Alexander Fach (born 2002), Swiss racing driver
- Alex Ebert (born 1978), American singer-songwriter
- Alexander Lee (born 1988), also known as Alexander or Xander, South Korean singer, member of U-KISS
- Alexander Exarch (1810–1891), Bulgarian revivalist, publicist and journalist, participant in the struggle for an independent Bulgarian Exarchate
- Alex Ferguson (born 1941), Scottish football player and manager
- Alexander Fleming (1881–1955), Scottish discoverer of penicillin
- Alexander Zusia Friedman (1897–1943), Polish rabbi, educator, activist, and journalist
- Aleksander Gabelic (born 1965), Swedish politician
- Alex Galchenyuk (born 1994), American ice hockey player
- Aleksander Gamme (born 1976), Norwegian adventurer
- Alexander Gardner (disambiguation), multiple people
- Alexander Glazunov (1865–1936), Russian composer
- Alexander Goldberg (born 1974), British rabbi, barrister, and human rights activist
- Alexander Goldberg (chemical engineer), Israeli chemical engineer and President of the Technion – Israel Institute of Technology
- Alexander Goldscheider (born 1950), Czech/British composer, producer and writer
- Alexander Gomelsky (1928–2005), Russian head coach of USSR basketball national team for 30 years
- Alexander Gordon (disambiguation), several people
- Aleksandr Gordon (1931–2020), Russian-Soviet director, screenwriter and actor
- Aleksandr Gorelik (1945–2012), Soviet figure skater
- Alexander Gould (born 1994), American actor
- Alexander Grothendieck (1928–2014), German-born French mathematician
- Alexander Grotov (born 1985), German politician
- Alexander Gustafsson (born 1987), Swedish mixed martial arts fighter
- Alexander Haig (1924–2010), American general and politician
- Alexander Hamilton (1755–1804), first United States Secretary of the Treasury and one of the founding fathers of the United States
- Alexander Hamilton Jr. (1786–1875), American attorney and son of Alexander Hamilton
- Alexander Hamilton Jr. (1816–1889), son of James Alexander Hamilton and grandson of Alexander Hamilton
- Alexander Haugg (born 1968), German actor
- Alexander Held (1958–2026), German actor
- Alexander Henn, German anthropologist
- Alexander Henry (1823–1883), mayor of Philadelphia
- Alex Higgins (1949–2010), Northern Irish snooker player
- Alexander Hofmann (born 1992), German politician
- Alexander Hollins (born 1996), American football player
- Alexander Holtz (born 2002), Swedish ice hockey player
- Alex Horne (born 1978), British comedian
- Alexander von Humboldt (1769–1859), Prussian naturalist and explorer
- Aleksander Ihnatowicz (born 1984), Polish programmer and actor
- Alexander Ilečko (1937–2023), Slovak sculptor
- Alexander Isak (born 1999), Swedish Football Player
- Alex Israel (born 1982), American artist
- Alex Israel, founder of Metropolis Technologies
- Alex Jones (born 1974), American radio show host and conspiracy theorist
- Aleksandr Kamshalov (1932–2019), Soviet politician
- Alex Kapranos (born 1972), Scottish musician, author, songwriter and producer, front-man of Franz Ferdinand
- Aleksandar Katai (born 1991), Serbian footballer
- Alexander Kerensky (1881–1970) leader of Russian Provisional Government
- Alexander Kerfoot (born 1994), Canadian ice hockey player
- Aleksandr Khrupin (born 1994), Russian para-athlete
- Alex Killorn (born 1989), Canadian ice hockey player
- Alexander Klaws (born 1983), German singer and songwriter
- Alexander Klingspor (born 1977), Swedish painter and sculptor
- Alexander Kluge (1932–2026), German author, philosopher, academic and film director
- Aleksandr Kogan (born 1985/86), Moldovan-born American psychologist and data scientist
- Alexander Kops (born 1984), Dutch politician
- Alexander Korda (1893–1956), Hungarian film director
- Alexander Kucheryavenko (born 1987), Russian ice hockey player
- Aleksander Kwaśniewski (born 1954), former President of Poland
- Alex Lasarenko (1963-2020), American composer, classical pianist, and creative director
- Aleksander Lesser (1814–1884), Polish painter, illustrator, and art critic
- Alexander Levinsky (1910–1990), Canadian ice hockey player
- Alexander Ivanovich Levitov (1835–1877), Russian writer
- Alexander Lévy (born 1990), French golfer
- Alexander Ludwig (born 1992), Canadian actor
- Alexander "Sandy" Lyle (born 1958), Scottish golfer
- Alexander Lukashenko (born 1954), President of Belarus
- Alex Manninger (born 1977), Austrian footballer
- Alexander "Ali" Marpet (born 1993), American football player
- Aleksandr Marshal (born 1957), Russian singer, songwriter, and musician
- Alexander Mattison (born 1998), American football player
- Alexander McCall Smith (born 1948), Scottish writer
- Alexander McClure (1828–1909), American politician, editor and writer
- Alexander Lyell McEwin (1897–1988), known as Lyell McEwin, Australian politician, Minister for Health
- Alexander McQueen (1969–2010), British fashion designer and couturier
- Aleksander Meysztowicz (1864–1943), Polish politician and landowner
- Alexander Michel Melki (born 1992), Swedish-Lebanese footballer
- Alexander Mirsky (born 1964), Latvian politician
- Alexander Mitta (1933–2025), Soviet and Russian film director, screenwriter and actor
- Alexander Mohrenberg (born 1995), German politician
- Alexander Francis Molamure (1888–1951), 1st Speaker of the State Council of Ceylon and 1st Speaker of the Parliament of Sri Lanka
- Aleksandr Nikolayev (disambiguation), several people
- Alexander Nikolov (boxer) (born 1940), Bulgarian boxer
- Alex Norén (born 1982), Swedish golfer
- Alexander Nylander (born 1998), Swedish ice hockey player
- Alexander O'Neal (born 1953), American singer
- Alexander Onassis (1948-1973), American-Greek businessman
- Alexander Ovechkin (born 1985), Russian hockey player
- Alexander Patch (1889–1945), American general during World War II
- Aleksandr Panayotov (born 1984), Russian-Ukrainian singer and songwriter
- Alexander Pechtold (born 1965), Dutch politician
- Alexander Penn (1906–1972), Israeli poet
- Alexander Perera Jayasuriya (1901–1980), Sri Lankan Sinhala MP and Cabinet Minister
- Alexander Pichushkin (born 1974), prolific Russian serial killer
- Alex Pietrangelo (born 1990), Canadian ice hockey player
- Alexander Pilis (born 1954), Brazilian architectural investigator
- Alexander Piorkowski (1904–1948), German Nazi SS concentration camp commandant executed for war crimes
- Alexander Ponomarenko (born 1964), Russian billionaire businessman
- Alexander Pope (1688–1744), English poet
- Alexander Prass (born 2001), Austrian footballer
- Alexander Pruss (born 1973), Canadian philosopher
- Alexander Popov (disambiguation), several people
- Alexander Ptushko (1900–1973), Russian film director
- Alexander Pushkin (1799–1837), Russian writer
- Aleksandar Radišić (born 1984), Serbian para-athlete
- Alexander Radulov (born 1986), Russian ice hockey player
- Alexander Raevsky (aviator) (1887–1937), Russian aviator
- Alexander Ragoza (1858–1919), Russian general in World War I
- Alexander Edmund de Silva Wijegooneratne Samaraweera Rajapakse (1866–1937), Sri Lankan Sinhala politician
- Alexander Rendell (born 1990), Thai actor and singer
- Alexander Robinson (1901-1995), Northern Irish boxer, Ulster loyalist paramilitary and Ulster Special Constabulary reservist.
- Alex Rodriguez (born 1975), Major League Baseball star, won 3 AL MVP awards, also known as A-Rod
- Alexander Rou (1906–1973), Russian film director
- Alexander Rowe (born 1992), Australian athlete
- Alexander Rudolph ("Al McCoy"; 1894–1966), American boxer
- Alexander Ruuttu (born 1992), Finnish ice hockey player
- Alexander Russell (born 2002), Welsh cricketer
- Alexander Rybak (born 1986), Belarusian-born Norwegian artist and violinist
- Alexander Salkind (1921–1997), French film producer
- Alex Salmond (1954–2024), Scottish politician, first minister of Scotland (2007–2014)
- Aleksandar Šćepanović (born 1982), Croatian basketballer
- Alexander Schaller (born 2002), German bobsledder
- Alexander Scholz (born 1992), Danish footballer
- Alexander Scriabin (1872–1915), Russian composer and pianist
- Alexander Selkirk (1676–1721), Scottish privateer and Royal Navy officer
- Alexander Semin (born 1984), Russian hockey player
- Aleksander Serov (born 1951), Russian singer
- Alexander Serov (1820–1871), Russian composer
- Alexander Shatilov (born 1987), Uzbek-Israeli artistic gymnast
- Alexander Theodore "Sasha" Shulgin (1925–2014), American chemist, psychopharmacologist, and author
- Alexander Sieghart (born 1994), Thai footballer
- Alexander Skarsgård (born 1976), Swedish actor
- Alexander Solonik (1960–1997), Russian murder victim
- Aleksandr Solzhenitsyn (1918–2008), Russian writer, Nobel laureate, Soviet dissident
- Alexander Sørloth (born 1995), Norwegian footballer
- Alexander Stafford, British politician
- Alexander Stavenitz (1901–1960), Russian Empire-born American visual artist and educator
- Alexander Steen (born 1984), Swedish ice hockey player
- Alexander Steffen (born 1993), German politician
- Alexander Stevens (disambiguation), several people
- Alex Stitt (1939–2016), Australian graphic designer and animator
- Alexander Stubb (born 1968), Finnish politician
- Alexander "Sonny" Styles (born 2004), American football player
- Alexander Suvorov (1730–1800), Russian military leader
- Alexander Thorburn (1836–1894), Canadian politician
- Alexander Tikhonov (born 1947), Russian biathlete
- Alexander Tschich (born 1992), German politician
- Alex Turner (born 1986), British musician, songwriter and producer, front-man of Arctic Monkeys and The Last Shadow Puppets
- Alexander Vainberg (born 1961), Russian politician
- Lex van Dam (born 1968), Dutch trader and TV personality
- Alexander Van der Bellen (born 1944), President of Austria
- Alexander Varchenko (born 1949), Russian mathematician
- Aleksander Veingold (born 1953), Estonian and Soviet chess player and coach
- Alexander Verkhovskiy (born 1956), Russian entrepreneur
- Aleksandr Verkhovsky (1886–1938), Russian military and political figure
- Alexander Vika (1933–2025), Slovak sculptor
- Aleksandr Vlasov (disambiguation), several people
- Alexander Volkanovski (born 1988), Australian UFC Fighter
- Alexander Volkov (fighter) (born 1988), Russian UFC Fighter
- Alexander Voltz (born 1999), Australian composer
- Aleksandar Vučić (born 1970), President of Serbia
- Aleksander Wachniewski (1881–1976), Polish engineer and politician
- Alexander Wennberg (born 1994), Swedish ice hockey player
- Alexander Wijemanne, Sri Lankan Sinhala lawyer and politician
- Alexander Wilson (disambiguation), several people
- Alex Zanardi (born 1966), Italian racing driver and paracyclist
- Aleksandar Zečević (born 1996), Serbian basketball player in the Israeli Basketball Premier League
- Alexander Zhurbin (born 1945), Russian composer
- Alexander Ziegler (German writer) (1822–1887), German writer and economist
- Alexander Ziegler (Swiss writer) (1944–1987), Swiss author and actor
- Alexander Zverev (born 1997), German tennis player
- Oleksandr Andriyevskyi (born 1994), Ukrainian footballer
- Oleksandr Berestianyi (1954–2025), Ukrainian poet
- Oleksandr Usyk (born 1987), Ukrainian professional boxer
- Oleksandr Zakhozhyi (born 1993), Ukrainian professional boxer
- Oleksandr Zubov (born 1983), Ukrainian chess player and Grandmaster

== In other languages ==
- Afrikaans: Alexander
- Albanian: Aleksandër
  - Albanian diminutive: Leka
- Amharic: እስክንድር (Isikinidiri, Eskender)
- Arabic: اسكندر (Iskandar)
- Armenian: Ալեքսանդր (Aleksandr)
- Asturian: Alexandru, Xandru
- Azerbaijani: İsgəndər/Исҝәндәр/ایسگندر
- Basque: Alesander
- Belarusian: Аляксандр (Aliaksandr), Алесь (Ales)
- Bengali: আলেকজান্ডার (Alēkjānḍār), সিকান্দার (Sikāndār), ইস্কান্দার (Iskāndār)
- Bulgarian: Александър (Aleksandŭr), Сашко (Sashko)
- Catalan: Alexandre/Aleixandre
- Chinese:
  - Historical:
    - Traditional: 烏弋山離, Simplified: 乌弋山离, Baxter-Sagart: /*[ʔ]ˤa lək s-ŋrar [r]aj/
    - Traditional and Simplified: 阿荔散, Baxter Romanization: 'a lejH sanH
  - Contemporary: Traditional: 亞歷山大, Simplified: 亚历山大, Pinyin: Yàlìshāndà, Jyutping: aa^{3} lik^{6} saan^{1} daai^{6}, Wugniu: iá-liq-sé-da, BUC: Ā-lĭk-săng-dâi
- Czech: Alexandr, Alexander
- Danish: Aleksander, Alexander
- Dutch: Alexander
- Esperanto: Aleksandro
- Estonian: Aleksander
- English: Alexander
- Finnish: Aleksanteri
- French: Alexandre
- Galician: Alexandre
- Georgian: ალექსანდრე (Aleksandre)
- German: Alexander
- Greek
  - Mycenaean Greek: 𐀀𐀩𐀏𐀭𐀅𐀫 (Aléxandros)
  - Ancient Greek: Ἀλέξανδρος (Aléxandros)
  - Koine Greek: Ἀλέξανδρος (Aléxandros)
  - Modern Greek: Αλέξανδρος (Aléxandros)
- Hawaiian: Alekanekelo
- Hebrew: אלכסנדר (Aleksander)
- Hindi: सिकंदर (Sikandar)
- Hungarian: Sándor, Alexander, Elek
- Icelandic: Alexander
- Indonesian: Iskandar, Alexander
- Irish: Alastar
- Italian: Alessandro
- Japanese: アレキサンダー (Arekisandā)
- Korean: 알렉산더 (Alleksandeo)
- Kazakh: Искандер (Iskander)
- Kyrgyz: Искендер (Iskender)
- Latin: Alexander
- Latvian: Aleksandrs
- Lithuanian: Aleksandras
- Macedonian: Александар (Aleksandar), Сашко (Sashko, Saško)
- Malay: Iskandar
- Malayalam
  - Syriac Origin : ചാണ്ടി (t͡ʃaːɳʈI), ഇടിക്കുള (IʈIkkʊɭa)
  - Greek Origin : അലക്സിയോസ് (alaksIyos), അലക്സി (alaksI)
  - Anglican Origin : അലക്സാണ്ടര്‍ (alaksa:ndar), അലക്സ് (alaks)
- Mongolian: Александр (Alyeksandr)
- Norwegian: Aleksander, Alexander
- Pashto: سکندر (Sikandar)
- Persian: الکساندر (Aleksânder), اسکندر (Eskandar)
- Polish: Aleksander
- Portuguese: Alexandre, Alexandro, Alessandro, Leandro
- Punjabi: Sikandar
- Romanian: Alexandru, Alex, Sandu
- Russian: Александр (Aleksandr), Саша (Sasha)
- Rusyn: Александер (Aleksander)
- Sanskrit: अलक्षेन्द्र (Alakṣendra)
- Scottish Gaelic: Alasdair
- Scots: Alastair, Alistair, Alister, Sandy
- Serbo-Croatian: Александар / Aleksandar
- Slovak: Alexander
- Slovene: Aleksander
- Spanish: Alejandro
- Swedish: Alexander
- Syriac: ܐܠܟܣܢܕܪ (Alexander)
- Tagalog: Alejandro
- Thai: อเล็กซานเดอร์
- Turkish: İskender
- Ukrainian: Олександр (Oleksandr, sometimes anglicized Olexander), Сашко (Sashko), Олесь (Oles), Олелько (Olelko)
- Urdu: سکندر (Sikandar)
- Valencian: Alecsandro, Aleksandro, Aleixandre, Alexandre
- Vietnamese: Alexander, A Lịch San
- Welsh: Alisander, Aled
- Yiddish: אלעקסאנדער (Aleksander), סענדער (Sender)

== Variants and diminutives ==
- Alex
- Alexsander
- Alexey
- Sasha/Sash
- Sandy
- Xander
- Zander

== See also ==
- Alex (disambiguation)
- Alexander (surname)
- Alexandra
- Hera Alexandros, epithet of the Greek goddess Hera
- Justice Alexander (disambiguation)
- Aleksander (Hasidic dynasty)
