= Rustem F. Ismagilov =

- Born: 1973 (age 52–53); Ufa, Russia
- Awards: Wisconsin Alumni Association Forward under 40 (2012); Richard P. Feynman Prize for Excellence in Teaching (2024)

Academic background
- Education: BSc, Chemistry, 1994, Higher Chemical College of the Russian Academy of Sciences; PhD, Chemistry, 1998, University of Wisconsin–Madison
- Thesis: Adiabatic electron transfer: theory and experiment (1998)

Academic work
- Institutions: California Institute of Technology; University of Chicago
- Notable students: Sujit Datta; Elaine Hsiao
- Main interests: Global Health; Microbial communities and biophysics of the gut microbiome Diagnostics and antimicrobial susceptibility testing Microfluidics and single molecule and single cell analysis Complex Networks of reactions, cells and organisms
- Website: https://ismagilovlab.caltech.edu/

Rustem F. Ismagilov is a Russian-American chemist. He is the Ethel Wilson Bowles and Robert Bowles Professor of Chemistry and Chemical Engineering at the California Institute of Technology.

== Early life and education ==
Ismagilov was born in 1973 in Ufa, Russia. He received his Bachelor of Science degree in chemistry in 1994 from the Higher Chemical College of the Russian Academy of Sciences before moving to the United States. In 1998, he received a Ph.D. in chemistry from the University of Wisconsin–Madison while working with Stephen F. Nelson. Following his Ph.D., Ismagilov was a Postdoctoral Fellow with the Whitesides Research Group at Harvard University.

== Career ==
Ismagilov joined the faculty at the University of Chicago in 2001 as an assistant professor. While working in this role, he focused his research on the chemical complexity of biological systems using microfabrication and microfluidics as synthetic tools. As a result, he received a five-year, $40,000 award from The Camille and Henry Dreyfus Foundation and became a 2002 Searle Scholar. The following year, Ismagilov received a three-year grant from the Arnold and Mabel Beckman Foundation to study "the use of microfluidics to control chemical systems in a time-dependent fashion." While conducting his research, he was a recipient of the 2003 Presidential Early Career Award for Scientists and Engineers, 2005 Arthur C. Cope Scholar Award, and was listed among the world’s 100 Top Young Innovators for 2004.

Ismagilov was promoted to the rank of associate professor of chemistry in 2005. Following his promotion, he co-developed a microfluidics technique to find medical-diagnostic applications. He also developed a microfluidic device called SlipChip as a method for precise quantification of nucleic acids in resource-limited settings. In 2008, Ismagilov was the recipient of the American Chemical Society Award in Pure Chemistry, which recognizes significant research done by young scientists. By 2011, Ismagilov was listed by Clarivate as being amongst the most influential 100 chemists based on the highest citation impact scores for chemistry papers published from 2000 to 2010. He was also elected a Fellow of the American Association for the Advancement of Science.

=== California Institute of Technology ===
Ismagilov left the University of Chicago in 2012 to become the John W. and Herberta M. Miles Professor of Chemistry and Chemical Engineering. He was a 2012 winner of the Wisconsin Alumni Association’s Forward under 40 award and received Caltech's Richard P. Feynman Excellence in Teaching Award in 2024.

In 2013, Ismagilov was appointed the Director of the Jacobs Institute for Molecular Engineering for Medicine.

In 2021, Ismagilov was appointed a Professor for the Merkin Institute for Translational Research.

During the COVID-19 pandemic, Ismagilov's laboratory launched a large, community-based study of COVID-19 transmission, enrolling more than 400 participants between 2020-2022. Early results from the study were profiled in The New York Times.

== Ismagilov Research Group ==
Alumni of the Ismagilov Research Group Include:

- Sujit Datta (California Institute of Technology)
- Elaine Hsiao (University of California, Los Angeles)
