= Aleksandre =

- Gender: Male

Other names
- Alternative spelling: ალექსანდრე
- Related names: Alexander

Aleksandre (Georgian: ალექსანდრე) is a Georgian masculine given name, an equivalent of Alexander, meaning "defender of men". According to the Public Service Hall, it is among the top 10 most common Georgian given names for males. Notable people with the given name include:

- Sandro Akhmeteli (real name Aleksandre Akhmetelashvili; 1886–1937), Georgian theater director
- Aleksandre Amisulashvili (born 1982), Georgian footballer
- Aleksandre Andronikashvili (1871–1923), Georgian military commander and resistance leader
- Aleksandre Bakshi (born 1997), Georgian tennis player
- Aleksandre Basilaia (1942–2009), Georgian composer and songwriter
- Prince Alexander of Georgia (real name Aleksandre Batonishvili; 1770–1844), Georgian royal prince
- Aleksandre Chikvaidze (1932–2012), Soviet and Georgian statesman and diplomat
- Aleksandre Chivadze (born 1955), Georgian footballer
- Aleksandre Geladze (born 1972), Georgian footballer
- Aleksandre Gogoberishvili (born 1977), Georgian footballer
- Aleksandre Guruli (born 1985), Georgian footballer
- Aleksandre Jejelava (born 1973), Georgian politician
- Aleksandre Kalandadze (born 2001), Georgian footballer
- Alexander Khakhanov (born Aleksandre Khakhanashvili; 1866–1912), Georgian-Russian historian and archaeologist
- Aleksandre Khetaguri (born 1976), Georgian politician
- Aleksandre Kobakhidze (born 1987), Georgian footballer
- Aleksandre Koshkadze (born 1981), Georgian footballer
- Aleksandre Kvakhadze (born 1984), Georgian footballer
- Aleksi Machavariani (real name Aleksandre; 1913–1995), Soviet and Georgian composer, conductor and pedagogue
- Aleksandre Metreveli (born 1993), Georgian tennis player
- Aleksandre Mirtskhulava (1911–2009), Georgian politician
- Aleksandre Motserelia (born 1972), Georgian politician
- Aleksandre Pirtskhalaishvili (1888–1965), Soviet and Georgian historian and professor
- Aleksandre Rekhviashvili (born 1974), Georgian footballer
- Aleksandre Tarsaidze (1901–1978), Georgian-American writer and historian
- Alexander Toradze (romanized as Aleksandre; 1952–2022), Georgian-born American pianist
