= Sender (name) =

- Gender: Male
- Language: Yiddish

Other names
- Related names: Alexander, Sander

Sender (Yiddish: סענדער, Hebrew: סֶנְדֶּר) is a Yiddish-language masculine given name. It is a variant of the name Alexander.

== Given name ==
- Sender ben Mordecai (fl. 17th century), rabbi
- Sender Garlin (1902–1999), American writer
- Sender Hadad (1859–1899), guard
- Sender Jarmulowsky (1840–1912), Russian-American banker
- Sender Safrin (1769–1818), founder of the Komarno Hasidic dynasty

== Last name ==
- Isidor Sender (1905–1943), Australian rugby player
- Ramón J. Sender (1901–1982), Spanish novelist, essayist and journalist
- Ramón Sender Barayón (born 1934), Spanish-American composer, visual artist and writer
- Ruth Minsky Sender (1926–2024), American memoirist
- Toni Sender (1888–1964), German activist

== See also ==
- Sander (name)
