= Alexander Ziegler =

Alexander Ziegler may refer to:

- Alexander Ziegler (German writer) (1822–1887), German writer and economist
- Alexander Ziegler (Swiss writer) (1944–1987), Swiss writer and actor
- Alexander Ziegler (hammer thrower) (born 1987), German hammer thrower and winner of the 2015 German Athletics Championships
