= Alexsander =

Male given name

Alexsander is a male given name, is a replica in writing of the American phonetics of the name Alexander. It may also refer to:

- Alexsander (footballer, born 1998), Alexsander Jhonatta de Oliveira Andrade, Brazilian football defender
- Alexsander (footballer, born 2003), Alexsander Christian Gomes da Costa, Brazilian football midfielder

== See also ==
- Alex Sander (born 1997), Indonesian football goalkeeper
