= General Alexander =

General Alexander may refer to:

- Alexander (son of Polyperchon) (d. 314 BC), Macedonian general
- Alexander (Aetolian general) (fl. 220 BC)
- Alexander (Antigonid general) (fl. 220s BC)
- Prince Charles Alexander of Lorraine (1712–1780), Austrian general
- David Anderson (British Army officer) (1821–1909), British Army general
- David Alexander (Royal Marines officer) (1926–2017), Royal Marines major general
- Edward McGill Alexander (born 1947), South African Army major general
- Edward Porter Alexander (1835–1910), Confederate States Army brigadier general
- Ernest Alexander (1870–1934), British Army major general
- Henry Templer Alexander (1911–1977), British Army major general
- Harold Alexander, 1st Earl Alexander of Tunis (1891–1969), British Army major general
- Keith B. Alexander (b. 1951), U.S. Army general
- Milton Alexander (1796–1856), Illinois Militia brigadier general
- Robert Alexander (United States Army officer) (1863–1941), U.S. Army major general
- Ronald Okeden Alexander (1888–1949), Canadian Army general
- William Alexander, Lord Stirling (1726–1783), Continental Army major general
- William Alexander (Glasgow MP) (1874–1954), British Army brigadier general

== See also ==
- David Alexander-Sinclair (1927–2014), British Army major general
