= Alexander Dilman =

Russian organic chemist

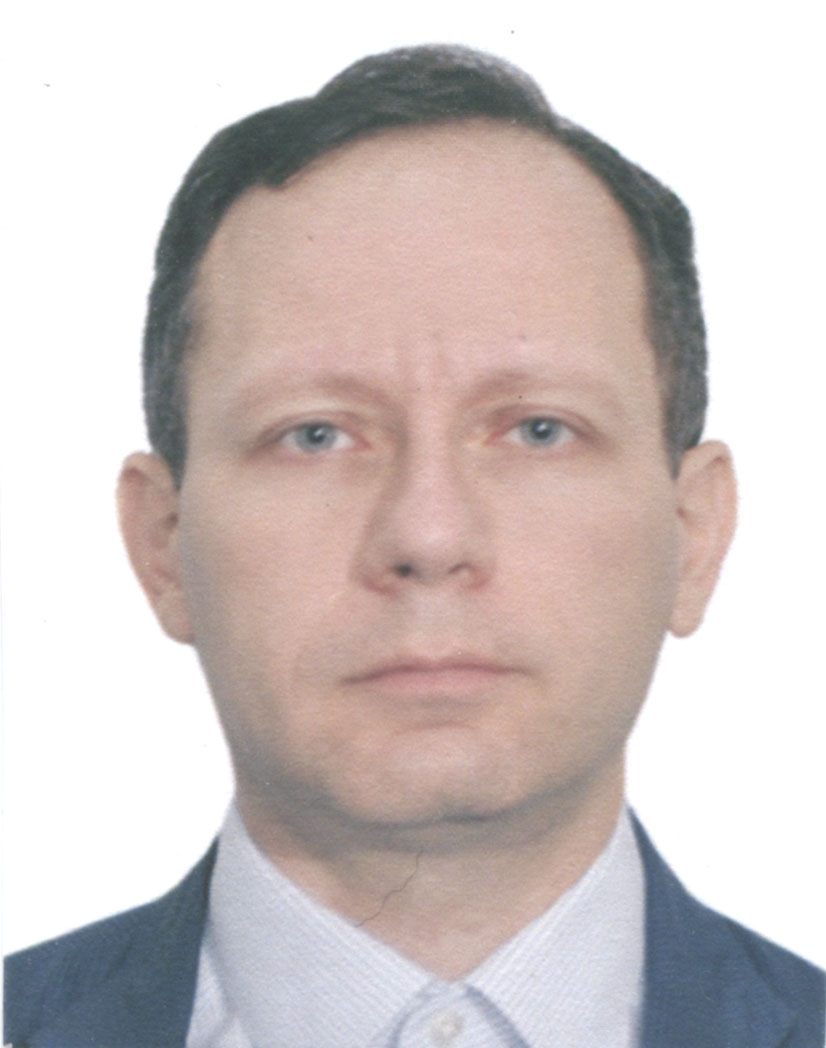
- Education: Higher Chemical College of the Russian Academy of Sciences
- Scientific career
- Fields: Organic chemistry, Organofluorine chemistry
- Workplaces: N. D. Zelinsky Institute of Organic Chemistry
- Doctoral advisors: Sema Leybovich Ioffe, Vladimir Alexandrovich Tartakovsky
- Website: dilmanlab.ru

Alexander Davidovich Dilman (Russian: Алекса́ндр Дави́дович Ди́льман) is a Russian organic chemist and is a professor of the Russian Academy of Sciences. Dilman is currently a Head of the Laboratory of Functional Organic Compounds at N. D. Zelinsky Institute of Organic Chemistry of the Russian Academy of Sciences (ZIOC RAS). Since 2022, he is a Corresponding Member of the Russian Academy of Sciences.

== Biography ==
Dilman was born in Moscow in 1976. At the age of 15, he attended the Moscow Chemical Lyceum in order to dive deeper into chemistry. In 1993, Dilman attended the Higher Chemical College of the Russian Academy of Sciences. During his undergraduate research he studied the chemistry of nitro- and organosilicon compounds at the ZIOC RAS under the supervision of Vladimir Tartakovsky.

Dilman completed an internship in the group of Prof. Herbert Mayr at LMU Munich in 2000. The results he obtained in Germany became a part of his dissertation. In 2001, he defended his Ph.D. thesis on the topic "Chemistry of N,N-bis(silyloxy)enamines" under the supervision of Prof. Sema Ioffe. During a post-doctoral internship in Prof. Henri Kagan's laboratory Dilman studied the chemistry of rhodium and iridium carbene complexes in 2002.

Dilman began to work in the field of organofluorine chemistry at ZIOC RAS in 2003. In 2008, he defended his Dr. Sci. dissertation connected with the development of new methods for the synthesis of fluorinated amines. In 2011 Dilman became the head of the Laboratory of Functional Organic Compounds at ZIOC RAS.

== Research ==
Dilman's early works are related to the chemistry of silanes containing a perfluorinated group, alongside studies on reactivity to enamines, imines, iminium salts N-benzoyl hydrazones. A significant part of the research is devoted to the introduction of a trifluoromethyl group by means of a Ruppert-Prakash reagent, a difluoromethyl moiety from difluorocarbene and transformations of α,α-difluorinated phosphonium salts. The development of methods for the introduction of CF_{3}– and CF_{2}H– groups is important for medicinal chemistry.

Recently photoredox catalysis became the main research area of the Dilman group. Utilising visible light energy in chemical reactions allows many procedures to be more environmentally-friendly and widely available to organic chemists. Research of his group mainly involves development of approaches for radical functionalization of alkenes, imines, hydrazones and the activation of radical C–H bonds. Other research interests are connected with the activation of carboxylic acids under acridine photocatalytic conditions as well as photochemical transformations of polyfluorinated aryl sulfides.

== Teaching ==
Since 2003, Dilman, together with William Smith has taught the course "Organic Synthesis" at ZIOC RAS. In 2009, he continued to lecture on this discipline together with his student V. V. Levin. A book based on the course, co-authored with W. A. Smith, was published in 2008.

== Awards ==
- Diploma of the 1st degree of the 6th Mendeleev Competition of scientific research works of chemistry students (1995)
- Medal of the Russian Academy of Sciences for Young Scientists (1999) (together with A. A. Tishkov).
- Laureate of grants from the President of the Russian Federation to support young scientists
- Laureate of the Foundation for the Promotion of National Science (2008)
- Liebig Lecturer Award of the German Chemical Society (2019)
