= Alexander Tschich =

German politician (born 1992)

Member of the Landtag of Mecklenburg-Vorpommern
- Assuming office 20 October 2026
- Succeeding: Christian Winter
- Constituency: Ludwigslust-Parchim III

Personal details
- Born: 1992 (age 33–34)
- Party: Alternative for Germany

Alexander Tschich (born 1992) is a German politician who was elected member of the Landtag of Mecklenburg-Vorpommern in 2026. He has served as chairman of Generation Germany in Mecklenburg-Vorpommern since 2026.
