= Elaine Hsiao =

American biologist and academic

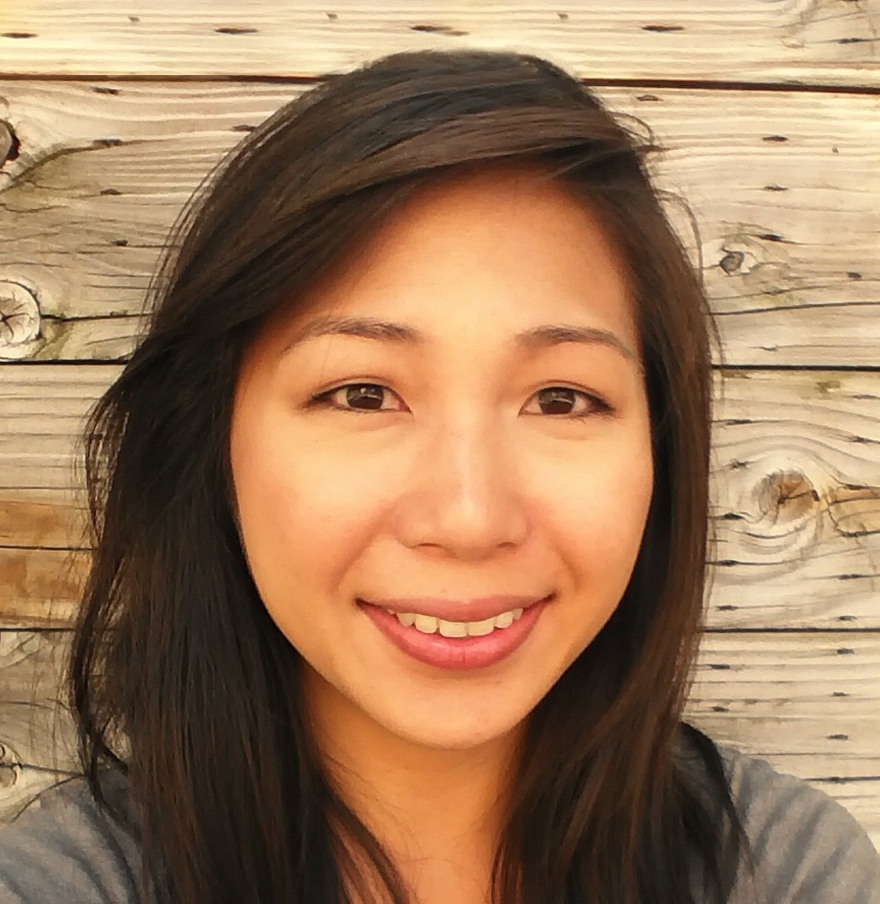
- Hsiao in 2014
- Born: Elaine Yih-Nien Hsiao
- Education: University of California, Los Angeles (BS); California Institute of Technology (PhD)
- Scientific career
- Fields: Biology
- Workplaces: University of California, Los Angeles; California Institute of Technology
- Thesis: Brain, Gut and Immune Interactions in Autism Spectrum Disorder (2013)
- Doctoral advisor: Paul Patterson
- Website: hsiao.science

Elaine Yih-Nien Hsiao is an American biologist who is Professor in Biological Sciences at University of California, Los Angeles. Her research considers the microbes that impact human health. She was a 2022 Laureate for the Blavatnik Awards for Young Scientists.

== Early life and education ==
Hsiao was born to a Taiwanese American family. She was an undergraduate student in microbiology at the University of California, Los Angeles. After graduating she moved to California Institute of Technology, where she focused on neurobiology in the laboratory of Paul Patterson. At CalTech, she studied the neuroimmune system, and the molecular mechanisms that underpin disorders in neurodevelopment.

== Research and career ==
Hsiao moved to the research groups of Rustem F. Ismagilov and Sarkis Mazmanian. In 2015, Hsiao joined the UCLA Department of Integrative Biology and Physiology as an assistant professor. She was promoted to an associate professor in 2020. Hsiao is interested in microbes and how they regulate brain development and behavior. These microbes impact the brain by serving as moderators for neurotransmitters and neuropeptides, and are involved with complicated neurological behaviors. Alterations in the levels of these neuro-active molecules are involved in autism and Parkinson's disease.

Hsiao investigated how the maternal microbiome impacts fetal brain development. She found that depleting the microbiota of a maternal gut damaged fetal brain development, altering the specific genes which are switched on and how axons between neurons formed. She showed that there were fewer axons which connect the thalamus to the cortex, and gave rise to sensory impairments.

In 2013, Hsiao delivered a TEDx talk on how microbes can alter brain function.

=== Awards and honours ===
- 2014 Forbes 30 Under 30
- 2015 Kavli Fellow of the National Academy of Sciences
- 2017 Life Sciences Excellence Award
- 2018 Ben Barres Early Career Acceleration Award
- 2018 New York Stem Cell Foundation Robertson Neuroscience Investigator
- 2019 UCLA Life Sciences Excellence Award – Excellence in Research, Assistant Professor
- 2021 Scialog Fellow
- 2022 New York Academy of Sciences (Takeda Pharmaceuticals) Innovators in Science Award in Gastroenterology
- 2022 Blavatnik National Awards for Young Scientists

=== Selected publications ===
- Elaine Y Hsiao; Sara W McBride; Sophia Hsien; et al. (5 December 2013). "Microbiota modulate behavioral and physiological abnormalities associated with neurodevelopmental disorders". Cell. 155 (7): 1451–1463. doi:10.1016/j.cell.2013.11.024. ISSN 0092-8674. PMC 3897394. PMID 24315484. Wikidata Q29617111.
- Jessica M Yano; Kristie Yu; Gregory P Donaldson; et al. (1 April 2015). "Indigenous bacteria from the gut microbiota regulate host serotonin biosynthesis". Cell. 161 (2): 264–276. doi:10.1016/j.cell.2015.02.047. ISSN 0092-8674. PMC 4393509. PMID 25860609. Wikidata Q35366986.
- Thomas C Fung; Christine A Olson; Elaine Y Hsiao (16 January 2017). "Interactions between the microbiota, immune and nervous systems in health and disease". Nature Neuroscience. 20 (2): 145–155. doi:10.1038/nn.4476. ISSN 1097-6256. PMC 6960010. PMID 28092661. Wikidata Q39090621.
