= Paul Patterson (neuroscientist) =

Neuroscientist (1943–2014)

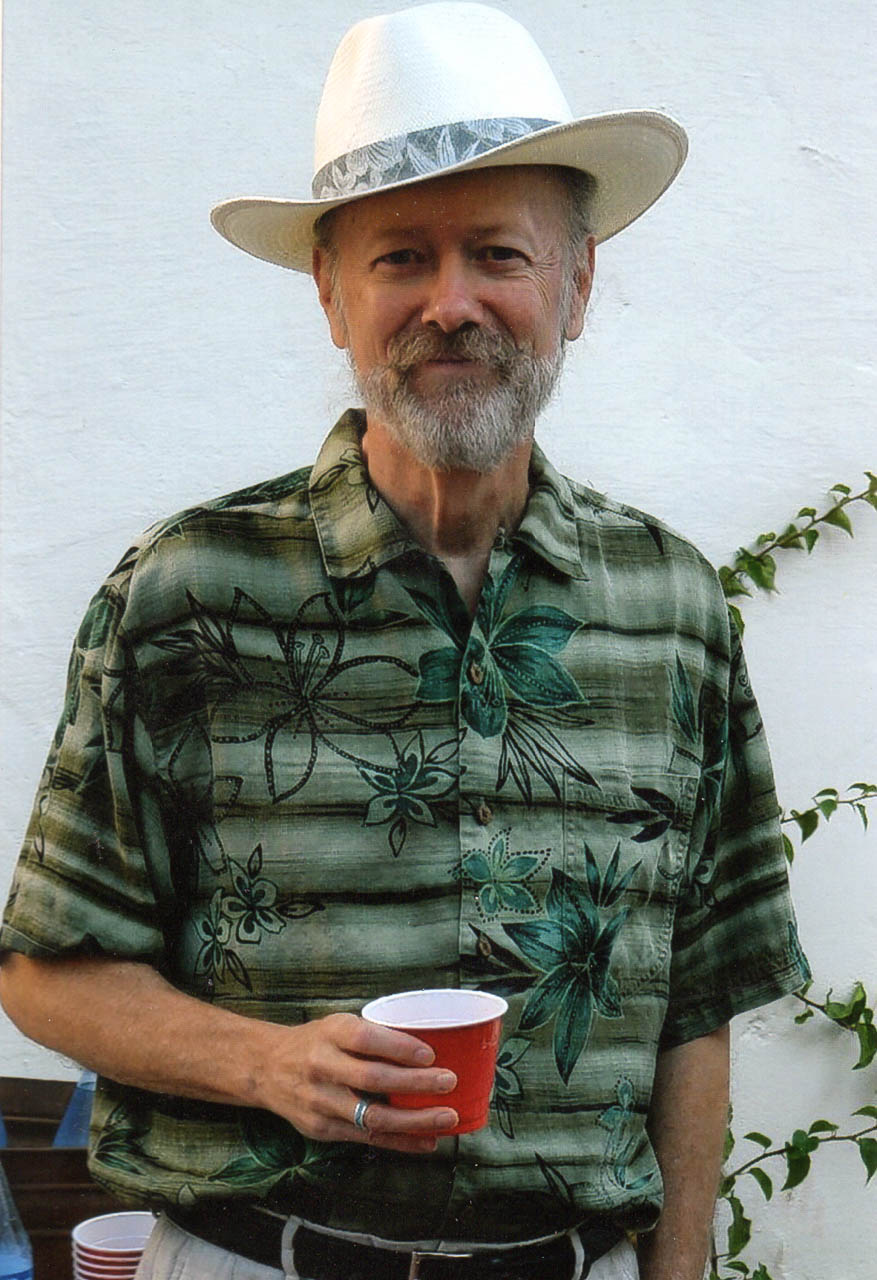
- Patterson in 2007
- Born: October 22, 1943; Chicago, Illinois, US
- Died: June 25, 2014 (aged 70); Altadena, California, US
- Resting place: UCLA Medical School
- Education: Grinnell College; Johns Hopkins University
- Spouse: Carolyn Patterson
- Children: Paul Clair Patterson
- Scientific career
- Fields: Neuroscience, neuroimmunology
- Workplaces: Harvard University, California Institute of Technology
- Doctoral advisor: William Lennarz
- Doctoral students: Elaine Hsiao

Paul H. Patterson (October 22, 1943 – June 25, 2014) was an American neuroscientist and the Anne P. and Benjamin F. Biaggini Professor of Biological Sciences at the California Institute of Technology.

== Early life and education ==
Paul Patterson was born in Chicago, Illinois, to Paul and Marge Patterson. His uncle, Clair Patterson, was a scientist who influenced Paul’s future career. He grew up in the suburbs of Chicago, moved to Minnesota during high school, and attended Grinnell College for his undergraduate studies. He completed his PhD in biology at Johns Hopkins University with William Lennarz in 1970. He then moved to Harvard University as a post-doctoral scholar, and was promoted to assistant professor of neuroscience at the Harvard Medical School. He worked on the functioning of neurons, showing that the brain is in fact “plastic” and the functions of neurons can be changed by their environment and stimulation.

== Career ==
In 1983, Paul joined the California Institute of Technology as a professor of neuroscience. He continued his work on the mutability of the peripheral nervous system, discovering the role that the leukemia inhibitory factor ("LIF"), a cytokine previously identified based on its immunological function, played in brain function. This discovery led to him being known as a “neuroimmunologist.”

Paul co-edited a book called "The Origins of Schizophrenia" in 2011. He also published a book on neuroimmunology, Infectious Behavior: Brain-Immune Connections in Autism, Schizophrenia and Depression, and continued to blog on topics related to these fields until his death in June 2014.

Throughout his career, he focused on human diseases, such as Huntington's Disease (HD), Parkinson's Disease, and Alzheimers. He was on the scientific board for the Hereditary Disease Foundation for almost 30 years. He received research funding from the National Institutes of Health (NIH). In addition, he received research funding from non-profit organizations such as Autism Speaks, the McKnight Foundation, the Simons Foundation, the Hereditary Disease Foundation, and private donors.

He was committed to training young scientists and doctors. He established the MD/PhD programs between Caltech and USC, and Caltech and UCLA. He spearheaded training programs at Caltech for the California Institute of Regenerative Medicine (CIRM), obtaining grants to support students researching stem cell science from neighboring institutions such as Pasadena City College, Cal Poly Pomona and CSULA.
