= Alexander Pilis =

Brazilian architect

Alexander Pilis is an architectural investigator, working under the aegis of "Architecture Parallax".

Pilis was born in Rio de Janeiro and lives-works in Barcelona, Toronto and São Paulo. Trained as an architect, he has taught at the University of Toronto in the School of Architecture and the Department of Fine Arts for 13 years. He taught the program the Metropolis Masters in Architecture and Urban Culture, a collaborative project between the Centre de Cultura Contemporània de Barcelona and the Pompeu Fabra University.

The Blind Architect: Visual Crisis is an extension, and a summation of his quarter-century of exploration into the nature and meaning of what he calls "Architecture Parallax". It is a research praxis that poses questions, how to think, articulate, and represent an ordering system that is not dependent upon a visual singularity.

== Works ==
=== Selected solo exhibitions ===
- 2010 WhiteBox@Michael Gibson Gallery, London, Ontario, Canada.
- 2010 Peak Gallery, Toronto, Ontario, Canada.
- 2010 Mcmaster Museum of Art, Hamilton, Ontario, Canada.
- 2006 Pinacoteca do Estado de São Paulo, SP Brazil.
- 2006 Peak Gallery, Toronto, Ontario, Canada.
- 2005 ADN, Barcelona Spain.
- 2003 Museum of Installation, The Modern Tate, Sir John Soane Museum, London Eye, The Old Operating Theater, Laban, Old Greenwich Royal Observatory and in Collaboration with The Metropolitan University of London, Fine Arts department, London UK.
- 1999 Box 23, Barcelona Spain.
- 1998 Institut fur Auslandsbeziehungen (I.F.A.), Stuttgart, Germany.
- 1998 The Gallery, UK.
- 1996 Akademie Schloss Solitude, Schloss Halle, Stuttgart, Germany.
- 1995 Chopo Museum, Mexico DF, Mexico.
- 1994 Winnipeg Art Gallery, Winnipeg, Manitoba, Canada.
- 1993 YYZ Gallery, Toronto, Ontario, Canada.
- 1993 Contemporary Museum of Art, São Paulo Brazil.
- 1992 Western Front Gallery, Vancouver, British Columbia, Canada.
- 1990 Museu de Arte Contemporanea, São Paulo Brazil.
- 1988 The Power Plant Art Gallery Toronto, Ontario, Canada.

=== Guest artist in residence ===
- 2005 The Banff Centre For The Arts, Banff, Alberta, Canada
- 2004 The Banff Centre For The Arts, Banff, Alberta, Canada.
- 1998 Guernsey College of Art & Design, UK.
- 1996–07 Akademie Schloss Solitude, Stuttgart, Germany.
- 1994 The Banff Centre For The Arts, Banff, Alberta, Canada.

=== International biennial ===
- 2008 28th São Paulo Biennial, SP, Brazil. Architecture Parallax Appear-Disappear.
- 2002 25Th. International Art-Architecture Biennial, São Paulo Brazil. Architecture Parallax Visual Crisis, Film/Video/Audio Departments. Canada Council.
- 1987 19Th. São Paulo Biennial, São Paulo Brazil. Theoretical Projections

=== Curatorial ===
- 2009 MASP SP Brazil and Instituto of Architecture Milan Italy.
- 2003 La Caixa Fundació Forum, Barcelona Spain.
- 1996 Crises of Abstraction, co-curator with Ihor Holubizky, S.S.: Stuttgart, Germany
- 1996 Architecture Parallax SnackLunch, St. Norbert Arts & Cultural Centre, Winnipeg, Manitoba, Canada.
- 1995 Parallax Workshop, St. Norbert Arts & Cultural Centre, Winnipeg, Manitoba, Canada.
- 1989 A 5th year architecture students thesis, traveling Brazil,The Institute for Architects of Brazil, Co-Curator with Larry Richards. University of Waterloo: Co-op Laboratory
- 1986 Between Here & There: The Memory of Disruption - Archimemoria, SESC - Fabrica da Pompeia Art Gallery, São Paulo.

=== Selected recent group exhibitions ===
- 2006 La Panera, Lleida, Spain.
- 2006 Koldo, San Sebastian, Spain.
- 2003 Alucine, Toronto, Ontario, Canada
- 2003 Fundació Tàpies, Barcelona, Spain.
- 2002 The Mendel Public Art Gallery, Saskatoon, Saskatchewan, Canada.
- 2001 SESC Fabrica da Pompeia, São Paulo, Brazil.

=== Publications ===
- 2010 "Architecture Parallax : The Blind Architect Meets Rembrandt", http://www.mcmaster.ca/museum/.
- 2008 "Architecture Parallax : The Blind Architect", Lulu.com International.
- 2008 "Architecture Parallax : São Paulo", Lulu.com International.
- 2008 "Architecture Parallax : São Paulo - Maddest About You", Lulu.com International.
- 2006 Centro Cultural Koldo Mitxelena, San Sebastian, Spain.
- 2006 Centre d'Art La Panera, Lleida, Spain.
- 2006 "São Paulo, Memory of Disruption", an edition of 80 issues. (published by Pinacoteca do Estado de São Paulo with a Canada Council Grant.)
- 2004 "What you See is not What you are Thinking you are Seeing", Tàpies Fundació, Barcelona Spain.
- 1998 Architektur - Parallaxe : Turm Tisch Ture, I.F.A., Stuttgart Germany.
- 1998 Architecture Parallax : Scopic Flash Guernsey Gallery G. Britain.
- 1996 Parallax History, Akademie Schloss Solitude, Stuttgart Germany.
- 1995 Architecture-Parallax : SnackLunch, St. Norbert Cultural & Art Centre Winnipeg.
- 1995 Parallax : The Legacy of the Future is the Burden of the Past, Museo del Chopo Mexico DF, Mexico.
- 1995 View - Bi Occulus, Akademie Schloss Solitude, Stuttgart Germany.
- 1994 Architecture Body Parallax, Winnipeg Art Gallery, Winnipeg.
- 1990 Architecture Ultra Mundane, published by the Museo de Arte Moderna S.P.
- 1989 G-7: Architecture Snack Lunch, The Power Plant Art Gallery, Toronto.
- 1988 Architecture X-ray, New Observations, VOL. 55, New York
- 1986 Entre Espaço : A Memoria da Disruptura, Archimemoria Canada.
