= Reviews of Modern Physics =

Peer-reviewed journal

- Discipline: Physics
- Language: English
- Edited by: Sujit Datta

Publication details
- History: 1929–present
- Publisher: American Physical Society
- Frequency: Quarterly
- Impact factor: 44.1 (2022)

Standard abbreviations
- ISO 4: Rev. Mod. Phys.
- MathSciNet: Rev. Modern Phys.

Indexing
- CODEN: RMPHAT
- ISSN: 0034-6861 (print); 1539-0756 (web)
- LCCN: 31021290
- OCLC no.: 5975699

Links
- Journal homepage; Online access; Online archive

Reviews of Modern Physics (often abbreviated RMP) is a quarterly peer-reviewed scientific journal published by the American Physical Society. Established in 1929, the journal publishes review articles, usually by established researchers, on all aspects of physics and related fields. It is one of the most prestigious journals of its kind today. Its intended readers include not just professional physicists, but also university students, university and high-school instructors, as well as scientifically literate members of the general public. The RMP occasionally publishes articles concerning topics that are also of interest to people outside of physics, such as the safety of light-water nuclear reactors, the feasibility of the Strategic Defense Initiative (Star Wars), and the nature of the deoxyribonucleic acid (DNA) molecule.

Over the years, the editors of the journal included John Torrence Tate (1929–41, 1947), who worked on antisubmarine warfare during the Second World War; Samuel Goudsmit (1951–57), co-discover of quantum spin; and Edward Condon (1951–68), member of the Manhattan Engineer District. Sujit Datta, a multidisciplinary scientist, is the current editor-in-chief.

During the early years of the journal, the United States was supplanting Germany as the leading nation for physics, and English was becoming more common in scientific communications. While review papers were nothing new, they were published only sporadically. The RMP was the first of its kind, fulfilling an unmet need among physicists. At that time, the focus was on reviewing the research literature on largely established branches of physics. Fields in which there were controversies or unanswered questions were generally excluded. By the 1950s and 1960s, however, the journal faced falling readership and the editorial board decided to expand the scope of the journal to include topics at the frontier of research. Former editor Edward Condon was of the opinion that writing review articles should be part of the training of graduate students in physics and one of the responsibilities of physicists.

Among the most cited papers in the Reviews of Modern Physics are three by Hans Bethe on nuclear physics (1936–7), one by Enrico Fermi on quantum electrodynamics (1932), one by Subrahmanyan Chandrasekhar on stochastic processes in astronomy and physics (1943); one by Howard Percy Robertson on relativistic cosmology (1931), two by Clemens Roothaan on molecular orbitals (1951) and electronic systems (1960), and one by Kurt Alder, Aage Bohr, Torben Huus, Ben Mottelson, and Aage Winther on nuclear structure (1956). Some of the top papers in this journal were written by Nobel laureates. Since the 1960s, multiple authorship has become more frequent. Authors of the most cited papers were affiliated with Bell Laboratories; the University of Chicago; the Argonne National Laboratory, the National Bureau of Standards (now the National Institute of Standards and Technology); and the University of California at Berkeley, Irvine, and San Diego. In the twenty-first century, the journal has published papers on quantum foundations, as well as the development of the Standard Model of particle physics.
