= Aleksandr Nikolayev (disambiguation) =

Alexander Nikolayev (1918 – 2009) was a Russian World War II hero

Aleksandr Nikolayev may also refer to:

- Aleksandr Andreyevich Nikolayev (1905–1949), Soviet naval officer
- Aleksandr Nikolayev (canoeist) (born 1990), Russian canoeist
- Aleksandr Nikolayev (footballer) (born 1993), Russian/Ukrainian football player
- Aleksandr Nikolayev (painter) (1897–1957), Soviet painter of Russian origin, who lived and worked in Uzbek SSR
- Aleksandr Nikolayev (pianist) (1903–1980), Russian pianist and musicologist
- Russian landing ship Aleksandr Nikolayev, an Ivan Rogov-class landing ship of the Soviet, later Russian, Navy
