= Oleksandr Zubov =

Ukrainian chess grandmaster (born 1983)

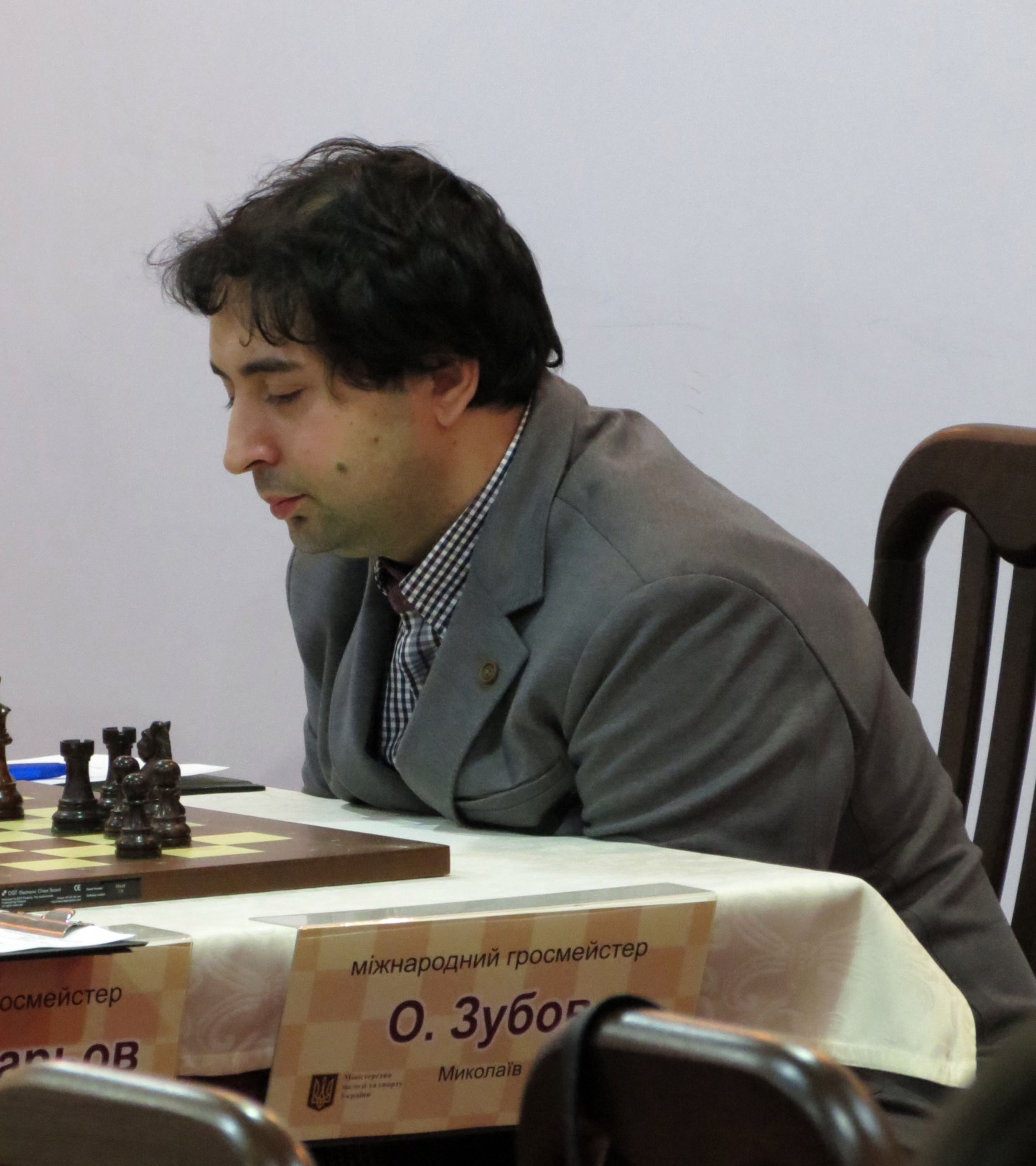

Personal information
- Born: April 4, 1983 (age 43) Mykolaiv, Ukraine

Chess career
- Country: Ukraine
- Title: Grandmaster (2011)
- FIDE rating: 2598 (July 2026)
- Peak rating: 2630 (September 2015)

Oleksandr Olehovych Zubov (Ukrainian: Олександр Олегович Зубов; born 4 April 1983), is a Ukrainian chess player and Grandmaster. He received the title in 2011, after achieving the title of International Master in 1999.
