= Aleksander Gabelic =

Swedish politician (born 1965)

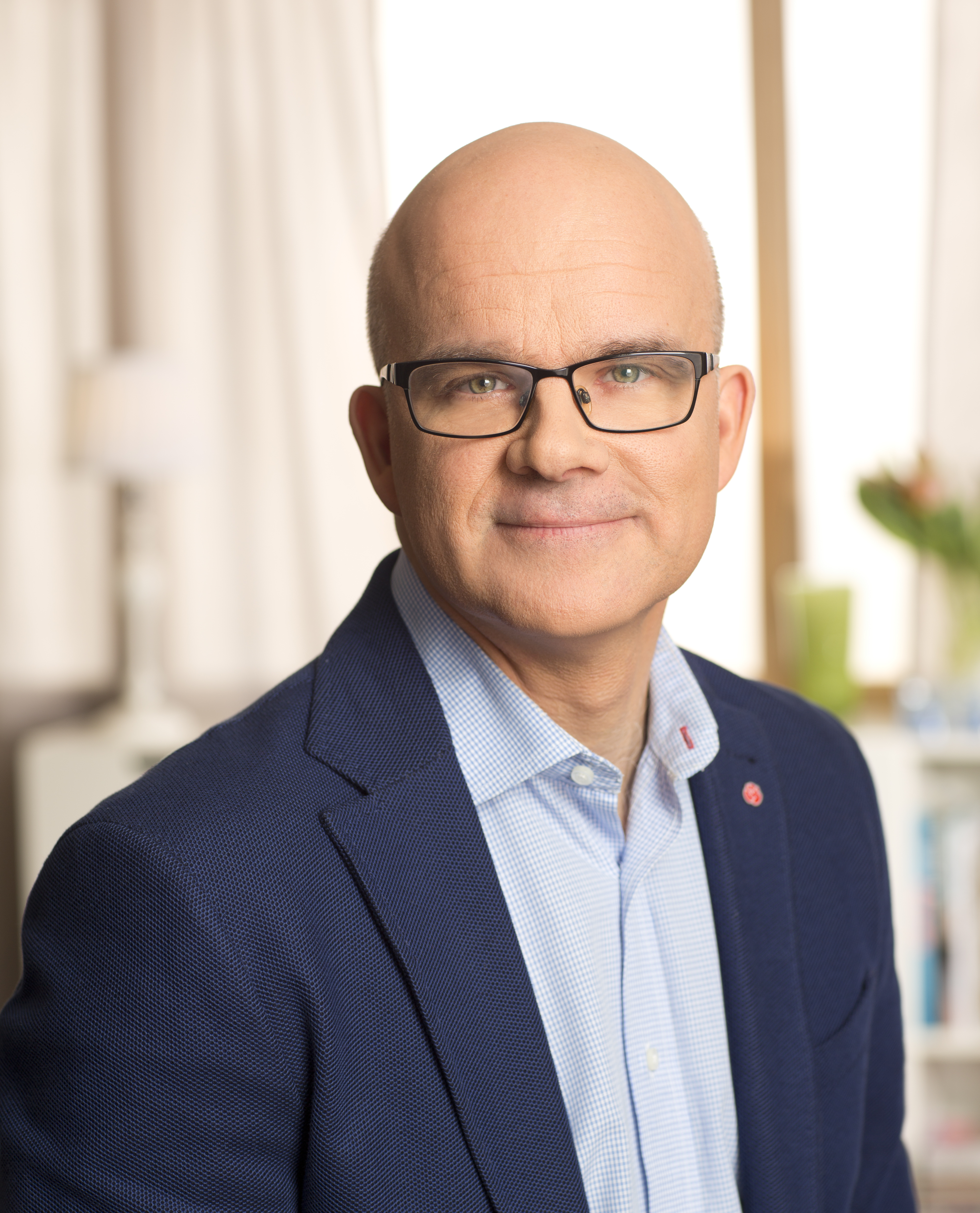
- Gabelic in May 2014

Member of the European Parliament
- In office 4 April 2018 – 1 July 2019
- Preceded by: Jens Nilsson
- Constituency: Sweden

Member of the Riksdag
- In office 2 October 2006 – 4 October 2010
- Constituency: Östergötland County

Personal details
- Born: 17 September 1965 (age 60) Malmö, Sweden
- Party: Social Democratic Party
- Other political affiliations: Progressive Alliance of Socialists and Democrats

Aleksander Gabelic (born 17 September 1965) is a Swedish politician and former member of the Riksdag, the national legislature. A member of the Social Democratic Party, he represented Östergötland County between October 2006 and October 2010. He was a member of the European Parliament between April 2018 and July 2019. He was a member of the municipal council in Linköping Municipality and chairman of the Swedish UN Federation (Svenska FN-förbundet).
