= Alexander Exarch =

Alexander Exarch Александър Стоилов Боев AlexanderStoilov Boev
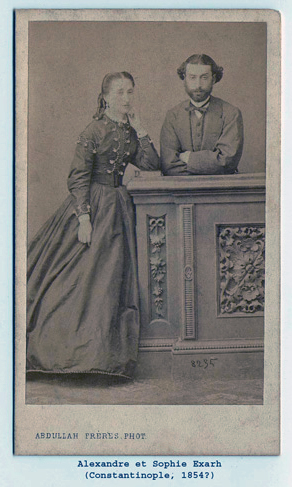
- Born: 1810; Stara Zagora, Ottoman Empire
- Died: 27 September 1891 (aged 80–81); Sofia, Principality of Bulgaria

Alexander Exarch (Bulgarian: Александър Екзарх, 1810 – 27 September 1891) was a Bulgarian revivalist, publicist and journalist, and an active participant in the struggle for an independent Bulgarian Exarchate.

In 1841, he accompanied as a translator Jérôme-Adolphe Blanqui, sent by the French government to investigate the consequences of the Niš rebellion (1841). Blanqui reflects it in his diary as Bulgarian, pointing to Niš as the capital of Bulgaria. He strongly opposed the insinuation of Ioannis Kolettis (at that time the Greek ambassador to Paris) that the uprising was Greek. In 1842 - 1846, he sent several memoirs (memos) to the Western European governments to improve the situation of the Bulgarians.

With financial assistance from Russia, he published in Constantinople the Bulgarian „Constantinople newspaper” (1848 - 1862), and served as editor-in-chief 1850 and 1860.

After the Liberation of Bulgaria he was twice a candidate for Head of State (Prince) of Bulgaria (1879, 1886).
