= Alexander (artists) =

Alexander (Gr. Ἀλέξανδρος) was the name of a number of different artists in ancient Greece and Rome:

- Alexander, a painter, one of whose productions was said by Johann Joachim Winckelmann to be extant, painted on a marble tablet which bears his name.
- Alexander, a son of king Perseus of Macedon, who was a skillful metalsmith.
- Marcus Lollius Alexander, an engraver of gems, whose name occurs in an inscription in Doni.
