= Aleksandr Nikolayev (footballer) =

Russian-Ukrainian footballer

Personal information
- Full name: Aleksandr Igorevich Nikolayev
- Date of birth: 11 May 1993 (age 33)
- Place of birth: Berdiansk, Ukraine
- Height: 1.74 m (5 ft 8 1/2 in)
- Position: Goalkeeper

Youth career
- –2009: FC Metalurh Zaporizhya

Senior career*
Years	Team	Apps	(Gls)
2010–2011	FC Dynamo Khmelnytskyi	0	(0)
2011–2012	FC Chornomorets Odesa	0	(0)
2013–2014	FC UkrAhroKom Holovkivka	10	(0)
2016–2017	FC Domodedovo Moscow	20	(0)
2017–2018	FC Kazanka Moscow	12	(0)
- * Club domestic league appearances and goals

Aleksandr Igorevich Nikolayev (Russian: Александр Игоревич Николаев; born 11 May 1993) is a Russian former football player. He also holds Ukrainian citizenship as Oleksandr Ihorovych Nikolayev (Ukrainian: Олександр Ігорович Ніколаєв).

== Club career ==
He made his debut in the Russian Professional Football League for FC Domodedovo Moscow on 2 September 2016 in a game against FC Kolomna.
