= Alexander Lychnus =

Ancient Greek poet

Alexander (Gr. Ἀλέξανδρος) surnamed Lychnus (Λύχνος), was an ancient Greek rhetorician and poet. He was a native of Ephesus, from which he is sometimes called Alexander Ephesius, and must have lived shortly before the time of Strabo (i.e., the 1st century BC), who mentions him among the more recent Ephesian authors, and also states that he took a part in the political affairs of his native city. Strabo ascribes to him a history, and poems of a didactic kind, viz. one on astronomy and another on geography, in which he describes the great continents of the world, treating of each in a separate work or book, which, as we learn from other sources, bore the name of the continent of which it contained an account. What kind of history it was that Strabo alludes to, is uncertain. The so-called Aurelius Victor quotes the first book of a history of the Marsic War by Alexander the Ephesian; but this authority is considered doubtful.

Some writers have supposed that this Alexander is the author of the history of the succession of Greek philosophers (αἱ τῶν φιλοσόφων διαδοχαί), which is often referred to by Diogenes Laërtius; but this work belonged probably to Alexander Polyhistor. His geographical poem, of which several fragments are still extant, is frequently referred to by Stephanus of Byzantium and others. Of his astronomical poem a fragment is still extant, which however has also been attributed to Alexander Aetolus, particularly by the scholars Thomas Gale and Johann Gottlob Schneider. It is highly probable that Cicero is speaking of Alexander Lychnus when he mentions an Alexander who he says is a bad poet, and a careless writer, but whose poems yet possess some factual information. The Greek text of his poem has been edited with a commentary by Christophe Cusset.
