= Alexander Hofmann =

German politician (born 1992)

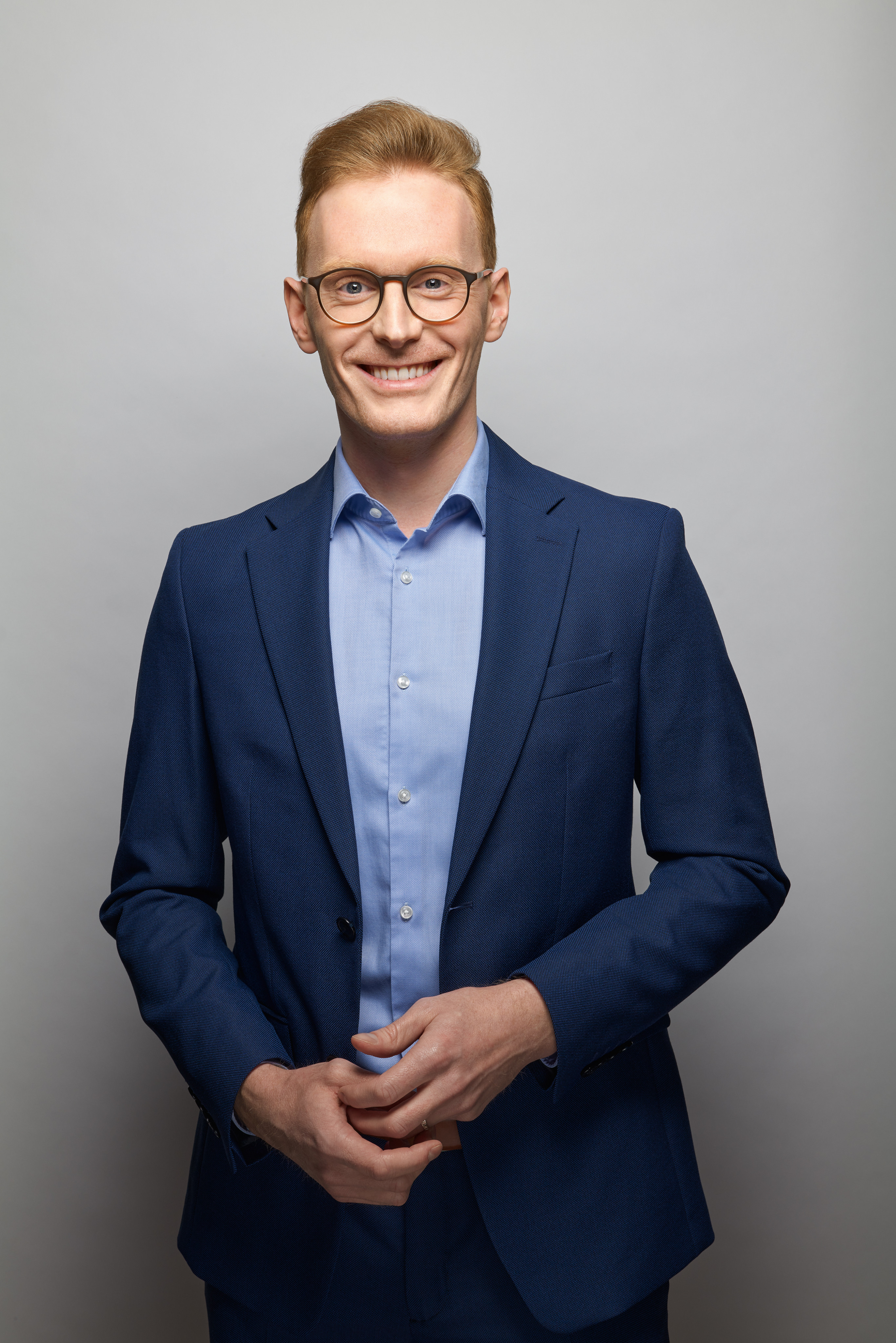
- Hofmann in 2023

Member of the Landtag of Hesse
- Incumbent
- Assumed office 18 January 2024

Personal details
- Born: 28 March 1992 (age 34)
- Party: Social Democratic Party (since 2013)

Alexander Hofmann (born 28 March 1992) is a German politician serving as a member of the Landtag of Hesse since 2024. He has served as chairman of the Social Democratic Party in Wiesbaden since 2023.
