= Alexander Khakhanov =

Georgian-Russian historian, archaeologist and scholar (1866–1912)

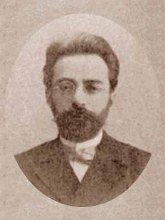
Alexander Khakhanov

Aleksandr Solomonovich Khakhanov (Russian: Александр Соломонович Хаханов) born Aleksandre Khakhanashvili (Georgian: ალექსანდრე ხახანაშვილი; January 3, 1866 – May 25, 1912) was a Georgian-Russian historian, archaeologist, and one of the most acclaimed scholars of Georgian literature.

He was born in Gori, Georgia, then part of Imperial Russia, and studied at Tbilisi Gymnasium. Having graduated from Moscow University in 1888, he delivered lectures on Georgian language and literature at Lazarev Institute of Oriental Languages from 1889 and at Moscow University from 1900. He authored numerous works on Georgian history and literature, including Очерки по истории грузинской словесности ("Studies in the History of Georgian Literature"), published in Russian from 1895 to 1907. Khakhanov translated several pieces of Georgian written and oral literature into Russian, and conducted extensive research in Georgia, Italy, France and England to reveal old Georgian manuscripts. In 1900, he published Histoire de Géorgie ("History of Georgia") in French. Khakhanov was elected to the Moscow Imperial Archeological Society in 1901 and the Georgian Historic and Ethnographic Society in 1907.
