= Justice Alexander =

Justice Alexander may refer to:

- Fritz W. Alexander II (1926–2000), judge of the New York Court of Appeals
- Donald G. Alexander (born 1942), justice of the Maine Supreme Judicial Court
- Gerry L. Alexander (born 1936), chief justice of the Supreme Court of Washington
- James P. Alexander (1883–1948), chief justice of Texas
- Joan K. Alexander (born 1961/62), justice of the Connecticut Supreme Court
- Julian P. Alexander (1887–1953), justice of the Supreme Court Mississippi
