= Sujit Datta =

Canadian-American polymath

Sujit Datta is a Canadian-American professor of chemical engineering, bioengineering, and biophysics at the California Institute of Technology. His research focuses on the physics of soft and living matter, including complex fluids, porous media, and microbial systems. His research has been covered in Quanta Magazine, Physics World, the Scientific American, and the Times of India.

In 2025, he was appointed Editor-in-Chief of Reviews of Modern Physics, a peer-reviewed journal published by the American Physical Society.

== Honors and awards ==
- LeRoy Apker Award (2008)
- ACS Unilever Award (2020)
- Allan P. Colburn Award (2023)
