= Aleksandre Pirtskhalaishvili =

Aleksandre Giorgis dze Pirtskhalaishvili (Georgian: ალექსანდრე გიორგის ძე ფირცხალაიშვილი; 1888 – 23 March 1965) was a Georgian, Soviet historian, Doctor of Philosophy (1942), and professor (1945). In 1915, he graduated from Kiev University, on Historical Faculty of Philology. In 1912 Pirtskhalaishvili went to Germany, and attended courses at Heidelberg University. After returning to Georgia he worked in pedagogy. In 1929 he was invited by the Tbilisi State University, where he lectured until his last days. He was exploring the history of 19th-century Georgia and Russian-Georgian relations. He died in 1965.
