= Alexander Isius =

Alexander (Ancient Greek: Ἀλέξανδρος), surnamed Isius (Ἴσιος), the chief commander of the Aetolians, was a man of considerable ability and eloquence for an Aetolian. In 205 BC, Alexander Isios opposed Dorimachus and Scopas, who were elected by the Aetolians as legislators to reform Aetolian legislation. In 198 BC he was present at a colloquy held at Nicaea on the Maliac Gulf, and spoke against Philip V of Macedon, saying that the king ought to be compelled to quit Greece, and to restore to the Aetolians the towns which had formerly been subject to them. Philip, indignant at such a demand being made by an Aetolian, answered him in a speech from his ship. Soon after this meeting, he was sent as ambassador of the Aetolians to Rome, where, together with other envoys, he was to treat with the senate about peace, but at the same time to bring accusations against Philip. In 197 BC, Alexander again took part in a meeting, at which T. Quinctius Flamininus with his allies and king Philip were present, and at which peace with Philip was discussed. Alexander dissuaded his friends from any peaceful arrangement with Philip. In 195 BC, when a congress of all the Greek states that were allied with Rome was convoked by Flamininus at Corinth, for the purpose of considering the war that was to be undertaken against the Spartan king Nabis, Alexander spoke against the Athenians, and also insinuated that the Romans were acting fraudulently towards Greece. When in 189 BC, Marcus Fulvius Nobilior, after his victory over Antiochus III the Great, was expected to march into Aetolia, the Aetolians sent envoys to Athens and Rhodes; and Alexander Isius, together with Phaneas and Lycopus, were sent to Rome to sue for peace. Alexander, now an old man, was at the head of the embassy; but he and his colleagues were made prisoners in Cephallenia by the Epeirotes, for the purpose of extorting a heavy ransom. Alexander, however, although he was very wealthy, refused to pay it, and was accordingly kept in captivity for some days, after which he was liberated, at the command of the Romans, without any ransom.
