= Oleksandr Berestianyi =

Ukrainian poet (1954–2025)

- Олександр Берестяний
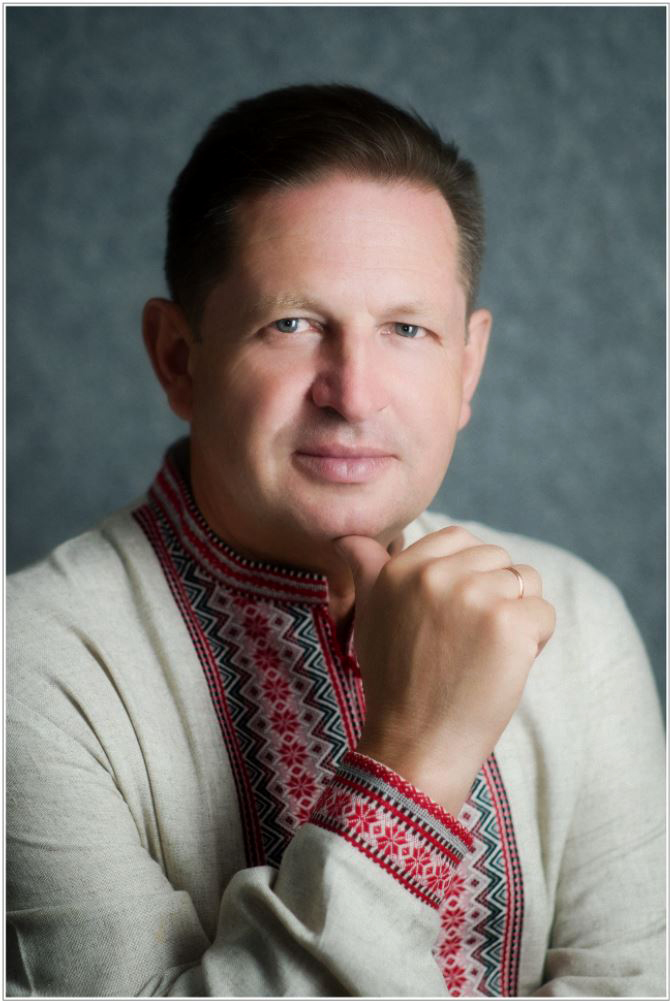
- Born: Oleksandr Mykolayovych Berestianyi; 11 August 1954; Okhotsk, Khabarovsk Krai, USSR
- Died: 1 August 2025 (aged 70)
- Occupation: Poet

Oleksandr Mykolayovych Berestianyi (Ukrainian: Олександр Миколайович Берестяний; 11 August 1954 – 1 August 2025) was a Ukrainian poet.

== Life and career ==
Berestianyi was born on 11 August 1954 in Okhotsk, Khabarovsk Krai, Russian SFSR, USSR. He was a member of the National Union of Journalists of Ukraine, the National Union of Writers of Ukraine, and throughout his career, he published a number of poetry collections, including "The ABC of Feelings", "From Someone's Light Hand", "Not Yet Evening", "Maidan. War", "Revolution of Dignity", and "Our Word is a Spiritual Sword".

In 2018, he published a children's book, titled "Excited World".

Berestianyi died after a serious illness on 1 August 2025, at the age of 70.
