= Alexander Henn =

German anthropologist

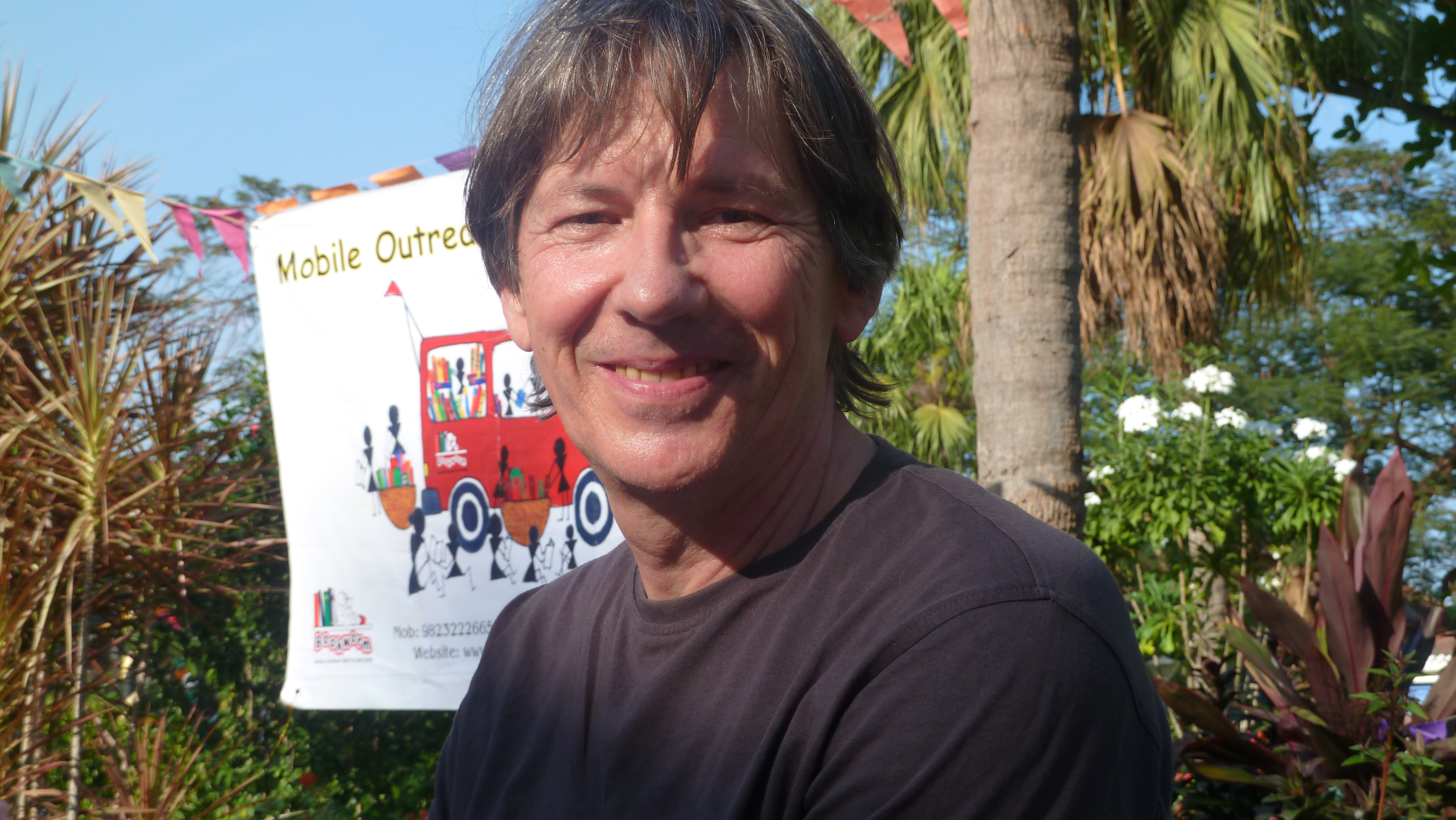
Alexander Henn

Alexander Henn is a German anthropologist and Professor for Religious Studies at the School of Historical, Philosophical & Religious Studies Arizona State University in Tempe, Arizona. He is also known for his research done on religion in Goa, India.

== Education ==
He has done his habilitation in Cultural Anthropology, Ruprecht-Karls-Universität, Heidelberg, 2000. He also holds a Ph.D. in Anthropology from the Johannes-Gutenberg Universität in Mainz, which he completed in 1988.

== Positions held ==
Since 2005 Henn is Associate Professor for Religious Studies, Arizona State University in Tempe, Arizona. From 2000 to 2005, he was an adjunct professor at the Ruprecht-Karls University in Heidelberg, Germany, Department of Anthropology. Between 2000 and 2001, he was also a visiting professor at Goa University, India, Department of Sociology. From 2000 to 2001 he held the post of adjunct professor, Ruprecht-Karls University at Heidelberg, Germany, in the Department of Anthropology. From 1988 to 1999, he was an assistant professor at the same university's South Asia Institute and between 1990 and 1991, a visiting lecturer and research fellow at the University of Delhi's Department of Sociology.

== Publications ==
His publications include:

=== Books ===
- Hindu-Catholic Encounters in Goa. Religion, Colonialism and Modernity, Indiana University Press, 2014
- Rituals in an Unstable World: Contingency – Embodiment - Hybridity, (eds. Alexander Henn and Klaus-Peter Koepping) Frankfurt, Oxford, New York 2008: Peter Lang
- Wachheit der Wesen: Politik, Ritual und Kunst der Akkulturation in Goa, Münster, Hamburg, London 2003: LIT-Verlag
- Reisen in vergangene Gegenwart. Geschichte und Geschichtlichkeit der Nicht-Europäer im Denken des 19. Jahrhunderts: die Erforschung des Sudan, Berlin 1988: Dietrich Reimer

=== Chapters and articles ===
- Ritual, Emotion and Healing in Post-Colonial Settings, in: Christian Wulff and Axel Michaels, eds. Ritual and Emotion, 2000 words, New Delhi 2011: Routledge
- Pictorial Encounter. Iconoclasm and Syncretism at India's Western Coast in: Christiane Brosius and Roland Wenzlhuemer (eds.), Transcultural Turbulences: Interdisciplinary Ex-plorations of Flows of Images and Media, Vienna 2011: Springer,
- Jesuit Rhetorics: Translation and Conversion in Early-Modern Goa, in: Ivo Strecker, Christian Meyer, Felix Girke, The Constitutive Interplay Between Rhetoric and Culture, 6000 words, Oxford / New York 2011: Berghahn
- Hindu Traditions in Goa, in: Encyclopedia of Hinduism, vol. I, ed. Knut A. Jacobson, Leyden 2009: Brill
- Crossroads of Religions: Shrines, Mobility, and Urban Space in Goa, in: International Journal for Urban and Regional Research, special issue (eds. Smirti Srinivas and Mary Hancock) 2008/32.3 S 658–70
- The Lord of Mapusa: Genesis of an Urban God in Goa, in: Purusartha 2006/25, pgs. 31-47
- Gods and Saints in Goa: Cultural Diversity and Local Religion, in: Malik, A., Feldhaus, A., Brueckner, H. (eds): In the Company of Gods. In Memoriam Guenther-Dietz Sontheimer, Delhi: 2005: Manohar, pgs. 83-104
- Incorporando o divino: iconografia religiosa, espaço sociologico e história política em Goa, in: Oriente. Revista Quadrimestral da Fundação Oriente, Lisboa 2003/4: 26-34
- The Becoming of Goa. Space and Culture in the Emergence of a Multicultural Lifeworld, in: Lusotopie: Lusophonies asiatiques, Asiatiques en lusophonies, Paris 2000/1, pgs.333-339

=== Films ===
Staying Awake for God. Introducing the Jagor. Documentary with Alito Siqueira and Gasper D’Souza 15 min., 2010, http://www.vimeo.com/12507263
