= Saint Alexander =

Saint Alexander may refer to one of several saints including:

- Pope Alexander I (died 115), bishop of Rome from c. 107 – c. 115 and hieromartyr
- Alexander (101–165), one of the seven sons of Felicitas of Rome
- Epipodius and Alexander (died 178), martyrs in Lyon
- Alexander of Jerusalem (died 251), bishop of Jerusalem and hieromartyr
- Alexander of Comana (died c. 251), bishop of Comana
- Alexander of Rome (died c. 289), martyr
- Alexander (died 290), a martyr and companion of Saint Victor of Marseilles
- Alexander of Bergamo (died c. 303), martyr and patron saint of Bergamo
- Alexander (died 320), one of the Forty Martyrs of Sebaste
- Pope Alexander I of Alexandria (died 326 or 328), Patriarch of Alexandria
- Alexander of Constantinople (c. 240–337), bishop of Byzantium and first bishop of Constantinople
- Sisinnius, Martyrius and Alexander (died 405), martyrs

== Eastern Orthodox ==
- Alexander Nevsky (1220–1263), Grand Prince of Novgorod and Vladimir
- Alexander Svirsky (1448–1533), Russian hegumen
- Alexander Hotovitzky (1872–1937), Russian hieromartyr
- Alexander of Munich (1917–1943), or Alexander Schmorell, Russian member of the White Rose resistance group and neomartyr

== Roman Catholic ==
- Alexander Sauli (1535–1592), the "Apostle of Corsica", member of an illustrious Lombard family
