= Hera Alexandros =

Alexandros (Gr. Ἀλέξανδρος), the "defender of men", was an epithet of the Greek goddess Hera, under which she was worshiped at Sicyon. A temple had been built there to Hera Alexandros by Adrastus after his flight from Argos.

== Epithet ==
Hera is referred to by various names one of which is the title Alexandros, "the defender of men", a name which she was worshiped under by the Sicyonian people. A temple had been built in her name by Adrastus, who was the legendary king of during the war of Seven against Thebes.
