= Alexander (sculptor) =

British sculptor, holographer, and conceptual artist

Alexander (February 1927 – March 2023) was a British sculptor, painter, holographer, and conceptual artist known for his experimental work in holography and large-scale public installations. His disciplines included stone sculpture, bronze casting, works on canvas, holography, and from roughly 1991 onward to combinations of those medium as well as other experimental art forms. His combined creative objective was to expand the boundaries of contemporary art and to provide inspiration and initiative for other artists to contribute to the expansion.

== Career ==
Educated at Saint Martin's School of Art and the Institute of Electrical Engineers in London, he worked with scientists, including Parameswaran Hariharan, at the CSIRO labs in Australia. His early work included the Crucifixion, which became the altarpiece for St. Martin's School chapel.

Among Alexander's most notable works is The Great Tower (1980), a 31-foot bronze sculpture at Rutland Water in England, which was considered one of the largest bronze-cast sculptures at the time of its installation. His public commissions also include Jubilee Oracle, commissioned and produced for the 25th Silver Jubilee Anniversary of the coronation of Queen Elizabeth, and Duet, a Carrara marble sculpture created for the University Hospital in Nottingham.

In the 1980s, Alexander pioneered what he termed "4D sculpture", incorporating optical and spatial effects, and later developed a series of large-format holograms. He invented a method for converting transmission holograms into reflection holograms. His holographic artworks were exhibited internationally, including at the Centre Pompidou, Musée de l'Holographie (Paris), and the 1987 São Paulo Art Biennial, where he represented Australia.

Alexander was also credited with producing one of the first pulse holographic motion pictures, La Belle et Environment la Bête (1986), and received the Progetto Leonardo award in Milan for his holographic film The Dream.

He lived and worked in Venice, California, until his death in 2023 at the age of 96.

== Conceptual Convergence - Art & Experiment ==
Alexander first came to international attention in the early 1970s’ as a sculptor and painter, and then in the 1980s’ as a holographic artist.

With the creation of his four-dimensional sculptures and his subsequent artistic experiments in holography, he further established his reputation as an experimental or conceptual artist. He invented a method for converting transmission holograms into reflection holograms.[17] He combined holographic imagery with more traditional media such as oil or acrylic on canvas or board.

"What interests me is to go beyond the limits of the real world, to create forms for those things that lie on the edge of consciousness; things that range from intuitive feelings to the ideas that have given rise to religious and spiritual beliefs in both primitive tribes and sophisticated cultures”.
