= Alex Sander =

Indonesian footballer (born 1997)

Personal information
- Full name: Alex Sander
- Date of birth: 1 January 1997 (age 29)
- Place of birth: Palembang, Indonesia
- Height: 1.75 m (5 ft 9 in)
- Position: Goalkeeper

Senior career*
Years	Team	Apps	(Gls)
2017–2018	Persela Lamongan	4	(0)
2019	Sriwijaya	0	(0)
2020–2021	PSS Sleman	0	(0)
2021	Mitra Kukar	10	(0)
2022	Kalteng Putra	2	(0)
2023–2024	PSDS Deli Serdang	0	(0)
- * Club domestic league appearances and goals as of 21:09, 30 September 2022 (UTC)

Alex Sander (born 1 January 1997) is an Indonesian professional footballer who last played as a goalkeeper for PSDS Deli Serdang.

== Career statistics ==
=== Club ===
As of 30 September 2022.

Club	Season	League			Cup		Other		Total	
Club	Season	Division	Apps	Goals	Apps	Goals	Apps	Goals	Apps	Goals
Persela Lamongan	2017	Liga 1	3	0	0	0	0	0	3	0
Persela Lamongan	2018	Liga 1	1	0	0	0	0	0	1	0
Sriwijaya	2019	Liga 2	0	0	0	0	0	0	0	0
PSS Sleman	2020	Liga 1	0	0	0	0	0	0	0	0
Mitra Kukar	2021	Liga 2	10	0	0	0	0	0	10	0
Kalteng Putra	2022	Liga 2	2	0	0	0	0	0	2	0
PSDS Deli Serdang	2023–24	Liga 2	0	0	0	0	0	0	0	0
Career total			16	0	0	0	0	0	16	0
