= Alexander Mohrenberg =

German politician (born 1995)

Member of the Hamburg Parliament
- Incumbent
- Assumed office 18 March 2020

Personal details
- Born: 22 March 1995 (age 31)
- Party: Social Democratic Party (since 2011)

Alexander Mohrenberg (born 22 March 1995) is a German politician serving as a member of the Hamburg Parliament since 2020. He has served as deputy chairman of the SPD Hamburg since 2021. From 2018 to 2021, he served as chairman of Jusos in Hamburg.
