= Alexander Stevens =

Alexander Stevens may refer to:

- Alexander H. Stephens (1812–1883), American politician
- Alexander Henry Stevens (1834–1916), American banker
- Alexander Hodgdon Stevens (1789–1869), American surgeon
- Alexander Stephens (born 1996), Welsh musician better known as Strawberry Guy
- Alexander Stevens, alias of J. Peters
