= Alexander ben Mordecai =

Alexander (Sender) ben Mordecai was associate rabbi of Prague in the second half of the 17th century. He is known for his work Sheḥiṭot u-Bediḳot, published in Amsterdam in 1667 in Hebrew and Judæo-German. The book deals with the religious laws and procedures for cattle slaughter and the inspection of the internal organs.
