= Alexander of Aegae =

1st-century Greek philosopher

Alexander of Aegae (Greek: Ἀλέξανδρος Αἰγαῖος) was a Peripatetic philosopher who flourished in Rome in the 1st century AD, and was a disciple of the celebrated mathematician Sosigenes of Alexandria. He was tutor to the emperor Nero. He wrote commentaries on the Categories and the De Caelo of Aristotle. He had a son named Caelinus or Caecilius. Attempts in the 19th century to ascribe some of the works of Alexander of Aphrodisias to Alexander of Aegae have been shown to be mistaken.
