= Christian Winter =

German politician (born 1987)

Member of the Landtag of Mecklenburg-Vorpommern
- Incumbent
- Assumed office 26 October 2021
- Preceded by: Dirk Friedriszik
- Constituency: Ludwigslust-Parchim III

Personal details
- Born: 25 May 1987 (age 38)
- Party: Social Democratic Party (since 2005)

Christian Winter (born 25 May 1987) is a German politician serving as a member of the Landtag of Mecklenburg-Vorpommern since 2021. From 2017 to 2018, he served as chairman of Jusos in Mecklenburg-Vorpommern.
