= Aleksandr Davidovich =

Aleksandr Davidovich may refer to:

- Alexander Davidovich (wrestler) (born 1967), Israeli Olympic wrestler
- Alyaksandr Davidovich (born 1981), Belarusian footballer
- Aleksandr Davidovich (skier), Russian Paralympic skier who participated in Cross-country skiing at the 2014 Winter Paralympics
