= Alexander Grotov =

German politician (born 1985)

Member of the Landtag of Hesse
- Incumbent
- Assumed office 28 August 2026
- Preceded by: Martin-Benedikt Schäfer

Personal details
- Born: 28 May 1985 (age 41)
- Party: Christian Democratic Union (since 2016)

Alexander Grotov (Russian: Александр Гротов; born 28 May 1985) is a Soviet-born German politician serving as a member of the Landtag of Hesse since 2026. He has served as deputy chairman of the Christian Democratic Union in Kassel since 2024.
