= Koldo =

Koldo is a Basque masculine given name. Notable people with this name include:

- Koldo Aguirre (1939–2019), Spanish football player
- Koldo Álvarez (born 1970), Andorran footballer and manager
- Koldo Fernández (born 1981), Spanish cyclist
- Koldo Gil (born 1978), Spanish cyclist
- Koldo Gorostiaga Atxalandabaso (born 1940), Spanish politician
- Koldo Izagirre (born 1953), Spanish writer
- Koldo Mitxelena (1915–1987), Basque linguist
- Koldo Obieta (born 1993), Spanish footballer
- Koldo Olabarri (born 1992), Spanish actor
- Koldo Serra (born 1975), Spanish director
- Koldo Zuazo (born 1956), Basque linguist
