= Alexander Steffen =

German politician (born 1993)

Member of the Landtag of North Rhine-Westphalia
- Incumbent
- Assumed office 16 July 2026
- Preceded by: Dirk Wedel

Personal details
- Born: 3 February 1993 (age 33)
- Party: Free Democratic Party (since 2015)

Alexander Steffen (born 3 February 1993) is a German politician serving as a member of the Landtag of North Rhine-Westphalia since 2026. From 2020 to 2025, he served as chairman of the Young Liberals in North Rhine-Westphalia.
