= Alexander of Athens =

Ancient Athenian comic poet

Alexander of Athens (Ancient Greek: Ἀλέξανδρος) was a comic poet, the son of Aristion, whose name occurs in an inscription given in Böckh, who refers it to the 145th Olympiad in 200 BC. There seems also to have been a poet of the same name who was a writer of the Middle Comedy, quoted by the Scholiast on Homer, and Aristophanes and Athenaeus.
