= Aleksandr Vlasov =

Aleksandr, Alexander or Alexandr Vlasov may refer to:

- Aleksandr Vlasov (architect) (1900-1962), Soviet architect
- Aleksandr Vlasov (figure skater) (born 1955), former Soviet pair skater and coach
- Aleksandr Vlasov (politician) (1932–2002), Soviet politician
- Aleksandr Vlasov (cyclist) (born 1996), Russian cyclist
- Aleksandr Vlasov (politician, born in 1902) (1902–1942), Soviet politician
