= Alexander Day =

Alexander or Alex Day may refer to:

- Alexander Day (con artist) (fl. 1722–1723), British sharper
- Alexander Day (artist) (1751–1841), British artist and art collector
- Alex Day (born 1989), British musician
