= Alexander Verkhovskiy =

Russian politician (born 1956)

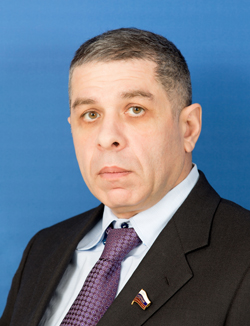

Federation Council of Russia
- In office 2010–2017

Personal details
- Born: Александр Григорьевич Верховский; August 23, 1956 (age 69) Leningrad, USSR
- Education: Military Engineering-Technical University (1978)
- Occupation: Businessman

Alexander Verkhovskiy (Russian: Александр Григорьевич Верховский) (b. August 23, 1956, in Leningrad, USSR) is a Russian entrepreneur, ranked No. 185 in the Forbes list of high-net-worth businessmen in Russia (2021). A former member of the Federation Council of Russia (2010—2017).

== Biography ==
Alexander Verkhov was born on August 23, 1956 in Leningrad, USSR. After receiving a Specialist degree in military construction from the Military Engineering-Technical University (1978), he served in the Red Army. Within 13 years, he worked in Moscow, Leningrad, and the Kuril Islands. In 1991, he resigned from the rank of lieutenant colonel.

== Entrepreneurship ==
In 1991, Verkhovskiy, along with two partners, founded Hydrostroy (Russian: Гидрострой), which worked both in fishing and fish processing. To construct fish processing plants on Itrup Island of Kuril Islands, he employed his former army subordinates to work as engineers and constructors. The company closely cooperated with the local authorities, which provided infrastructure and constructed roads to the Hydrostroy facilities.

Over 30 years, Hydrostroy expanded both its fishing and construction business. It has assembled its fishing fleet, constructed aquaculture facilities, built numerous processing plants, and established a bank. The company's construction projects in the Russian Far East included roads, bridges, hospitals, cultural centers, and geothermal plants. By 2010, Hydrostroy received a quarter of the government contracts to develop the Kuril Islands. It effectively became the backbone enterprise of the Kuril District of the Sakhalin Oblast.

== Politics ==
Verkhovskiy was elected to the parliament of the Kuril District three times: in 1997, 2001, and 2005. From 2010 to 2017, he was a Federation Council of Russia member, representing Sakhalin Oblast. He participated in the work of the committees responsible for the agriculture policy, the fishing industry, and the use of natural resources. In 2012, he was also the leading candidate on United Russia's list in the regional elections to the Sakhalin Duma.

== Awards ==
- II Degree Medal of the Order "For Merit to the Fatherland" (1998)
- The Russian Government Award in Science and Engineering (2007)

== Personal life ==
Alexander Verkhovskiy is married with two children. and its grandfother for Daniil Verkhovskiy
