= Alexander G. Bassuk =

American physician

- Education: University of Chicago
- Occupation: Pediatric neurologist

Alexander G. Bassuk is an American pediatric neurologist and professor of pediatrics, serving as the Chair of the Stead Family Department of Pediatrics and physician-in-chief at the University of Iowa Stead Family Children's Hospital. He is known for his research on neurological, retinal, and inflammatory diseases, particularly epilepsy and retinal disease.

== Education ==
Bassuk received his AB with Highest Honors in Fundamentals: Issues and Texts from the University of Chicago in 1991. He earned his PhD in Biological Sciences Pathology in 1996, which he completed under the supervision of Jeffrey Leiden. He received his medical degree from the University of Chicago's Pritzker School of Medicine in 1999 and completed his residency in pediatrics and pediatric neurology at Children's Memorial Hospital (now called Lurie Children's Hospital) at Northwestern University.

== Career and research ==
Bassuk began his academic career as an instructor and then assistant professor at Northwestern University, before joining the University of Iowa in 2007. Bassuk served as director of the Division of Pediatric Neurology from 2018 to 2021. In 2021, he was appointed Chair of the Stead Family Department of Pediatrics and Physician-in-Chief at the Stead Family Children's Hospital.

Bassuk's research is focused on uncovering the genetic mechanisms behind neurological diseases. His lab discovered a mutation in the PRICKLE1 gene in several families with epilepsy. They then demonstrated that altering PRICKLE expression in fruit flies, zebrafish, and mice could induce an epilepsy phenotype, advancing the understanding of the disorder and offering new avenues for treatment.

In collaboration with researchers at Stanford Medicine, Bassuk's team discovered mutations in the CAPN5 gene can cause autosomal dominant neovascular inflammatory vitreoretinopathy (ADNIV), a form of uveitis that leads to retinal degeneration. Future research aims to build on this knowledge to develop new treatments for retinal inflammatory and other human diseases.

Bassuk's research has been consistently funded by the National Institutes of Health (NIH) and he currently serves as the principal investigator on multiple NIH grants. He has authored over 130 scientific papers, with more than 8,500 citations. In 2020, Bassuk was interviewed by Good Morning America and the CBS Evening News after treating a 4-year-old patient who lost her vision after a rare complication from the flu.

In 2024, Bassuk testified before the U.S. Congress in support of the Accelerating Kids Access to Care Act (H.R. 4758), aimed at improving children's access to essential health care by reducing administrative barriers in Medicaid programs that make it harder for patients to seek care in other states.

He also serves as a recruiter for the National Institute of Health's Child Neurologist Career Development Program (CNCDP) and is on the selection committee for the Pediatric Scientist Development Program (PSDP).
