= Alexander Ziegler (German writer) =

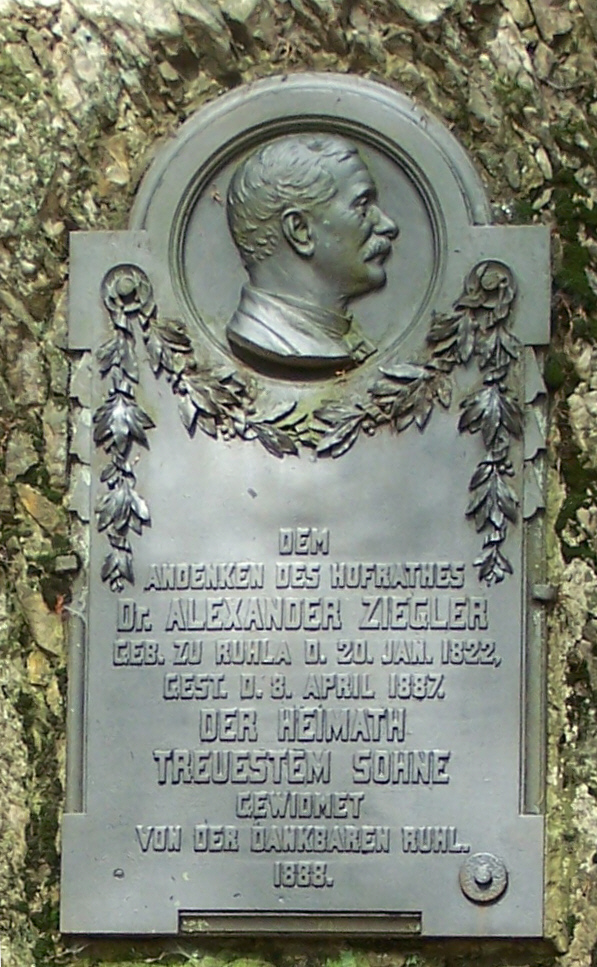
Memorial plaque in Ruhla

Alexander Ziegler (20 January 1822, Ruhla - 8 April 1887, Wiesbaden) was a German travel writer, economist and government councilor.

== Biography ==
He was born into the family of a factory owner. After completing his primary education in Eisenach, he studied political science at the University of Jena, but did not graduate. Then, attempting to follow his father's wishes and go into business, he went to Munich for lessons in brewing, but found it to be of little interest. During this time, he learned to speak English, French and Spanish. In 1857, he finally completed his doctorate in Jena.

His parents were wealthy, so he began traveling at an early age. He made his first overseas trip in 1846, visiting New York City, Boston and other places in North America. His experiences with German immigrants there inspired him to become interested in reforming the emigration process.

Further trips took him to Spain, Istanbul, Madeira, Anatolia, Jordan and Lesbos. After each of his travels, he would publish thoroughly researched accounts, often in several volumes, which included cultural, economic, historical and geographic information. His travels paused for only a brief time, during the Franco-Prussian War, when he devoted himself to caring for wounded soldiers.

Ruhla remained his base of operations and he became involved in numerous civic affairs, including a railway extension, improving the schools, building libraries, and creating a foundation to care for the elderly. His work earned him numerous awards and honors. In 1861, Charles Alexander, Grand Duke of Saxe-Weimar-Eisenach named him a Hofrat and, in 1867, he received the Knight's Cross of the Order of the White Falcon from William I, the King of Prussia.

He died while staying at the spa in Wiesbaden.

== Publications (selection) ==
- Skizzen einer Reise durch Nordamerika und Westindien mit besonderer Berücksichtigung des Staates Wisconsin. (two volumes, 1848)
- Meine Reise im Orient. (two volumes, 1855)
- Die Reise des Pytheas nach Thule. (1861)
- Der Rennsteig des Thüringerwaldes. Eine Bergwanderung mit einer historisch-topographischen Abhandlung über das Alter und die Bestimmung dieses Weges. Höckner, Dresden 1862 (Online)
- Die Auswanderung der Thüringer Messerschmiede nach Preußen. (1865)
- Regiomontanus, Joh. Müller aus Königsberg in Franken, ein geistiger Vorläufer des Columbus., reprinted 2018, Forgotten Books ISBN 978-0-666-27009-2
