= Higher Chemical College of the Russian Academy of Sciences =

Educational institution in Moscow, Russia

Higher Chemical College
- Motto: none
- Type: Public
- Established: 1990
- Chancellor: Prof. Oleg M. Nefedov
- Location: Moscow, Russia
- Colors: Royal Blue Grey Violet
- Website: http://it-mda.ru/HCC/index.php

Higher Chemical College of the Russian Academy of Sciences (HCC RAS) is an educational institution in Moscow, Russia. Coordinated by the Russian Academy of Sciences, formally being a department of Mendeleev University of Chemical Technology of Russia for technical reasons. The focus of HCC RAS is on training research scientists. At least one day of the week is free of classes and entirely dedicated to hands-on lab work in RAS institutes. After 5 to 5.5 years, College students defend a thesis and receive a diploma in Chemistry, equivalent to B.S./M.Sc. degree.

== Admission ==
Annual admission to the College is approximately 30 students.
