= Alexander (Aetolian general) =

3rd-century BC Greek general

- Conflicts: Social War

Alexander (Ancient Greek: Ἀλέξανδρος) of Aetolia, in conjunction with Dorimachus, put himself in possession of the town of Aegeira in Achaea during the Social War, in 220 BC. The conduct of Alexander and his associates disrespected the inhabitants and took so much of their resources, that the inhabitants of the town rose to expel the small band of the Aetolians. In the ensuing contest Alexander was killed while fighting.
