= Levels of Knowing and Existence =

Textbook by Harry L. Weinberg

- Author: Harry L. Weinberg
- Language: English
- Genre: Philosophy
- Publisher: Harper and Row
- Publication date: 1959
- Publication place: United States
- Media type: Print (hardback & paperback) (all versions out of print)
- Pages: 274
- ISBN: 978-0-910780-00-1 (paperback)
- OCLC: 2658865

Levels of Knowing and Existence: Studies in General Semantics (Harper and Row 1959) is a textbook written by Professor Harry L. Weinberg that provides a broad overview of general semantics in language accessible to the layman.

== Author ==
Harry L. Weinberg was born in Philadelphia, Pennsylvania, in 1913. He received his BS degree from the College of the City of New York in 1933 and his MS in chemistry from the University of Pennsylvania the following year. He worked for a period as a chemist and during the Second World War was engaged with the Merchant Marines. Weinberg's interest in general semantics was stirred by a seminar he attended in 1940 in Chicago presented by Alfred Korzybski and by Korzybski's seminal publication on the subject, Science and Sanity (1933), which Weinberg first read in 1940 and reread during his time with the Merchant Marines. His interest in the field prompted him in 1947 to enroll at Northwestern University for graduate work under Irving J. Lee. He received his master's degree from the university in 1948 and his PhD in 1953 in the field of speech.

In 1948 he began teaching at Temple University in Philadelphia as an instructor in Speech and General Semantics and continued to teach there as a professor until his death in 1968. A former student of his relates that "His classes in General Semantics on introductory and advanced levels were popular, and he became well known as an outstanding teacher." Although he wrote many papers on general semantics, his greatest academic contribution, in terms of depth and reach, is widely considered to be his book Levels of Knowing and Existence.

== Subject matter ==
Levels of Knowing and Existence is concerned with the principle of general semantics and toward that end provides "invariable contextual insights into understanding Alfred Korzybski's Science and Sanity, discussing epistemological, ethical, aesthetic, etc., problems." Given the subject matter, the book's approach, structure, and language are remarkably straightforward and relatively easy to grasp without prior study in the field. This aspect of the book is even more pronounced when compared to Korzybski's Science and Sanity, which is invariably considered a very difficult book to understand. Furthermore, unlike Science and Sanity, Weinberg uses almost no mathematical formulas in his text. Notwithstanding these differences, the two books cover the same basic material and arrive at the same basic conclusions with regard to the central nervous system's abstraction process in general and the uses and limitations of language in particular. Some of those conclusions are summarized as follows:

- Non-additivity: The whole is more than the sum of the parts. Under the Aristotelian concept of "additively", C contains only the characteristics present in "A or B"; whereas in reality "C" is a new structure with unique characteristics.
- Non-identity: The Aristotelian concept of identity (i.e. A = A) is postulated to be an illusion, for no two events are identical and no event can ever be perfectly repeated, because each event takes place at a given time. Non-identity, coupled with Werner Heisenberg's uncertainty principle upends strict determinism: not only is everything incredibly complex, "Everything happens just once and verification requires duplication."(p. 115)
- Consciousness of abstraction: Awareness of the abstracting process causes many perceived differences and problems to vanish. For example, color does not exist in and of itself but rather results from abstracting certain wavelengths upon our retina. Another somewhat related example offered in the book concerns the old quandary of whether a tree falling in the forest makes any sound if there is no one to hear. The answer lies in how "sound" is defined. If sound is the creation of sound waves, then yes a "sound" is made, for a recording device could detect them. If a sound, however, is defined as the reception of those waves upon an eardrum, then a “sound” is not made.
- Time-binding theory: A comparison is established between Korzybski's "Time-binding" and Abraham Maslow's theory of hierarchical needs.
- In stepping beyond the usual ambit of textbooks on the subject, Levels of Knowing and Existence also elucidates how general semantics can be used to analyze and better understand other disciplines that seek to explain human life on their own terms. Notably the book includes sections analyzing religion, cybernetics, decision-making, and psychotherapy, among others. Of particular interest to many readers are the final sections of Chapter 9, which connect Korzybski's extensionalizing (factual evaluating) of the non-verbal levels with Zen Buddhism's satori. The book attempts to demonstrate that both systems result in a spiritual enlightenment attained by insight into the dynamic, non-symbolic reality.

"The Preface"

== Chapters ==
Chapter headings include:

- Introduction
- Some Basic Concepts
- Some Limitations of Language
- The Abstracting Process
- Some Consequences of Process Thinking
- Consciousness of Abstracting
- The Value of Values
- Semantitherapy
- Religion
- Structure and Function in Cybernetics and General Semantics

== Reviews ==
The extant reviews of the text are primarily from proponents of general semantics and experts in the field and are invariably favorable. Those who object in general to the theories of general semantics usually focus their criticism on the founder Alfred Korzybski and his publications.

Robert P. Pula, the one-time Director Emeritus of the Institute of General Semantics, stated that he believed Levels of Knowing and Existence "may be the best 'middle level' text in general semantics." Pula has also remarked that Weinberg's book is to be commended for adhering to Korzybski's teachings while also "wedded to his [Weinberg's] sometimes startling ability to simply-clarify epistemological complexities that have been torturing over-verbalized Westerners for twenty-five hundred years."
