= Structural differential =

Chart or model use to illustrate the nervous system

The structural differential is a physical chart or three-dimensional model illustrating the abstracting processes of the human nervous system. In one form, it appears as a pegboard with tags. Created by Alfred Korzybski, and awarded a U.S. patent on May 26, 1925, it is used as a training device in general semantics. The device is intended to show that human "knowledge" of, or acquaintance with, anything is partial—not total.

== The model ==
Korzybski's "Structural Differential".

The structural differential consists of three basic objects. The parabola represents a domain beyond our direct observation, the sub-microscopic, dynamic world of molecules, atoms, electrons, protons, quarks, and so on; a world known to us only inferentially from science. Korzybski described it as an 'event' in the sense of "an instantaneous cross-section of a process." Thus the 'event' or parabola represents the sub-microscopic 'stuff' that, at any given moment, constitutes an apple. In other words, the parabola represents the "external" cause of what we experience.

The disc represents the non-verbal result of our nervous systems reacting to submicroscopic "stuff", e.g., the apple that we see, hold, bite into, all on the non-verbal levels of experience. The disc represents what we experience of our surroundings versus what our surroundings actually are.

The labels [usually seven or eight are linked together in a chain, with the last one attached back to the parabola, but here we see just one] are shaped like suitcase labels, and represent the static world of words, e.g., "apple", giving imperfect accounts of dynamic reality. An object called an "apple" left in a jar for months becomes a putrid liquid (because of its underlying, dynamic, sub-microscopic structure), but the label "apple" does not change. The word "steak", at a lower verbal order, may imply "something to eat" at a higher verbal order, but in the sub-microscopic domain, a particular steak may be contaminated with poisons created by harmful bacteria that we could see only on microscopic levels. Thus the differential sets up a hierarchy of order, with the submicroscopic domain of dynamic change coming first, the relatively stable universe conveyed non-verbally by our senses coming next, and then the verbal levels. A label is what we attach to a non-verbal experience in order to identify this experience in verbal terms; when we identify an "apple", we attribute to this identification various non-verbal experiences.

The holes in the figures represent the characteristics that exist at each level. The characteristics that are abstracted to the next level are indicated by the attached strings. The strings that don't make it to the next level represent characteristics left out of our abstractions, as do the holes without strings at all. More is left out of our abstractions at each level than was there at the previous level.

The structural differential was used by Korzybski to demonstrate that human beings abstract from their environments, that these abstractions leave out many characteristics, and that verbal abstractions build on themselves indefinitely, through many orders or levels, represented by seven or eight labels (or less, or more, it is totally arbitrary how many we want to symbolize the higher levels), chained in order. The highest, most reliable abstractions at a date are made by science, he claimed (e.g., science has conveyed the nature and danger of bacteria to us), and that is why he attached the last label back to the parabola. It is science that has told us that the sub-microscopic domain exists, and in general semantics the parabola represents that domain. In general semantics, the natural order of evaluation proceeds from lower orders of abstraction to higher orders of abstraction, and back again in an endless cycle. In these cycles, we return periodically or eventually to "silence on the objective levels" (our ground) before moving on to the higher orders, i.e., before bursting into speech or theory.

== General semantics ==
The general semantics discipline was founded by Korzybski, who gained recognition first with the publication of Manhood of Humanity (1921) and then Science and Sanity (1933). Some of his ideas were popularized by Stuart Chase in The Tyranny of Words in 1938, and by Samuel Ichiye Hayakawa, in Language in Action in 1941 (which later became Language in Thought and Action). Also influential was the magazine ETC: A Review of General Semantics, founded in 1943. The name of the magazine, ETC, was a play on a fundamental notion of Korzybski's that names or descriptions do not exhaustively convey all of an object's properties (the word "steak" does not convey the possibility of harmful bacteria, for instance).

== See also ==
- Semantic differential
