= Language in Thought and Action =

Book by S. I. Hayakawa

- First edition
- Author: S. I. Hayakawa
- Language: English
- Subject: General semantics
- Publisher: Harcourt
- Publication date: 1949
- Publication place: United States
- Media type: Print (Hardcover and Paperback)
- Pages: 196 pp (5th edition paperback)
- ISBN: 978-0-15-648240-0
- OCLC: 23137765
- Dewey Decimal: 420.143 20
- LC Class: PE1585 .H36 1990b

Language in Thought and Action is a 1949 book on general semantics by Samuel Ichiye Hayakawa, based on his previous work Language in Action (1939). Early editions were written in consultation with different people. The 5th edition was published in 1991. It was updated by Hayakawa's son, Alan R. Hayakawa and has an introduction by Robert MacNeil. The book has sold over one million copies and has been translated into eight languages.

Insight into human symbolic behavior and into human interaction through symbolic mechanisms comes from all sorts of disciplines: not only from linguistics, philosophy, psychology, and cultural anthropology, but from attitude research and public opinion study, from new techniques in psychotherapy, from physiology and neurology, from mathematical biology and cybernetics. How are all these separate insights to be brought together? ...I have examined the problem long enough to believe that it cannot be done without some set of broad and informing principles such as is to be found in the General Semantics of Alfred Korzybski.

— Hayakawa, S. I. (Samuel Ichiyé) (1949). Language in Thought and Action. University of Alberta Libraries. New York : Harcourt, Brace & World. p. 11.
