= Mira Edgerly-Korzybska =

American portrait painter

- Born: Mira Edgerly; January 18, 1872; Aurora, Illinois, US
- Died: July 13, 1954 (aged 82)
- Resting place: Lime Rock, Connecticut, US
- Occupation: portrait painter
- Spouse: Alfred Korzybski (m. 1919; died 1950)

Mira Edgerly-Korzybska (née Edgerly; January 18, 1872 – July 13, 1954), also known as Myra Edgerly and Countess de Korzybska, was an American painter. She specialized in miniature portraits on ivory, though her "miniatures" tended to be larger than average.

== Early life ==
Mira Edgerly was born on January 18, 1872 in Aurora, Illinois, to Rosa Haskell and Samuel Haven Edgerly. Her father was the director of the Michigan Central Railroad. The family moved to Jackson, Mississippi and then to Detroit, where Edgerly attended The Liggett School. Around 1892, Edgerly moved with her mother and sisters to San Francisco.

Following the death of her father, Edgerly needed to find work to help support her impoverished family. Inspired by a magazine article about American miniature portrait painter Amalia Küssner Coudert, Edgerly began teaching herself to paint miniatures on ivory.

== Mid-life and career ==
=== Pre-World War I ===
Edgerly moved to New York around 1900, continuing her self-taught portraiture practice in a studio on 35th Street. According to writer Burges Johnson, Edgerly quickly gained access to the upper-class New York social scene. She also traveled to London at the invitation of Mrs. Patrick Campbell, where she began painting commissioned portraits of "the pre-World War I 'privileged classes.'"

Edgerly became friends with portrait photographer Arnold Genthe and posed for him. The two had a "mutually inspiring friendship," and discussed portraiture, arrangements, and composition. Between 1905 and 1914 Edgerly also had a studio in Paris. There she was encouraged in her work by John Singer Sargent, who appreciated the unusually large size of Edgerly's ivory miniatures. She also became friends with Gertrude Stein, who wrote about her as "Myra Edgerly" in The Autobiography of Alice B. Toklas:

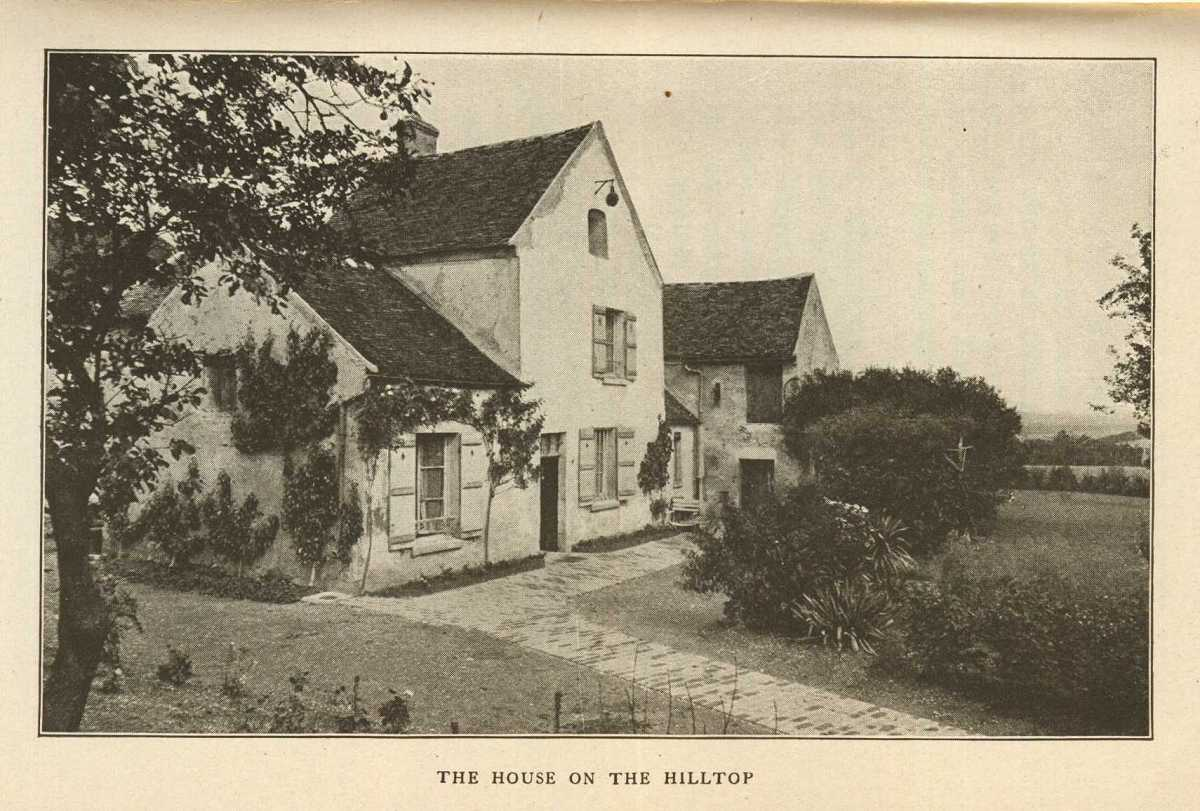
Mira Edgerly-Korzybska secured the funds for Mildred Aldrich to move into this house, where she wrote her best-seller, A Hilltop on the Marne (1915)

Mildred Aldrich once brought a very extraordinary person Myra Edgerly. I remembered very well that when I was quite young and went to a fancy-dress ball, a Mardi Gras ball in San Francisco, I saw a very tall and very beautiful and very brilliant woman there. This was Myra Edgerly young. Genthe, the well known photographer did endless photographs of her, mostly with a cat. She had come to London as a miniaturist and she had had one of those phenomenal successes that americans do have in Europe. She had miniatured everybody, and the royal family, and she had maintained her earnest gay careless outspoken San Francisco way through it all. She now came to Paris to study a little. She met Mildred Aldrich and became very devoted to her. Indeed it was Myra who in nineteen thirteen, when Mildred's earning capacity was rapidly dwindling secured an annuity for her and made it possible for Mildred to retire to the Hilltop on the Marne.

Myra Edgerly was very earnestly anxious that Gertrude Stein's work should be more widely known. When Mildred told her about all those unpublished manuscripts Myra said something must be done. And of course something was done.

She knew John Lane slightly and she said Gertrude Stein and I must go to London. But first Myra must write letters and then I must write letters to everybody for Gertrude Stein. She told me the formula I must employ. I remember it began, Miss Gertrude Stein as you may or may not know, is, and then you went on and said everything you had to say.

In late 1913 or early 1914, Edgerly traveled to Ottawa, where she painted the portrait of Princess Patricia of Connaught. On February 1, 1914 she married Frederick Burt. The marriage lasted only a few months.

=== World War I and after ===
In August 1914, Edgerly returned to the United States, where she continued painting portraits commissioned by wealthy society members. She had an exhibition at the women-only Colony Club in New York in 1915. According to a story from the United States Department of Labor, Edgerly also volunteered as a farmhand in Westville, Indiana during this time.

Edgerly also visited in Washington, D.C., where she met Count Alfred de Skarbek Korzybski, at the time a Polish soldier. On January 17, 1919, the two married, making Edgerly the Countess de Korzybska. In the years that followed, Edgerly-Korzybska continued to paint, while also helping Alfred develop the theories that would lead to his creation of general semantics. In his 1921 book, Manhood of Humanity, Alfred thanked her for "her steady and relentless work and her time, which saved my time." The Art Institute of Chicago holds a 1922 painting by Edgerly-Korzybska titled The Time-Binder, a reference to Alfred's theory of time-binding, which he would first present at the International Mathematical Congress in 1924. From 1927 to 1933, the Korzybskis lived in Brooklyn and prepared Alfred's Science and Sanity for publication.

Beginning in 1937, Edgerly-Korzybska spent two years in South America, traveling and painting. She then moved to Chicago, where the Institute of General Semantics was located.

== Later life and death ==
From 1943, Edgerly-Korzybska experienced arthritis which prevented her from painting. Around this same time, she began studying anthropology at the University of Chicago, and worked on writing an autobiography, which was never published. Mira Edgerly-Korzybska died on July 13, 1954. She was cremated and buried next to her husband in Lime Rock, Connecticut.

== Major collections ==
- Mother Love, 1911, Metropolitan Museum of Art, New York, New York
- The Dodge Children of Detroit, 1926, Metropolitan Museum of Art, New York, New York
- Portrait of Alice T. Miner, c. 1916, Alice T. Miner Museum, Chazy, New York
- The Time-Binder, 1922, Art Institute of Chicago, Chicago, Illinois
