= Monster Study =

1939 experiment in Davenport, Iowa, US

The Monster Study was a non-consensual experiment performed on 22 orphan children between ages 5 to 15 at the Soldiers and Sailors Orphans Home in Davenport, Iowa in 1939 about stuttering. It was conducted by Wendell Johnson through the University of Iowa with the physical experiment being performed by his graduate student Mary Tudor. Wendell Johnson, a former student at the University of Iowa, dedicated his life’s work to identifying the causes of stuttering and discovering a cure. Johnson, who had a severe stutter himself, wanted to understand where it originated and how it could be stopped, largely because he had been teased throughout his life. When he began studying speech pathology, he tested his own speech patterns, and his theory that speech disorder is learned behaviour and not biological. Johnson, who understood the impact that early stuttering could have on a child’s mental state, once stated, “The stuttering child is a crippled child.”

The study was never published, and as a result was relatively unknown until a 2001 San Jose Mercury News article conducted by an investigative reporter, Jim Dryer. He revealed the details and followed up with the former test subjects who were still living – none of whom were told it was an experiment. A lawsuit took place and the seven test subjects from the "positive punishment" group (i.e., they were given negative feedback; they had an added stimulus that was undesired) were awarded $925,000 by the State of Iowa for lifelong psychological and emotional scars.

The nickname "Monster Study" was coined in the 1940s and 1950s by those associated with the Stuttering Research Program at University of Iowa. Some assume it was due to Johnson's peers being horrified that he would experiment on orphan children to confirm a hypothesis, while others suggest it is due to what was said to the children themselves that was considered monstrous. Regardless of the distinction, Tudor's thesis is the only official record of the details of the experiment.

== Study ==
The study was performed through the University of Iowa, which is well-known for their advancements for stuttering research; other investigators at the university would investigate gun shot noises on stutterers. Johnson, a stutterer himself, is said to have created the thesis for this experience, and it was performed by his graduate student Mary Tudor. The experiment took place at the Iowa Soldiers' Orphans' Home in 1939. Johnson’s original hypothesis of the study was that a child stutter starts in an adult’s ear, not in the child’s mouth. Johnson got this idea based on his own experience as a child from his parents.

=== Setup ===
The intent was to induce stuttering in non-stuttering children by telling them that they stuttered, and to stop stuttering in stuttering children by ignoring the stutter and telling them that they spoke 'fine'.

The researchers had four questions in mind when carrying out the study:

1. will 'removing' the label 'stutterer' from those who have been so labeled have any effect on their speech fluency?;
2. will endorsement of the label 'stutterer' previously applied to an individual have any effect on their speech fluency?;
3. will endorsement of the label 'normal speaker' previously applied to an individual have any effect on their speech fluency?; and
4. will labeling a person previously regarded as a normal speaker, a 'stutterer' have any effect on their speech fluency?

256 children were screened by Tudor and five other graduate students who served as judges. They listened to a pool of individual children speak and graded them on a scale from 1 (poor) to 5 (fluent). Twenty-two subjects were selected from a range of ages between 5 and 15. The subjects, along with the workers of the orphanage, were not told the intent of Tudor's research, and they believed these were speech therapy sessions. There were ten orphans among the twenty-two whom teachers and matrons had marked as stutterers before the study began. The other twelve were deemed to be 'normal' speakers (i.e. did not have a stutter).

The ten selected stuttering children were then divided into two groups:

1. Group IA (experimental): Five stuttering children were selected and would be told that their speech was fine and that they did not stutter.
2. Group IB (control): Five stuttering children were selected and would be told that their speech is "as bad as people say," and receive traditional speech therapy.

The 12 selected non-stuttering children were chosen from the population of 'normal' speaking (considered fluent) orphans. Although these children had "speech errors" and disfluencies, they were not considered to be stutterers. They were also divided into two groups:

1. Group IIA (experimental): Six normal (i.e. fluent) children were selected and would be told that their speech was horrible, that they were beginning to stutter, that they must correct this immediately, and not to speak unless it was without a stutter.
2. Group IIB (control): Six normal (i.e. fluent) children were selected and would be told they did not stutter, and were given compliments on their enunciation.

The stuttering group were told their speech was poor which led them to internallise this label and found they began to act like stutterers. They whispered when spoken to, shuffled their feet and clamped their mouths shut and were less talkative.

=== Treatment ===
On the first visit, Tudor tested each child's I.Q. and identified whether they were left-handed or right-handed. A popular theory held at the time was that stuttering was caused by a cerebral imbalance. If, for example, a person was born left-handed but was using their right hand, their nerve impulses would misfire, affecting their speech. Johnson did not believe the theory, but still suggested Tudor test each child's handedness. Tudor had them draw on chalkboards and squeeze the bulb of a dynamometer. Most were right-handed, but left-handed children were present in all the groups. During this period, they assigned numbers to the children, such as "Case No 15 Experimental Group IIA..."

The experimental period lasted from January until late May 1939, and the actual intervention consisted of Tudor driving to Davenport from Iowa City every few weeks and talking with each child for about 45 minutes. She followed an agreed-upon script.

In her dissertation, she reported that she talked to the stuttering children who were going to be told that they did not stutter (IA) and said, in part, "You'll outgrow [the stuttering], and you will be able to speak even much better than you are speaking now... Pay no attention to what others say about your speaking ability for undoubtedly they do not realize that this is only a phase."

To the non-stuttering children in IIA, who were told they stutter, she said: "The staff has come to the conclusion that you have a great deal of trouble with your speech… You have many of the symptoms of a child who is beginning to stutter. You must try to stop yourself immediately. Use your will power… Do anything to keep from stuttering… Don't ever speak unless you can do it right. You see how [the name of a child in the institution who stuttered severely] stutters, don't you? Well, he undoubtedly started this very same way."

=== Clinical notes ===
The children in IIA responded immediately. After her second session with 5-year-old Norma Jean Pugh, Tudor wrote, "It was very difficult to get her to speak, although she spoke very freely the month before". Another in the group, 9-year-old Betty Romp, "practically refuses to talk", a researcher wrote in his final evaluation; "Held hand or arm over eyes most of the time". Hazel Potter, 15, the oldest in her group, became "much more conscious of herself, and she talked less", Tudor noted. Potter also began to interject and to snap her fingers in frustration. When Potter was asked why she said 'a' so much, she replied, "Because I'm afraid I can't say the next word". When asked, "Why did you snap your fingers?" she replied, "Because I was afraid I was going to say 'a'".

All the children in Group IIA's schoolwork fell off. One of the boys began refusing to recite in class. The other, eleven-year-old Clarence Fifer, started anxiously correcting himself. "He stopped and told me he was going to have trouble on words before he said them", Tudor reported. She asked him how he knew. He said that the sound "wouldn't come out. Feels like it's stuck in there".

The sixth orphan, Mary Korlaske, a 12-year-old, grew withdrawn and fractious. During their sessions, Tudor asked whether her best friend knew about her 'stuttering', Korlaske muttered, "No". "Why not?" Korlaske shuffled her feet. "I hardly ever talk to her". Two years later, she ran away from the orphanage and eventually ended up at the Industrial School for Girls. Tudor gave Korlaske negative speech therapy that made her increasingly aware of her speech. Tudor instructed her, “Take a breath before you say a word if you think you are going to stutter. Stop and start over if you stutter. Put your tongue on the roof of your mouth. Do not speak unless you can speak correctly. Watch your speech at all times. Do anything to keep from stuttering.” Korlaske was one of the children who responded very quickly to Tudor’s methods; within the first week of Tudor’s presence, she had already begun paying closer attention to how she spoke.

Most of the non-stuttering children who received negative therapy in the experiment suffered negative psychological effects, and some retained speech problems for the rest of their lives.

Tudor herself was impacted. Three times after her experiment had officially ended, she returned to the orphanage to voluntarily provide follow-up care. She wrote to Johnson about the orphan children in a letter dated April 22, 1940, "I believe that in time they … will recover, but we certainly made a definite impression on them". She attempted to reverse the negative effects caused by the experiment but lamented in her letters to Johnson she was unable to provide enough positive therapy to reverse the deleterious effects.

== Reaction ==
Johnson never published the results, and the study was relatively unheard of beyond those who knew Johnson. However, because the stuttering clinic at the University of Iowa attracted a lot of leading researchers, it was an open secret. Those at the center dubbed the experiment the "Monster Study" in the 1940s and 1950s. Johnson died early in 1965. A 1988 article published in the Journal of Fluency Disorders suggests that he never published it due to embarrassment over the experiment's conclusions.

In 2001, 62 years after the experiment was performed, Jim Dryer, an investigative reporter for the San Jose Mercury News, wrote a series of articles after finding the Monster Study tucked away in the basement at the University of Iowa. He was horrified and began reaching out to the test subjects to better understand what had happened and its impact. He compiled and released a series of articles, leading to the unpublished experiment receiving national news attention. By then, several of the orphaned children had died, but several were still alive and freely shared with Dryer. When Dryer asked about his own opinion of the study, he says how the study should never be considered defensible in any era and further stated “in no way would I ever think of defending this study. In no way. It’s more than unfortunate.”

The article revealed that some of the children had long-lasting psychological effects stemming from the experiment. One woman expressed horror to learn that she had been part of an experiment without her consent or knowledge. She had believed her whole life that she was a stutterer, and the negative feedback from Tudor had caused her to be withdrawn from many aspects of life. Children of one of the original subjects reported that their parent was very quiet and were self-conscious about their speech. Furthermore, one of the children at the orphanage explained that on the day Mary Tudor arrived, she believed Tudor would become her new mother, calling it one of the best days she had experienced there. May Korlaske, when interviewed by Dryer, did not know about the experiment nor understand its purpose, and neither did the other subjects involved. Korlaske, one of the children in the study, wrote a letter to Tudor decades later after learning about the experiment, stating, “You destroyed my life… I could have been a scientist, an archaeologist, or even president. Instead, I became a pitiful stutterer. The kids made fun of me, my grades fell, I felt stupid. Clear into my adulthood, I still want to avoid people to this day.”

Dryer also interviewed Mary Tudor, who was 84 years old, on the record about her experiences and its impact on her. Tudor, who had spent years trying to forget the experiment, continued to carry deep guilt. She explained that it had been an assignment and that the world was different then. She also stated that if she were given the same assignment today, she would not carry it out. When confronted with letters from the children at the orphanage, she often could not bring herself to open them and would begin to shake. If she did open them, she became visibly distraught and speechless. Tudor explained that she did not like what she was doing to the children, but at the time, one did what one was told, repeatedly emphasizing that it had been an assignment.

=== Response ===
The University of Iowa's "Wendell Johnson Speech and Hearing Clinic" is still one of the driving educational centers for stuttering research. After the release of articles by San Jose Mercury News, the University of Iowa publicly apologized for the Monster Study in 2001. A spokesman for the University of Iowa said that while the standards for experiments were different in 1939, this experiment was "regrettable under any circumstance".

A colleague of Johnson says ' Today, we might disagree with what he did, but in those days it was fully within the norms of the time'.

==== Jim Dryer and Mercury News ====
Jim Dryer resigned from his position at San Jose Mercury News after publishing the series of articles about the Monster Study. Executive Officer for the paper said Dryer, who is also a master's degree candidate at the University of Iowa, presented himself only as a graduate student to gain access to an Iowa archive, and said that the archive was not open to journalists. These comments stemmed from an archivist, Jim Hendrickson, stating that Dryer told him he was doing research for his dissertation and never mentioned he was a journalist. Dryer also signed a statement that he was a student of psychology, which he was not. Hendrickson further explained that reporters were not allowed into the archives. However, Hendrickson clarified a few weeks later that he was wrong, and it was not uncommon for reporters to view sensitive material in the archive. By then, though, media reports were done. San Jose Mercury News refused to correct their earlier assertion about the archives being open to journalists.

=== Public response ===
==== Speech pathologists ====
Speech pathologists have condemned the experiment and said that the orphans' speech and behavior were adversely affected by the negative conditioning they received. Furthermore, even though the study was not successful and had many ethical issues, speech pathologists learned that stuttering does have initial roots that can come from learning. This has become widely influential in understanding stuttering. Wendell Johnson is known as one of the first people to do research regarding speech and stuttering.

A book Ethics: A Case Study from Fluency was written and published in 2005 to provide an impartial scientific evaluation. The panel of authors in the book consists mostly of speech pathologists who fail to reach any consensus on either the ethical ramifications or scientific consequences of the Monster Study. Some argued that it was in poor taste to experiment on orphaned children regardless of legal requirements at the time, and others argue that it was not understood at the time to be dangerous.

==== Reanalysis of results ====
Some therapists felt the study was poorly designed and executed by Tudor, and as a result the data offered no proof of Johnson's subsequent hypothesis that "stuttering begins, not in the child's mouth but in the parent's ear"—i.e., that it is the well-meaning parent's effort to help the child avoid what the parent has labeled "stuttering" (but is in fact within the range of normal speech) that contributes to what ultimately becomes the problem diagnosed as stuttering.

In 1993, Paticia Zebrowski, University of Iowa assistant professor of speech pathology and audiology said that the data that resulted from the experiment is the "largest collection of scientific information" on the phenomenon of stuttering and that Johnson's work was the first to discuss the importance of the stutterer's thoughts, attitudes, beliefs, and feelings and continues to influence views on stuttering greatly.

Overall, the study failed to prove Johnson's theory. Moments of stuttering did not change in a notable way. However, the moments of speech hesitation, interruptions and non-stuttering disfluencies increased for Group IIA.

==== Criticism from stutterers ====
Although the study has developed fame, few commentators are people who stutter themselves. Wendell Johnson, who performed the study, had a stutter and is still highly acclaimed in stuttering research.

The podcast All In The Mind featured an appearance by guest Jonty Claypole, who labeled the study as “horrifying”. Claypole, who has a stutter and works as a writer and documentary producer, discovered the Monster Study while conducting research for his book “Words Fail Us.” Claypole argues that Johnson helped shape the modern understanding of speech disorders. In the podcast, it is also discussed that although the research is not used today, it subsequently contributed to rewriting fundamental principles regarding how psychologists work with abused children and what ethical boundaries they are willing to cross in the pursuit of knowledge. Claypole further discusses what Mary Tudor told the orphanage children, quoting her as saying, “You have a great deal of trouble with your speech. The type of interruption you have is very undesirable. In fact, you are beginning to stutter. You must try to stop immediately. Use your willpower; it is absolutely necessary that you do this. Do anything to keep from chattering. Do not ever speak unless you can do it right.” He explains that this could be one of the worst things to say to a child with low self‑esteem and criticizes Tudor for not recognizing the lasting impact her words could have. He describes her statements as “chilling.”

The podcast Stutterology has two episodes on The Monster Study. Horak, the host, as well as McGuire, one of the guests, stutters. They critique the study harshly, but work to comprehend what was going on with fellow stutterer Wendell Johnson. Horak points to Johnson's recent conversion to General Semantics as the likely trigger. As an adult who feared speaking, Johnson telling himself he didn't really stutter impacted him positively. Johnson may have assumed this would work for children, not being aware of the difference between "stuttering" and "struggling with a stutter".

Horak also points out that what was said to the orphan children is still practiced in speech therapy for stuttering today. The guests and Horak refer to The Lidcombe Program handbook, a popular preschooler stuttering treatment program, as doing exactly what Johnson and Tudor did. McGuire also shares the way her experience with speech therapy mirrored some of the feelings expressed by the non-stuttering orphans.

=== Defense of Johnson ===
Many were quick to defend Wendell Johnson, even in the official apology from the University of Iowa in 2001, which asked not to tarnish Johnson's positive legacy over the study. Most professional criticisms of the Monster Study are intentional in pointing out that Johnson and Tudor did not intend to cause harm, and write ups about him after 2001 include the study as a minor point.

Nicholas Johnson, the son of the late Wendell Johnson, has vehemently defended his father. He and other speech pathologists have argued that Wendell Johnson did not intend to harm the orphan children and that none of the orphans were diagnosed as "stutterers" at the end of the experiment. Johnson talks about how the study was accepted during its era and was largely unknown for decades then rediscovered and widely criticized for ethical violation. In Johson paper, “Retroactive ethical judgments and human subjects research: The 1939 Tudor study in context [Conference paper]. Symposium on Ethics and the Tudor Study” focuses on fairness and how the study should be evaluated in the context of standards used during the past 63 years . Johnson reports that no harm was done to the subjects in the sense of “instilling chronic stuttering” and there is no evidence of intent to harm. He compares the study to other studies that did intend harm to patients and the difference in evidence, studies like the Tuskegee syphilis study.

The University of Iowa's speech clinic building is still named "Wendell Johnson Speech and Hearing". Other studies conducted during this period viewed the involvement of orphans in research as normal and not physically harmful. Procedures such as lobotomies, for example, were considered effective psychological treatments for individuals with mental illness, even though today they are widely regarded as unethical. As one scholar notes, “The use of vulnerable institutionalized children for exploratory procedures, investigative treatments, and experimental preventives was common in the 1920s.” In Davenport’s study, discussed in the chapter Eugenics and the Devaluing of Children, it is explained that researchers believed it was worthwhile to work with vulnerable children in order to shed light on social and medical problems, and no authority responsible for the children objected to such practices. This context helps illustrate why the Monster Study was considered acceptable at the time and why judging it solely by modern ethical standards can be misleading.

== Lawsuit ==
The surviving children from the experiment and the families of the ones who had died filed a joint lawsuit against the State of Iowa. The state tried to have the lawsuit dismissed, but in September 2005, Iowa's Supreme Court justices agreed with a lower court in rejecting the state's claim of immunity and petition for dismissal.

Many of the orphans testified that they were harmed by the "Monster Study" but outside of Mary Tudor, who testified in a deposition on November 19, 2002, there were no eyewitnesses. The advanced age of the three surviving former orphans on the plaintiff's side helped expedite a settlement with the state.

For the plaintiffs, we hope and believe it will help provide closure relating to experiences from long ago and to memories going back almost 70 years. For all parties, it ends long-running, difficult and costly litigation that only would have run up more expenses and delayed resolution to plaintiffs who are in their seventies and eighties.

On August 17, 2007, seven of the orphan children were awarded a total of $925,000 by the State of Iowa for lifelong psychological and emotional scars caused by six months of torment during the University of Iowa experiment. The study learned that although none of the children became stutterers, some became self-conscious and reluctant to speak.

== Ethics in studies ==
The American Speech-Language-Hearing Association now prohibits experimentation on children when there exists a significant chance of causing lasting harmful consequences.

The harm done to children and the psychological impacts of many experiments have led to greater concern, especially since most early studies were conducted on adults rather than children. Congress has approved incentives to spur research on the health of children. Meaning that researchers who study children may receive additional years of protection for their drugs and medical services. This way children can still be studied without recreating past problems. Today, strong justification is required before exposing children to any research risks, and most studies involving children are limited to only a minor increase over a minimal risk. In the case of Wendell Johnson there was little to no benefit beyond gaining personal vendetta and understanding where stuttering may come from, despite the significant risk involved.

In the National Research Act of 1974, informed consent became a requirement in experiments. The National Research Act of 1974 was created in response to a series of unethical human‑subject experiments, leading to the establishment of federal regulations and ethical oversight for research involving people. The Act created the National Commission for the Protection of Human Subjects of Biomedical and Behavioral Research, which was tasked with identifying basic ethical principles and developing guidelines to ensure that human research is conducted responsibly. The principles addressed by the Act include defining the boundaries between medical research and medical practice, evaluating risks and benefits, establishing appropriate research guidelines, and ensuring informed consent. This legislation ultimately led to the development of the Belmont Report, which identified children as a vulnerable population requiring additional safeguards and careful consideration of risk factors.

At the time of the study there was no strict regualtions on researching humans. Since the study was done on ophaned children there was no way to get parental consent that was required at the time. The research was also not confidential and they released 9 of the participants IQ, name, age and personal information. The princiable of automny states that individuals should have the right to make voluntary decisions and should have the right to know about the research being conducted.
