= How to Talk Back to Your Television Set =

1970 book by Nicholas Johnson

- Author: Nicholas Johnson
- Subject: Social commentary
- Publisher: Little
- Publication date: 1970
- Pages: 228

How to Talk Back to Your Television Set is a 1970 book by Nicholas Johnson that analyzes American television broadcasting and suggests changes.

== Bibliography ==
- Berger, Arthur A. (1970). "Review of How to Talk Back to Your Television Set". ETC: A Review of General Semantics. 27 (4): 493–495. ISSN 0014-164X. JSTOR 42576565.
- Kitman, Marvin (June 21, 1970). "How to Talk Back to Your Television Set". The New York Times Book Review. p. 6. ISSN 0362-4331.
- Mendelsohn, Harold (1970). "Review of How to Talk Back to Your Television Set; Living-Room War". AV Communication Review. 18 (4): 470–473. ISSN 0001-2890. JSTOR 30217619.
- "Review of How to Talk Back to Your Television Set". Best Sellers. 29: 463–. March 15, 1970.
- "Review of How to Talk Back to Your Television Set". Book World: 6–. March 29, 1970.
- "Review of How to Talk Back to Your Television Set". Christian Science Monitor: 9–. July 8, 1970.
- "Review of How to Talk Back to Your Television Set". Commentary. 49: 88–. June 1970.
- "Review of How to Talk Back to Your Television Set". The New Republic. Vol. 162. March 14, 1970. pp. 21–.
- "Review of How to Talk Back to Your Television Set". Saturday Review. 53: 116–. March 14, 1970.
