= Nicholas Johnson =

American Federal Communications Commission commissioner

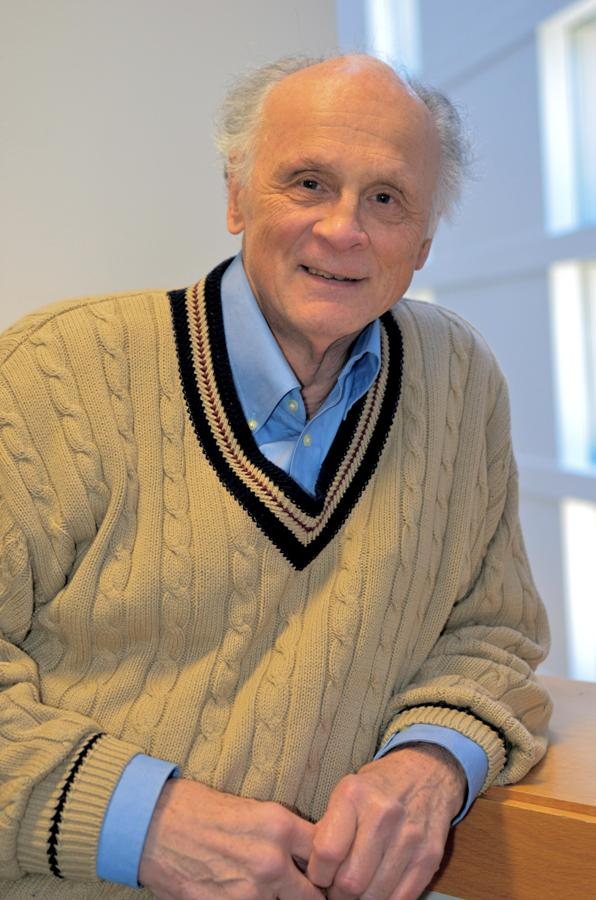

Commissioner of the Federal Communications Commission
- In office July 1, 1966 – December 5, 1973
- President: Lyndon B. Johnson; Richard Nixon

Personal details
- Born: September 23, 1934 (age 92) Iowa City, Iowa, U.S.
- Education: University of Texas at Austin
- Occupation: Lawyer

Nicholas Johnson (born September 23, 1934) is an American academic and lawyer. Johnson served on the Federal Communications Commission as a commissioner from 1966 to 1973. He wrote the 1970 book How to Talk Back to Your Television Set. He is retired from teaching at the University of Iowa College of Law, with an emphasis on communications and Internet law, and since 2006 has posted over 1000 blog essays.

== Life ==
Johnson was born in Iowa City in 1934 and raised in Iowa, to which he returned in 1980. His father was the noted psychologist and speech scientist, Wendell Johnson, lead researcher of the controversial Monster Study. He received his undergraduate and law degrees from the University of Texas at Austin, served as law clerk to U.S. Court of Appeals, 5th Circuit, Judge John R. Brown and U.S. Supreme Court Justice Hugo L. Black. He began his law teaching career at the University of California, Berkeley, practiced with Covington & Burling, Washington, and held three presidential appointments, including Administrator, U.S. Maritime Administration, and F.C.C. commissioner. Following the F.C.C. service he chaired the National Citizens Committee for Broadcasting in Washington, and ran for Congress from Iowa's Third Congressional District.

In 1972 Canadian filmmaker Red Burns, who'd served on the National Film Board of Canada (NFB)'s Challenge for Change and George C. Stoney, who'd likewise served a guest role, worked with Johnson to make the FCC Public-access television cable TV requirements. In the book "How to Talk Back to Your Television Set," Johnson discusses prototype community media. He appeared on the cover of Rolling Stone #79, April 1, 1971.

He hosted the PBS program, "New Tech Times," wrote a nationally syndicated newspaper column, "Communications Watch," and lectured through the Leigh Lecture Bureau during the early 1980s. He became involved in online education in the mid-1980s, when he chaired the Virtual Classroom Project, taught for the Western Behavioral Sciences Institute and Connected Education. He has served as co-director of the University of Iowa's public health organization, the Institute for Health, Behavior and Environmental Policy, as commissioner with the Iowa City Broadband and Telecommunications Commission, and school board member of the Iowa City Community School District.

He has traveled and lectured in many countries, and served on numerous boards and advisory boards, such as Common Cause (national board), World Academy of Art and Science (executive board), Volunteers in Technical Assistance (board), and Project Censored (editorial judge).

== Selected works ==
- How to Talk Back to Your Television Set (1970)
- Test Pattern for Living (1972)
- Your Second Priority: A Former FCC Commissioner Speaks Out (2008)
- Are We There Yet: Reflections on Politics in America (2008)
- What Do You Mean and How Do You Know? An Antidote for the Language That Does Our Thinking for Us (2009)
- Virtualosity: Eight Students in Search of Cyberlaw (2009)
- Predicting Our Future Cyberlife (2012)
- From D.C. to Iowa: 2012 (2012)

== See also ==
- Public access television
- International Leadership Forum
- List of law clerks for the first seat of the Supreme Court of the United States

== Sources ==
For general sources and verification see, e.g.: Who's Who in America (past and current editions); University of Iowa College of Law Faculty listing; "Articles About Nicholas Johnson" (including New York Times archives (search on "Nicholas Johnson," especially, e.g., "From: 01-01-1963 To: 12-31-1980"). See also "Nicholas Johnson Bibliography (1952–1996)"; "Nicholas Johnson Recent Publications (1996–2013)"; "Nicholas Johnson Federal Communications Commission Opinions".
