= Wendell Johnson =

American Author and Professor of Speech Pathology and Psychology

- Born: April 16, 1906; Roxbury, Kansas, US
- Died: August 29, 1965 (aged 59); Iowa City, Iowa, US
- Known for: Research into stuttering
- Title: Louis W. Hill Research Professor
- Board member of: American Speech and Hearing Association
- Children: Nicholas Johnson

Academic background
- Education: University of Iowa, B.A., M.A., Ph.D.
- Thesis: The Influence of Stuttering on the Personality (1931)
- Doctoral advisor: Lee Edward Travis

Academic work
- Discipline: Psychology
- Sub-discipline: Speech–language pathology
- School or tradition: General semantics
- Institutions: University of Iowa
- Website: Wendell Johnson memorial home page, archived October 13, 2007

Wendell Johnson (April 16, 1906 – August 29, 1965) was an American psychologist, author and was a proponent of general semantics (or GS). His life work contributed greatly to speech–language pathology, particularly in understanding the area of stuttering, as Johnson himself stuttered. The Wendell Johnson Speech and Hearing Center at University of Iowa is named after him. Aside from his contributions to stuttering, he posthumously became known for his controversial experiment nicknamed the "Monster Study".

== Early life ==
Wendell Andrew Leroy Johnson was born April 16, 1906 in Roxbury, Kansas as the youngest child to Swedish immigrants Andrew and Mary Johnson. His family lived on a farm.

Johnson began to stutter when he was around the age of five or six. He requested to be sent to schools to fix his stutter and was willing to try anything to cure it, but it proved to be lifelong.

Johnson was president of his high school class, captain of the football, baseball, and basketball teams, and valedictorian. He spent 2 years at a local college before moving to Iowa City, Iowa, to attend the University of Iowa. He chose this school due to their renowned Speech Clinic in hopes to have his stutter cured.

== Professional contributions ==
=== Stuttering ===
Considered one of the earliest and most influential speech pathologists in the field, Johnson spent most of his life trying to find the cause and cure for stuttering – through teaching, research, scholarly and other writing, lecturing, supervision of graduate students, and persuading K-12 schools, the Veterans Administration and other institutions of the need for speech pathologists. He played a major role in the creation of the American Speech and Hearing Association.

He was the first and most influential to introduce General Semantics into Speech Pathology, particularly stuttering and believed that "Stuttering often begins, not in the child's mouth, but in the parent's ear." He posited that when children who experience disfluent moments are told that they stutter - typically by well-meaning parents or therapists - it contributes and is a driving factor for why stuttering continues.

Patricia Zebrowski, University of Iowa assistant professor of speech pathology and audiology, notes, "The body of data that resulted from Johnson's work on children who stutter and their parents is still the largest collection of scientific information on the subject of stuttering onset. Although new work has determined that children who stutter are doing something different in their speech production than non-stutterers, Johnson was the first to talk about the importance of a stutterer's thoughts, attitudes, beliefs, and feelings. We still don't know what causes stuttering, but the 'Iowa' way of approaching study and treatment is still heavily influenced by Johnson, but with an added emphasis on speech production."

=== Publications ===
In 1930 Johnson published the book Because I Stutter, based on his master's thesis, which describes his struggles with stuttering from an autobiographical perspective.

The stutterer, if I may speak for him as a type, does not want pity any more than he wants contempt, but he does want the understanding which the normal respect of one human being for another makes possible. He is a human being, trying to make a stutterer's adaptation to a world of glib speakers.

Johnson's book People in Quandaries: The Semantics of Personal Adjustment (1946; still in print from the Institute of General Semantics) is an introduction to general semantics applied to psychotherapy. In 1956 his Your Most Enchanted Listener was published; in 1972, his Living With Change: The Semantics of Coping, a collection of selected portions of transcriptions of hundreds of his talks, organized by Dorothy Moeller, provided further general semantic insights. He also published many articles in his lifetime, in journals, including ETC: A Review of General Semantics. [1] Neil Postman acknowledges the influence of People in Quandaries in his own general semantics book Crazy Talk, Stupid Talk (1976, Delacorte, New York)

=== Monster Study ===
Wendell Johnson developed a study with the hopes of gathering a better understanding into the depths of stuttering. During the fall of 1938, Wendell Johnson recruited Mary Tudor, one of his clinical psychology graduate students. His goal was to see if telling a non-stuttering child that they stuttered would cause stuttering, and if telling a stuttering child they did not stutter would cure them.

One of the issues that arose from this study was the use of children without the use of informed consent.

The children who were told they were stutters developed real stuttering, anxiety, and refused to speak.

Mary Korlaske, a 5 year old girl, developed a life long stuttering and ran away from the orphanage.

A boy named Clarence Fifer became mute.

The experiment was hidden for 60 years. It was called the Monster Study by Johnson himself because he realized how cruel it was but did it anyways.

In 2001, the orphans sued the state of Iowa and won $925,000 but Johnson had already died as a pioneer.

== Personal life ==
At age 20, Wendell Johnson began his studies at the University of Iowa in 1926. He won honors in English and Journalism before switching to Psychology. He went on to earn his PhD in Clinical Psychology and Speech Pathology in 1931.

Johnson met his wife, Edna Amanda Bockwoldt, at the University of Iowa and they married May 31, 1929 in Galva, Iowa. They had 2 children.

In 1936, Johnson had to be rushed to the hospital for an appendicitis at age 30. It was at this time he read the book Science and Sanity and learned about general semantics for the first time.

His son, Nicholas Johnson, served on the Federal Communications Commission from 1966 to 1973.

In 1965, the year of Wendell Johnson's death, he was in the process of writing the Encyclopædia Britannica entry on “Speech Disorders”, defending both his work and his study when he had a heart attack. Although not fully completed, his 4,000 word essay was still published. He died at 59.
