= Robert Finch (politician) =

American politician (1925–1995)

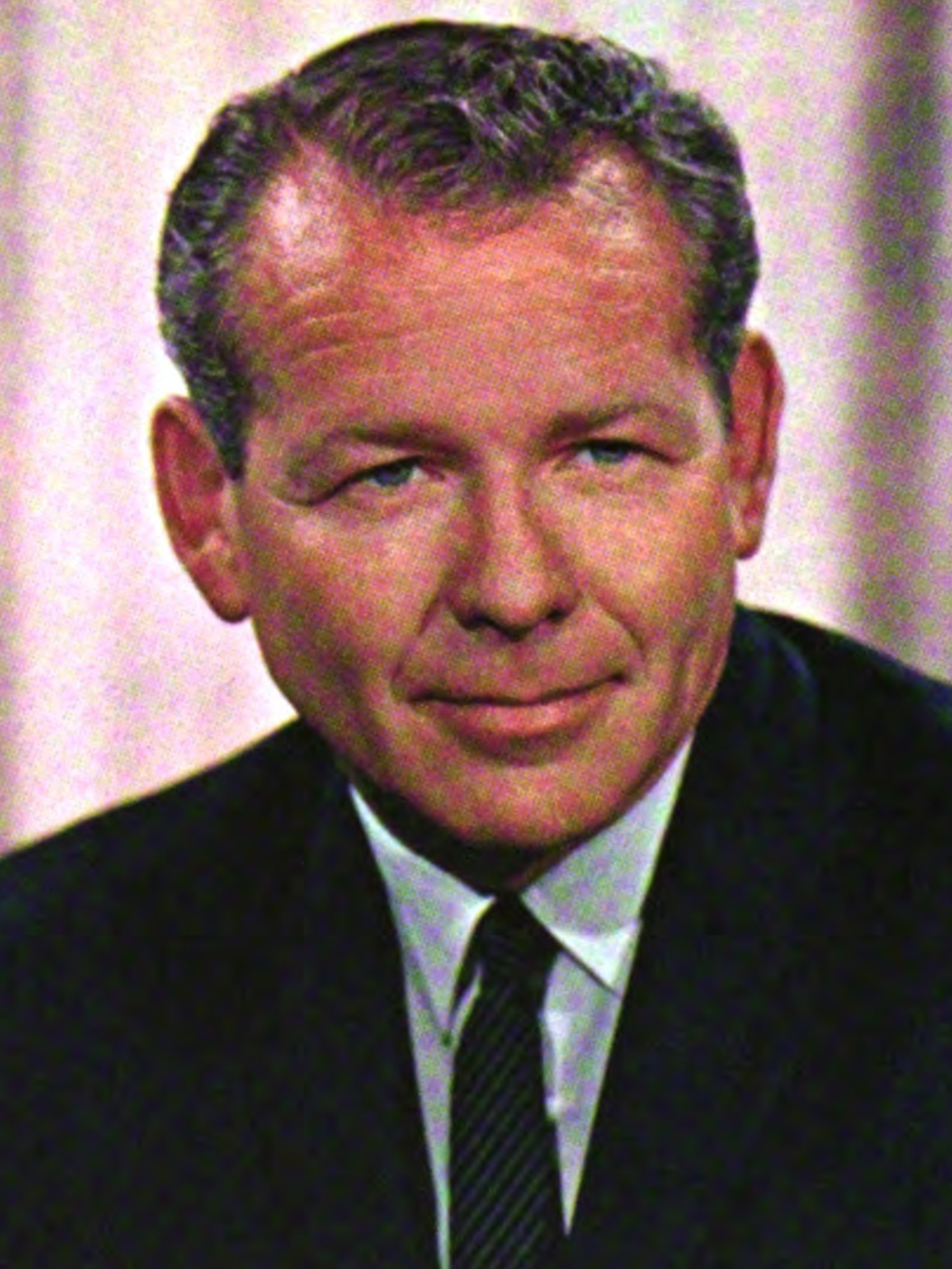
- Official portrait, 1967

Counselor to the President
- In office June 23, 1970 – December 15, 1972
- President: Richard Nixon
- Preceded by: Bryce Harlow; Pat Moynihan
- Succeeded by: Anne Armstrong

8th United States Secretary of Health, Education, and Welfare
- In office January 21, 1969 – June 23, 1970
- President: Richard Nixon
- Preceded by: Wilbur J. Cohen
- Succeeded by: Elliot Richardson

38th Lieutenant Governor of California
- In office January 2, 1967 – January 21, 1969
- Governor: Ronald Reagan
- Preceded by: Glenn M. Anderson
- Succeeded by: Edwin Reinecke

Personal details
- Born: Robert Hutchinson Finch; October 9, 1925 Tempe, Arizona, U.S.
- Died: October 10, 1995 (aged 70) Pasadena, California, U.S.
- Resting place: Forest Lawn Memorial Park
- Party: Republican
- Spouse: Carol Crothers (m. 1946)
- Children: 4
- Education: Occidental College (BA); University of Southern California (LLB)

Military service
- Allegiance: United States
- Branch/service: United States Marine Corps
- Years of service: 1951–1953
- Battles/wars: Korean War

Robert Hutchinson Finch (October 9, 1925 – October 10, 1995) was a Republican politician from La Canada Flintridge, California. From 1967 to 1969, he served as the 38th lieutenant governor of California. Following Richard Nixon's presidential campaign in 1968, he was appointed Secretary of Health, Education, and Welfare in 1969. He was the Counselor to the President from 1970 until 1972. During the 1976 California United States Senate election, he lost in the Republican primary to S.I. Hayakawa.

== Early life and education ==
Finch was born in Tempe, Arizona. He was the son of Robert L. Finch, a member of the Arizona House of Representatives, and his wife, Gladys Hutchinson. Finch was enlisted in the Marine Corps during World War II. He married the former Carol Crothers on February 14, 1946; they had three daughters and one son: Maureen F. Shaw, Kevin Finch, Priscilla Finch and Cathleen F. Morser.

After serving in the Marines briefly during World War II, Finch entered Occidental College in Los Angeles, where he graduated in 1947 with a bachelor's degree. After the graduation from Occidental College in 1947, went to Washington, D.C., where he worked as an administrative aide Congressman Norris Poulson, representative from California. During this time, he met and became friendly with freshman Congressman and future president Richard Nixon. Partly at Nixon's suggestion, Mr. Finch returned to California to study law at the University of Southern California, where he took his LL.B. degree in 1951.

== Career ==
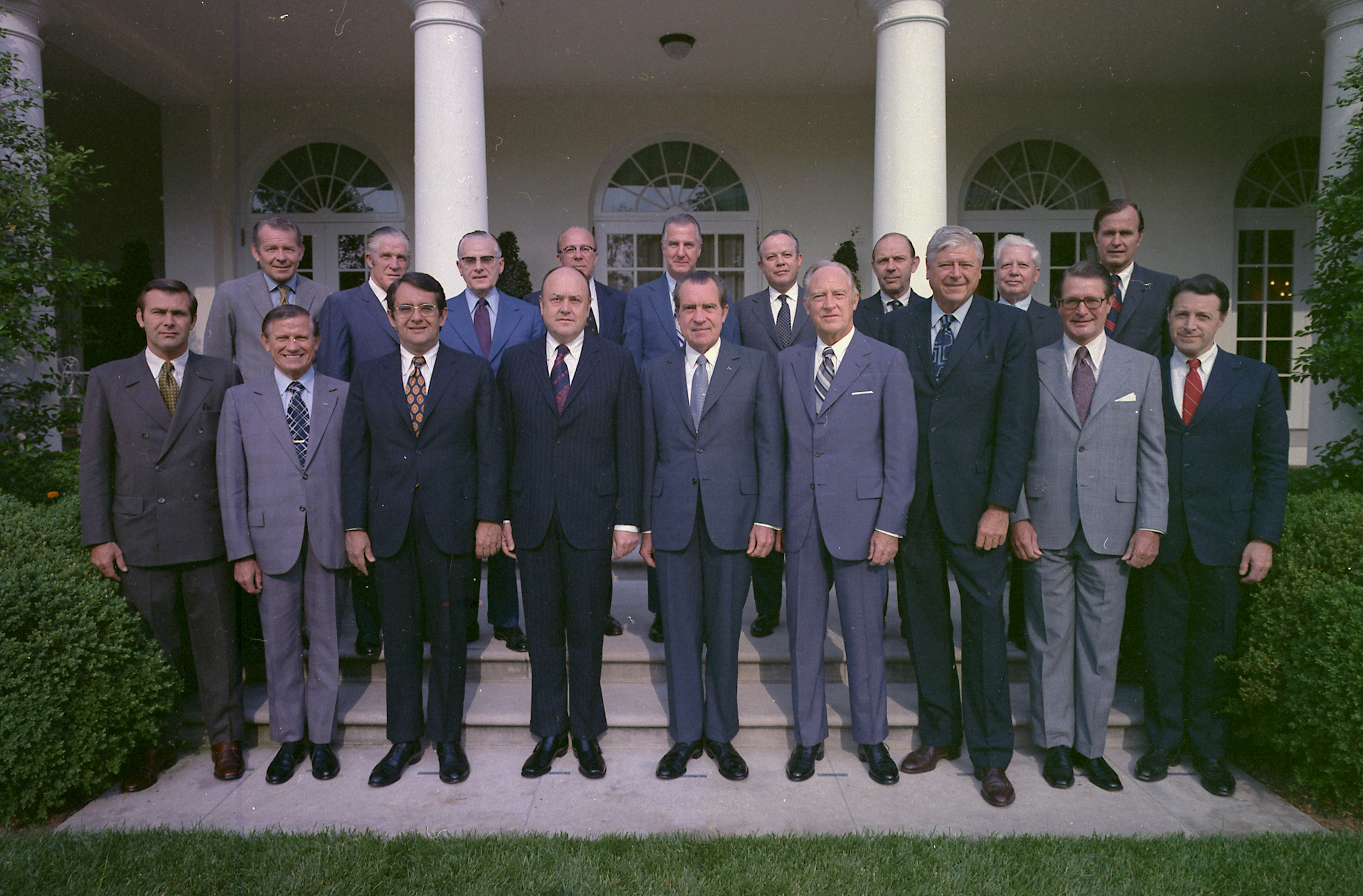
Finch in a group photo of Nixon's cabinet on June 16, 1972, far left in the back row.

He had worked on the Norris Poulson election campaign in 1946, and on Nixon's campaign in 1948. He returned to Southern California and earned his LL.B at the University of Southern California Law School in 1951.

He was a Marine officer during the Korean War from 1951 to 1953. He ran for the Congress unsuccessfully in 1952 and in 1954 against Democrat Cecil R. King, who practiced law in Pasadena, and was the chairman of the Los Angeles County Republican Central Committee, from 1956 to 1958. He returned to Washington as Vice-president Nixon's aide in 1958.

He was Nixon's campaign manager in the 1960 presidential campaign, against Massachusetts Senator John F. Kennedy.

In 1964, Finch managed U.S. Sen. George Murphy's victorious campaign over Pierre Salinger. In 1966, Finch was elected the 38th lieutenant governor of California. He received more votes than Ronald Reagan, who was elected governor of California at the same time. In 1968, Finch was the senior adviser in Nixon's presidential campaign and was appointed Secretary of Health, Education, and Welfare. In 1970, Finch left the HEW to be Counselor to the President. He left the White House on December 15, 1972, to practice law in Pasadena, and he stayed involved in the Republican politics. Even though Finch had no involvement in the Watergate scandal, references to it dimmed his efforts for elective office.

He was an unsuccessful primary candidate for U.S. Senate in the 1976 California election against S.I. Hayakawa, who went on to win the general election. During the 1968 presidential election, Finch was Nixon's first choice as his vice presidential running mate, but Finch declined and Nixon then chose Governor of Maryland Spiro Agnew. A Nixon-Finch ticket was possible because, although Nixon was born in California, and had represented California in Congress, during the 1968 election he was a resident of New York, so California's electors could have cast their votes for both men. If both had been California residents at the time, California's electors could have voted for only one of them.

Following Nixon's election, Finch was given his choice in the new Cabinet, and he selected Secretary of HEW because of his long interest in health and education issues. Finch was more liberal than Nixon, especially on social issues, but political differences never affected their long and close relationship, with the two staying in contact until Nixon's death in April 1994.

== Death ==
Finch died of a heart attack, in Pasadena, California, on October 10, 1995, a day after his 70th birthday. He is interred in Forest Lawn Memorial Park, Glendale.

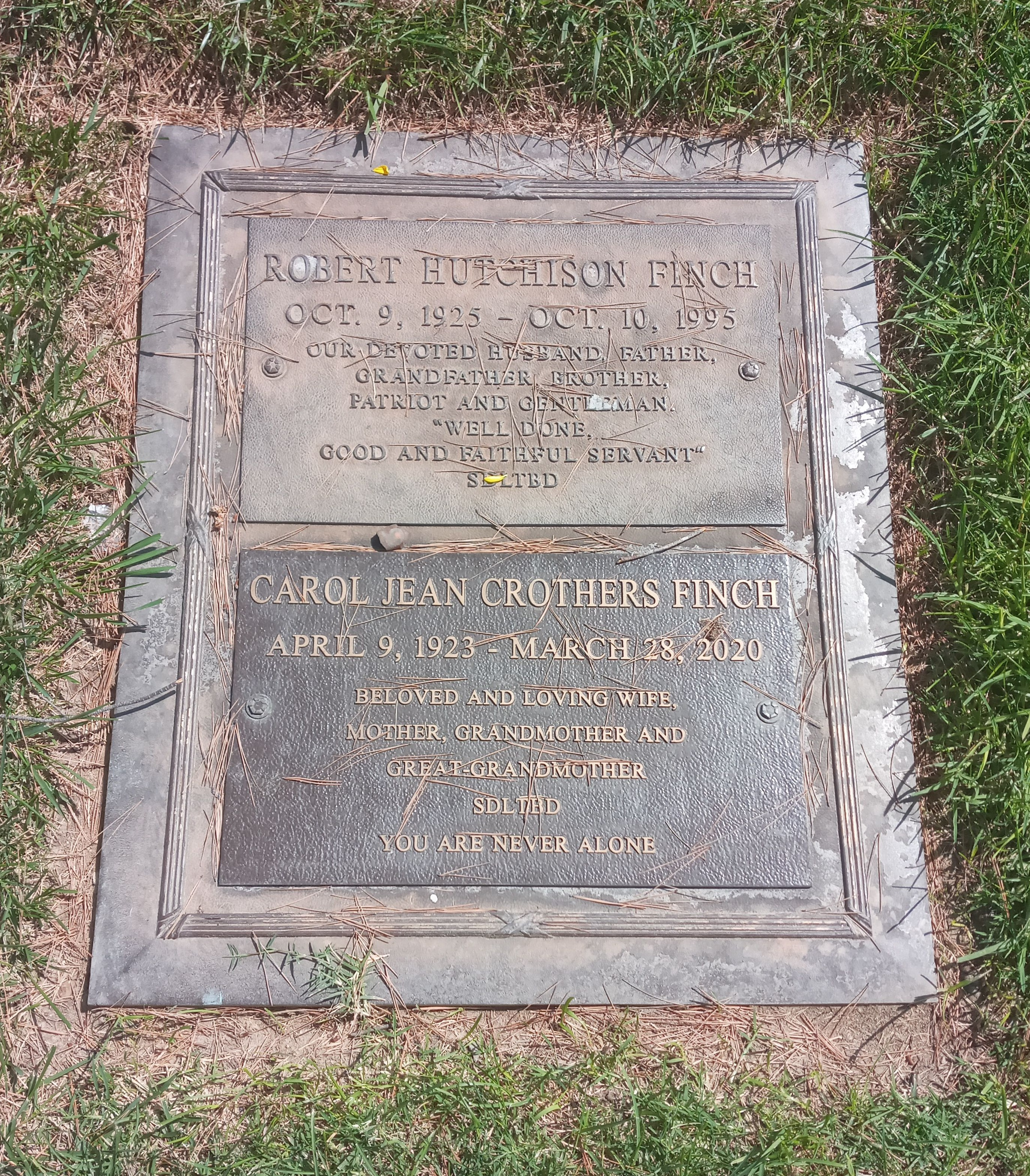
The gravesite of Robert Finch

Political offices
Preceded by Glenn M. Anderson	Lieutenant Governor of California; 1967–1969	Succeeded by Edwin Reinecke
Preceded by Wilbur J. Cohen	United States Secretary of Health, Education, and Welfare; 1969–1970	Succeeded by Elliot Richardson
Preceded by Bryce Harlow	Counselor to the President; 1970–1972; Served alongside: Donald Rumsfeld	Succeeded by Anne Armstrong
Preceded by Pat Moynihan	Counselor to the President; 1970–1972; Served alongside: Donald Rumsfeld	Succeeded by Anne Armstrong
