= 1976 United States Senate election in California =

- November 2, 1976
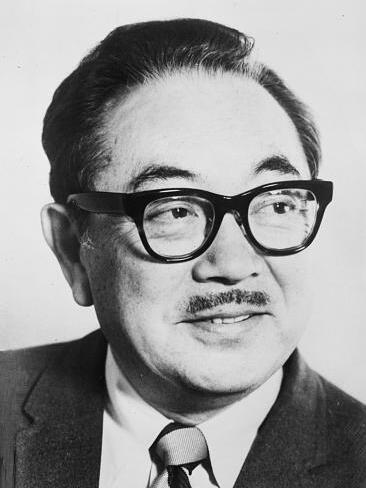

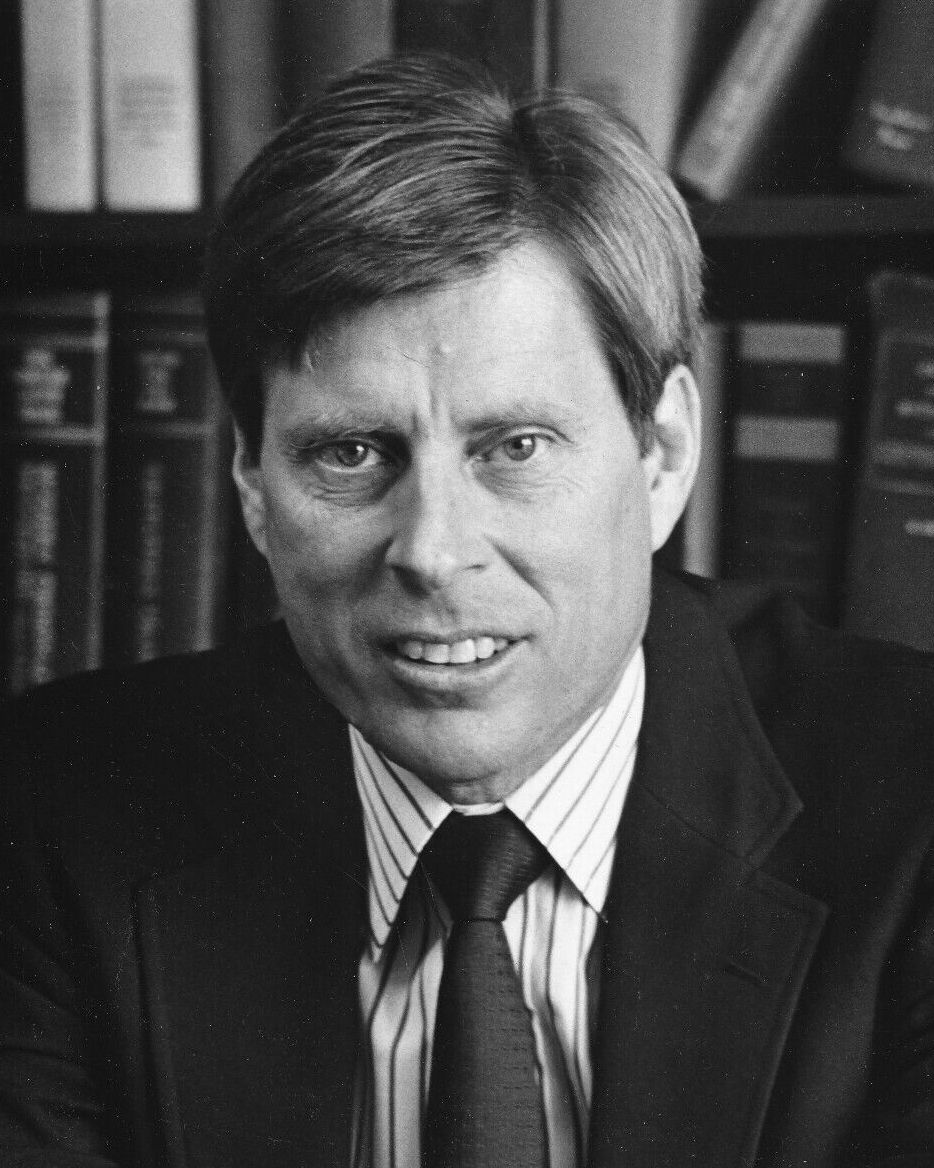
Nominee	S. I. Hayakawa	John V. Tunney
Party	Republican	Democratic
Popular vote	3,748,973	3,502,862
Percentage	50.18%	46.89%
- County results Hayakawa: 40–50% 50–60% 60–70% Tunney: 40–50% 50–60%
U.S. senator before election
John V. Tunney
Democratic
Elected U.S. Senator
S. I. Hayakawa
Republican

The 1976 United States Senate election in California took place on November 2, 1976. Incumbent Democratic U.S. Senator John V. Tunney ran for re-election to a second term, but was defeated by Republican S. I. Hayakawa. As of 2024, this is the last time an incumbent Democratic Senator from California lost re-election.

Primary elections were held on June 8. Tunney survived a challenge from anti-war activist Tom Hayden, the husband of Jane Fonda. Hayakawa, a novice campaigner, won a surprise victory over seasoned political figures Robert H. Finch, Alphonzo Bell Jr., and John L. Harmer.

== Democratic primary ==
=== Candidates ===
- Lois T. Bodle
- Leslie W. "Les" Craven, nominee for U.S. Representative in California's 25th congressional district in 1970 and 1972
- Howard L. Gifford, candidate for U.S. Senate in 1974
- Tom Hayden, anti-war activist and husband of Jane Fonda
- Millard F. Slover
- Frank L. Thomas
- John V. Tunney, incumbent U.S. Senator
- Bob Wallach
- Ronald L. Williams

=== Results ===
Results by county: Tunney: 40–50%; 50–60%; 60–70%; Hayden: 40–50%; 50–60%

1976 Democratic U.S. Senate primary
Party	Candidate	Votes	%
Democratic	John V. Tunney (incumbent)	1,774,879	53.79%
Democratic	Tom Hayden	1,210,637	36.69%
Democratic	Bob Wallach	73,142	2.22%
Democratic	Lois T. Bodle	54,220	1.64%
Democratic	Frank L. Thomas	53,843	1.63%
Democratic	Howard L. Gifford	46,977	1.42%
Democratic	Ronald L. Williams	29,511	0.89%
Democratic	Leslie W. Craven	28,583	0.87%
Democratic	Millard F. Slover	28,108	0.85%
Write-in	All others	25	0.00%
Total votes		3,299,925	100.00%

== Republican primary ==
=== Candidates ===
- Alphonzo E. Bell Jr., U.S. Representative from Santa Monica
- Hannibal C. Burchette V, doctor and friend of Gerald Ford
- Robert H. Finch, former Lieutenant Governor of California, United States Secretary of Health, Education, and Welfare, and advisor to President Richard Nixon
- John L. Harmer, State Senator
- S. I. Hayakawa, professor of semantics and president emeritus of San Francisco State University
- Henry Hill, Catholic activist
- Michael A. Hirt, lawyer
- Walter Hollywood
- Clyde F. Tracy, commercial artist
- James A. Ware, perennial candidate

=== Results ===
Results by county: Hayakawa: 20–30%; 30–40%; 40–50%; 50–60%; Finch: 20–30%; 30–40%; 40–50%

1976 Republican U.S. Senate primary
Party	Candidate	Votes	%
Republican	S. I. Hayakawa	886,743	38.25%
Republican	Robert H. Finch	614,240	26.49%
Republican	Alphonzo E. Bell Jr.	532,969	22.99%
Republican	John L. Harmer	197,252	8.51%
Republican	Walter Hollywood	28,163	1.22%
Republican	Clyde F. Tracy	17,784	0.77%
Republican	James A. Ware	14,990	0.65%
Republican	Henry Hill	10,290	0.44%
Republican	Michael A. Hirt	9,941	0.43%
Republican	Hannibal C. Burchette V	6,222	0.27%
Total votes		2,318,594	100.00%

== General election ==
=== Results ===
General election results
Party	Candidate	Votes	%
Republican	S. I. Hayakawa	3,748,973	50.18%
Democratic	John V. Tunney (incumbent)	3,502,862	46.89%
Peace and Freedom	David Wald	104,383	1.40%
American Independent	Jack McCoy	82,739	1.11%
Independent	Omari Musa	31,629	0.42%
Majority		246,111	3.23%
Turnout		7,470,586	100.00%
Republican gain from Democratic			

== See also ==
- 1976 United States Senate elections
