= Edward G. Conture =

American speech-language pathologist

Edward Gage Conture Ph.D., CCC-SLP (retired), BCS-SCF (retired) is an American speech-language pathologist. He is professor emeritus in the Department of Hearing and Speech Sciences at Vanderbilt University and Director for Grant and Research Development at the Arthur M. Blank Center for Stuttering Education and Research at the University of Texas at Austin. His research focuses on childhood stuttering and fluency disorders. He was editor of the Journal of Fluency Disorders and served on the advisory council of the National Institute on Deafness and Other Communication Disorders. He has published over 100 peer-reviewed works and co-authored several textbooks.

== Education ==
Conture earned a Bachelor of Science degree from Emerson College in 1967 and a Master of Arts degree from Northwestern University in 1968. He completed his Doctor of Philosophy (PhD) studies at the University of Iowa in audiology and speech-language pathology in 1972.

== Career ==
Conture served on the faculty at Syracuse University from 1972 to 1997, advancing through academic ranks to full professor. In 1997, he joined Vanderbilt University, where he was full professor in the Department of Hearing and Speech Sciences until attaining emeritus status in 2013. Combining Syracuse and Vanderbilt Universities, Conture was the doctoral advisor and doctoral dissertation director of 24 PhD graduates.

His research has examined developmental stuttering in children, including factors related to emotion, language, and motor control. He has authored or co-authored over 100 scholarly works, including journal articles, books, and book chapters. His research has received support from organizations such as the National Institute on Deafness and Other Communication Disorders (NIDCD) and the U.S. Office of Special Education Programs (OSEP).

Conture served as editor of the Journal of Fluency Disorders from 2004 to 2007 and was a member of the NIDCD Advisory Council from 2004 to 2008.

As of 2021, Conture is affiliated with the Arthur M. Blank Center for Stuttering Education and Research at the University of Texas as the Senior Director of Grant and Research Development.

== Selected publications ==
Conture's publications include empirical research and textbook contributions. Notable works include:

- Conture, Edward G. (2001). Stuttering: its nature, diagnosis, and treatment. Internet Archive. Boston, MA : Allyn and Bacon. ISBN 978-0-205-31924-4.
- Jones, Robin M.; Walden, Tedra A.; Conture, Edward G.; Erdemir, Aysu; Lambert, Warren E.; Porges, Stephen W. (18 August 2017). "Executive Functions Impact the Relation Between Respiratory Sinus Arrhythmia and Frequency of Stuttering in Young Children Who Do and Do Not Stutter". Journal of Speech, Language, and Hearing Research. 60 (8): 2133–2150. doi:10.1044/2017_JSLHR-S-16-0113. PMC 5829798. PMID 28763803.
- Zengin-Bolatkale, Hatun; Conture, Edward G.; Walden, Tedra A.; Jones, Robin M. (17 February 2018). "Sympathetic arousal as a marker of chronicity in childhood stuttering". Developmental Neuropsychology. 43 (2): 135–151. doi:10.1080/87565641.2018.1432621. PMC 5826607. PMID 29412003.
- Ntourou, Katerina; DeFranco, Elizabeth Oyler; Conture, Edward G.; Walden, Tedra A.; Mushtaq, Nasir (March 2020). "A parent-report scale of behavioral inhibition: Validation and application to preschool-age children who do and do not stutter". Journal of Fluency Disorders. 63 105748. doi:10.1016/j.jfludis.2020.105748. PMC 7061916. PMID 32065916.
- Zebrowski, Patricia M; Anderson, Julie D; Conture, Edward G. (2022). Stuttering and related disorders of fluency (Fourth ed.). New York: Thieme. ISBN 978-1-68420-253-9.
- Conture, E. G.; Zebrowski, P. M. (27 August 2024). Speaking of Academics: A memoir of mentoring PhD students. ISBN 979-8-3358-1354-9.
- Byrd, Courtney T.; Coalson, Geoffrey A.; Conture, Edward G. (10 December 2024). "CARE Model of Treatment for stuttering: Theory, assumptions, and preliminary findings". Frontiers in Psychology. 15 1488328. doi:10.3389/fpsyg.2024.1488328. PMC 11667897. PMID 39720681.
- Byrd, Courtney T.; Coalson, Geoffrey A. A.; Conture, Edward G. Gage (2026-06-05). "CARE Model Assessment for school-age children who stutter: An overview and preliminary findings". Frontiers in Psychology. 17 1736190. doi:10.3389/fpsyg.2026.1736190. PMC 13281213. PMID 42325357.

== Recognition ==
Conture has received several honors from professional organizations in the field of speech-language pathology:

- Malcolm Fraser Award, Stuttering Foundation of America (2003).
- Frank R. Kleffner Clinical Career Award, American Speech-Language-Hearing Foundation (2005).
- Honors of the Association, American Speech-Language-Hearing Association (2007).
- Lifetime Achievement Award, World Stuttering & Cluttering Organization (WSCO) (2024).
