= Journal of Fluency Disorders =

- Discipline: Speech-language pathology
- Language: English

Publication details
- History: 1974–present
- Publisher: Elsevier
- Frequency: Quarterly
- Open access: Hybrid
- Impact factor: 1.4 (2024)

Standard abbreviations
- ISO 4: J. Fluen. Disord.
- NLM: J Fluency Disord

Indexing
- ISSN: 0094-730X (print); 1873-801X (web)

Links
- Journal homepage; Online archive

The Journal of Fluency Disorders is a quarterly peer-reviewed medical journal covering research on fluency disorders in speech, including stuttering and cluttering. It covers clinical, experimental, and theoretical studies related to the assessment, treatment, and understanding of these disorders. The journal is published by Elsevier and serves as the official journal of the World Stuttering and Cluttering Organization. According to the Journal Citation Reports, the journal has a 2024 impact factor of 1.4.

== Overview and history ==
The journal was established in 1974 and focuses on research related to speech‑fluency disorders, particularly stuttering and cluttering. It publishes original research articles, review articles, short communications, and theoretical or methodological pieces. The journal is an official journal of the World Stuttering & Cluttering Organization.

Notable past editors of the journal include Edward G. Conture, Richard F. Curlee, Gene J. Brutten, and Hans-Georg Bosshardt.

The editors-in-chief are Katrin Neumann (University of Münster) and Julie D. Anderson (Indiana University Bloomington).
