= Alfred Korzybski =

Polish-American scholar and philosopher (1879–1950)

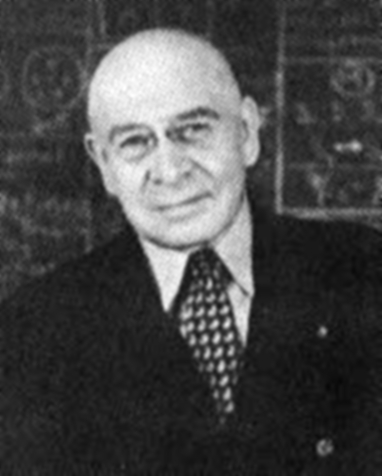
- Born: Alfred Habdank Skarbek Korzybski; July 3, 1879; Warsaw, Vistula Country, Russian Empire
- Died: March 1, 1950 (aged 70); Lakeville, Connecticut, U.S.
- Known for: Science and Sanity (1933)
- Spouse: Mira Edgerly (m. 1919)

Education
- Education: Warsaw University of Technology

Philosophical work
- Era: Modern philosophy: 20th-century philosophy
- Region: Western philosophy: American philosophy; Polish philosophy
- Institutions: Institute of General Semantics
- Main interests: Engineering; Logic; Mathematics; Philosophy; Semantics
- Notable ideas: General semantics Map–territory relation

Alfred Habdank Skarbek Korzybski (/kɔːrˈzɪbski, kəˈʒɪpski/ kor-ZIB-skee, kə-ZHIP-skee; Polish: [ˈalfrɛt kɔˈʐɨpskʲi]; July 3, 1879 – March 1, 1950) was a Polish-American philosopher and independent scholar who developed a field called general semantics, which he viewed as both distinct from, and more encompassing than, the field of semantics.

He is most notable for proposing that human knowledge of the world is limited both by the human nervous system and the languages humans have developed, and thus no one can have direct access to reality, given that the most we can know is that which is filtered through the brain's responses to reality. His best known dictum is "The map is not the territory". Many of his ideas and theories were presented in his book Science and Sanity (1933), which became the foundational text of general semantics.

== Early life and career ==
Alfred Korzybski's family coat-of-arms (see Abdank coat of arms).

Born in Warsaw, Vistula Country, which was then part of the Russian Empire, Korzybski belonged to an aristocratic Polish family whose members had worked as mathematicians, scientists, and engineers for generations. He learned the Polish language at home and the Russian language in schools, and having a French and German governess, he became fluent in four languages as a child.

Korzybski studied engineering at the Warsaw University of Technology. During the First World War (1914–1918) Korzybski served as an intelligence officer in the Russian Army. After being wounded in a leg and suffering other injuries, he moved to North America in 1916 (first to Canada, then to the United States) to coordinate the shipment of artillery to Russia. He also lectured to Polish-American audiences about the conflict, promoting the sale of war bonds. After the war, he decided to remain in the United States, becoming a naturalized citizen in 1940. He met Mira Edgerly, a painter of portraits on ivory, shortly after the 1918 Armistice; They married in January 1919; the marriage lasted until his death.

E. P. Dutton published Korzybski's first book, Manhood of Humanity, in 1921. In this work he proposed and explained in detail a new theory of humankind: mankind as a "time-binding" class of life (humans perform time binding by the transmission of knowledge and abstractions through time which become accreted in cultures). In 1924, he was invited to the International Congress of Mathematicians in Toronto where he delivered a talk entitled Time-Binding: The General Theory. In 1925 and 1926, Korzybski observed psychiatric patients at St. Elizabeth's hospital in D.C. under the supervision of William Alanson White.

== General semantics ==
Korzybski's work culminated in the initiation of a discipline that he named general semantics (GS). This should not be confused with semantics. The basic principles of general semantics, which include time-binding, are described in the book Science and Sanity, published in 1933. In 1938, Korzybski founded the Institute of General Semantics in Chicago. The post-World War II housing shortage in Chicago cost him the institute's building lease, so in 1946 he moved the institute to Lakeville, Connecticut, U.S., where he directed it until his death in 1950.

Korzybski maintained that humans are limited in what they know by (1) the structure of their nervous systems, and (2) the structure of their languages. Humans cannot experience the world directly, but only through their "abstractions" (nonverbal impressions or "gleanings" derived from the nervous system, and verbal indicators expressed and derived from language). These sometimes mislead us about what is the truth. Our understanding sometimes lacks similarity of structure with what is actually happening.

He sought to train our awareness of abstracting, using techniques he had derived from his study of mathematics and science. He called this awareness, this goal of his system, "consciousness of abstracting". His system included the promotion of attitudes such as "I don't know; let's see," in order that we may better discover or reflect on its realities as revealed by modern science. Another technique involved becoming inwardly and outwardly quiet, an experience he termed "silence on the objective levels".

== "To be" ==
Many devotees and critics of Korzybski reduced his rather complex system to a simple matter of what he said about the verb form "is" of the general verb "to be." His system, however, is based primarily on such terminology as the different "orders of abstraction," and formulations such as "consciousness of abstracting." The contention that Korzybski opposed the use of the verb "to be" would be a profound exaggeration.

He thought that certain uses of the verb "to be", called the "is of identity" and the "is of predication", were faulty in structure, e.g., a statement such as "Elizabeth is a fool" (said of a person named "Elizabeth" who has done something that we regard as foolish). In Korzybski's system, one's assessment of Elizabeth belongs to a higher order of abstraction than Elizabeth herself. Korzybski's remedy was to deny identity; in this example, to be aware continually that "Elizabeth" is not what we call her. We find Elizabeth not in the verbal domain, the world of words, but the nonverbal domain (the two, he said, amount to different orders of abstraction). This was expressed by Korzybski's most famous premise, "the map is not the territory". Note that this premise uses the phrase "is not", a form of "to be"; this and many other examples show that he did not intend to abandon "to be" as such. In fact, he said explicitly that there were no structural problems with the verb "to be" when used as an auxiliary verb or when used to state existence or location. It was even acceptable at times to use the faulty forms of the verb "to be," as long as one was aware of their structural limitations.

== Anecdotes ==
One day, Korzybski was giving a lecture to a group of students, and he interrupted the lesson suddenly in order to retrieve a packet of biscuits, wrapped in white paper, from his briefcase. He muttered that he just had to eat something, and he asked the students on the seats in the front row if they would also like a biscuit. A few students took a biscuit. "Nice biscuit, don't you think", said Korzybski, while he took a second one. The students were chewing vigorously. Then he tore the white paper from the biscuits, in order to reveal the original packaging. On it was a big picture of a dog's head and the words "Dog Cookies". The students looked at the package, and were shocked. Two of them wanted to vomit, put their hands in front of their mouths, and ran out of the lecture hall to the toilet. "You see", Korzybski remarked, "I have just demonstrated that people don't just eat food, but also words, and that the taste of the former is often outdone by the taste of the latter".

William Burroughs went to a Korzybski workshop in the autumn of 1939. He was 25 years old, and paid $40. His fellow students—there were 38 in all—included young Samuel I. Hayakawa (later to become a Republican member of the U.S. Senate) and Wendell Johnson (founder of the Monster Study).

== Influence ==
Korzybski's work had a positive reception from a variety of persons in the 1940s and 1950s. Robert A. Heinlein named a character after him in his 1940 short story "Blowups Happen". The science fiction writer A. E. van Vogt based his novel The World of Null-A, published in 1948, on ideas from General Semantics. On March 8, 1949, fellow science-fiction author L. Ron Hubbard wrote to Heinlein referencing Korzybski as an influence on what would become Dianetics:

Well, you didn't specify in your book what actual reformation took place in the society to make supermen. Got to thinking about it other day. The system is Excalibur. It makes nul A's.

Korzybski's ideas influenced philosopher Alan Watts and physicist Fritjof Capra who used his phrase "the map is not the territory" in lectures and writings "The Tao of Physics", 35th Anniversary Edition. Writer Robert Anton Wilson was also deeply influenced by Korzybski's ideas.

Avant-Garde Situationist artist and author Ralph Rumney used Korzybski's phrase "the map is not the territory" as a title for his autobiography, which was published in 2001.

The third edition of Science and Sanity states that in World War II the United States Army used Korzybski's system to treat battle fatigue in Europe, under the supervision of Dr. Douglas M. Kelley, who went on to become the psychiatrist in charge of the Nazi war criminals at Nuremberg.

Some of the General Semantics tradition was continued by Samuel I. Hayakawa.

== Publications ==
- Manhood of Humanity: The Science and Art of Human Engineering. New York: E.P. Dutton. 1921.
- Science and Sanity: An Introduction to Non-Aristotelian Systems and General Semantics. Lancaster, Pennsylvania: Science Press Printing Co. 1933.

== See also ==
- Alfred Korzybski Memorial Lecture – American non-profit corporation
- Concept and object – Philosophical distinction by Gottlob Frege
- E-Prime – Restricted form of the English language
- Institute of General Semantics – American non-profit corporation
- Structural differential – Chart or model use to illustrate the nervous system
