= S. I. Hayakawa =

Canadian-American academic and politician (1906–1992)

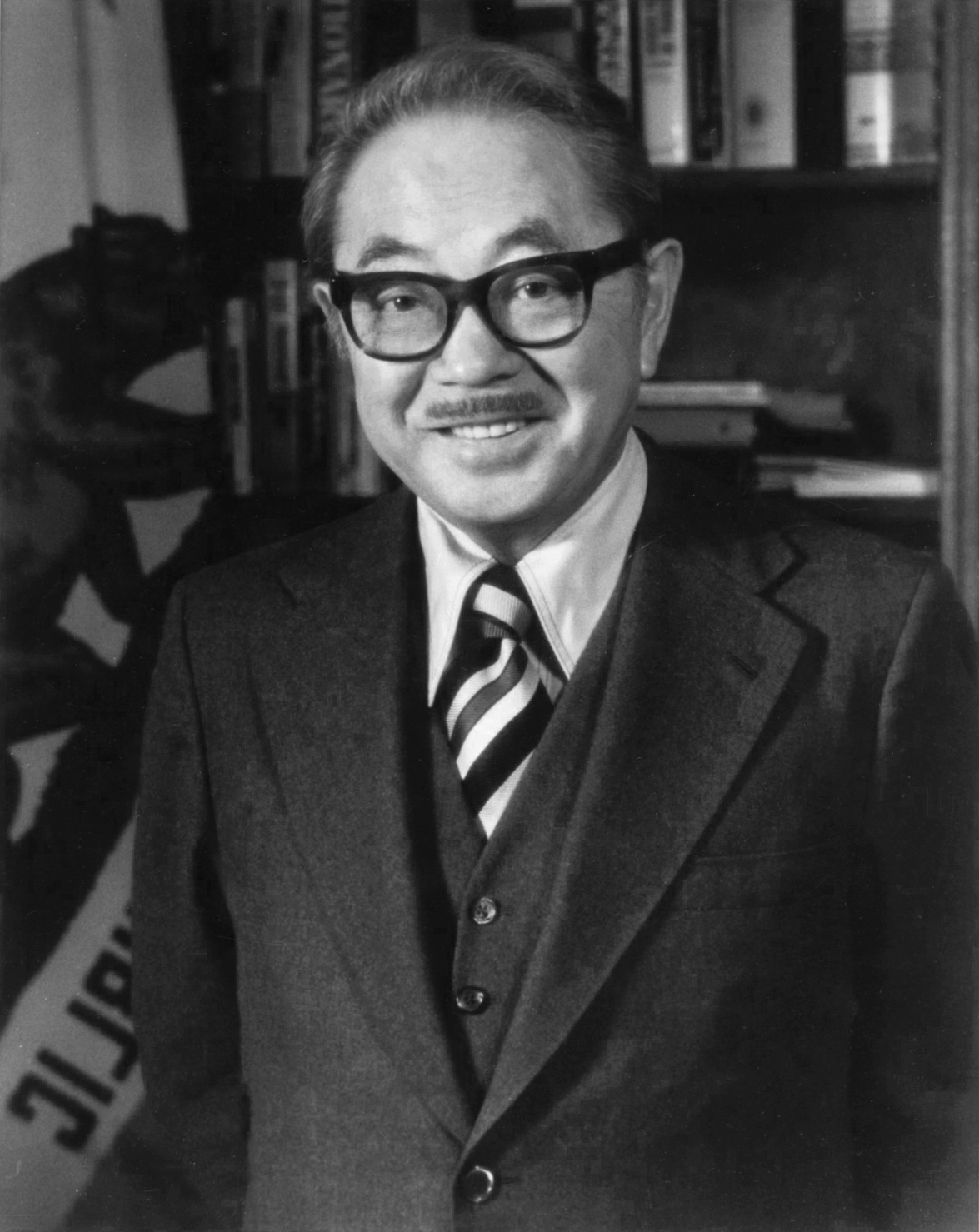
- Official portrait, 1981

United States Senator from California
- In office January 2, 1977 – January 3, 1983
- Preceded by: John V. Tunney
- Succeeded by: Pete Wilson

9th President of San Francisco State University
- In office November 26, 1968 – July 10, 1973
- Preceded by: Robert Smith
- Succeeded by: Paul Romberg

Personal details
- Born: Samuel Ichiye Hayakawa; July 18, 1906 Vancouver, British Columbia, Canada
- Died: February 27, 1992 (aged 85) Greenbrae, California, U.S.
- Party: Republican (from 1973)
- Other political affiliations: Democratic (before 1973)
- Spouse: Margedant Peters
- Children: 3
- Education: University of Manitoba (BA); McGill University (MA); University of Wisconsin, Madison (PhD)

Academic background
- Thesis: Oliver Wendell Holmes: Physician, poet, essayist (1935)
- Influences: Alfred Korzybski

Academic work
- Discipline: English
- Sub-discipline: Semantics
- Institutions: University of Wisconsin, Madison; Armour Institute of Technology; University of Chicago; San Francisco State College
- Notable works: Language in Thought and Action

Samuel Ichiye Hayakawa (Japanese: 早川 一衛, July 18, 1906 – February 27, 1992) was a Canadian-born American academic and politician. A professor of English, he served as president of San Francisco State University and then as a U.S. Senator from California from 1977 to 1983.

Hayakawa was born in Vancouver, British Columbia, Canada, to Japanese immigrants. Hayakawa advocated for Japanese Canadian voting rights in the 1930s. In the 1950s, he became a professor at the University of Chicago before moving to teach English at San Francisco State College. After becoming acting president of San Francisco State College, Hayakawa became a conservative icon after he unplugged the loudspeakers on a student protesters' van at an outdoor rally in late 1968.

Hayakawa ran to represent California in the United States Senate as a Republican in 1976. He narrowly defeated incumbent Democratic senator John V. Tunney, becoming the first Asian-American senator from the state. Hayakawa supported former California governor Ronald Reagan in the 1980 presidential election. He initially sought reelection in 1982, but bowed out of the race due to a lack of funds and was succeeded by fellow Republican Pete Wilson.

== Early life, education, and activism in Canada ==
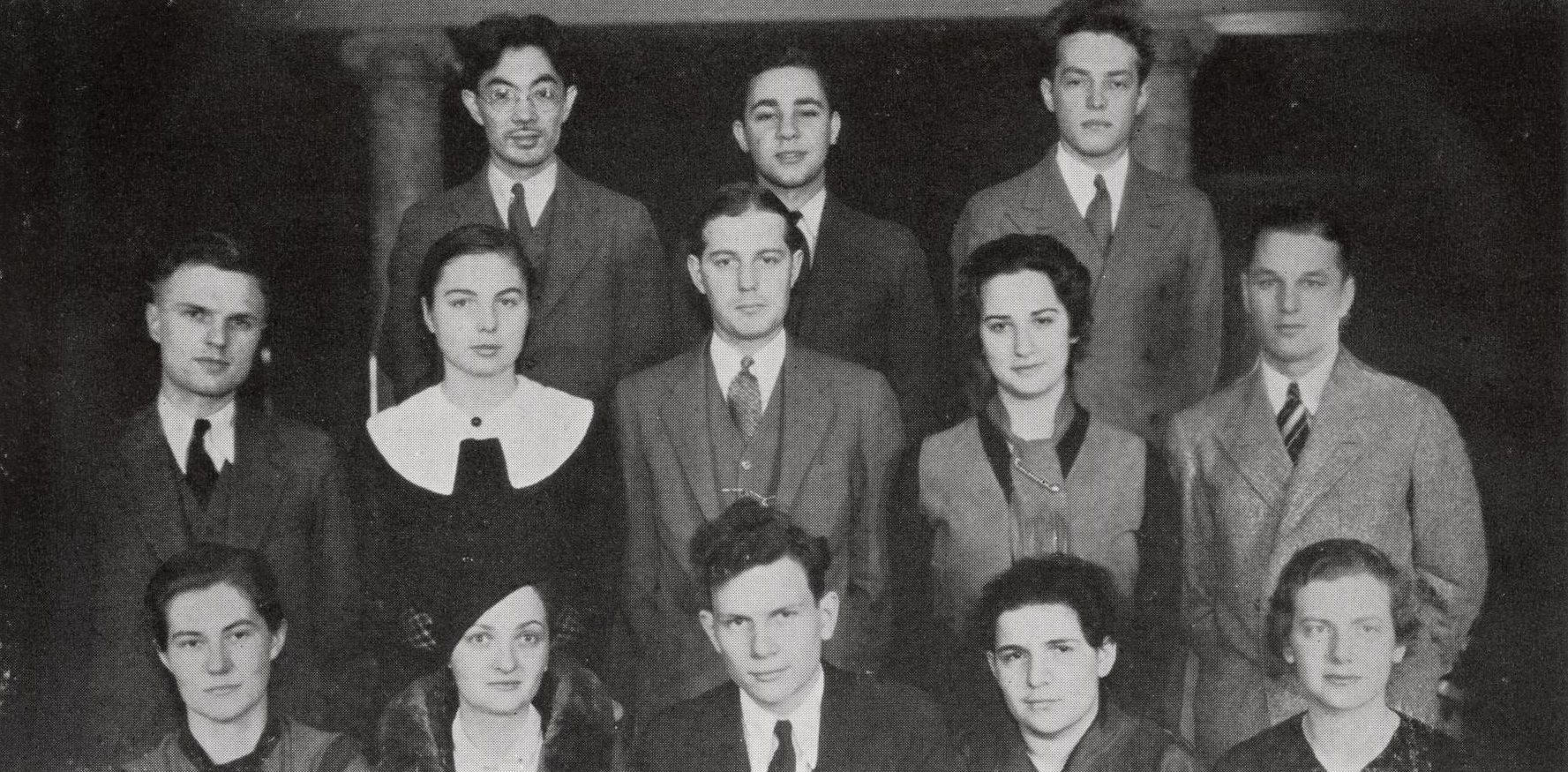
Hayakawa (top row, left) with other staff members of The Rocking Horse, a student paper at the University of Wisconsin–Madison, 1934

His parents were Japanese immigrants Ichiro Hayakawa and Otoko Toro (née Isono) Hayakawa. Born in Vancouver, British Columbia, Hayakawa was educated in the public schools of Calgary, Alberta, and Winnipeg, Manitoba, and graduated from the University of Manitoba in 1927. He received his MA in English from McGill University in 1928 and his PhD in the discipline from the University of Wisconsin–Madison in 1935.

=== Advocacy for Japanese Canadian voting rights ===
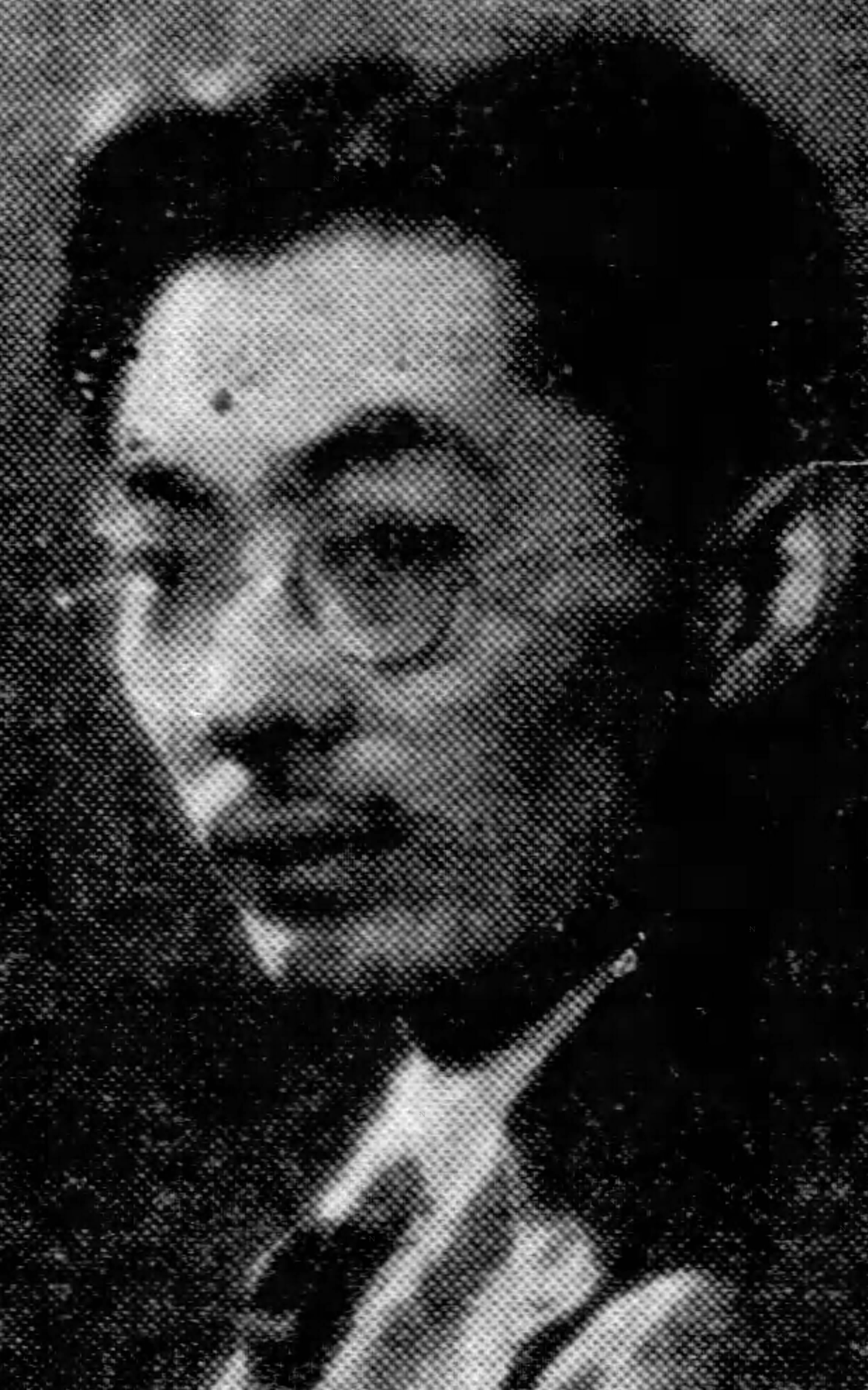
Portrait by Harold Hone c. 1936

In 1936, the Japanese Canadian Citizens' League, an organization created to advocate for voting rights for Japanese Canadians, sent a four-person delegation to speak to the federal government. Hayakawa was chosen alongside schoolteacher Hide Hyodo Shimizu, dentist Dr. Edward Banno, and insurance agent Minoru Kobayashi.

At that time, those who could not vote in provincial elections also could not vote in federal elections. Since Japanese Canadians had been denied the vote in British Columbia, where the bulk of Canada's Japanese population lived, most Japanese Canadians also could not vote in federal elections. On May 22, 1936, in Ottawa, the delegation presented to the Special Committee on Elections and Franchise Acts, which was discussing the possibility of granting voting rights to Japanese Canadians. Despite the fact that all four delegates were Canadian born and that Hayakawa was an English professor, the committee members seemed surprised by their fluency in English. One said, they spoke "English so fluently that if [they] did not see [them] face to face [they] would take [them] to be Englishmen." Another congratulated them "on their splendid command of the English language" and "on what they [had] done to help built up Canada." Nonetheless, the delegation returned home only to learn that the committee had decided to deny Japanese Canadians the franchise, which they would not receive until after the Second World War.

== Academic career ==
Hayakawa lectured at the University of Chicago from 1950 to 1955. He presented a talk at the 1954 Conference of Activity Vector Analysts at Lake George, New York, in which he discussed a theory of personality based on general semantics; it was later published as The Semantic Barrier. The lecture discussed the Darwinism of the "survival of self" as contrasted with the "survival of self-concept." His ideas influenced science fiction writer A. E. van Vogt's novels The World of Null-A and The Pawns of Null-A, and he is mentioned in the author's introduction to a reprint of the former.

Hayakawa was an English professor at San Francisco State College (now San Francisco State University) from 1955 to 1968. In the early 1960s, he helped organize the "Anti Digit Dialing League", a San Francisco group that opposed the introduction of all-digit telephone exchange names. Among his students at San Francisco State College were activist Stephen Gaskin and author Gerald Haslam. He was named acting president of the institution during a student strike on November 26, 1968. On July 9, 1969, the California State Colleges board of trustees appointed Hayakawa the ninth president of San Francisco State. Hayakawa retired on July 10, 1973.

Hayakawa wrote a column for the Register and Tribune Syndicate from 1970 to 1976.

=== Student strike at San Francisco State College ===
From November 1968 to March 1969, there was a student strike at San Francisco State College seeking to establish an ethnic studies program at the school. The strike was led by New Left organizations including the Black Student Union, the Third World Liberation Front, Students for a Democratic Society, the Black Panther Party, and the countercultural community.

The students presented fifteen "non-negotiable demands" to the administration, including the creation of a Black studies department independent of the university administration to be chaired by sociologist Nathan Hare, open admission for all black students to "put an end to racism", and the immediate end to the university's involvement in the Vietnam War; they threatened that, if these demands were not immediately and completely satisfied, the entire campus would be forcibly shut down. Hayakawa became popular with conservatives during this period after he pulled out the wires from the loudspeakers on a protesters' van at an outdoor rally. Hayakawa relented on December 6, 1968, and announced the creation of a Black studies program at the university chaired by Hare.

== Political career ==
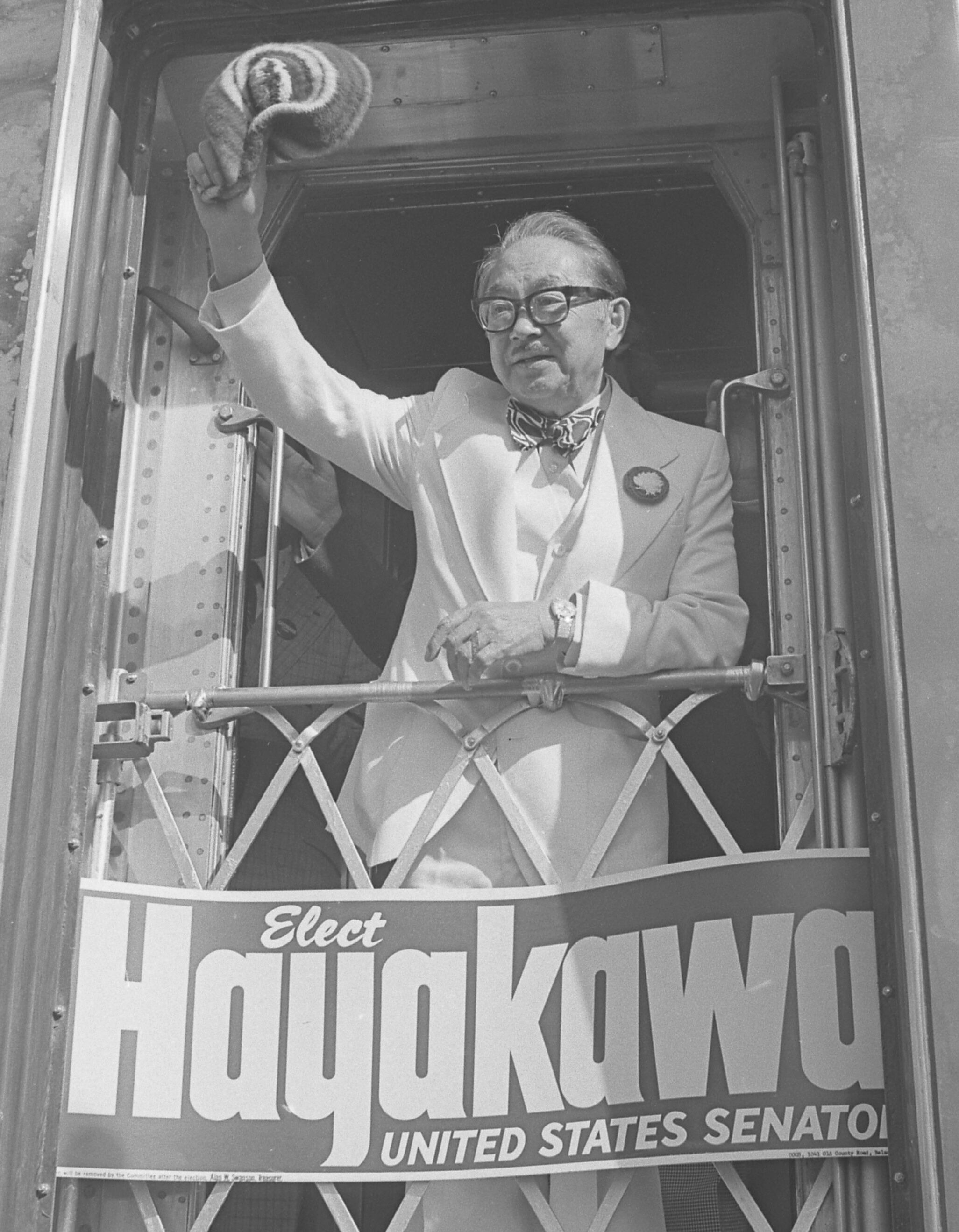
Hayakawa, while campaigning for US Senate in 1976

In 1973, Hayakawa changed his political affiliation from the Democratic Party to the Republican Party.

Hayakawa launched a campaign for the U.S. Senate in 1976, and won an unexpected victory in the Republican primary over three better-known career politicians: former HEW Secretary Robert Finch, long-time U.S. Representative Alphonzo Bell, and former California lieutenant governor John L. Harmer. Much like Democratic presidential nominee Jimmy Carter, Hayakawa touted himself as a political outsider.

Incumbent Democratic senator John Tunney had faced a surprisingly strong primary challenge from activist Tom Hayden. Hayden's candidacy forced Tunney to run more to the left in the primary, which Hayakawa exploited in the general election.

Comfortably ahead in the polls, Tunney did not aggressively campaign until the final weeks before the election. However, Hayakawa's position as a political outsider was popular in the wake of the Watergate scandal, and Tunney had a high absenteeism rate while serving in the Senate and missed numerous votes. Hayakawa exploited this with a television ad that showed an empty chair in the Senate chamber. Hayakawa gradually closed the gap with Tunney, and ultimately defeated him by just over three percentage points.

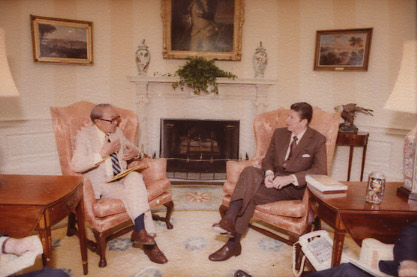
Hayakawa with President Reagan at the White House, 1981

During his Senate campaign, Hayakawa said of the Panama Canal Zone that "We should hang on to it. We stole it fair and square." While in office, however, he helped win Senate approval of the Torrijos–Carter Treaties, which transferred control of the canal back to Panama. He also supported a bill that led to the creation of the Commission on Wartime Relocation and Internment of Civilians, which examined the causes and effects of the internment of Japanese Americans during World War II, though he argued that internment was beneficial and that Japanese Americans should not be paid reparations for "fulfilling their obligations" to submit to Executive Order 9066. (Having lived in Chicago as a Canadian citizen during the war, Hayakawa was not subjected to internment.) During his time in the Senate, Hayakawa was one of three Japanese Americans in the chamber, along with Daniel Inouye and Spark Matsunaga of Hawaii.

Hayakawa was often found napping during Senate proceedings, which the media widely reported on.

While Hayakawa initially planned to run for re-election in 1982, he trailed other Republican candidates badly in early polls and was short on funds. He dropped out of the race early in the year and was succeeded by fellow Republican Pete Wilson. To date, he is the only Japanese American Republican to have served in the Senate.

Hayakawa and anti-immigration activist John Tanton founded the lobbying organization U.S. English, dedicated to making English the official language of the United States.

== Personal life ==
Hayakawa was a resident of Mill Valley, California. He died at a hospital in nearby Greenbrae, California, on February 27, 1992, at the age of 85, from complications of a stroke and bronchitis. His daughter, Wynne Hayakawa, is a painter.

He had an abiding interest in trad jazz and wrote extensively on that subject, including several sets of album liner notes. Jazz pianist Don Ewell sometimes assisted Hayakawa in his lectures.

== See also ==
- List of Asian Americans and Pacific Islander Americans in the United States Congress
- List of United States senators born outside the United States

== Bibliography ==
- Hayakawa, S. I. Choose the Right Word: A Modern Guide to Synonyms and Related Words. 1968. Reprint. New York: Perennial Library, 1987. Originally published as Funk & Wagnalls Modern Guide to Synonyms and Related Words.
- Hayakawa, S. I. "Education Revisited". In The World Today, edited by Phineas J. Sparer. Memphis: Memphis State University Press, 1975.
- Hayakawa, S. I. Language in Thought and Action. 1939. Enlarged ed. San Diego: Harcourt Brace Jovanovich, 1978. Originally published as Language in Action.
- Hayakawa, S. I. Symbol, Status, and Personality. New York: Harcourt, Brace & World, 1963.
- Hayakawa, S. I. Through the Communication Barrier: On Speaking, Listening, and Understanding. Edited by Arthur Chandler. New York: Harper & Row, 1979.
- Hayakawa, S. I., ed. Language, Meaning, and Maturity. New York: Harper & Brothers, 1954.
- Hayakawa, S. I., ed. Our Language and Our World. 1959. Reprint. Freeport, NY: Books for Libraries Press, 1971.
- Hayakawa, S. I., ed. The Use and Misuse of Language. Greenwich, CT: Fawcett Publications, 1964.
- Hayakawa, S. I., and William Dresser, eds. Dimensions of Meaning. Indianapolis: Bobbs-Merrill Co., 1970. Includes Hayakawa's essays "General Semantics and the Cold War Mentality" and "Semantics and Sexuality".
- Paris, Richard, and Janet Brown, eds. Quotations from Chairman S. I. Hayakawa. San Francisco: n.p., 1969.

Academic offices
Preceded by Robert Smith	President of San Francisco State University; 1968–1973	Succeeded by Paul Romberg
Party political offices
Preceded by George Murphy	Republican nominee for U.S. Senator from California (Class 1); 1976	Succeeded by Pete Wilson
U.S. Senate
Preceded by John V. Tunney	U.S. Senator (Class 1) from California; 1977–1983; Served alongside: Alan Cranston	Succeeded by Pete Wilson
