= Science and Sanity =

1933 book by Alfred Korzybski

- Cover of the 2nd edition
- Author: Alfred Korzybski
- Language: English
- Subject: General semantics, philosophy, epistemology
- Genre: Non-fiction
- Published: 1933
- Publication place: United States
- Media type: Print
- Pages: 798
- OCLC: 2079431
- LC Class: B820 .K6 1933

Science and Sanity: An Introduction to Non-Aristotelian Systems and General Semantics is a 1933 philosophy book written by Alfred Korzybski (1879–1950). Published by the Institute of General Semantics, it remains in print, the sixth edition released in 2023. It's considered Korzybski's magnum opus. It was by this book's influence that general semantics became known to the public. In some countries, the book is already in the public domain.

== Background ==
Korzybski presented his most famous epistemological arguments in Science and Sanity:

Humans' knowledge of the world is limited by both the human nervous system and the languages they have developed, and thus no human can have direct access to reality, given that the most they can know is that which is filtered through the brain's responses to reality.

His best known dictum is "The map is not the territory": He argued that most people confuse reality with its conceptual model.

== Content ==
The philosophical book covers a wide range of subjects, including neurology and psychology.

Korzybski argued that common natural languages are of limited value in sciences. He wanted to help humankind to create better languages to handle reality. He expressed convictions in his formulation of a thesis where he saw structural similarity between languages and what their words represent, and concluded that mathematics is the only language whose structure is similar to that of the world and of the human nervous system.

He advocated for the necessity of more rigor in both mathematics and physics.

In the book, Korzybski makes distinction between the words "insane" and "unsane".

The book argues for the use of non-Aristotelian logic in the sciences. Korzybski was accused of being anti-Aristotle. In fact, in Science and Sanity, Korzybski calls Aristotle delusional, rejecting his metaphysics entirely.

== Selections ==
Korzybski intended the book to serve as a training manual. In 1948, Korzybski authorized publication of Selections from Science and Sanity after educators voiced concerns that at more than 800 pages, the full book was too bulky and expensive.

== Translations ==
It was translated into French by Patrick Hug, with the title Science et Sanité: Une Introduction Aux Systèmes Non-Aristotéliciens Et À La Sémantique Générale.

== See also ==
- Kritik der reinen Vernunft, a book by Immanuel Kant with some similar, but essentially different, epistemological arguments
- Thing-in-itself
