= General semantics =

School of thought on cognition and problem-solving

General semantics is a school of thought that incorporates philosophic and scientific aspects. Although it does not stand on its own as a separate school of philosophy, a separate science, or an academic discipline, it describes itself as a scientifically empirical approach to cognition and problem solving. It has been described by nonproponents as a self-help system, and it has been criticized as having pseudoscientific aspects, but it has also been favorably viewed by various scientists as a useful set of analytical tools albeit not its own science.

General semantics is concerned with how phenomena (observable events) translate to perceptions, how they are further modified by the names and labels we apply to them, and how we might gain a measure of control over our own cognitive, emotional, and behavioral responses. Proponents characterize general semantics as an antidote to certain kinds of delusional thought patterns in which incomplete and possibly warped mental constructs are projected onto the world and treated as reality itself. Accurate map–territory relations are a central theme.

After partial launches under the names human engineering and humanology, Polish-American originator Alfred Korzybski (1879–1950) fully launched the program as general semantics in 1933 with the publication of Science and Sanity: An Introduction to Non-Aristotelian Systems and General Semantics.

In Science and Sanity, general semantics is presented as both a theoretical and a practical system whose adoption can reliably alter human behavior in the direction of greater sanity. In the 1947 preface to the third edition of Science and Sanity, Korzybski wrote: "We need not blind ourselves with the old dogma that 'human nature cannot be changed', for we find that it can be changed." While Korzybski considered his program to be empirically based and to strictly follow the scientific method, general semantics has been described as veering into the domain of pseudoscience.

Starting around 1940, university English professor S. I. Hayakawa (1906–1992), speech professor Wendell Johnson, speech professor Irving J. Lee, and others assembled elements of general semantics into a package suitable for incorporation into mainstream communications curricula. The Institute of General Semantics, which Korzybski and co-workers founded in 1938, continues today. General semantics as a movement has waned considerably since the 1950s, although many of its ideas live on in other movements, such as media literacy, neuro-linguistic programming and rational emotive behavior therapy.

== Overview ==
=== "Identification" and "the silent level" ===
In the 1946 "Silent and Verbal Levels" diagram, the arrows and boxes denote ordered stages in human neuro-evaluative processing that happens in an instant. Although newer knowledge in biology has more sharply defined what the text in these 1946 boxes labels "electro-colloidal", the diagram remains, as Korzybski wrote in his last published paper in 1950, "satisfactory for our purpose of explaining briefly the most general and important points". General semantics postulates that most people "identify," or fail to differentiate the serial stages or "levels" within their own neuro-evaluative processing. "Most people," Korzybski wrote, "identify in value levels I, II, III, and IV and react as if our verbalizations about the first three levels were 'it.' Whatever we may say something 'is' obviously is not the 'something' on the silent levels."

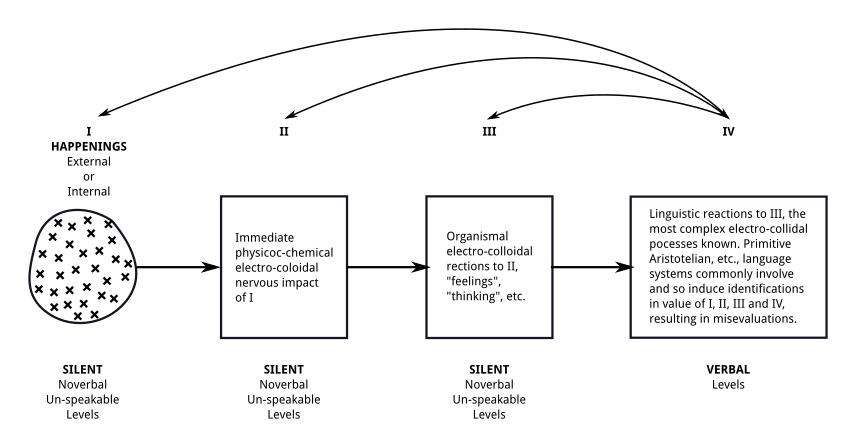
Institute of General Semantics "Silent and Verbal Levels" diagram, circa 1946

By making it a 'mental' habit to find and keep one's bearings among the ordered stages, general semantics training seeks to sharpen internal orientation much as a GPS device may sharpen external orientation. Once trained, general semanticists affirm, a person will act, respond, and make decisions more appropriate to any given set of happenings. Although producing saliva constitutes an appropriate response when lemon juice drips onto the tongue, a person has inappropriately identified when an imagined lemon or the word "l–e–m–o–n" triggers a salivation response.

"Once we differentiate, differentiation becomes the denial of identity," Korzybski wrote in Science and Sanity. "Once we discriminate among the objective and verbal levels, we learn 'silence' on the unspeakable objective levels, and so introduce a most beneficial neurological 'delay'—engage the cortex to perform its natural function." British-American philosopher Max Black, an influential critic of general semantics, called this neurological delay the "central aim" of general semantics training, "so that in responding to verbal or nonverbal stimuli, we are aware of what it is that we are doing".

=== Abstracting and consciousness of abstracting ===
Identification prevents what general semantics seeks to promote: the additional cortical processing experienced as a delay. Korzybski called his remedy for identification "consciousness of abstracting." The term "abstracting" occurs ubiquitously in Science and Sanity. Korzybski's use of the term is somewhat unusual and requires study to understand his meaning. He discussed the problem of identification in terms of "confusions of orders of abstractions" and "lack of consciousness of abstracting". To be conscious of abstracting is to differentiate among the "levels" described above; levels II–IV being abstractions of level I (whatever level I "is"—all we really get are abstractions). The techniques Korzybski prescribed to help a person develop consciousness of abstracting he called "extensional devices".

=== Extensional devices ===
Satisfactory accounts of general semantics extensional devices can be found easily. This article seeks to explain briefly only the "indexing" devices. Suppose you teach in a school or university. Students enter your classroom on the first day of a new term, and, if you identify these new students to a memory association retrieved by your brain, you under-engage your powers of observation and your cortex. Indexing makes explicit a differentiating of students_{this term} from students_{prior terms}. You survey the new students, and indexing explicitly differentiates student_{1} from student_{2} from student_{3}, etc. Suppose you recognize one student—call her Anna—from a prior course in which Anna either excelled or did poorly. Again, you escape identification by your indexed awareness that Anna_{this term, this course} is different from Anna_{that term, that course}. Not identifying, you both expand and sharpen your apprehension of "students" with an awareness rooted in fresh silent-level observations.

=== Language as a core concern ===
Autoassociative memory in the memory-prediction model describes neural operations in mammalian brains generally. A special circumstance for humans arises with the introduction of language components, both as fresh stimuli and as stored representations. Language considerations figure prominently in general semantics, and three language and communications specialists who embraced general semantics, university professors and authors Hayakawa, Wendell Johnson and Neil Postman, played major roles in framing general semantics, especially for non-readers of Science and Sanity.

=== Criticism ===
Korzybski wrote in the preface to the third edition of Science and Sanity (1947) that general semantics "turned out to be an empirical natural science". But the type of existence, if any, of universals and abstract objects is an issue of serious debate within metaphysical philosophy. So Black summed up general semantics as "some hypothetical neurology fortified with dogmatic metaphysics". And in 1952, two years after Korzybski died, American skeptic Martin Gardner wrote, "[Korzybski's] work moves into the realm of cultism and pseudo-science."

Former Institute of General Semantics executive director Steve Stockdale has compared GS to yoga. "First, I'd say that there is little if any benefit to be gained by just knowing something about general semantics. The benefits come from maintaining an awareness of the principles and attitudes that are derived from GS and applying them as they are needed. You can sort of compare general semantics to yoga in that respect... knowing about yoga is okay, but to benefit from yoga you have to do yoga." Similarly, Kenneth Burke explains Korzybski's kind of semantics contrasting it, in A Grammar of Motives, with a kind of Burkean poetry by saying "Semantics is essentially scientist, an approach to language in terms of knowledge, whereas poetic forms are kinds of action".

== History ==
=== Early attempts at validation ===
The First American Congress for General Semantics convened in March 1935 at the Central Washington College of Education in Ellensburg, Washington. In introductory remarks to the participants, Korzybski said:

General semantics formulates a new experimental branch of natural science, underlying an empirical theory of human evaluations and orientations and involving a definite neurological mechanism, present in all humans. It discovers direct neurological methods for the stimulation of the activities of the human cerebral cortex and the direct introduction of beneficial neurological 'inhibition'....

He added that general semantics "will be judged by experimentation". One paper presented at the congress reported dramatic score improvements for college sophomores on standardized intelligence tests after six weeks of training by methods prescribed in Chapter 29 of Science and Sanity.

=== Interpretation as semantics ===
General semantics accumulated only a few early experimental validations. In 1938, economist and writer Stuart Chase praised and popularized Korzybski in The Tyranny of Words. Chase called Korzybski "a pioneer" and described Science and Sanity as "formulating a genuine science of communication. The term which is coming into use to cover such studies is 'semantics,' matters having to do with signification or meaning." Because Korzybski, in Science and Sanity, had articulated his program using "semantic" as a standalone qualifier on hundreds of pages in constructions like "semantic factors," "semantic disturbances," and especially "semantic reactions," to label the general semantics program "semantics" amounted to only a convenient shorthand.

Hayakawa read The Tyranny of Words, then Science and Sanity, and in 1939 he attended a Korzybski-led workshop conducted at the newly organized Institute of General Semantics in Chicago. In the introduction to his own Language in Action, a 1941 Book of the Month Club selection, Hayakawa wrote, "[Korzybski's] principles have in one way or another influenced almost every page of this book...." Hayakawa followed Chase's lead in interpreting general semantics as making communication its defining concern. When Hayakawa co-founded the Society for General Semantics and its publication ETC: A Review of General Semantics in 1943, Korzybski and his followers at the Institute of General Semantics began to complain that Hayakawa had wrongly coopted general semantics. In 1985, Hayakawa gave this defense to an interviewer: "I wanted to treat general semantics as a subject, in the same sense that there's a scientific concept known as gravitation, which is independent of Isaac Newton. So after a while, you don't talk about Newton anymore; you talk about gravitation. You talk about semantics and not Korzybskian semantics."

=== Lowered sights ===
The regimen in the Institute's seminars, greatly expanded as team-taught seminar-workshops starting in 1944, continued to develop following the prescriptions laid down in Chapter XXIX of Science and Sanity. The structural differential, patented by Korzybski in the 1920s, remained among the chief training aids to help students reach "the silent level," a prerequisite for achieving "neurological delay". Innovations in the seminar-workshops included a new "neuro-relaxation" component, led by dancer and Institute editorial secretary Charlotte Schuchardt (1909–2002).

But although many people were introduced to general semantics—perhaps the majority through Hayakawa's more limited 'semantics'—superficial lip service seemed more common than the deep internalization that Korzybski and his co-workers at the Institute aimed for. Marjorie Kendig (1892–1981), probably Korzybski's closest co-worker, director of the Institute after his death, and editor of his posthumously published Collected Writings: 1920–1950, wrote in 1968:

I would guess that I have known about 30 individuals who have in some degree adequately, by my standards, mastered this highly general, very simple, very difficult system of orientation and method of evaluating—reversing as it must all our cultural conditioning, neurological canalization, etc.... To me the great error Korzybski made—and I carried on, financial necessity—and for which we pay the price today in many criticisms, consisted in not restricting ourselves to training very thoroughly a very few people who would be competent to utilize the discipline in various fields and to train others. We should have done this before encouraging anyone to popularize or spread the word (horrid phrase) in societies for general semantics, by talking about general semantics instead of learning, using, etc. the methodology to change our essential epistemological assumptions, premises, etc. (unconscious or conscious), i.e. the un-learning basic to learning to learn.

Yes, large numbers of people do enjoy making a philosophy of general semantics. This saves them the pain of rigorous training so simple and general and limited that it seems obvious when said, yet so difficult.

Successors at the Institute of General Semantics continued for many years along the founders' path. Stuart Mayper (1916–1997), who studied under Karl Popper, introduced Popper's principle of falsifiability into the seminar-workshops he led at the Institute starting in 1977. More modest pronouncements gradually replaced Korzybski's claims that general semantics can change human nature and introduce an era of universal human agreement. In 2000, Robert Pula (1928–2004), whose roles at the Institute over three decades included Institute director, editor-in-chief of the Institute's General Semantics Bulletin, and leader of the seminar-workshops, characterized Korzybski's legacy as a "contribution toward the improvement of human evaluating, to the amelioration of human woe...."

Hayakawa died in 1992. The Society for General Semantics merged into the Institute of General Semantics in 2003. In 2007, Martin Levinson, president of the Institute's Board of Trustees, teamed with Paul D. Johnston, executive director of the Society at the date of the merger, to teach general semantics with a light-hearted Practical Fairy Tales for Everyday Living.

Other institutions supporting or promoting general semantics in the 21st century include the New York Society for General Semantics, the European Society for General Semantics, the Australian General Semantics Society, and the Balvant Parekh Centre for General Semantics and Other Human Sciences (Baroda, India).

== The major premises ==
- Non-Aristotelianism: While Aristotle wrote that a true definition gives the essence of the thing (defined in Greek to ti ên einai, literally "the what it was to be"), general semantics denies the existence of such an 'essence'. In this, general semantics purports to represent an evolution in human evaluative orientation. In general semantics, it is always possible to give a description of empirical facts, but such descriptions remain just that—descriptions—which necessarily leave out many aspects of the objective, microscopic, and submicroscopic events they describe. According to general semantics, language, natural or otherwise (including the language called 'mathematics') can be used to describe the taste of an orange, but one cannot give the taste of the orange using language alone. According to general semantics, the content of all knowledge is structure, so that language (in general) and science and mathematics (in particular) can provide people with a structural 'map' of empirical facts, but there can be no 'identity', only structural similarity, between the language (map) and the empirical facts as lived through and observed by people as humans-in-environments (including doctrinal and linguistic environments).
- Time binding: The human ability to pass information and knowledge from one generation to the next. Korzybski claimed this to be a unique capacity, separating people from animals. This distinctly human ability for one generation to start where a previous generation left off, is a consequence of the uniquely human ability to move to higher and higher levels of abstraction without limit. Animals may have multiple levels of abstraction, but their abstractions must stop at some finite upper limit; this is not so for humans: humans can have 'knowledge about knowledge', 'knowledge about knowledge about knowledge', etc., without any upper limit. Animals possess knowledge, but each generation of animals does things pretty much in the same way as the previous generation, limited by their neurology and genetic makeup. By contrast, at one time most human societies were hunter-gatherers, but now more advanced means of food production (growing, raising, or buying) predominate. Except for some insects (for example, ants), all animals are still hunter-gatherer species, even though many have existed longer than the human species. For this reason, animals are regarded in general semantics as space-binders (doing space-binding), and plants, which are usually stationary, as energy-binders (doing energy-binding).
- Non-elementalism and non-additivity: The refusal to separate verbally what cannot be separated empirically, and the refusal to regard such verbal splits as evidence that the 'things' that are verbally split bear an additive relation to one another. For example, space-time cannot empirically be split into 'space' + 'time', a conscious organism (including humans) cannot be split into 'body' + 'mind', etc., therefore, people should never speak of 'space' and 'time' or 'mind' and 'body' in isolation, but always use the terms space-time or mind-body (or other organism-as-a-whole terms).
- Infinite-valued determinism: General semantics regards the problem of 'indeterminism vs. determinism' as the failure of pre-modern epistemologies to formulate the issue properly, as the failure to consider or include all factors relevant to a particular prediction, and failure to adjust our languages and linguistic structures to empirical facts. General semantics resolves the issue in favor of determinism of a special kind called 'infinite-valued' determinism which always allows for the possibility that relevant 'causal' factors may be 'left out' at any given date, resulting in, if the issue is not understood at that date, 'indeterminism', which simply indicates that our ability to predict events has broken down, not that the world is 'indeterministic'. General semantics considers all human behavior (including all human decisions) as, in principle, fully determined once all relevant doctrinal and linguistic factors are included in the analysis, regarding theories of 'free will' as failing to include the doctrinal and linguistic environments as environments in the analysis of human behavior.

== Connections to other disciplines ==
The influence of Ludwig Wittgenstein and the Vienna Circle, and of early operationalists and pragmatists such as Charles Sanders Peirce, is particularly clear in the foundational ideas of general semantics. Korzybski himself acknowledged many of these influences.

The concept of "silence on the objective level"—attributed to Korzybski and his insistence on consciousness of abstracting—are parallel to some of the central ideas in Buddhism. Although Korzybski never acknowledged any influence from this quarter, later Zen-popularizer Alan Watts was influenced by ideas from general semantics.

General semantics has survived most profoundly in the cognitive therapies that emerged in the 1950s and 1960s. Albert Ellis (1913–2007), who developed rational emotive behavior therapy, acknowledged influence from general semantics and delivered the Alfred Korzybski Memorial Lecture in 1991. The Bruges (Belgium) center for solution-focused brief therapy operates under the name Korzybski Institute Training and Research Center. George Kelly, creator of personal construct psychology, was influenced by general semantics. Fritz Perls and Paul Goodman, founders of Gestalt therapy are said to have been influenced by Korzybski Wendell Johnson wrote "People in Quandaries: The Semantics of Personal Adjustment" in 1946, which stands as the first attempt to form a therapy from general semantics.

Ray Solomonoff (1926–2009) was influenced by Korzybski. Solomonoff was the inventor of algorithmic probability, and founder of algorithmic information theory (a.k.a. Kolmogorov complexity).

Another scientist influenced by Korzybski (verbal testimony) is Paul Vitanyi (born 1944), a scientist in the theory of computation.

During the 1940s, 1950s, and 1960s, general semantics entered the idiom of science fiction. Notable examples include the works of A. E. van Vogt, The World of Null-A and its sequels. General semantics appear also in Robert A. Heinlein's work, especially Gulf. Bernard Wolfe drew on general semantics in his 1952 science fiction novel Limbo. Frank Herbert's novels Dune and Whipping Star are also indebted to general semantics. The ideas of general semantics became a sufficiently important part of the shared intellectual toolkit of genre science fiction to merit parody by Damon Knight and others; they have since shown a tendency to reappear in the work of more recent writers such as Samuel R. Delany, Suzette Haden Elgin and Robert Anton Wilson. In 2008, John Wright extended van Vogt's Null-A series with Null-A Continuum. William Burroughs references Korzybski's time binding principle in his essay The Electronic Revolution, and elsewhere. Henry Beam Piper explicitly mentioned general semantics in Murder in the Gunroom, and its principles, such as awareness of the limitations of knowledge, are apparent in his later work. A fictional rendition of the Institute of General Semantics appears in the 1965 French science fiction film, Alphaville, directed by Jean-Luc Godard.

Neil Postman, founder of New York University's media ecology program in 1971, edited ETC: A Review of General Semantics from 1976 to 1986. Postman's student Lance Strate, a co-founder of the Media Ecology Association, served as executive director of the Institute of General Semantics from 2007 to 2010.

With Charles Weingartner, Neil Postman included General Semantics within the introductory background analysis in Teaching as a Subversive Activity (Delacorte, 1969). In particular, they argued that General Semantics fitted with what Postman and Weingartner referred to as the "Whorf-Sapir hypothesis", the claim that the particular language used to describe experience shapes how we perceive and understand that experience; that is, language shapes the way people think. (The "Whorf-Sapir hypothesis" is also known as Linguistic relativity.)

== See also ==
Related fields

- Cognitive science
- Cognitive therapy
- E-Prime
- Gestalt therapy
- Language and thought
- Linguistic relativity
- Perceptual control theory
- Rational emotive behavior therapy

Related subjects

- Cratylus (dialogue)
- Harold Innis's communications theories
- Institute of General Semantics
- Ladder of inference
- Map–territory relation
- Neuro-linguistic programming
- Propaganda
- Robert Anton Wilson § Probability reliance

Related persons

- Aristotle
- Gregory Bateson
- Sanford I. Berman
- Albert Ellis
- Elwood Murray
- Allen Walker Read
- Wilhelm Reich
- Ida Rolf
- William Vogt
- Robert Anton Wilson

Related books

- Levels of Knowing and Existence: Studies in General Semantics, by Harry L. Weinberg
- Language in Thought and Action, by Professor S.I. Hayakawa (later a U.S. Senator), popularizing the tenets of General Semantics
- The World of Null-A, a science fiction novel by A. E. van Vogt, which envisions a world run by General Semanticists
- Gulf, a science fiction novella by Robert A. Heinlein (published in Assignment in Eternity), in which a secret society trained in General Semantics and the techniques of Samuel Renshaw act to protect humanity
