= Sandy =

Sandy may refer to:

== People and fictional characters ==
- Sandy (given name), including a list of people and fictional characters with the given name or nickname
- Sandy (surname), a list of people
- Sandy (Iranian music band), Iranian singer, composer, arranger, and keyboard player
- Sandy (Brazilian singer), Brazilian singer and actress Sandy Leah Lima (born 1983)
- Sandy (Egyptian singer), Arabic singer Sandy Adel Ahmed Hussein (born 1986)
- Sandy (choreographer), Indian actor and choreographer
- (Sandy) Alex G, a former stage name of American singer-songwriter and multi-instrumentalist Alexander Giannascoli (born 1993)

== Places ==
- Sandy, Bedfordshire, England, a market town and civil parish
  - Sandy railway station
- Sandy, Carmarthenshire, Wales
- Sandy, Florida, an unincorporated area in Manatee County
- Sandy, Oregon, a city
- Sandy, Pennsylvania, a census-designated place
- Sandy, Utah, a city
- Sandy, Kanawha County, West Virginia, an unincorporated community
- Sandy, Monongalia County, West Virginia, an unincorporated community
- Sandy, Taylor County, West Virginia, an unincorporated community
- Sandy Bay (Newfoundland and Labrador)
- Sandy Bay, Gibraltar
- Sandy Bay, Hong Kong
- Sandy Bay, Saint Helena
- Sandy Beach, Hawaii
- Sandy Creek (disambiguation)
- Sandy Glacier, Oregon
- Sandy Island (disambiguation)
- Sandy Islands (disambiguation)
- Sandy Ridge, Hong Kong
- Sandy River (disambiguation)
- Sandy Township (disambiguation)

== Arts and entertainment ==
=== Music ===
- Sandy Records, a rock-and-roll label in Mobile, Alabama

==== Albums ====
- Sandy (Sandy Denny album), 1972
- Sandy (Sandy Lam album), 1987
- Sandy (Sandy Salisbury album), 2001

==== Songs ====
- "Sandy" (Larry Hall song), a song by Larry Hall from 1959
- "Sandy" (Dion DiMucci song), a song by Dion DiMucci from 1963
- "4th of July, Asbury Park (Sandy)", a 1973 song by Bruce Springsteen from The Wild, The Innocent and The E Street Shuffle
- "Sandy", a song by the Carpenters on A Kind of Hush, 1976
- "Sandy" (Grease song), a 1978 song sung by John Travolta in the film Grease
- "Sandy", a song sung by Aileen Quinn in Annie from 1982

=== Other arts and entertainment ===
- Sandy (novel), a popular 1905 novel by Alice Hegan Rice
- Sandy (1918 film), an American silent drama film starring Jack Pickford
- Sandy (1926 film), an American drama film starring Madge Bellamy

== Other uses ==
- Hurricane Sandy, a tropical cyclone of the 2012 Atlantic hurricane season
- Operation Sandy, a test launch of a V-2 rocket in 1947 from the aircraft carrier USS Midway
- Sandy, or sandy whiting, common name for the fish species Pseudaphritis urvillii
- "Sandy", the nickname for search and rescue (SAR) escort duty typically flown by the A-1 Skyraider
- Sandy (log canoe), Sherwood, Maryland, on the National Register of Historic Places
- Sandy's, a former fast-food chain purchased by Hardee's in 1979
- Sandy, a.k.a. Sandman, a character in the 2012 film Rise of the Guardians

== See also ==
- Sandhi, a variety of phonological processes
- Sandi (disambiguation)
- Sandie (disambiguation)
