= Aleksandrs =

- Gender: Male
- Name day: 18 November

Origin
- Region of origin: Latvia

Other names
- Related names: Aleksandra, Sandis, Sandris

Aleksandrs is a Latvian masculine given name. It is a cognate of the name Alexander and may refer to:

- Aleksandrs Ābrams (1904–1958), Latvian football forward
- Aleksandrs Beļavskis (born 1964) Latvian ice hockey player and team captain
- Aleksandrs Čaks (1901–1950), Latvian poet and writer
- Aleksandrs Cauņa (born 1988), Latvian football player
- Aleksandrs Čekulajevs (born 1985), Latvian footballer
- Aleksandrs Dibrivnijs (born 1969), Latvian footballer
- Aleksandrs Fertovs (born 1987), Latvian footballer
- Aleksandrs Glazovs (born 1970), Latvian football midfielder
- Aleksandrs Golubovs (1959–2010), Latvian politician
- Aleksandrs Isakovs (born 1973), Latvian football defender
- Aleksandrs Jackēvičs (born 1958), Latvian judoka and Olympic medalist
- Aleksandrs Jakushin (born 1991), Latvian ice dancer
- Aleksandrs Jeļisejevs (born 1971), Latvian football striker
- Aleksandrs Jerofejevs (born 1984), Latvian ice hockey defenceman
- Aleksandrs Kerčs (born 1967), Latvian ice hockey left wing
- Aleksandrs Kokarevs (born 1955), Latvian football player and manager
- Aleksandrs Koliņko (born 1975), Latvian professional football player
- Aleksandrs Kublinskis (1936–2018), Latvian composer
- Aleksandrs Kulakovs (born 1956), Latvian football goalkeeper
- Aleksandrs Laime (1911–1994), Latvian explorer
- Aleksandrs Leimanis (1913–1990), Latvian film director
- Aleksandrs Ņiživijs (born 1976), Latvian ice hockey player
- Aleksandrs Obižajevs (born 1959), Latvian pole vaulter and Olympic competitor
- Aleksandrs Petukhovs (born 1967), Latvian screenwriter and film director
- Aleksandrs Roge (born 1898), Latvian footballer
- Aleksandrs Samoilovs (born 1985), Latvian beach volleyball player and Olympic competitor
- Aleksandrs Semjonovs (born 1972), Latvian ice hockey centre and Olympic competitor
- Aleksandrs Solovjovs (born 1988), Latvian football player
- Aleksandrs Stankus (1907–1944), Latvian footballer
- Aleksandrs Starkovs (born 1955), Latvian footballer and football coach
- Aleksandrs Vanags (1919–1986), Latvian footballer and basketball player
- Aleksandrs Viļumanis (born 1942), Latvian conductor
