= Sandy (given name) =

- Pronunciation: /ˈsændi/
- Gender: Unisex
- Language: English

Origin
- Languages: English, Greek
- Origin: 1. Alexander; 2. Sander; 3. Alexandra; 4. Cassandra; 5. Sandra; 6. Sanford; 7. Cassander
- Region of origin: English-speaking world

Other names
- Variant forms: Sandie; Sandi
- Related names: Alexander, Alexandra, Sandra, Sander, Cassandra, Sanford, Santiago, Alasdair, Sandipan, Sandeep

Sandy is a popular unisex given name. It is often short for other names. Spelling variations include Sandi and Sandie.

Notable people named Sandy include:

== Men ==
- Sandy Alcántara (born 1995), Dominican baseball pitcher
- Sandy Alderson (born 1947), American baseball executive
- Sandy Allan (born 1947), Scottish footballer
- Sandy Alomar Jr. (born 1966), Puerto Rican baseball player
- Sandy Alomar Sr. (born 1943), Puerto Rican baseball player
- Sandy Amorós (1930–1992), Cuban baseball player
- Sandy Becker (1922–1996), American actor and television host
- Sandy Brown (1929–1975), Scottish jazz clarinetist
- Sandy Cohen (born 1995), American-Israeli basketball player in the Israeli Basketball Premier League
- Sandy Collins (born 1978), Canadian politician
- Sandy Dvore (1934–2020), American artist
- Sandy Flockhart (born 1951), British banker
- Sandy Frank (born 1929), American television producer
- Sandy Gall (1927–2025), British newsreader and journalist
- Sandy Gunn (1919–1944), British Second World War pilot and prisoner of war executed for participating in the "Great Escape"
- Sandy Hollway, Australian public servant
- Sandy Jardine (1948–2014), Scottish footballer
- Sandy Koufax (born 1935), American Major League Baseball Hall of Fame pitcher
- Sandy Lyle (born 1958), Scottish golfer
- Sandy Mayer (born 1952), American tennis player
- Sandy Munro (born 1938), Canadian-American engineer
- Sandy Nelson (1938–2022), American rock and roll drummer
- Sandy Nelson (footballer) Australian footballer
- Sandy Newbigging (1876–1976), Scottish footballer
- Sandy Powell (comedian) (1900–1982), British comedian
- Sandy Rothman (born 1946), American bluegrass musician and producer
- Sandy Sandberg (1910–1989), American football player
- Sandy Satullo II (born 1954), American former NASCAR Cup Series driver
- Sandy Smith (born 1983), Scottish visual artist
- Sandy Stuvik (born 1995), Thai racing driver
- Sandy Tatum (1920–2017), American attorney and golf administrator
- Sandy Walsh (born 1995), Indonesian footballer
- Sandy Wollaston (1875–1930), British explorer
- Sandy Woodward (1932–2013), nickname of British Admiral John Woodward

== Women ==
- Sandy Abi-Elias (born 1997), Lebanese-British footballer
- Sandy Chambers (born 1967), British singer
- Sandy Chan (born 1986), Hong Kong former swimmer who specialized in butterfly events
- Sandy Dennis (1937–1992), American actress
- Sandy Denny (1947–1978), British singer and songwriter
- Sandy Descher (born 1945), American actress
- Sandy Dillon (1960–2022), American singer and songwriter
- Sandy Donatucci, American politician
- Sandy Duncan (born 1946), American singer and actress
- Sandy Fox (born 1963), American singer and actress
- Sandy Green (singer) (born 1987), British singer and songwriter
- Sandy Heribert (born 1983), French-British TV journalist
- Sandy Johnson (born 1954), American model and actress
- Sandy Lam (born 1966), Hong Kong singer
- Sandy McGarry (born 1961), American politician from South Carolina
- Sandy Mölling (born 1981), German singer
- Sandhya Mridul (born 1975), Indian actress nicknamed Sandy
- Sandy Posey (born 1944), American singer
- Sandy Powell (costume designer) (born 1960), British costume designer
- Sandy Ratcliff (1948–2019), English actress
- Sandy Schreier, American fashion historian and collector
- Sandie Shaw (born 1947), English singer
- Sandy Shaw (writer) (born 1943), American writer on health
- Sandy Shaw (politician) (born 1960), Canadian politician
- Sandy Skinner (born 1988/1989), Saint-Pierrais politician
- Sandy Stone (born 1936), American author and performance artist
- Sandy Swinburne, American politician
- Sandi Thom (born 1981), Scottish singer-songwriter
- Sandi Toksvig (born 1958), British-Danish comedian, writer, actor, presenter and producer
- Sandy Verschoor (born 1959), Australian-Dutch politician and former Lord Mayor of Adelaide
- Sandy West (1959–2006), American musician, drummer in The Runaways
- Sandy Wollschlager (born 1957), American chemist and politician

== Fictional characters ==
- Sandy, a character in 2012 American horror film Sloppy the Psychotic
- Sandy, half of Julian and Sandy in the British radio comedy Round the Horne
- Sandy, Little Orphan Annie's dog
- Sandy, in Mark Twain's novel A Connecticut Yankee in King Arthur's Court
- Sandy, in the 1967 novel The Outsiders
- Sandy, a sandman in Kidsongs: Good Night, Sleep Tight by Arthur Beddard
- Sandy, in the Japanese television series Monkey based on Journey to the West
- Sandy, a rail speeder in the American-Canadian television series Thomas & Friends: All Engines Go!
- Sandy, a playable character in Supercell game Brawl Stars
- Sandy Bachman, in season 4 of the American television drama series Homeland
- Sandy Bigelow Patterson, in the 2013 American road comedy film Identity Thief
- Sandy Brown, from the Japanese anime The Noozles
- Sandy Cheeks, in the animated TV series SpongeBob SquarePants
- Sandy Cohen, in the TV series The OC, played by Peter Gallagher
- Sandy Hawkins, a DC Comics superhero
- Sandy Hogan, a character in the American sitcom television series The Hogan Family
- Sandy Kominsky, in the TV series The Kominsky Method
- Sandy Milkovich, a recurring character in the American TV series Shameless
- Sandy Olsson, in the 1978 musical film Grease
- Sandy Ricks, in the 1963 film Flipper
- Alejandro "Sandy" Stern, in the novel Presumed Innocent by Scott Turow and subsequent movie
- Sandy Stone, character played by Australian comedian Barry Humphries
- Sandy Sunshine, in the video games Mugen Souls and Mugen Souls Z
- Sandy Thomas, in the British soap opera Emmerdale
- Alexander Wilson, in the TV series Shetland
- Sha Wujing (Sandy), in the Chinese epic Journey to the West

== See also ==
- Sandy (disambiguation)
