= Sand Island =

A sand island is an island made up of sand.

Sand Island is the name of several places including:

== In the United States ==
- Sand Island (Alabama)
- Sand Island (Hawaii)
- Sand Island (Kentucky / Falls of the Ohio)
- Sand Island (Nevada)
- Sand Island (Oregon)
  - Sand Island (Clatsop County, Oregon)
  - Sand Island (Multnomah County, Oregon)
- Sand Island (Washington)
- Sand Island (Wisconsin), one of the Apostle Islands
  - Sand Island Light (Wisconsin)

== In United States territories ==
- An islet in Johnston Atoll
- An islet in Midway Atoll
- An islet in Palmyra Atoll
- An islet in Rose Atoll, part of American Samoa

== Elsewhere ==
- Sand Island (Anguilla)
- Sand Island (Wrocław)

== See also ==
- Sandy Island (disambiguation)
- Sable Island (French: île de Sable, literally "island of sand"), a 31 km² Canadian island situated about 175 km (109 mi) southeast of the closest point of mainland Nova Scotia in the North Atlantic Ocean
- Sand Islands in the South China Sea
  - Spratly Islands, the South Sand Islands
  - Paracel Islands, the West Sand Islands
  - Macclesfield Bank, the Middle Sand Islands
- Tromelin Island, historically known as the Isle of Sand, near Madagascar
