= Sandy, West Virginia =

Sandy, West Virginia may refer to the following unincorporated communities:

- Sandy, Kanawha County, West Virginia
- Sandy, Monongalia County, West Virginia
- Sandy, Taylor County, West Virginia

== See also ==
- Little Sandy, West Virginia, an unincorporated community in Preston County
- Big Sandy, West Virginia, a census-designated place in McDowell County
