= Sanford (given name) =

Sanford is a male given name of Old English origin, meaning "sandy ford". Notable people with the name include:

- Sanford Barsky, American professor of pathology
- Sanford Bates (1884–1972), American penologist, administrator and author
- Sanford Berman (born 1933), American librarian
- Sanford I. Berman (1924–2015), American philanthropist and author
- Sanford Dennis Biggar (fl. 1905–1906), Canadian politician
- Sanford Augustus Brookins (1877–1968), American architect and builder
- Sanford Diller (1928–2018), American billionaire
- Sanford Biggers (born 1970), American artist
- Sanford Bishop (born 1947), American politician
- Sanford Bookstaver (born 1973), American television director
- Sanford Brown (writer) (born 1957), American Methodist minister
- Sanford E. Charron (1917–2008), American politician
- Sanford E. Church (1815–1880), American lawyer and politician
- Sanford Clark (1935–2021), American singer and guitarist
- Sanford Lockwood Cluett (1874–1968), American businessman and inventor
- Sanford Coats (born 1971), American federal attorney
- Sanford Johnston Crowe (1868–1931), Canadian politician
- Sanford B. Dole (1844–1926), American politician and judge
- Sanford Jay Frank (1954–2014), American television writer
- Sanford Friedman (1928–2011), American novelist
- Sanford Garelik (1918–2011), American politician
- Sanford Robinson Gifford (1823–1880), American landscape painter
- Sanford Gold (1911–1984), American jazz pianist
- Sanford M. Green (1807–1901), American judge
- Sanford J. Grossman (born 1953), American economist and historian
- Sanford Hunt (1881–1943), American football player and newspaper editor
- Sanford Jackson (1909–2000), Canadian biochemist
- Sanford M. Jacoby (born 1953), American economist
- Sanford Kadish (1921–2014), American criminal law scholar
- Sanford Brown Kellogg (1822–1893), American lawyer and politician
- Sanford Kirkpatrick (1842–1932), American politician
- Sanford "Sandy" Koufax (born 1935), American Major League Baseball Hall of Fame pitcher
- Sanford Kwinter, Canadian-American writer and publisher
- Sanford R. Leigh (born 1934), American civil rights activist
- Sanford Levinson (born 1941), American legal scholar
- Sanford Lieberson (born 1936), American film producer
- Sanford N. McDonnell (1922–2012), American businessman
- Sanford Meisner (1905–1997), American actor and acting teacher
- Sanford K. Moats (1921–2023), American Air Force officer
- Sanford A. Moeller (1886–1960), American musician
- Sanford Alexander Moss (1872–1946), American aviation engineer
- Sanford Palay (1918–2002), American scientist and educator
- Sanford Panitch, American film executive
- Sanford Plummer (1905–1974), Native American painter
- Sanford Jacob Ramey (1798–1866), American politician
- Sanford Ransdell (1781–1854), American pioneer and soldier
- Sanford E. Reisenbach (1932–2015), American marketing executive
- Sanford Rosenthal (1897-1989), American scientist
- Sanford Ross (1907–1954), American painter and printmaker
- Sanford H. Roth (1906–1962), American photographer
- Sanford Schram (born 1949), American political scientist and author
- Sanford L. Segal (1937–2010), American mathematician
- Sanford C. Sigoloff (1930-2011), American businessman
- Sanford W. Smith (1869–1929), American judge
- Sanford Socolow (1928–2015), American broadcast journalist
- Sanford L. Steelman, Jr. (born 1951), American judge
- Sanford Sylvan (1953–2019), American baritone
- Sanford E. Thompson (1867–1949), American engineer
- Sanford J. Ungar (born 1945), American journalist and author
- Sanford Wallace (born 1968), notorious American "Spam King"
- Sanford I. Weill (born 1933), American banker
- Sanford Wheeler (born 1970), first African-American Australian rules football player
- Sanford White (1888–1964), American football and baseball player
- Sanford Calvin Yoder (1879–1975), American Mennonite pastor and scholar
- Sanford Yung (1927–2013), Hong Kong accountant and politician
- Sanford Myron Zeller (1885–1948), American mycologist

== See also ==
- Sanford (disambiguation)
