= Kendig =

Kendig is a German surname. Notable people with the surname include:

- Bernard Kendig (c. 1813–1872), American slave trader
- Isabelle Kendig, American clinical psychologist
- Marjorie Kendig (1892–1981), American administrator
- W. Dennis Kendig (1880–1948), American politician
