= Sandy Bay =

Sandy Bay can refer to:

== Africa ==
- Sandy Bay, Cape Town, South Africa
- Sandy Bay, Saint Helena

== Asia ==
- Sandy Bay, Hong Kong, China
- Sandy Bay, Sandakan, Sabah, Malaysia

== Australia ==
- Sandy Bay, Tasmania, a suburb of Hobart, the capital city of Tasmania
- Sandy Bay Road, a major arterial road connecting Hobart's city centre with its southern suburbs
- 5–7 Sandy Bay Road, a heritage-listed former broadcast facility located in Hobart
- Sandy Bay Football Club, a defunct Australian rules football team that competed in the Tasmanian Football League from 1945 to 1997

== Europe ==
- Sandy Bay, Devon
- Sandy Bay, Gibraltar

== North America ==
- Sandy Bay First Nation, Manitoba, Canada
- Sandy Bay, Manitoba (Lake Winnipeg), Canada
- Sandy Bay, Newfoundland and Labrador, Canada
- Sandy Bay (Newfoundland and Labrador), Canada
- Sandy Bay, Saskatchewan, Canada

== Caribbean ==
- New Sandy Bay Village, Saint Vincent and the Grenadines
- Sandy Bay, Jamaica

== See also ==
- Sand Bay (disambiguation)
