= Dmitry Kokarev =

Dmitry Kokarev may refer to:

- Dmitry Kokarev (chess player) (born 1982), Russian chess Grandmaster
- Dmitrii Kokarev (swimmer) (born 1991), Russian swimmer

== See also ==
- Kokarev
