= Sandi =

Sandi may refer to:

== People ==
- Sandi (given name), a list of people and a fictional character
- Sandi, better known as Szandi, Hungarian singer Alexandra Pintácsi (born 1976)
- Sandi (surname), a list of people

== Places ==
- Sandi, Uttar Pradesh, town in Hardoi district, Uttar Pradesh, India
- Sandi, Raebareli, a village in Raebareli district, Uttar Pradesh, India
- Sandi, Jharkhand, village in Chitarpur, Ramgarh district, Jharkhand, India
- Sandi, Estonia, village in Rõuge Parish, Võru County, Estonia
- Nickname of San Diego, California, United States

== See also ==
- Sandy (disambiguation)
- Sandie (disambiguation)
- Sandhi
- Sandis
