= Stone House, West Virginia =

Stone House
- Unincorporated community
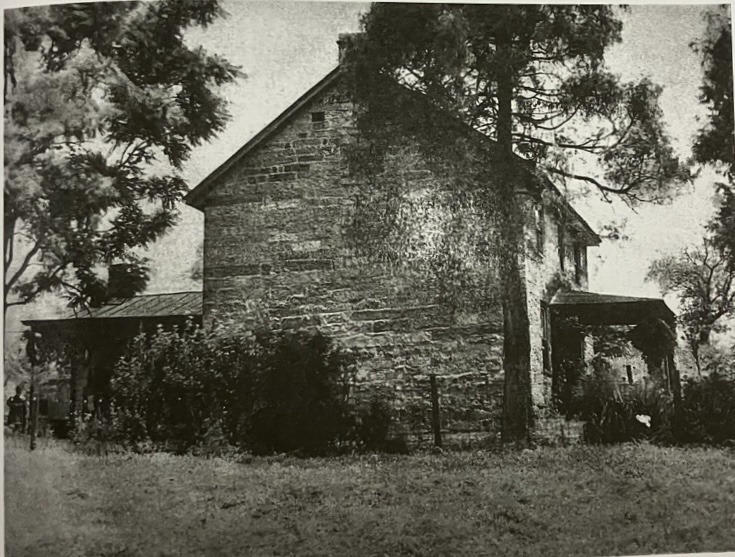
- The Stone House at Stone House (Photo, early 20th century)

- Location within the state of West Virginia Stone House (the United States)
- Coordinates: 39°16′35″N 80°0′42″W
- Country: United States
- State: West Virginia
- County: Taylor
- Elevation: 1,096 ft (334 m)
- Time zone: UTC-5 (Eastern (EST))
  - Summer (DST): UTC-4 (EDT)
- GNIS ID: 1689852

Stone House — or Stonehouse — is a former unincorporated community in Taylor County, West Virginia, USA. The site is now underwater in Tygart Lake, having been inundated after construction of the Tygart Dam (1934–38).

== History ==
The first white settler on the Tygart Valley River in the region now known as southern Taylor County was a man from Pennsylvania named David McDaniel (ca. 1768 – ca. 1850). He came in 1790, set up in a bottom land at the mouth of Flag Run and established a ferry that was known as “McDaniel’s Ferry” for the next century or so. It was "the most important [ferry] below Philippi". Two or three decades after his arrival, the McDaniel family built a large and imposing stone house there and it became such a local landmark that the community became known as “Stone House”. The McDaniels used this structure as a residence for at least three generations. The ferry business and a general store were run out of the house. In 1882, a narrow gauge railroad (the Grafton and Greenbrier line) was laid through the Valley from Grafton to Philippi and cut through the village. In 1884, a post office was established at the stone house, but by that time a man named Howard H. Arnold (1847-1915) owned it and lived there. Despite the fact that the community was still called Stone House, the post office was named the “Arnold Post Office”. In 1885, another post office was established at the neighboring community of Cecil, about a mile and a half upstream (and up the line) on Frog Run. In 1886, the Arnold PO was disestablished and all mail went to Cecil PO. The name of Stone House survived this brief attempt at renaming. The railroad stop there was always called Stone House, and it remained that afterwards.

With the construction between 1934 and ‘38 of the Tygart Dam three miles downstream, Stone House and a handful of other villages were doomed. The Tygart Lake waters slowly rose and inundated the communities. The federal government proposed to exhume all those interred in McDaniel Cemetery near Stone House (39 graves) and in Dadisman Cemetery between Stone House and Cecil (11 graves). Both cemeteries were found to be overgrown and neglected; graves had been marked with crude flagstones and most inscriptions had been obliterated by weathering. In the end, only four McDaniel and seven Dadisman graves could be identified by names. Living descendants were notified and named as defendants in a case in the Northern District Court out of Elkins presided over by Judge William E. Baker. There was no difficulty in the government securing title to the two cemetery tracts through condemnations. The 50 bodies were relocated to Mary’s Chapel Cemetery just across the boundary in Barbour County, with the unidentified ones going into a common vault.

== See also ==
- List of ghost towns in West Virginia
