= Sandipan =

Sandipan is a masculine Indian name. It may refer to:

- Sandipan Chattopadhyay, Bengali writer.
- Sandipan Kabir Chowdhury, future icon of Bangladesh.
- Sandipan Chanda, chess grandmaster.
- Sandipan Das, Indian cricketer.
- Sandipan Thorat, Indian politician.
- Sandipani, Hindu guru.

== See also ==
- Sandy (given name)
