= Elwood Murray =

American scientist

Elwood Murray (1897–1988) was an American administrator and scientist in the field of speech communications and general semantics.

== Biography ==
Elwood Murray was born in 1897 and raised on a farm near Hastings, Nebraska. He obtained a B.A. degree in 1922 from Hastings College, with majors in English and American History and received his M.A. in 1924 in Education and Speech at the University of Iowa and Ph.D. in Speech and Psychology from the University of Iowa in 1931.

In 1931 Murray began teaching speech at the University of Denver. From 1932 until his retirement in 1962 he directed the School of Speech at the university.

In 1949 he initiated the founding of the National Society for the Study of Communication, and served as its president in 1953. End 1950s he was among the first members of the Society for General Systems Research. He served as director of the Institute of General Semantics from 1967 to 1969.

== Work ==
Murray participated in numerous conferences, presenting papers on general semantics and communications theory. In 1939 he participated in the first of his five seminars with Alfred Korzybski in Chicago. Jointly with Marjorie Kendig he programmed the 1942 and 1950 congresses in general semantics held at the University of Denver.

In 1952 Murray wrote Integrative Speech, which was one of the first textbooks to introduce general semantics in the teaching of communication.

Later according to Brownell (1979), "Murray founded the Interdisciplinary Analogue Laboratory which was designed to identify analogous structures occurring in different fields of education. These basic structures could then serve as foundations of an integrated curriculum where students would be encouraged to view their subjects of study relationally".

== Publications ==
- 1937, The Speech Personality. Lippincott.
- 1952, Integrative Speech Dryden Press.
- 1969, Speech: Science-Art. Bobbs-Merrill.
