= Collins Beach (Sauvie Island) =

Beach in Oregon, United States

- Beach
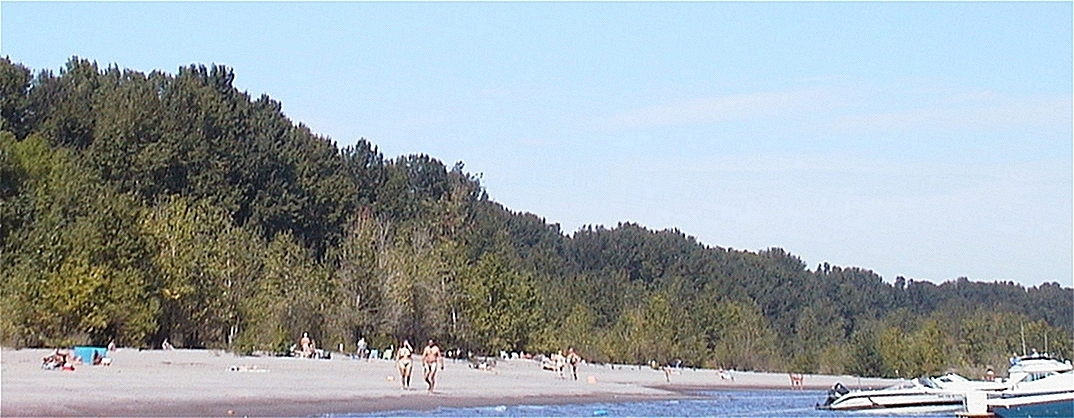
- Collins Beach

- Location within Oregon
- Coordinates: 45.793°N 122.789°W
- Location: Sauvie Island, Oregon, United States
- Water bodies: Columbia River
- Operator: Oregon Department of Fish and Wildlife

Dimensions
  - Length: 1 m (3 ft 3 in)

Collins Beach is a sandy beach on the Columbia River side of Sauvie Island in Oregon, United States, located north of Portland.

Part of it is a clothing-optional area. The beach is one mile (1.6 km) long and begins about 0.25 miles (400 m) after Reeder Road becomes gravel. Hours are 4:00 a.m. to 10:00 p.m. every day.

The beach has been popular for nude use since at least the 1970s. It is surrounded by a 12,000-acre (49 km^{2}) fish and game reserve, except for a 10-acre (4.0 ha) parcel of privately owned land west of Reeder Road at the north boundary of Collins Beach. Nude beach users continue onto the non-nude North Unit Beach which is poorly delineated and ineffectively screened from view, which has led to a legal complaint by the property owners.

Collins Beach is one of two official clothing-optional beaches in Oregon after Glass Bar Island's in Eugene, Oregon closed. The other is Rooster Rock State Park. It is administered by the Oregon Department of Fish and Wildlife in cooperation with the Columbia County Sheriff's Office.

== See also ==
- Nudity in Oregon
