= Sandy Island =

Sandy Island may refer to:

== Australia ==
- Sandy Island (Lacepede Islands), Western Australia
- Sandy Island (Windy Harbour), Western Australia

== Canada ==
- Sandy Island (Saskatchewan), Canada
- Sandy Island (British Columbia), in the List of islands of British Columbia
  - Sandy Island Marine Provincial Park, British Columbia, Canada

== Other places ==
- Sandy Island (Anguilla), in the Caribbean
- Sandy Island (Pitcairn Islands), in the Oeno Island atoll
- Sandy Island, South Carolina, United States, an unincorporated community and a larger island
- Sandy Island (Andaman and Nicobar Islands), Andaman and Nicobar Islands, India
- Düne, Heligoland, known in English as Sandy Island in the 19th century

== Other uses ==
- Sandy Island, New Caledonia, a phantom island

== See also ==
- Sandy Island and Low Rock Important Bird Area, Northern Territory, Australia
- Sandy Island Beach State Park, New York, United States
- Sandy Cay, an uninhabited island in the British Virgin Islands
- Sand Island (disambiguation)
- Sandy Islands (disambiguation)
