= Sand Bay (disambiguation) =

Sand Bay is a bay on the coast of Somerset in England.

Sand Bay may also refer to:

- Sand Bay, Ontario, a community in Canada on Lake Superior
- Sand Bay, Wisconsin, a community in the United States on Lake Superior

== See also ==
- Sandy Bay (disambiguation)
