= Nudity in Oregon =

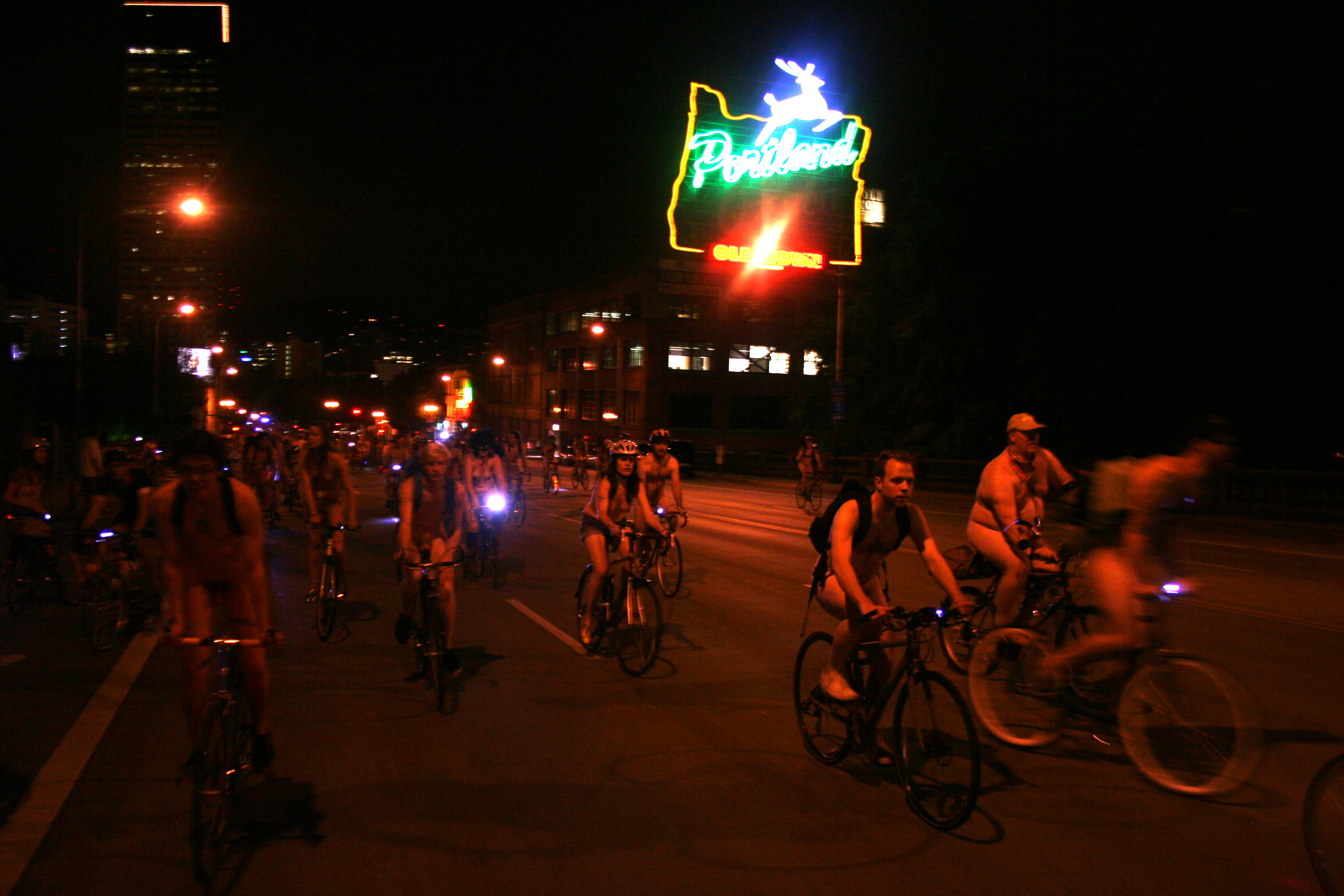
Portland World Naked Bike Ride, 2012

According to The Oregonian, "Oregon state law is actually pretty lenient on nudity." There are laws about behavior while nude. The Portland World Naked Bike Ride is the world's largest iteration of the World Naked Bike Ride.

Signs at Rooster Rock State Park, 2015

Sites allowing nude recreation include: Collins Beach on Sauvie Island, Mountaindale Sun Resort, Rooster Rock State Park, and Squaw Mountain Ranch. Clothing is optional at Breitenbush Hot Springs Retreat & Conference Center.

In 2010, Ashland's city council banned public nudity.
