= Yates, West Virginia =

Yates
- Unincorporated community
- Location within the state of West Virginia Yates (the United States)
- Coordinates: 39°17′43″N 80°1′27″W
- Country: United States
- State: West Virginia
- County: Taylor
- Elevation: 1,001 ft (305 m)
- Time zone: UTC-5 (Eastern (EST))
  - Summer (DST): UTC-4 (EDT)
- GNIS ID: 1689875

Yates is a former unincorporated community in Taylor County, West Virginia. The site is now underwater in Tygart Lake, having been inundated after construction of the Tygart Dam (1934–38).
