= Sandi (given name) =

Sandi is a unisex given name and occasionally a nickname. It can be a short form of Sandra, Alexander and other names. It may refer to:

== People ==
=== Women ===
- Sandi Bogle, 21st century English television personality born Sandy Channer
- Sandi Bowen (born 1976), Australian volleyball player
- Sandi Fellman (born 1952), American photographer
- Sandi Freeman, American journalist
- Sandi Goldsberry (born 1955), American high jumper
- Sandi Griffiths (born 1946), American singer best known as a performer on The Lawrence Welk Show
- Sandi A. Hohn (born 1952), Japanese singer
- Sandra "Sandi" Jackson (born 1963), American politician, daughter-in-law of Jesse Jackson
- Sandi Morris (born 1992), American pole vaulter
- Sandra "Sandi" Patty (born 1956), American Christian music singer
- Sandi Peterson (born 1959), American businesswoman
- Barbara Robison (1945–1988), American rock singer
- Sandra "Sandi" Sissel (born 1949), American cinematographer and director
- Sandi Sweitzer (born 1946), American former pairs figure skater
- Alexandria "Sandi" Thom (born 1981), Scottish singer, songwriter and musician
- Sandra "Sandi" Toksvig (born 1958), Danish-born English comedian, author and presenter on radio and television
- Sandi Vito, 21st century American politician

=== Men ===
- Sandi Čebular (born 1986), Slovenian basketball player
- Sandi Čeh (born 1983), Slovenian footballer
- Aleksandar "Sandi" Cenov (born 1968), Croatian pop singer
- Alexander "Sandi" Čolnik (1937–2017), Slovene journalist, television presenter and writer
- Sandi Simcha DuBowski (born 1970), American film director and producer
- Sandi Klavžar (born 1962), Slovenian mathematician
- Sandi Križman (born 1989), Croatian footballer
- Aleksander "Sandi" Lah, Slovenian football player in the 1930s
- Sandi Lovrić (born 1998), Slovenian footballer
- Sandi Ogrinec (born 1998), Slovenian footballer
- Sandi Papež (born 1965), Yugoslav cyclist
- Sandi Sejdinovski, Slovenian football coach
- Sandi Darma Sute (born 1992), Indonesian footballer
- Alexander "Sandy" Thom (1894–1985), Scottish engineer
- Sandi Valentinčič (born 1967), Slovenian football player

== Fictional characters ==
- Sandi Brandenberg, Marvel Comics character
- Sandi Griffin, character in Daria

== See also ==
- Sandy (given name)
