= East Sand Island =

Island in Oregon

- Location within Oregon

Geography
- Location: Columbia River
- Coordinates: 46.262°N 123.98°W

Administration
- United States
- State: Oregon
- County: Clatsop

East Sand Island is a dredge spoil island in the Columbia River estuary near Astoria, Oregon. Originally a small sandbar, it was built up over decades with river dredge sand to its current size of about 60 acres.

The island has been home to some of the largest colonies of nesting seabirds in the Pacific Northwest. It has also been a site of controversy over how to manage these birds and their predation of salmon and steelhead, among other issues.

== History ==
For most of its history, East Sand Island was a small and shifting sandbar near larger Sand Island in the coastal estuary of the Columbia River. Starting in the 1940s, the Army Corps of Engineers greatly increased the size of the island by dumping sand from the dredging of the river to allow transport of large container ships.

Although it is closer to the Washington side of the river, the island is part of the state of Oregon, and is owned and managed by the Army Corps of Engineers.

== Seabird Colonies ==
Caspian terns first nested on the island in 1984, but vegetation quickly grew over the colony site, and the birds relocated upriver to nearby Rice Island. As the Rice Island colony grew, data suggested that the terns were eating large numbers of juvenile salmon on their way downriver. By 2001, the Army Corps of Engineers and researchers successfully relocated the colony back to East Sand, in hopes that the original location, now cleared of vegetation, would give the terns a more varied diet, being closer to the Pacific Ocean. In 2008, the colony peaked at over 10,000 breeding pairs, the largest Caspian tern breeding colony in the world.

Wildlife managers planned to relocate the terns again, from East Sand to seven smaller colony sites along the Pacific coast. But the alternative sites never reached their projected sizes, and the East Sand colony began to experience regular complete colony failure, leading to no fledgling terns in most of the seasons between 2016 and 2023. In 2023, the East Sand colony included 524 breeding pairs, a reduction of 95% from its peak.

Double-crested cormorants were first seen nesting on the island in 1989, with a total of 90 confirmed nests. By 2010, the colony had grown to over 13,000 pairs, making it the largest colony of the species in North America.

In 2015, the Army Corps began a plan to harass cormorants away from the island by both shooting adult birds and destroying nest sites. In 2016, the colony was abandoned, and has not recovered. Most of those birds relocated on to the Astoria-Megler Bridge, where they became a hazard both to passing cars and the bridge itself. Their highly acidic guano caused $1 million in damage to the bridge each year. Citing this damage and high estimates of salmon and steelhead predation, the Army Corps decided to reverse their previous action and try to return the cormorants to East Sand. This re-relocation plan is estimated to cost at least $18 million over four years.

Other birds that have nested or roosted in large numbers on the island include brown pelicans, and ring-billed, glaucous-winged and western gulls.

The island is recognized as an Important Bird Area by BirdLife International.
