= Rooster Rock State Park =

State park in Oregon, United States

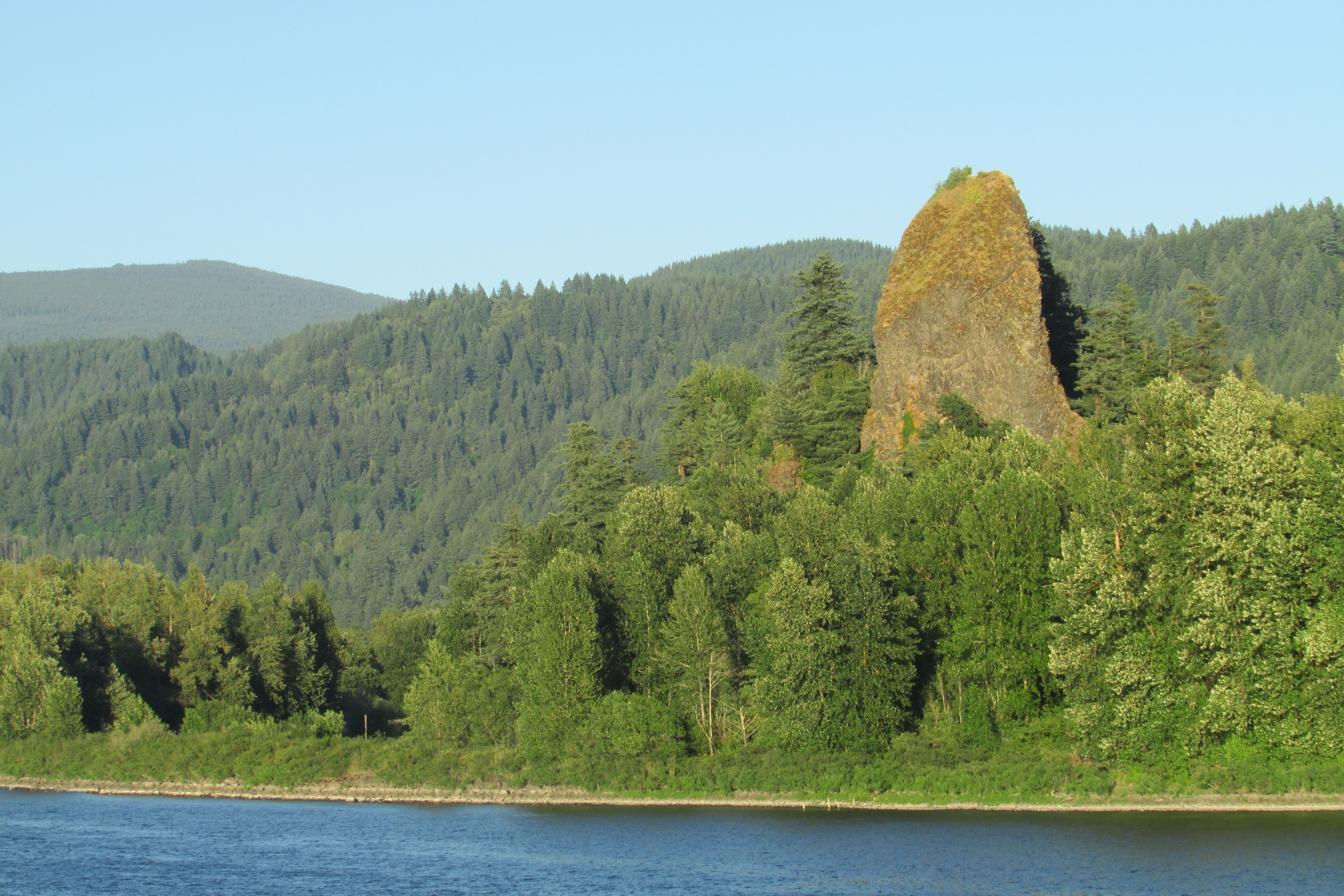
- Rooster rock from the west

- Location within Oregon Location within the United States
- Type: Public, state
- Location: Multnomah County, Oregon
- Nearest city: Troutdale
- Coordinates: 45°32′40″N 122°14′09″W
- Operator: Oregon Parks and Recreation Department

Rooster Rock State Park is a state park located east of Corbett, in the U.S. state of Oregon. One of the features of the park is Rooster Rock, a column of basalt forming a natural obelisk, which stands near the south side of the Columbia River Gorge, in the lee of Crown Point. The park is administered by the Oregon Parks and Recreation Department.

The monolith was mentioned in the journal of the explorers Lewis and Clark as their camping place on November 2, 1805. The name is phallic in origin, specifically, the column's original name was "Cock Rock". The Chinook word for the rock was iwash, referring to penis. The name was later modified, at the urging of Dalles businessperson Victor Trevitt, to Rooster Rock so as not to offend the public.

The eastern portion of the park is designated as a clothing-optional beach, the first officially designated clothing-optional beach in the U.S. The only other clothing-optional beach in the state, after Glassbar Island's closing, is Collins Beach, on Sauvie Island in the Columbia River, north of Portland.

The area around the parking lot has been a favorite astronomy spot for amateur astronomers in the area, with organizations such as OMSI hosting multiple star parties at the venue.

== Gallery ==
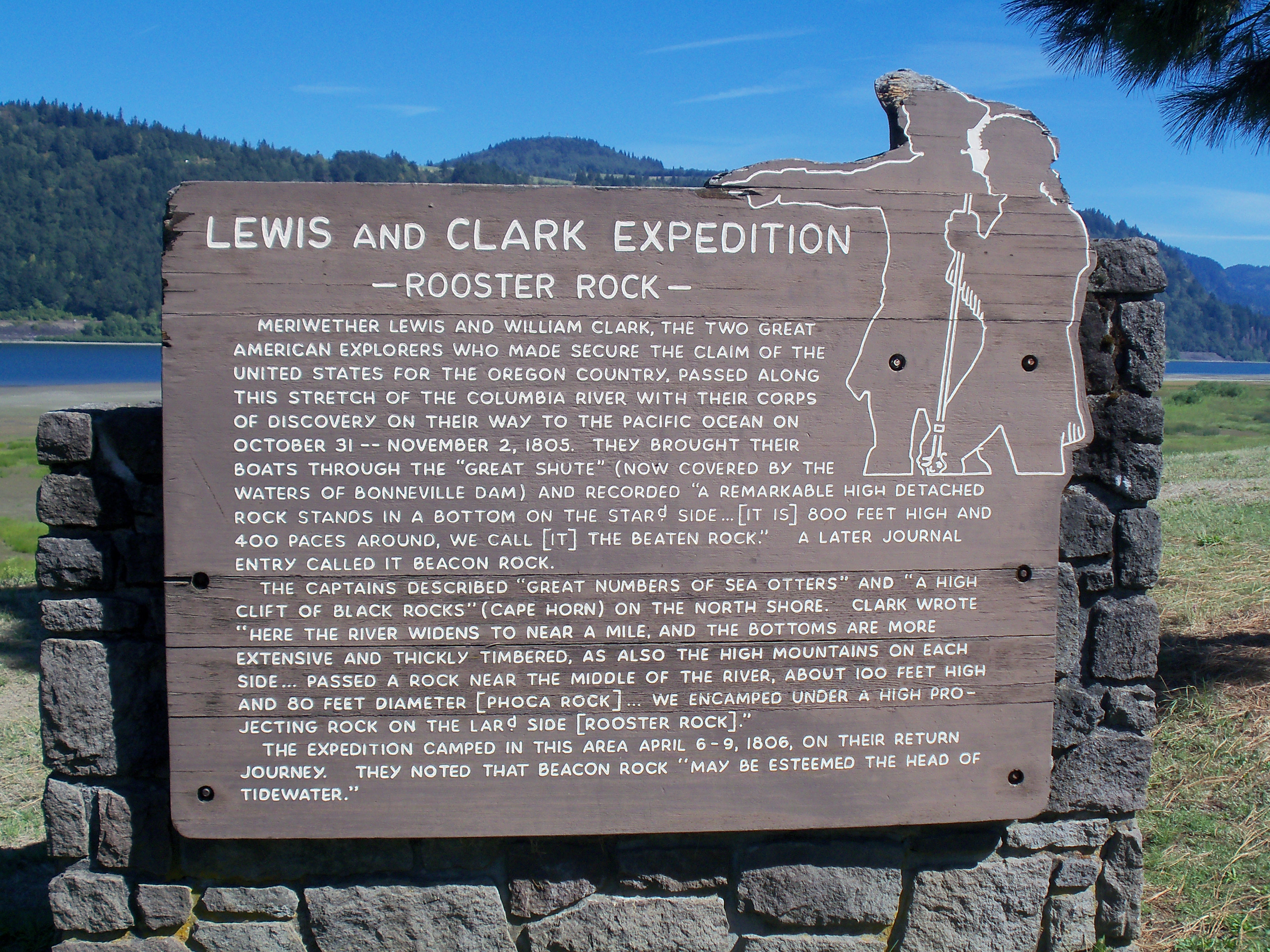
Rooster Rock sign

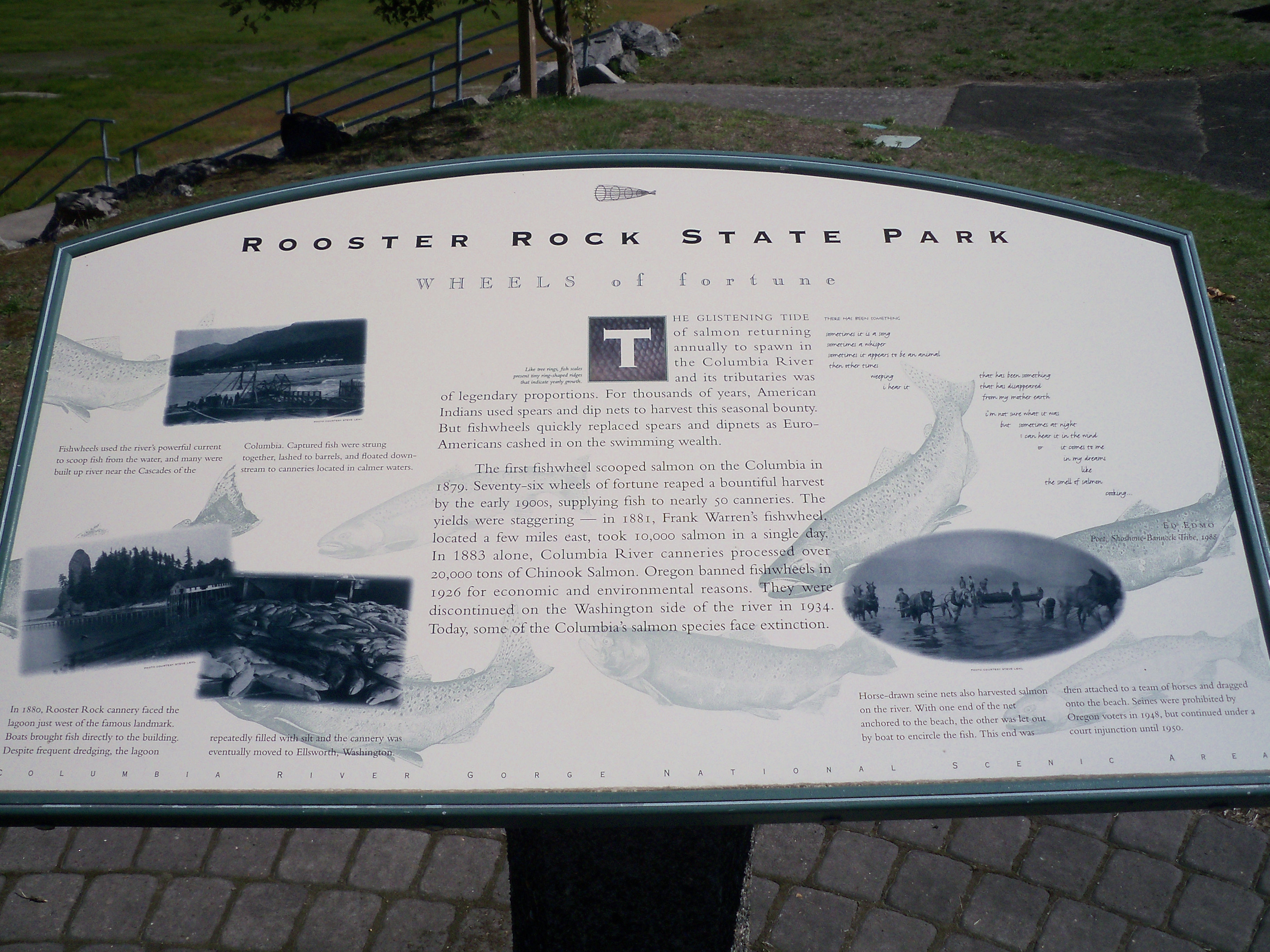
Rooster Rock plaque

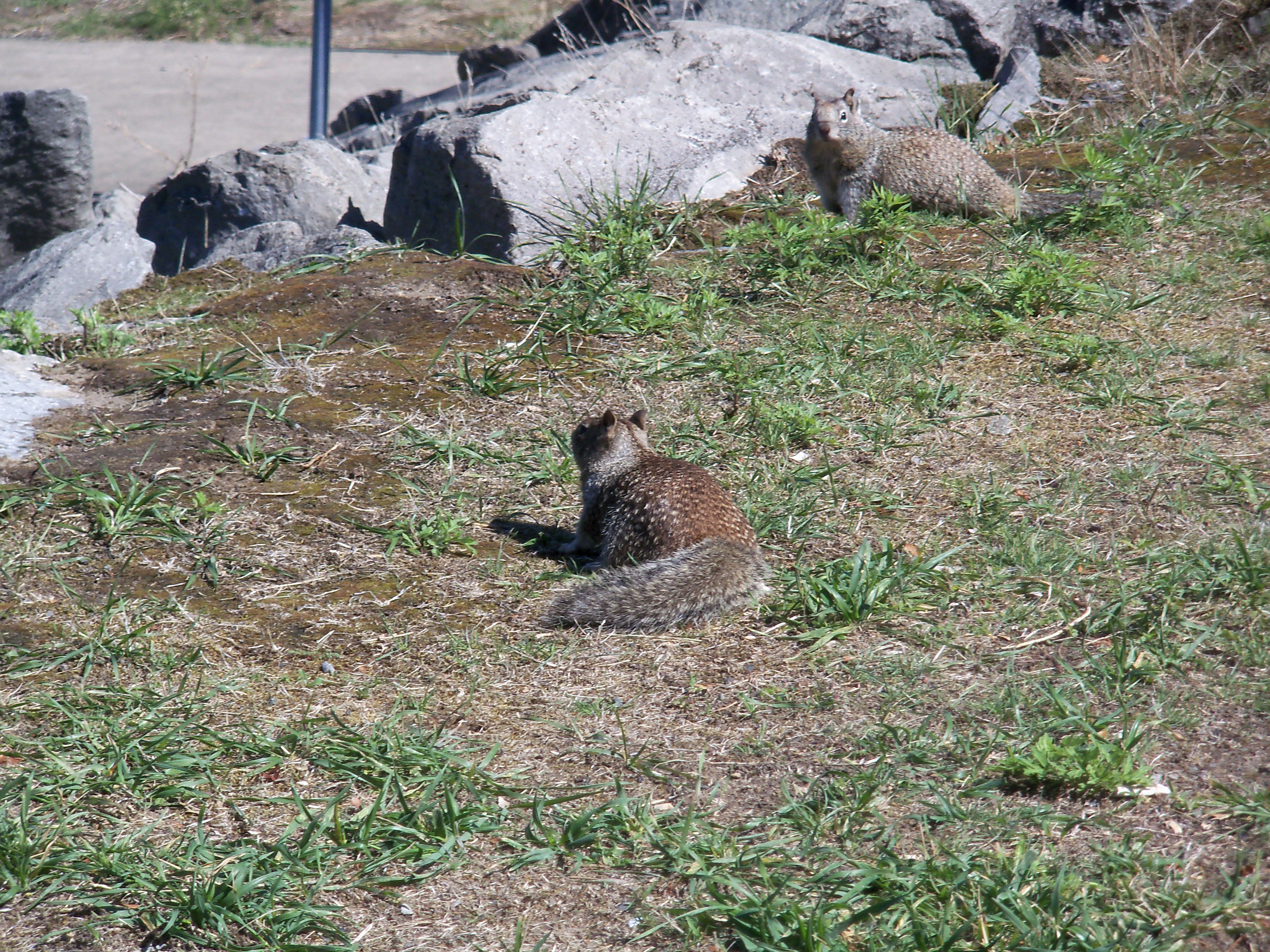
Squirrels at Rooster Rock State Park

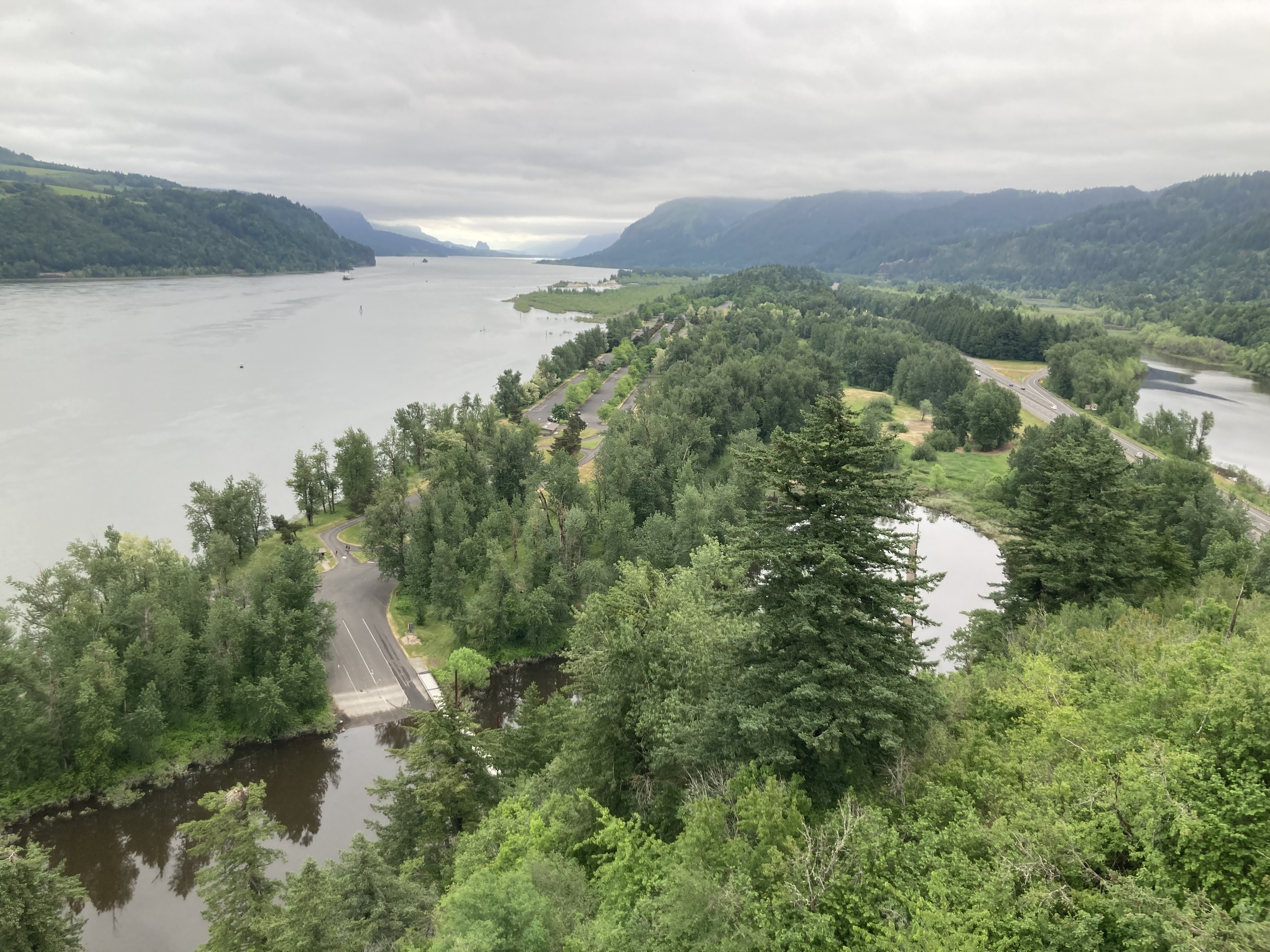
Rooster Rock State Park from top of Rooster Rock

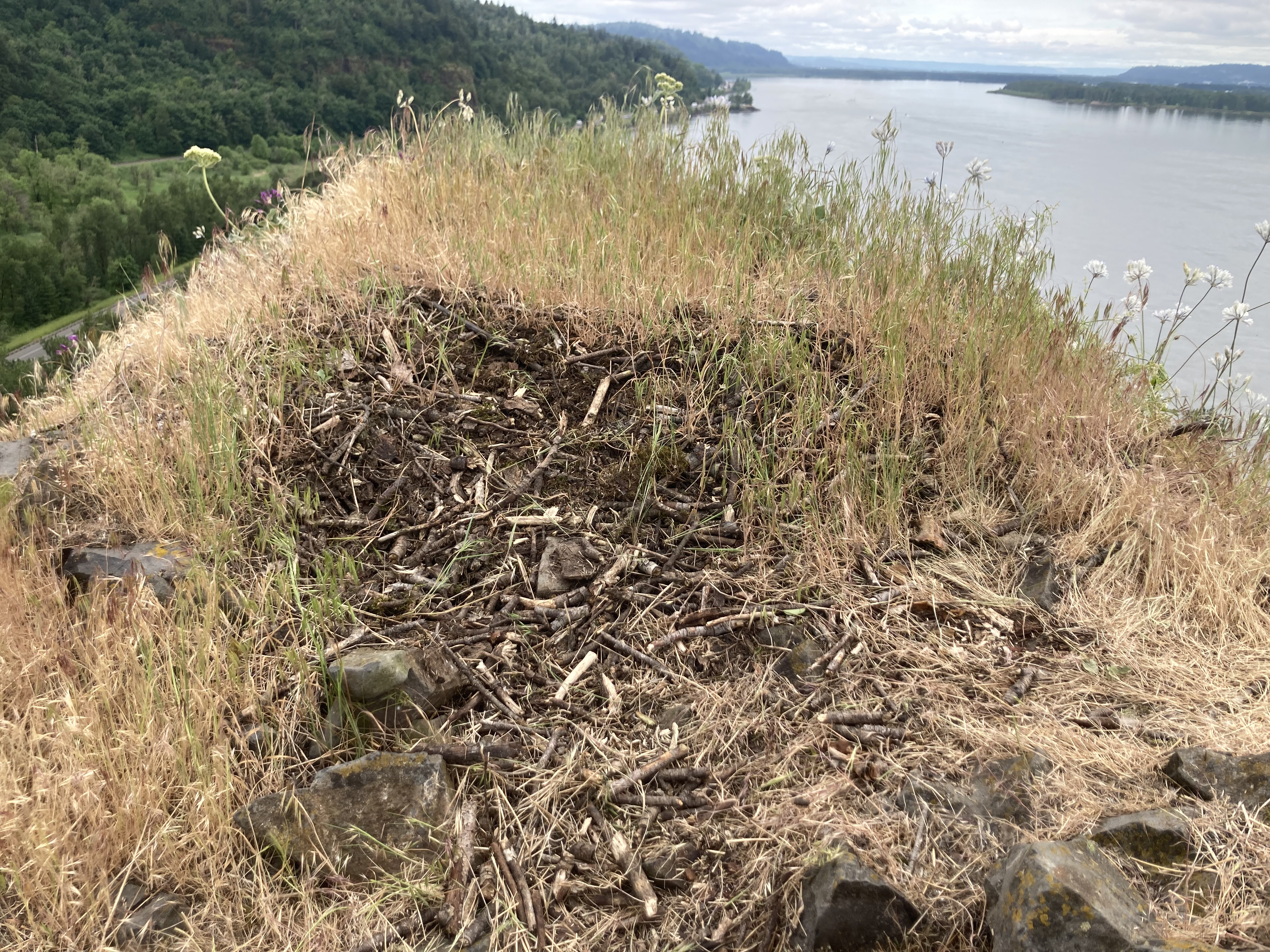
Abandoned osprey nest at the top of Rooster Rock

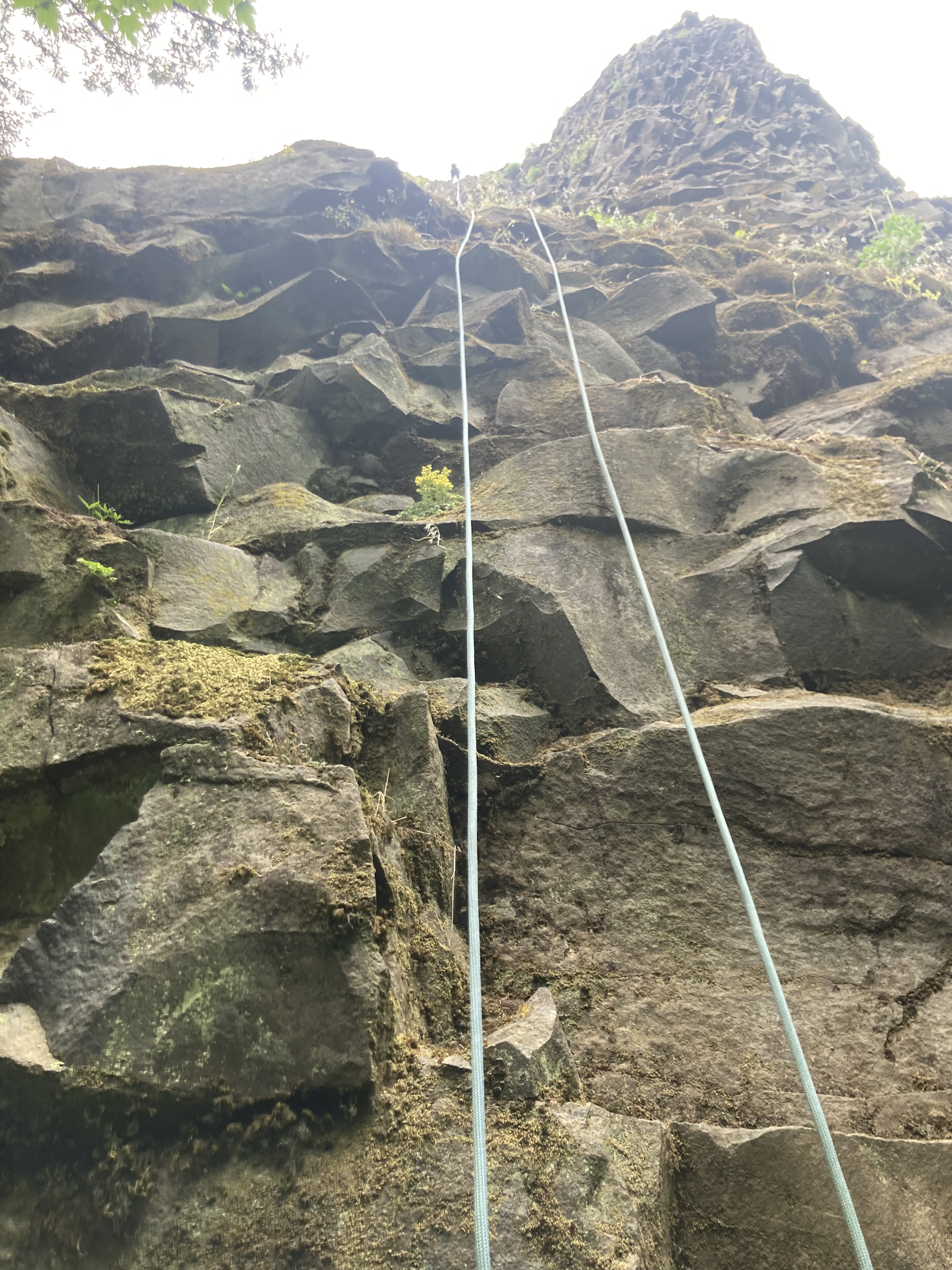
A climber starts to rappel down Rooster Rock

== See also ==
- List of places where social nudity is practised
- Naturism
- Nudity in Oregon
- Sand Island (Multnomah County, Oregon)
