= Kokarev =

Kokarev may refer to:

- Denis Kokarev (born 1985), Russian ice hockey player
- Dmitrii Kokarev (swimmer) (born 1991), Russian swimmer
- Dmitry Kokarev (chess player) (born 1982), Russian chess grandmaster
- Nikita Kokarev (born 2003), Russian footballer
- Oleg Kokarev (born 1963), Russian footballer and coach

== See also ==
- Aleksandrs Kokarevs (born 1955), former Latvian football player and manager
