= Tygart Dam =

- Tygart River Reservoir Dam
- U.S. National Register of Historic Places
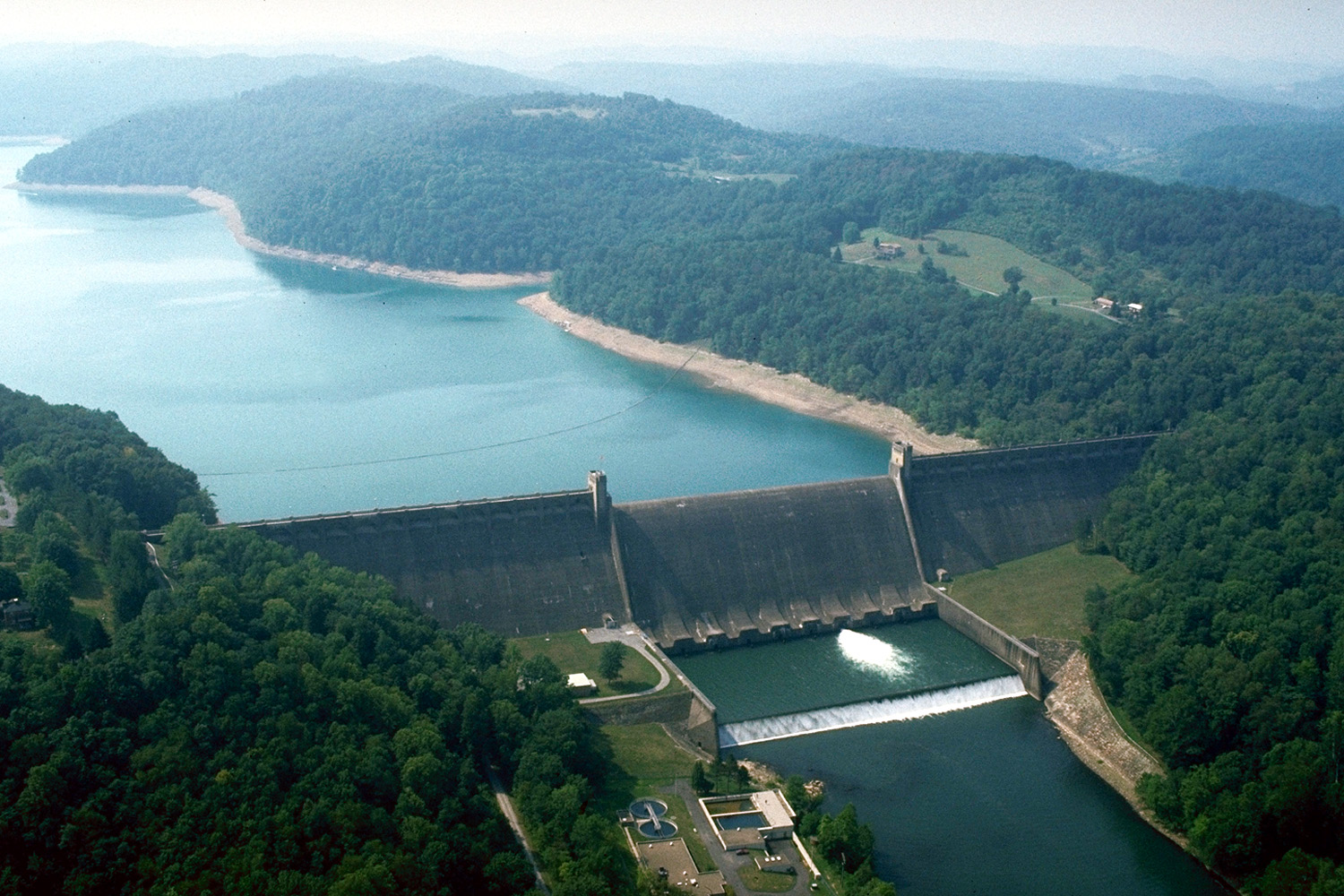
- Tygart Lake and Dam, October 1995

- Location within West Virginia Location within the United States
- Location: Taylor County, West Virginia, US
- Coordinates: 39°18′46″N 80°02′02″W
- Area: 143.2 acres (58.0 ha)
- Built: 1934
- Architect: Paul Philippe Cret
- Architectural style: Art Deco
- NRHP reference No.: 95000763
- Added to NRHP: June 23, 1995

Tygart Dam — also known as Tygart River Dam — is a gravity dam built (1934-38) and operated by the United States Army Corps of Engineers in Taylor County, West Virginia, United States. The dam regulates the waters of the Tygart Valley River. Its storage reservoir is known as Tygart Lake. Most of the lakeshore is occupied by Tygart Lake State Park and Pleasant Creek Wildlife Management Area. The structure was listed on the National Register of Historic Places in 1995.

== History ==
Tygart Dam and Lake were authorized by the Rivers and Harbors Act of 1935; they represented the first of 16 flood control projects in the Pittsburgh District of the United States Army Corps of Engineers. The Dam was designed in part by architect Paul Philippe Cret and built between 1934 and '38, as a project sponsored by the Public Works Administration to provide for flood control. Small communities — such as Yates, Cecil, Sandy, Cove Run, and Stone House — were partially or fully evacuated at the time of the dam construction. The intent of the project was to provide flood protection for the Tygart River Valley as well as for the Monongahela and upper Ohio Rivers. Construction costs totaled $18.5 million.

== Description ==
=== The dam ===
Tygart Dam is about 2.5 mi (4.0 km) south of Grafton. It is owned and operated by the U.S. Army Corps of Engineers. The concrete gravity dam has an uncontrolled spillway and measures 1,921 ft (586 m) long and 209 ft (64 m) thick at the base. The structure features some Art Deco style decorative elements. Located within the historic area are the Tygart Dam; two dam tender dwellings; two maintenance buildings; comfort, storage and concession building; overlook and parking area; and resource manager's office.

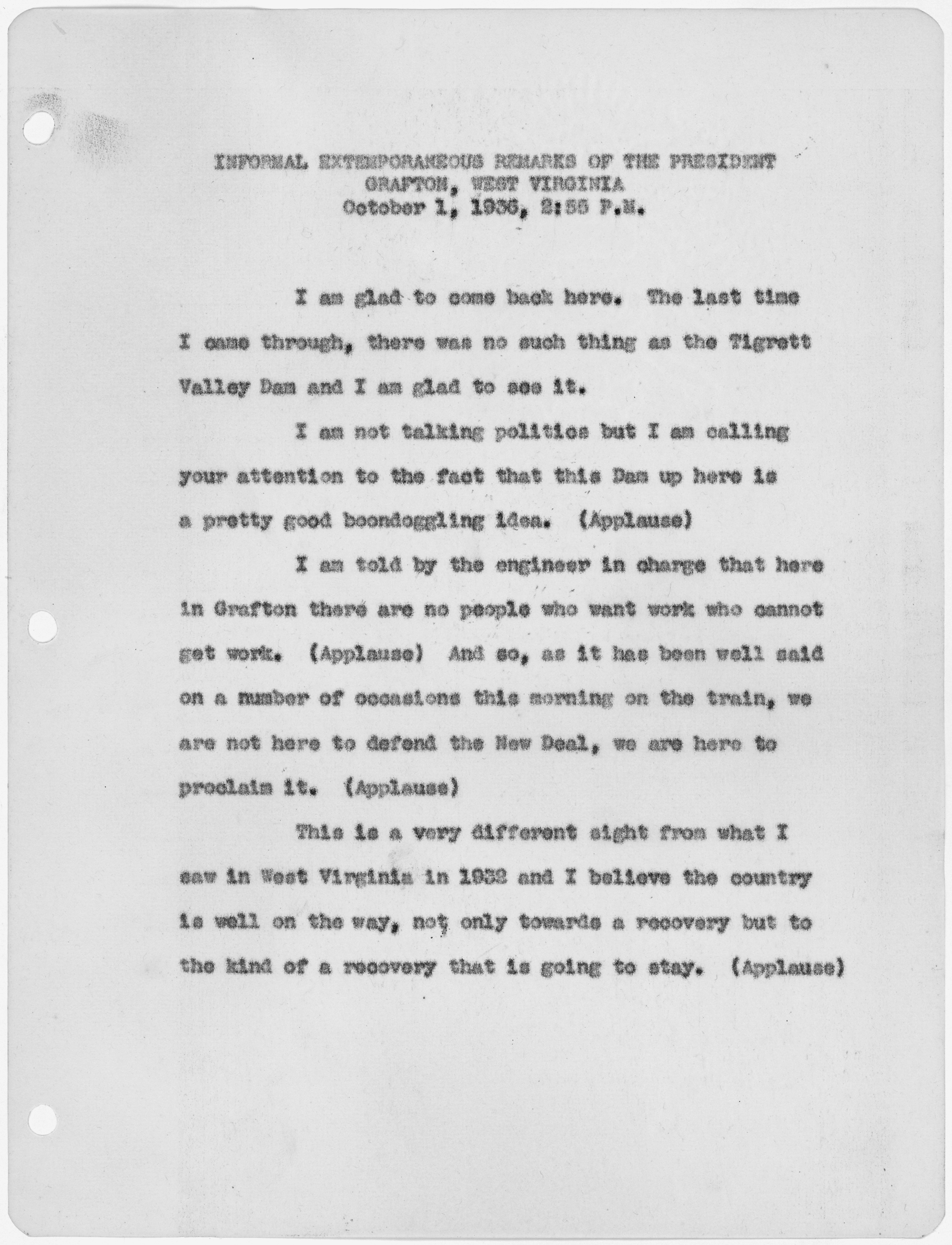
Remarks by FDR on 1936 visit to the project

=== The lake ===
Tygart Lake is situated in the south-central part of Taylor County, although the southern end of the reservoir reaches into northern Barbour County. It has the capability to store the equivalent run-off of 4.56 inches of precipitation from the Lake's 1,184 square mile drainage area. The project's flood control benefits were demonstrated most notably during the November 1985 floods when it prevented an estimated $195.8 million in damages and lowered flood crests along the Monongahela River by as much as 6.8 feet. Since its completion in 1938, Tygart Dam has prevented flood damages estimated by the Corps to be nearly $1.2 billion.

== Recreation ==
=== Fishing ===
Multiple West Virginia stage record fish were caught along the Tygart Lake.

== See also ==
- List of lakes of West Virginia
