= Sandis =

Male given name

- Gender: Male
- Name day: 4 July

Origin
- Origin: derived from Aleksandrs
- Region of origin: Latvian

Other names
- Related names: Aleksandrs, Sandris, Sandijs

Sandis is a Latvian masculine given name which may refer to:

- Sandis Buškevics (born 1977), Latvian basketball player
- Sandis Ģirģens (born 1980), Latvian politician
- Sandis Ozoliņš (born 1972), Latvian hockey player, formerly in the National Hockey League
- Sandis Prūsis (born 1965), Latvian bobsledder
- Sandis Smons (born 1999), Latvian ice hockey player
- Sandis Valters (born 1978), Latvian basketball player

== See also ==
- Sandys (surname)
- Sandi (disambiguation)
