= Institute of General Semantics =

American non-profit corporation

The Institute of General Semantics (IGS) is a not-for-profit corporation established in 1938 by Alfred Korzybski, to support research and publication on the topic of general semantics. The Institute publishes Korzybski's writings, including the seminal text Science & Sanity, and books by other authors who have studied or taught general semantics, such as Robert Pula, Irving J. Lee, Wendell Johnson, and Stuart Chase. Every year since 1952, it has sponsored the Alfred Korzybski Memorial Lecture, with presenters from a broad range of disciplines, from science to medicine to entertainment, including names like actor and writer Steve Allen, psychologist Albert Ellis, scientist and visionary R. Buckminster Fuller, linguist Allen Walker Read, and philosopher F. S. C. Northrop. The Institute offers periodic seminars, workshops and conferences and is headquartered in New York City.

== See also ==
- 1938 in philosophy
- General Semantics
- Marjorie Kendig
- Robert Pula
- Elwood Murray
- Sanford I. Berman
