= Cecil, West Virginia =

Unincorporated community in West Virginia, United States

Cecil
- Unincorporated community
- Location within the state of West Virginia Cecil (the United States)
- Coordinates: 39°16′17″N 79°59′14″W
- Country: United States
- State: West Virginia
- County: Taylor
- Elevation: 1,158 ft (353 m)
- Time zone: UTC-5 (Eastern (EST))
  - Summer (DST): UTC-4 (EDT)
- GNIS ID: 1689884

Cecil — originally Cecil Station — is an unincorporated community in Taylor County, West Virginia, United States.

Cecil was named after Cecil Board in 1898 when the railroad was extended to that point. The settlement was partially evacuated — including the train station — in 1936-37 to accommodate the rising waters of Tygart Lake.
