= Sanford I. Berman =

American philanthropist and hypnotist (1924–2015)

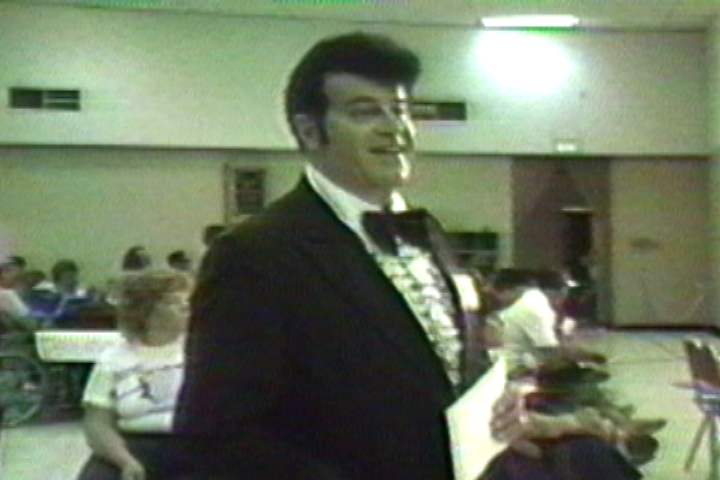
- Michael Dean performing in San Diego at Muscular Dystrophy Telethon
- Born: October 15, 1924; Virginia, Minnesota
- Died: June 16, 2015 (aged 90); Las Vegas, Nevada
- Occupations: Philanthropist, Real Estate Investor, Hypnotist

Dr. Sanford I. Berman (a.k.a. Dr. Michael Dean) was a philanthropist, real estate investor, professional hypnotist, and board member of the Institute of General Semantics. As of the year 2000, Berman had given more than a million dollars to the University of California, San Diego (UCSD); San Diego State University (SDSU); and University of Nevada, Las Vegas (UNLV). Berman endowed the Sanford I. Berman Institute for Effective Communication and General Semantics at SDSU in 1997, the Sanford I. Berman Chair in Language and Human Communication at UCSD in 1998, the Dr. Sanford I. Berman Professorship of Public Discourse and General Semantics at UNLV in 1999.

Books by Berman include Words, Meanings and People, The Closed Mind, How to Lessen Misunderstandings, and Why Do We Jump to Conclusions?. Berman acted as editor for Logic and General Semantics and with Irving Lee Language Habits in Human Affairs. He has also created over 100 audio tapes on motivation and general semantics.

== Biography ==
The son of a livestock broker, Sanford I. Berman was born October 15, 1924, in Virginia, Minnesota, a small town north of Duluth. He received his bachelor's degree in Radio and Communications from the University of Minnesota; a Master's in Speech from Teacher's College, Columbia University; and a doctorate in Speech Communications from Northwestern University, where he then assisted Dr. Irving J. Lee in his famous general-semantics classes. Berman has served as president of the International Society for General Semantics, and on the Board of Trustees of both the Society and the Institute of General Semantics. Dr. Berman died June 16, 2015.

== Stage hypnosis ==
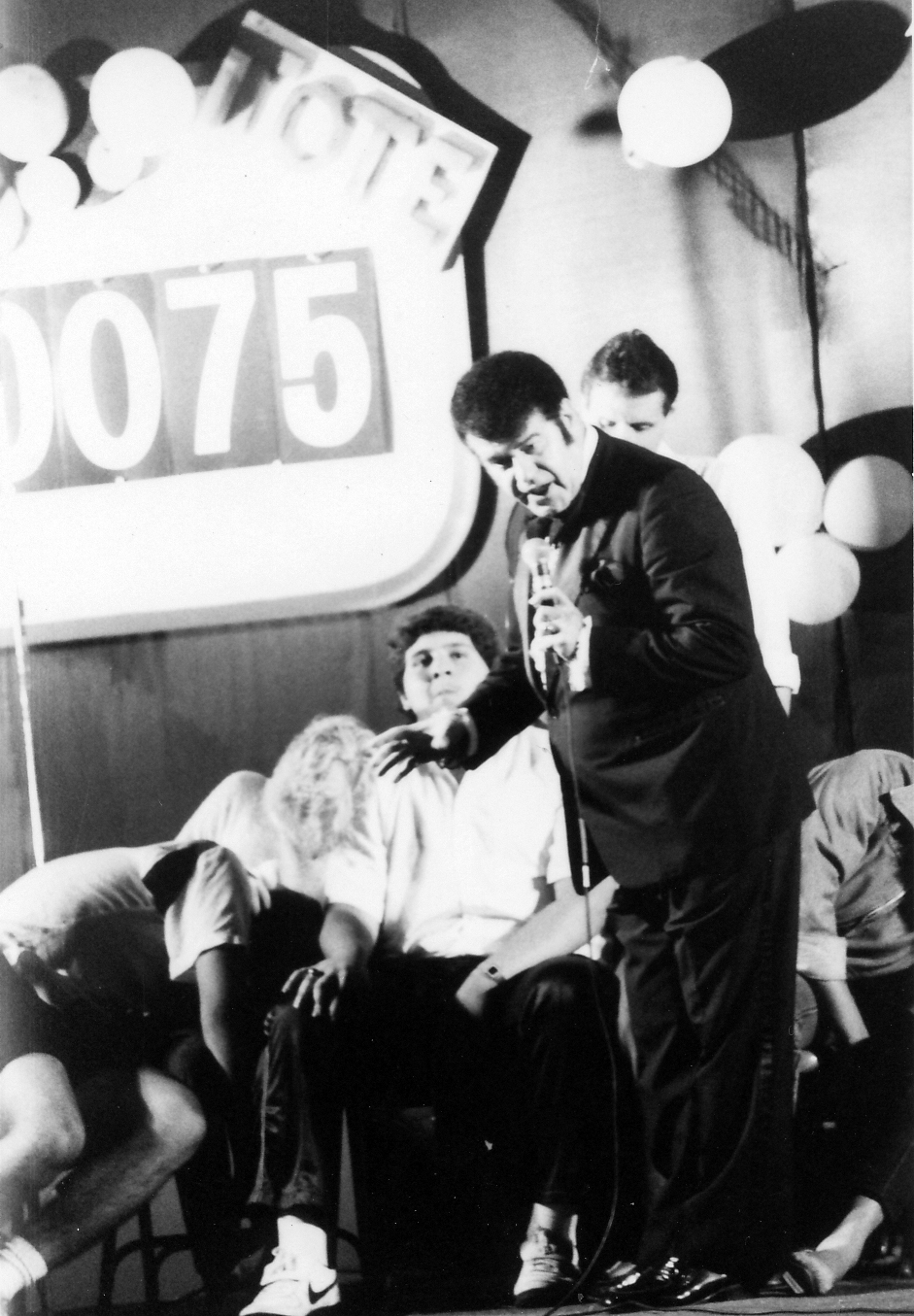
Dr. Michael Dean, Hypnotist, performs at a Telethon for Muscular Dystrophy, San Diego, 1984

Berman learned hypnosis during his days as a graduate student and became a night club hypnotist for over 30 years in San Diego and then Las Vegas. Berman also produced educational cassettes and LP vinyl records on how to practice self-hypnosis. In addition to making appearances on Hugh Hefner’s television show Playboy Penthouse and on Sunnup with Frank Herman, Berman hypnotized and advised Ken Norton, one of the few boxers to defeat Muhammad Ali.
