= Sandy Township =

Sandy Township may refer to:

- Sandy Township, St. Louis County, Minnesota
- Sandy Township, Stark County, Ohio
- Sandy Township, Tuscarawas County, Ohio
- Sandy Township, Pennsylvania
