= Marjorie Kendig =

Marjorie Kendig Gates
- Born: 1892
- Died: 1981 (aged 88–89)
- Scientific career
- Fields: General Semantics

Marjorie Mercer Kendig Gates (1892–1981), best known as M . Kendig, was an American administrator, director of the Institute of General Semantics from 1950 until 1965, and co-worker of Alfred Korzybski, who developed the theory of general semantics. She completed Korzybski's collected writings after his death in 1950.

== Career ==
Marjorie Kendig was one of the founders of the Institute of General Semantics in 1938 in Chicago. According to Read (1976), Kendig had "great ability as an administrator to organize, to plan, to budget, to assist in innumerable ways in launching it as the Educational Director, made it possible for Korzybski to carry out his work as lecturer and writer. He was able to give many seminars throughout the year at this new center for his work, and also wrote quite prolifically. Miss Kendig's efforts and know-how were crucial in establishing and developing the program of the Institute, and even more crucial in carrying it on after Korzybski's death in 1950."

As Education Director for the Institute of General Semantics from its inception in 1938, Kendig began publication of the General Semantics Bulletin in 1949. The Bulletin is considered the Institute's annual 'yearbook.' Jointly with Elwood Murray she programmed the 1942 and 1950 congresses in general semantics held at University of Denver. In the late 1950s she was among the first members of the Society for General Systems Research.

== Publications ==
- M. Kendig (Editor) (1990), Alfred Korzybski: Collected Writings, 1920-1950, Institute of General Semantics.

== Articles ==
- 1950. "Comments on The Mask of Sanity, Second Edition by Hervey Cleckley" in General Semantics Bulletin 4 & 5: 71
- 1952. "Caveat emptor, or watch your blood pressure!", with Marjorie Mercer in General Semantics Bulletin 10 & 11: 96.
- 1972. "About Books – Comments" in General Semantics Bulletin 37: 83
