= Sandie =

Sandie may refer to:

== People ==
- Sandie Clair (born 1988), French professional racing cyclist
- Sandie Fitzgibbon, Irish former camogie player
- Sandie Jones (1950/1951–2019), Irish singer
- Sandie Lindsay, 1st Baron Lindsay of Birker (1879-1952), British academic
- Sandie Pendleton (1840-1864), Confederate officer in the American Civil War
- Sandie Richards (born 1968), Jamaican track and field athlete
- Sandie Rinaldo (born 1950), Canadian television journalist and news anchor
- Sandie Shaw (born 1947), English pop singer
- Shelley Sandie (born 1969), Australian Olympic basketballer

== Arts and entertainment ==
- Sandie (album), by Sandie Shaw
- Sandie (comics), a British girls' comic
- Sandie Merrick, a character on the ITV soap opera Emmerdale Farm

== Other uses ==
- Sandie (cookie), a type of sugar or shortbread cookie, e.g. a pecan sandie
- Sandie River, Taiwan

== See also ==
- Sandy (disambiguation)
- Sandi (disambiguation)
