= Sand Island (Multnomah County, Oregon) =

Island in the Columbia River, U.S.

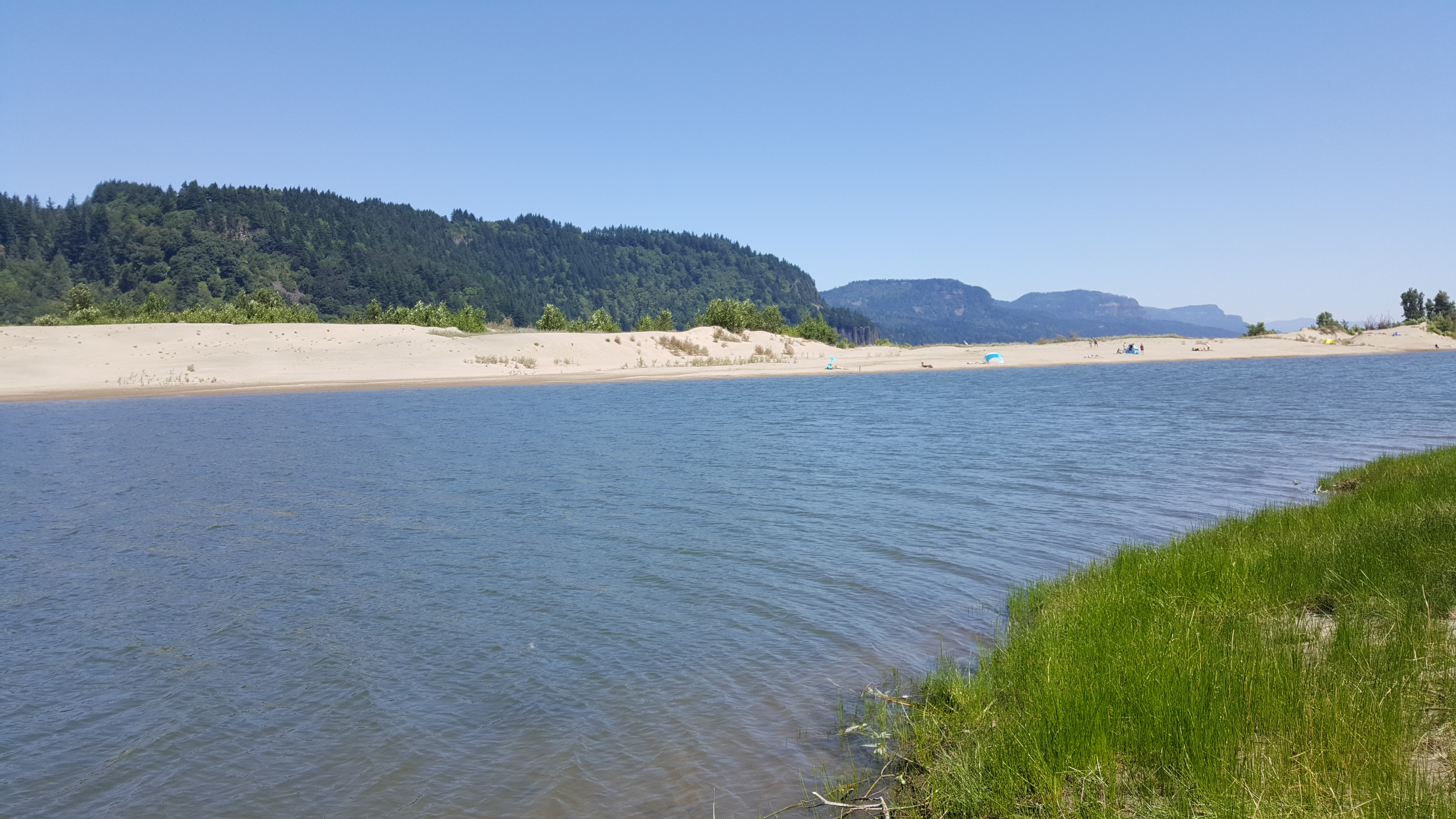
- View of Sand Island, 2019

- Location within Oregon

Geography
- Location: Columbia River
- Coordinates: 45.5534°N 122.2024°W

Administration
- United States
- State: Oregon

Sand Island is a dune-covered island in the Columbia River, and part of Rooster Rock State Park.

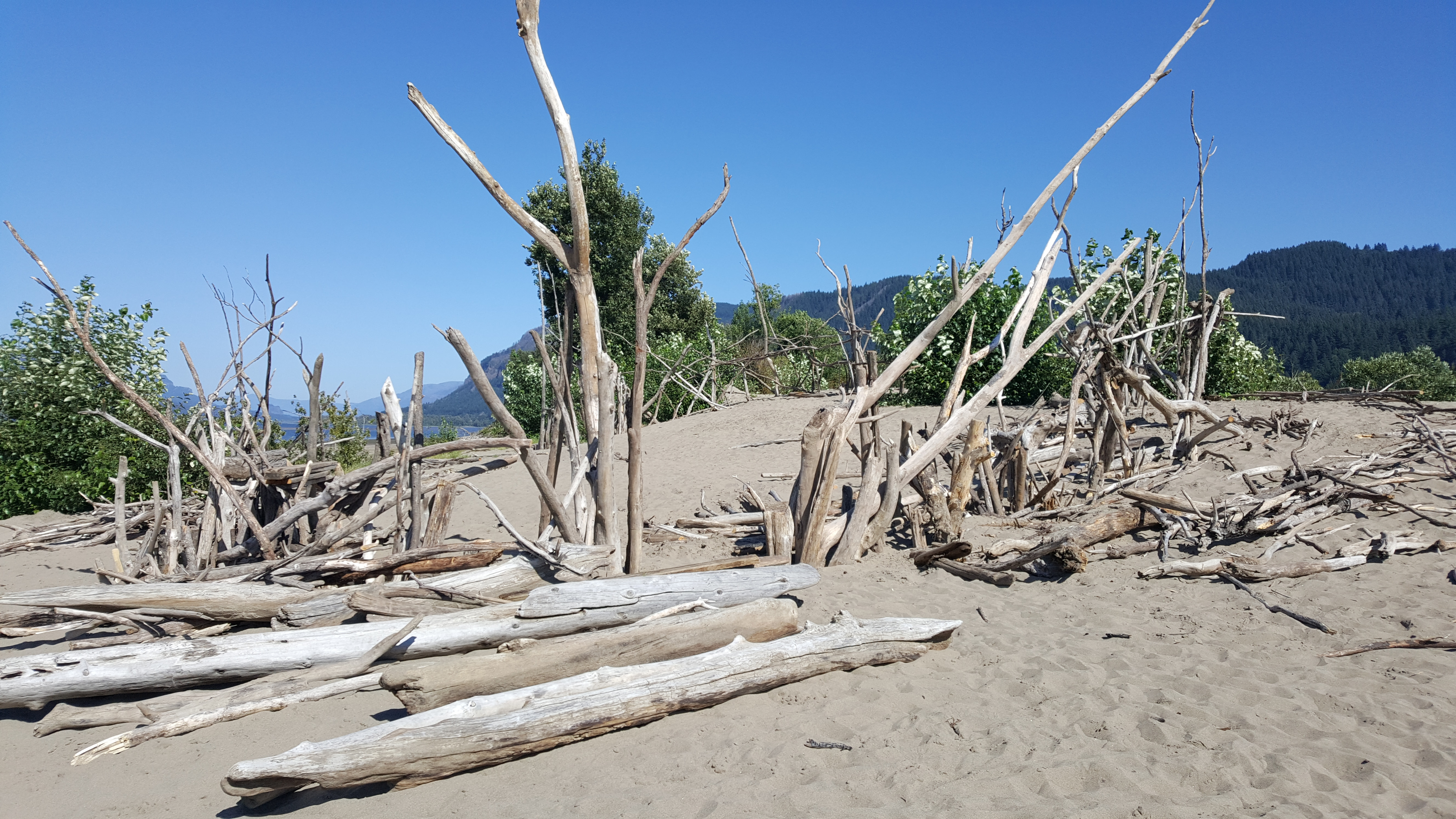
Wooden structure on the island

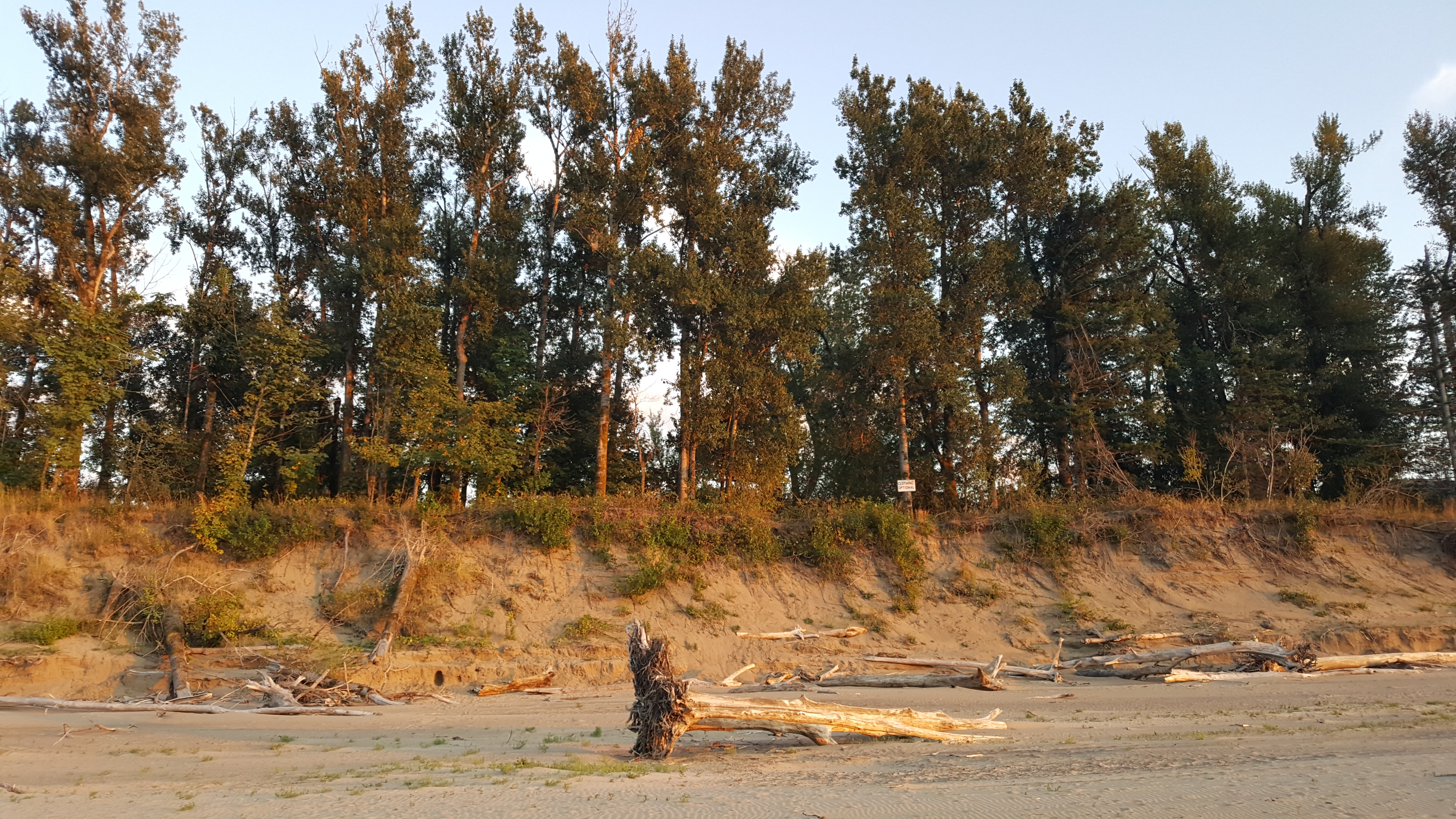
2019

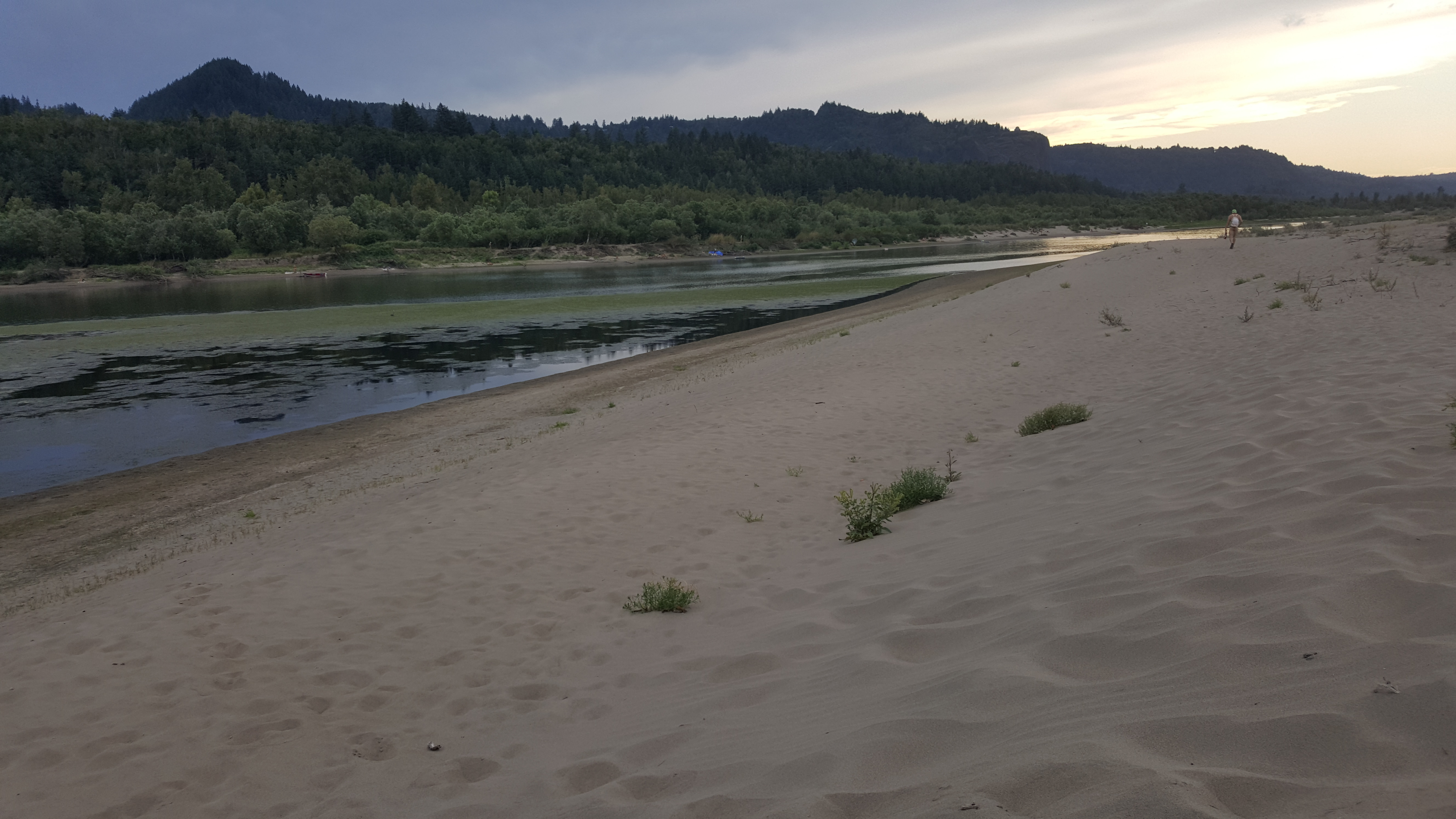
View of the mainland from the island

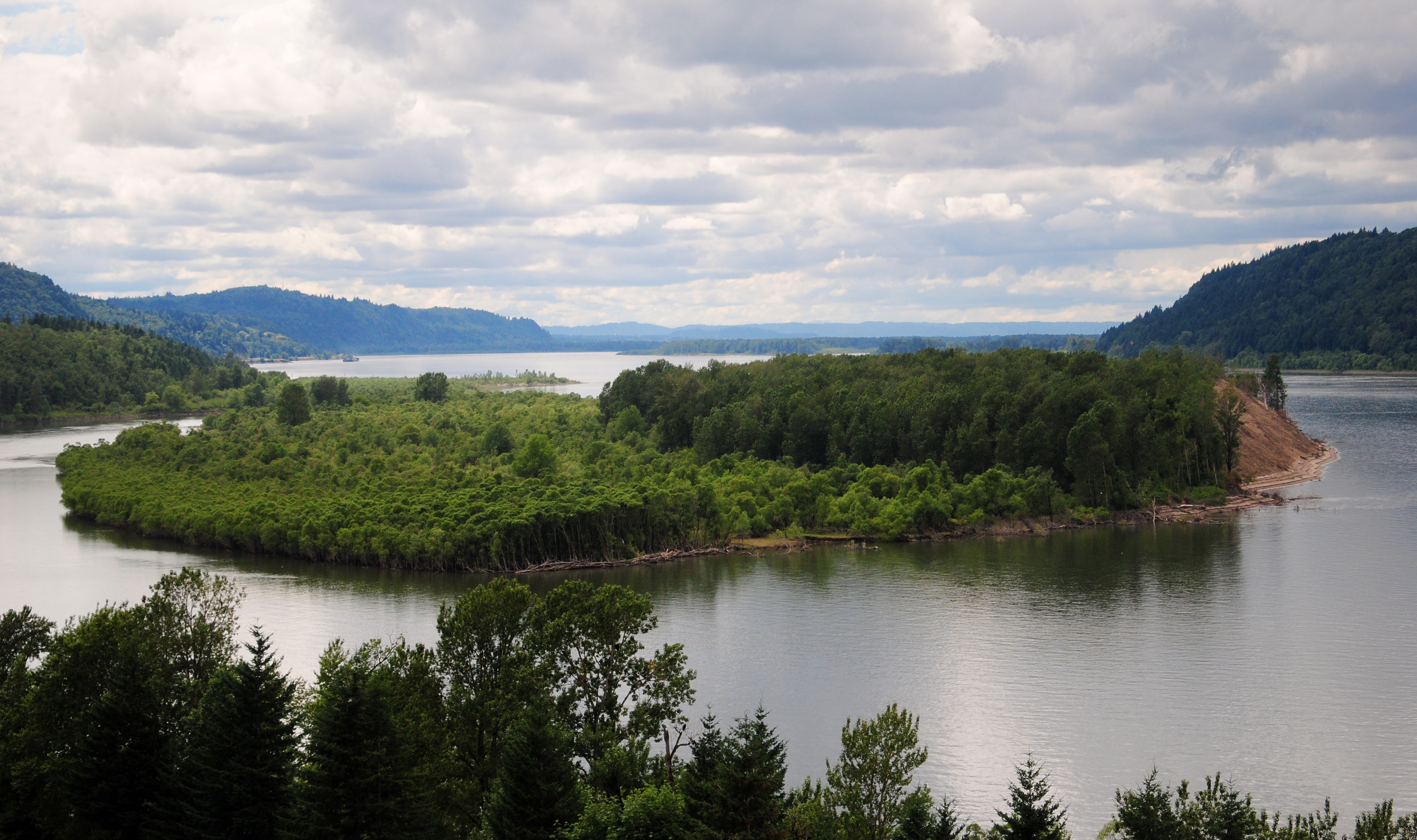
View of the island from Bridal Veil Overlook

== See also ==
- Sand Island (Clatsop County, Oregon)
