= Sanford Jacob Ramey =

American politician

Sanford Jacob Ramey (c.1798–1866) was a Virginia politician.

Ramey graduated from Yale College in 1821. Immediately after graduating, he commenced the study of medicine, but soon relinquished it for the study of law. He started the practice of law in Loudoun County, Virginia, but his attention was mostly given to agricultural pursuits, in which he was much interested, and to which most of his life was devoted. From 1837 to 1841, and at intervals afterward, he was a member of the Virginia House of Delegates from Loudon County. In 1844 he was married to Anna Maria Mason Grymes, of King George County, Virginia, by whom he had one son. He died in Loudon County in 1866, at the age of 68.
