= Sanford Barsky =

American pathologist

Sanford H. Barsky is an American professor of pathology and a writer of more than 150 peer reviewed articles.

Barsky obtained his medical degree through University of Pittsburgh and completed pathology training at Harvard Medical School. He completed fellowships at the National Cancer Institute and the National Institutes of Health. He was chief of pathology services at the Ohio State University College of Medicine before joining the University of Nevada School of Medicine in 2009. By 2007, he became a fellow of the American Association for the Advancement of Science.
