= Aleksandrs Roge =

Latvian footballer

Personal information
- Date of birth: 19 April 1896
- Place of birth: Riga, Latvia
- Date of death: 1945 (aged 48–49)

International career
Years	Team	Apps	(Gls)
- Latvia

Aleksandrs Roge (19 April 1896 – 1945) was a Latvian footballer. He competed in the men's tournament at the 1924 Summer Olympics.
