= Aleksandrs Petukhovs =

Latvian screenwriter and film director

- Born: 23 March 1967 (age 58); Riga, Latvia

Aleksandrs Petukhovs (born 23 March 1967) is a Latvian screenwriter and film director.

Petukhovs was born in Riga, Latvia. He studied film at the National Filmschool VGIK in Moscow. He worked as a film critic for the daily newspaper Pravda. In the 1990s he emigrated to Poland and became assistant director of Baranowski, Kieślowski and Polański. His 2004 film The Last Soviet Movie was nominated for the European Film Award.

== Films ==
- The Last Soviet Movie (2003)
- Gagarin's Dead (1991) – a short documentary
- Brezhniev's Foot (1990) – short
- Stalin's Fist (1989) – short
- Che Che Che (1988) – short
