= Sand Island (Clatsop County, Oregon) =

Island in the Columbia River, U.S.

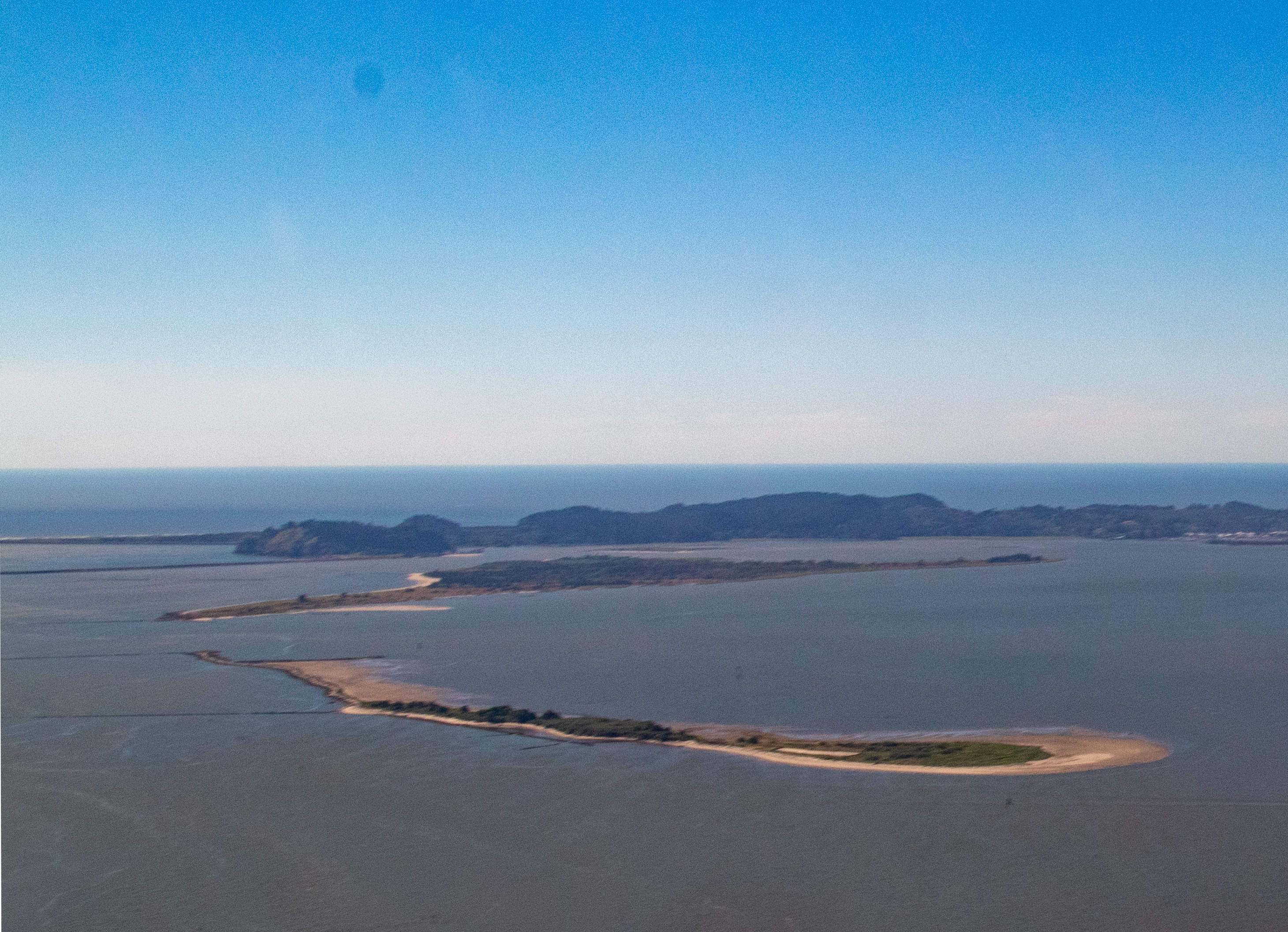
- Baker Bay, with Cape Disappointment in the background, Sand Island in the middle, and East Sand Island in the foreground

- Location within Oregon

Geography
- Location: Columbia River
- Coordinates: 46.2764897°N 124.0226523°W

Administration
- United States
- State: Oregon
- County: Clatsop

Sand Island is an island in Baker Bay in the mouth of the Columbia River, located in Clatsop County, Oregon. It is situated north of Fort Stevens State Park and the Clatsop Spit, east of Cape Disappointment, and just south of Ilwaco, Washington. Sand Island is also the northernmost point in the state of Oregon.

Sand Island is physically situated closer to the Washington mainland than to the Oregon mainland, although the border between the two states traverses the Columbia River north of the island. It often changes position in the river, and was described by Captain George Vancouver during his expedition but not by Lewis and Clark. The island was formerly subject to a border dispute between Oregon and Washington; Oregon won possession in a 1908 Supreme Court case, Washington v. Oregon.

According to an 1889 description in the Coast Pilot of California, Oregon, and Washington:

This low, sandy island is the visible danger in the middle of the entrance to the river. It lies inside the line joining Point Adams and Cape Disappointment. In 1841 it was almost abreast of Point Adams and less than one-third the width of the river from the point. In 1850 it had moved a little seaward, and was farther from Point Adams. In 1868 it was more than half-way across to Cape Disappointment but inside the line. In 1886 it had taken a shape like a boomerang with one point a mile and a quarter east of the Cape and on the same parallel, and the other point bent up the river and three miles northwest from Fort Stevens.

It is about two miles long and has an average width of nearly four hundred yards. It consists of loose sand raised a few feet above the river and covered with stranded trees, drift logs, etc., brought down by the freshets. Formerly the North Channel ran around the northeast side of this island, but the shoal from its northeast side has spread towards the Chinook Shoal, which also has developed towards Sand Island, and now there is passage-way for only nine or ten feet of water in place of four fathoms. The main channel of the river passes close under the south side of Sand Island and, striking the great Middle Sands, is divided, one part moving to the south and the other to the northwest.

There is a beacon built upon this island to afford ranges for vessels. During the fishing season there are sometimes net-racks and other temporary buildings on Sand Island for the accommodation of fishermen.

The island is covered in grass with a few small trees towards the center. East Sand Island, located nearby, is smaller and is home to thousands of nesting birds, who mostly avoid the larger Sand Island.

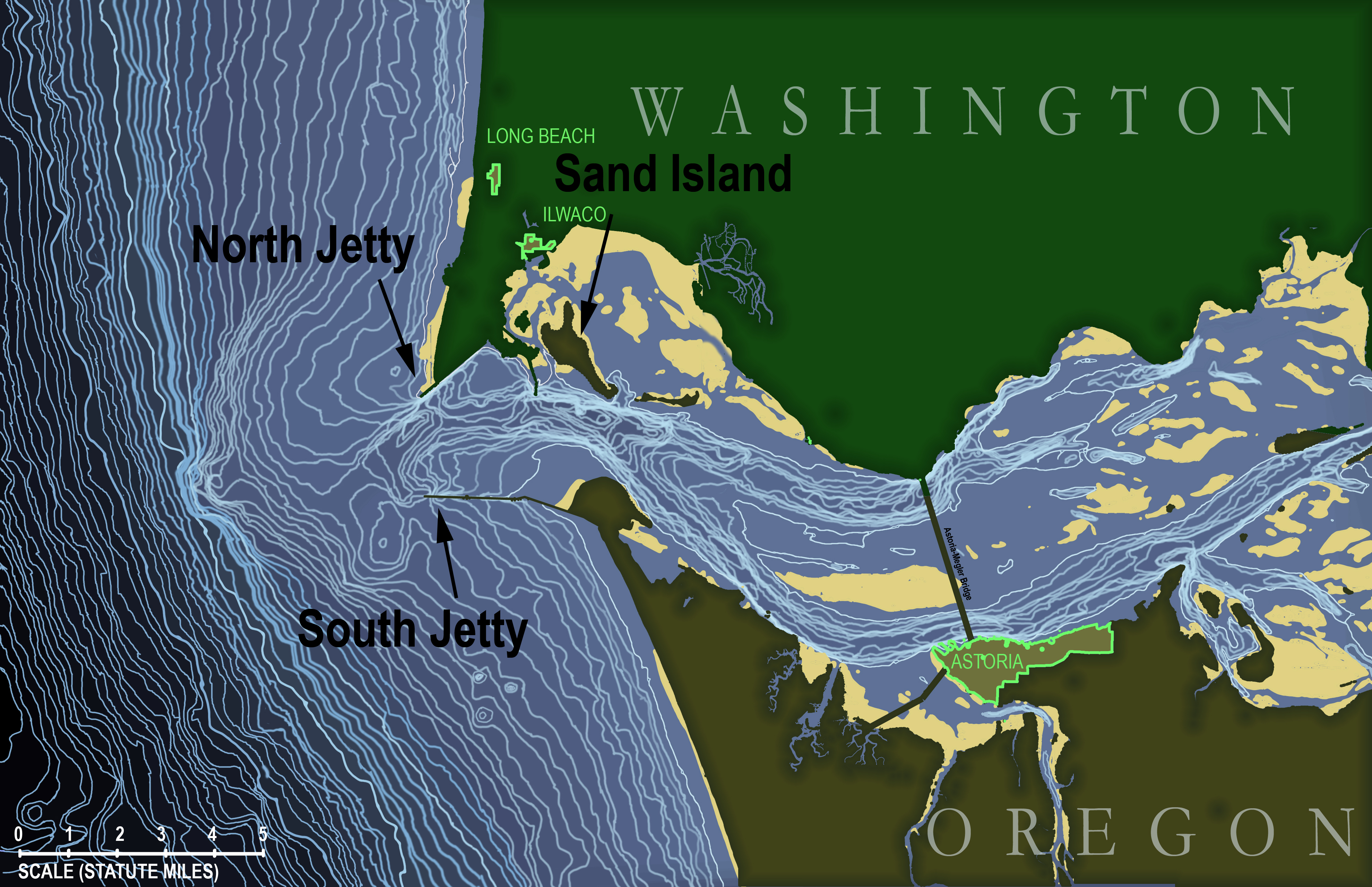
A map of the Columbia River mouth, with Sand Island labeled

== See also ==
- Sand Island (Multnomah County, Oregon)
