= Sandi Lah =

Slovenian footballer

Personal information
- Full name: Aleksander Lah
- Place of birth: Austro-Hungary
- Position: Forward

Youth career
- 1931–1932: Ilirija Ljubljana

Senior career*
Years	Team	Apps	(Gls)
1932–1933	Ilirija Ljubljana		
1934	Primorje Ljubljana		
1935–1938	SK Ljubljana	30	(9)
1938–1939	BASK Belgrade	17	(4)

International career
- Yugoslavia B

Managerial career
- 19xx–1961: Rudar Kakanj
- Borac Banja Luka
- * Club domestic league appearances and goals

Aleksander "Sandi" Lah was a Slovenian footballer.

== Career ==
Sandi Lah is mentioned at ND Ilirija 1911 official website as one of their best and most successful young players in club history. In 1931, he started playing for the youth team but was immediately incorporated to the main team of Ilirija. He played for Ilirija in the qualifiers for the 1932–33 Yugoslav Football Championship in both games played against AŠK Primorje which they lost 2–3 and 1–2. Curiously, he then played with AŠK Primorje after the two clubs merged, and subsequently with SK Ljubljana playing with them in the Yugoslav First League three consecutive seasons between 1935 and 1938. It was then that he achieved his highlight in his career when he moved to Yugoslav capital Belgrade and joined FK BASK playing with them in the 1938–39 Yugoslav Football Championship. On January 6, 1939, Yugoslav most popular daily newspaper, Politika choose the best players of the main top-league clubs to ask them about their reading habits, and Lah was chosen among BASK players having said his preference was the Russian literature.

In 1950, he headed the reestablishment of the football section at Ilirija.
