= Aleksandrs Kokarevs =

Latvian footballer and manager (born 1955)

Personal information
- Full name: Aleksandrs Kokarevs
- Date of birth: 18 September 1955 (age 71)
- Place of birth: Latvian SSR, Soviet Union
- Position: Defender

Senior career*
Years	Team	Apps	(Gls)
1977–1978	Daugava Rīga	40+	(1+)
1978–1980	Dinamo Leningrad		
1981–1983	Daugava Rīga	36+	(1+)
?	Celtnieks Rīga		

Managerial career
- ?: Kvadrāts Rīga
- 1996: RAF Jelgava
- * Club domestic league appearances and goals

Aleksandrs Kokarevs (born 18 September 1955) is a former Latvian football player and manager.

Kokarevs played for Daugava Rīga the biggest part of his career. His best seasons were in 1977 (40 matches, 1 goal) and 1981 (36 matches, 1 goal). From 1978 to 1980 he played with Dinamo Leningrad. After the second season which Daugava played under Jānis Skredelis Kokarevs retired from the club as the competition in defense in Daugava was very tough and included Sergejs Semjonovs, Dainis Deglis and Jurijs Ševļakovs. Later Kokarevs played with Celtnieks Rīga in the Latvian league under Viktors Ņesterenko.

Kokarevs coaching career's highest point was when he was offered to coach RAF Jelgava before the Latvian Cup final in 1996. Kokarevs took up the job and his club won 2:1 against Skonto FC. Before that he had also managed Kvadrāts Rīga in 1. līga.
