= Sandy Bay (Newfoundland and Labrador) =

Natural bay in Newfoundland and Labrador, Canada

Coordinates: 53.400°N 55.797°W

Sandy Bay is a natural bay off the island of Newfoundland in the province of Newfoundland and Labrador, Canada.
