= Sandy, Taylor County, West Virginia =

Sandy
- Unincorporated community
- Location within the state of West Virginia Sandy (the United States)
- Coordinates: 39°16′11″N 79°57′43″W
- Country: United States
- State: West Virginia
- County: Taylor
- Elevation: 1,099 ft (335 m)
- Time zone: UTC-5 (Eastern (EST))
  - Summer (DST): UTC-4 (EDT)
- GNIS ID: 1689905

Sandy is a former unincorporated community in Taylor County, West Virginia, USA. It was situated on the Tygart Valley River at the mouth of Sandy Creek. The site is now underwater in Tygart Lake, having been inundated after construction of the Tygart Dam (1934–38).
