= Sandy, Kanawha County, West Virginia =

Sandy, West Virginia
- Unincorporated community
- Location within West Virginia and the United States Sandy (the United States)
- Coordinates: 38°24′33″N 81°30′39″W
- Country: United States
- State: West Virginia
- County: Kanawha
- Elevation: 610 ft (190 m)
- Time zone: UTC-5 (Eastern (EST))
  - Summer (DST): UTC-4 (EDT)
- GNIS ID: 1546400

Sandy is an unincorporated community in Kanawha County, West Virginia, United States.
