= Sandy Islands =

Sandy Islands may refer to the following geographical locations:

- Sandy Islands, a group of islands in Whitefish Bay, Lake Superior, Canada
- Sandy Islands, a group of islands in the northern basin of Lake Winnipeg in Manitoba, Canada
- Sandy Islands, a group of islands in Newfoundland and Labrador, Canada
- Sandy Islands, a group of islands in New Brunswick, Canada
- Sandy Islands, a group of islands in Saskatchewan, Canada
