= John V. Tunney =

American politician (1934–2018)

John Tunney
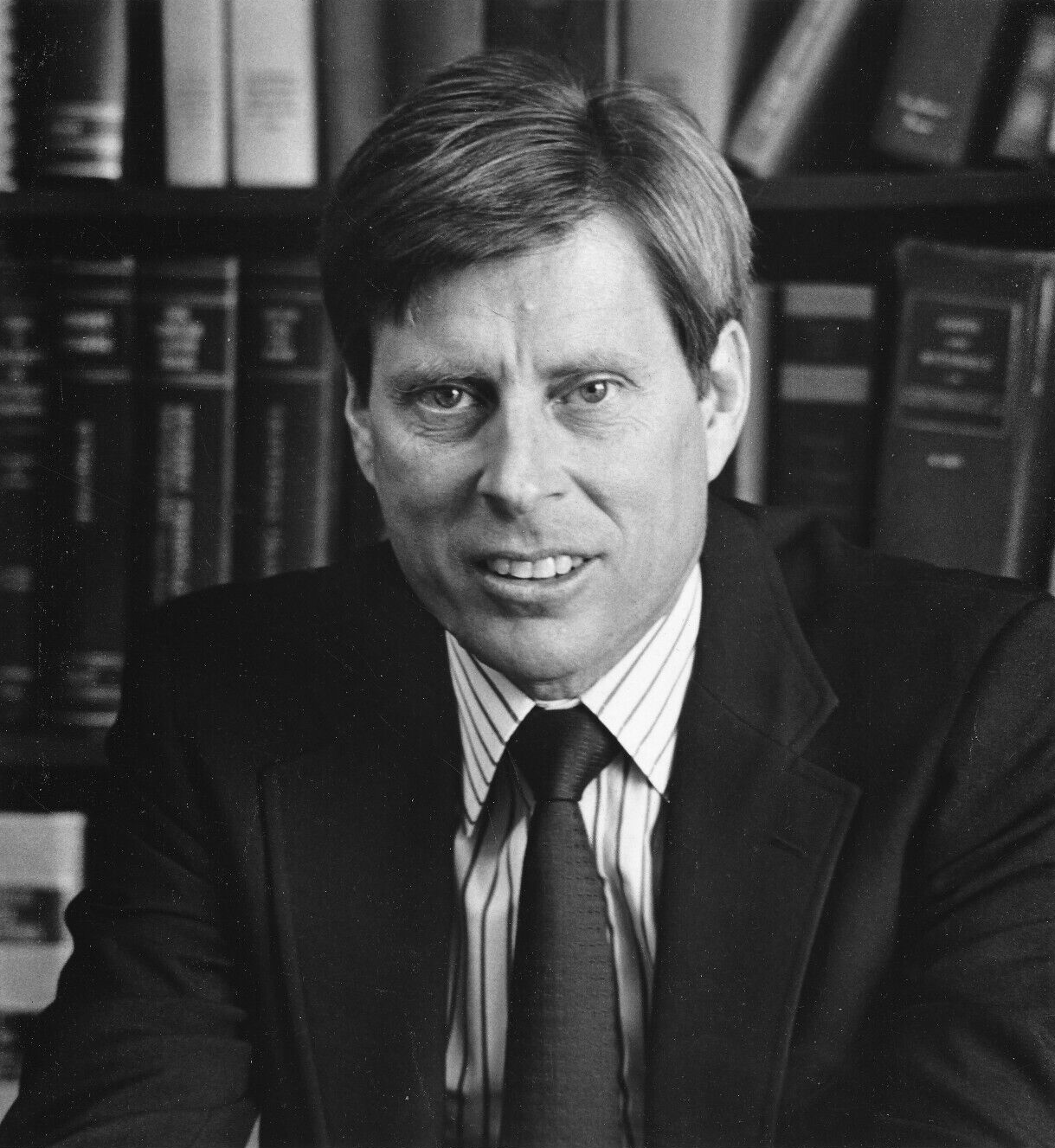

United States Senator from California
- In office January 2, 1971 – January 1, 1977
- Preceded by: George Murphy
- Succeeded by: S. I. Hayakawa

Member of the U.S. House of Representatives from California's 38th district
- In office January 3, 1965 – January 2, 1971
- Preceded by: Patrick M. Martin
- Succeeded by: Victor Veysey

Personal details
- Born: John Varick Tunney; June 26, 1934 New York City, U.S.
- Died: January 12, 2018 (aged 83) Los Angeles, California, U.S.
- Party: Democratic
- Spouses: Mieke Sprengers (m. 1959; div. 1973); Kathinka Osborne (m. 1977)
- Children: 3
- Parents: Gene Tunney; Polly Lauder
- Relatives: Lauder Greenway Family
- Education: Yale University (BA); University of Virginia (LLB)

Military service
- Branch/service: United States Air Force
- Years of service: 1960–1963
- Rank: Captain
- Unit: Air Force Judge Advocate General's Corps

John Varick Tunney (June 26, 1934 – January 12, 2018) was an American politician who served as a United States senator and representative from the state of California in the 1960s and 1970s. A Democrat, Tunney was known for his focus on anti-trust and environmental legislation, especially the Noise Pollution Control Act of 1972 and the anti-trust Tunney Act. Tunney also strongly supported civil rights and shepherded the 1975 expansion of the Voting Rights Act.

He was the son of boxing champion Gene Tunney. Tunney was a roommate of Edward Kennedy's, a fellow Irish-American Catholic, at the University of Virginia School of Law, and became one of his best friends. Tunney won the 1970 United States Senate election in California, but he was narrowly defeated for re-election in 1976 by Republican S. I. Hayakawa. After his loss, Tunney became an environmental activist.

== Early life and career ==
Tunney was born on June 26, 1934 at Harkness Pavilion Medical Center in Manhattan, the second son of heavyweight boxing champion Gene Tunney and Polly Lauder Tunney, who was a member of the Lauder-Greenway family. He grew up on the family's Star Meadow Farm in Stamford, Connecticut and attended New Canaan Country School and the Westminster School.

Tunney graduated from Yale University in 1956 with a degree in anthropology, where he was a member of the St. Anthony Hall fraternity. He attended The Hague Academy of International Law in the Netherlands and graduated from the University of Virginia School of Law in 1959, where he was roommates with future Massachusetts senator Ted Kennedy, who remained a close friend. Tunney was admitted to the Virginia and New York bars in 1959 and practiced law in New York City. He married his first wife, Mieke Sprengers, in 1959.

Tunney joined the United States Air Force as a judge advocate and served until he was discharged as a captain in April 1963. He taught business law at the University of California, Riverside in 1961 and 1962. In 1963, he was admitted to practice law in California. He was a special adviser to the President's Committee on Juvenile Delinquency and Youth Crime from 1963 until 1968.

== U.S. House of Representatives ==
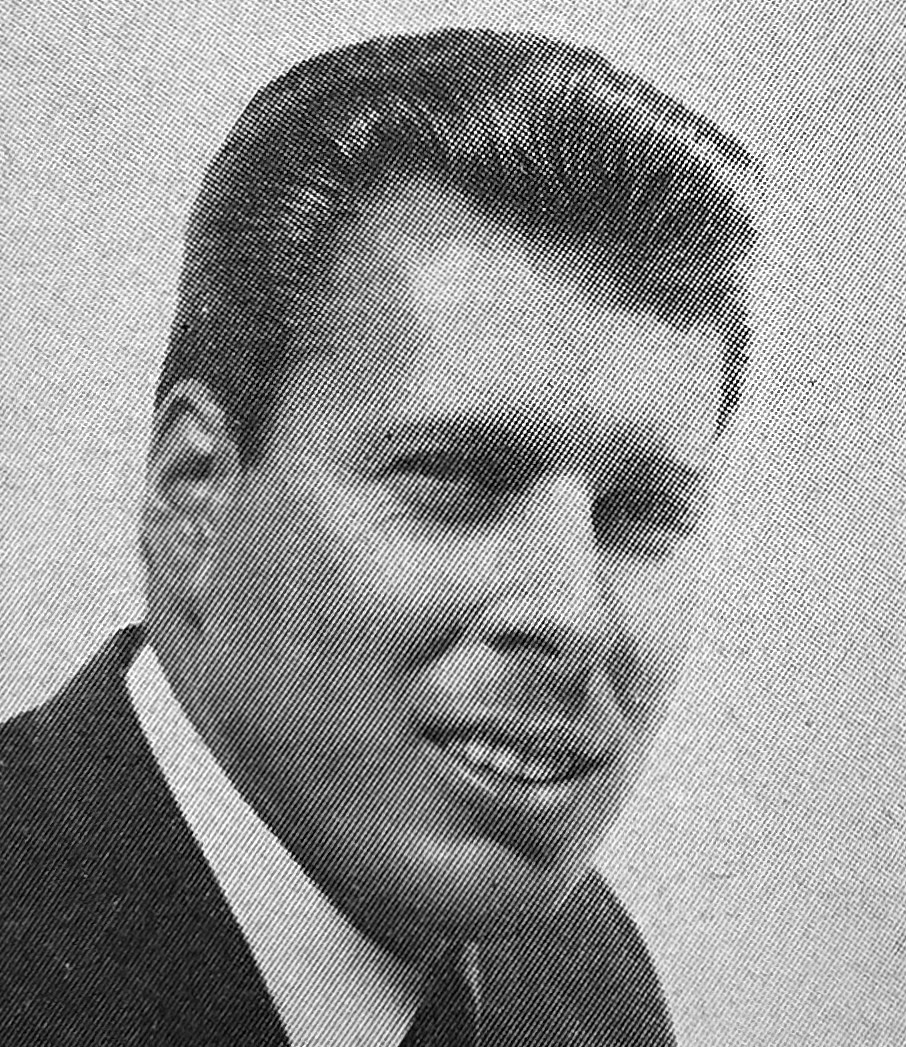
Rep. John Tunney (D-California) poses for his official congressional portrait photograph, c. 1966-67

In 1964, Tunney was elected as a Democrat in the United States House of Representatives from California's 38th congressional district (Riverside and Imperial counties). He served from January 3, 1965, until his resignation on January 2, 1971, when he became a U.S. senator. Members of the Kennedy family, such as Patricia Kennedy Lawford, campaigned for Tunney, as did his father's old rival Jack Dempsey. During his tenure in Congress, he voted in favor of the Voting Rights Act of 1965 and the Civil Rights Act of 1968.

In July 1969, while serving as a congressman, Tunney was called to Hyannisport, Massachusetts by Senator Kennedy, a friend and former law-school roommate, to assist in dealing with the death of Mary Jo Kopechne following the Chappaquiddick incident.

Noting his "service to the state," Tunney was made an honorary member of Phi Sigma Kappa by the fraternity's Cal State Northridge chapter in 1970.

== U.S. Senate ==
In early 1970, Tunney announced that he would seek the Democratic nomination for the U.S. Senate. His announcement was followed by that of fellow Democratic congressman George Brown, Jr. Their primary battle turned into one of the most bitter in California history. One of the key issues was the military draft. While Brown and Tunney both questioned expanding U.S. involvement in Vietnam, Brown opposed a continuation of the military draft while Tunney favored it. This conflict gave incumbent Republican George Murphy an early lead in the polls. Murphy's staunch support for the Vietnam War hurt his campaign and, as the general election approached, Tunney overtook him in the polls. The Murphy campaign suffered another setback when he underwent surgery for throat cancer, weakening his voice to a whisper. The Tunney campaign used his youthful appearance and high energy to contrast with the aging Murphy. Tunney's hairstyle and mannerisms drew comparisons to Robert F. Kennedy; The New York Times praised Tunney for his "Kennedyesque, prize-fighter glamour" and "Kennedy-like accent and mannerisms", calling him "a swinger who wears his hair styled like a tight, furry helmet". Ultimately, Californians split their ticket in the 1970 midterm election, re-electing Republican governor Ronald Reagan and electing Democrat Tunney to the Senate.

In the 1972 Democratic Party presidential primaries, John Tunney, described by The New York Times as one of the best friends of Edward Kennedy, endorsed Edmund Muskie. This endorsement was part of a larger effort by Kennedy to aid Muskie - K. Dun Gifford, a former member of Kennedy's Senate staff, agreed to join the Muskie organization in Massachusetts. Kennedy's decision to support Muskie was considered surprising, as George McGovern was considered to be ideologically closer to Ted Kennedy's views than Muskie was. Media hinted that Kennedy's support could then be personal rather than ideological - Muskie was a Roman Catholic just like Kennedy and Tunney. The New York Times stated that "Mr. Tunney's endorsement is one of the most important Mr. Muskie has received since his Presidential campaign began"; Tunney was also considered as a possible running mate for Muskie in the event of Muskie's presidential nomination.

During his Senate term, Tunney produced a weekly radio report to California, in which he often interviewed other legislators. In 1974, he authored an antitrust bill known as the Tunney Act. Antitrust legislation was central to Tunney's politics, along with his focus on environmental protection and civil rights - Tunney's most important bills were the Noise Pollution Control Act of 1972, as well as the 1975 expansion of the landmark Voting Rights Act. Tunney would later write a book, The Changing Dream, about what he saw as a looming resource crisis.

In December 1975, Tunney advocated for using American diplomacy in dealing with the Angolan Civil War. American covert and military support for pro-U.S. rebels there suggested a return to the policies that had led up toward the highly unpopular Vietnam War. The Senate had postponed passage of the annual defense budget because of concerns that the bill contained funds for covert operations against Soviet-backed Angolan rebels. The Central Intelligence Agency conducted highly classified briefings for senators, including Tunney, providing an accounting of where money was being spent. However, they failed to persuade him of the policy's usefulness. It was at this time that Tunney introduced an amendment that would cut $33 million from the defense budget that was to be allocated to pro-U.S. rebels for covert operations. That effectively ended current and future covert funding from defense appropriations for Angola. Aid supporters filibustered the cutoff, offered counter-amendments and tried to shelve the amendment in committee.

The Ford administration, which strongly supported the covert operations, asserted that the amendment was a threat to both U.S.–Soviet and U.S.–Cuban relations. Cuba had deployed combat troops to Angola a month earlier. On December 20, 1975, Tunney's amendment passed 54–22 with the support of 16 Republicans. Its passage also increased the power of the Congress in foreign affairs at the expense of the executive branch.

As a prominent Democratic politician in the populous and electorally pivotal state of California, Tunney was considered a potential "national leader in the making", but "instead he seemed mired in indecision about both the issues and his own future". Jeremy Larner, a former speechwriter often hired by Democratic politicians, provided a fictionalized story of John Tunney in the 1972 film The Candidate. In it, Tunney was portrayed as a well intentioned but aimless young Democrat who was preyed upon by his domineering father. In real life, Tunney was accused of being unfaithful to his wife and underwent a divorce, which further complicated his 1976 re-election run. The film and divorce tarnished John Tunney's image as a Kennedy-like figure, and made his 1970 electoral campaign backfire, given his image as a youthful, relaxed and aspiring politician; one ad showed him walking on the beach with a suit jacket slung over his shoulder. Tunney now faced accusations of being an adulterous divorcee and of dating teenage girls. However, these claims were never substantiated, and friends and colleagues described Tunney's "playboy" label as completely false.

Tunney was renominated for a second term in 1976 despite a high-profile challenge from his left in the form of Tom Hayden. Tunney was attacked by Hayden's wife, Jane Fonda, who accused Tunney of being a "playboy dilettante who dates teenage girls". Hayden also criticized Tunney, mentioning his friendship with Edward Kennedy and calling Tunney "a Chappaquiddick waiting to happen" — a reference to the Chappaquiddick incident, which tarnished Kennedy's reputation; Hayden later apologized for the accusation. That fall, Tunney was defeated in his reelection bid by Republican S. I. Hayakawa, the former president of San Francisco State University, who had never held elected office. Hayakawa ran as an outsider and highlighted Tunney's numerous travels, missed Senate votes and poor Senate attendance record during the campaign. He also painted Tunney as a flip-flopper.

Still, Tunney led in the polls right up to election night, despite a steadily shrinking lead as the campaign wore on. Although Democrat Jimmy Carter won the presidential election, Republican President Gerald Ford carried California, and Tunney lost to Hayakawa in a mild upset. Tunney resigned from his Senate seat on January 1, 1977, two days before his term would officially expire, to allow Hayakawa to have seniority over other incoming senators.

Throughout Tunney's Senate term, he served as California's junior senator and served with Alan Cranston.

After his 1976 Senate defeat, Tunney resumed practicing law and was a named partner at Manatt, Phelps, Rothenberg & Tunney (1976–1987). He also served on several corporate boards.

== Interest in constitutional rights and government surveillance ==
In early 1975, soon after becoming chairman of the Senate Judiciary Subcommittee on Constitutional Rights, Tunney asked the subcommittee staff to initiate a long-term comprehensive investigation into the technological aspects of surveillance. The Surveillance Technology Report of 1976 stated that "This investigation of surveillance was the first attempt to organize an immense amount of data in a comprehensive and usable format and to provide a framework for future analyses and, ultimately, for the creation of institutional mechanisms that will diminish the threats posted by surveillance technology." In the preface of the report Tunney stated, "If knowledge is power, then certainly the secret and unlimited acquisition of the most detailed knowledge about the most intimate aspects of a person's thoughts and actions conveys extraordinary power over that person's life and reputation to the snooper who possesses the highly personal information."

Tunney also served as chairman of the Commerce Subcommittee on Science and Technology and as a member of the Joint Atomic Energy Committee.

== Personal life ==
Born into an Irish-American family, Tunney was a Roman Catholic. Originally, Tunney's parents wanted him to become a priest, which was a common desire for immigrant Irish parents at the time.

On May 22, 1972, Tunney's Dutch-born wife Mieke sued for dissolution of their 13-year marriage on the basis of irreconcilable differences. In addition to alimony, child support and half of the community property, she requested custody of the couple's three children.

On April 23, 1977, Tunney married Kathinka Osborne, a member of the 1964 Swedish Olympic ski team, with longtime friend Senator Kennedy serving as the best man.

In February 2003, Tunney joined former Senate colleagues George McGovern and Fred Harris in opposing the Iraq War.

John and Kathinka Tunney lived primarily in Sun Valley, Idaho (with homes also in New York and Los Angeles). He was chairman of the board of the Armand Hammer Museum of Art and Culture Center at UCLA and remained active in environmental causes. Tunney retired from the Hammer Museum board at the end of 2013. In February 2015, a pedestrian bridge at the museum designed by architect Michael Maltzan was named in Tunney's honor.

Writer Jeremy Larner and director Michael Ritchie reportedly based the 1972 film The Candidate, starring Robert Redford, on Tunney's successful Senate race in 1970.

Following his narrow defeat in 1976, Tunney largely stayed out of politics and committed himself to environmental causes, including serving on the board of Living with Wolves, an organization dedicated to raising consciousness of the animals’ importance.

In The Ted Kennedy Jr. Story, a 1986 NBC-TV movie based on Ted Kennedy Jr. losing one of his legs to cancer, Tunney was portrayed by Michael J. Shannon.

Tunney died of prostate cancer on January 12, 2018, in Brentwood, Los Angeles, at the age of 83.

== See also ==
- List of United States senators from California

U.S. House of Representatives
Preceded by Patrick M. Martin	Member of the U.S. House of Representatives from California's 38th congressional district 1965–1971	Succeeded by Victor Veysey
Party political offices
Preceded by Pierre Salinger	Democratic nominee for U.S. Senator from California (Class 1); 1970, 1976	Succeeded by Jerry Brown
U.S. Senate
Preceded by George Murphy	U.S. Senator (Class 1) from California; 1971–1977; Served alongside: Alan Cranston	Succeeded by S. I. Hayakawa
Honorary titles
Preceded by Bob Packwood	Baby of the Senate; 1971–1973	Succeeded by Joe Biden
