= Antitrust Act =

Antitrust Act can refer to:

- The Sherman Antitrust Act, first United States federal government action to limit monopolies
  - Sherman Antitrust Act (federal preemption)
- The Clayton Antitrust Act, enacted to remedy deficiencies in antitrust law created under the Sherman Antitrust Act
- Hart–Scott–Rodino Antitrust Improvements Act
- Tunney Act, officially known as the Antitrust Procedures and Penalties Act

== See also ==
- United States antitrust law
