= Escape to Hell =

Gaddafi essays on politics religion

Escape to Hell and Other Stories is a collection of essays by Muammar Gaddafi, published in English translation in 1989. It was translated from a 1996 French version of the text derived from the original Arabic version. It contains an introduction written by journalist Pierre Salinger. The book has been described as "a grab-bag of short essays, allegories, commentary pieces and bits of abstract thought on religion and politics." Gaddafi's style has been called heavily "sarcastic" and satirical in tone.
