= Pierre Salinger =

American politician and journalist (1925–2004)

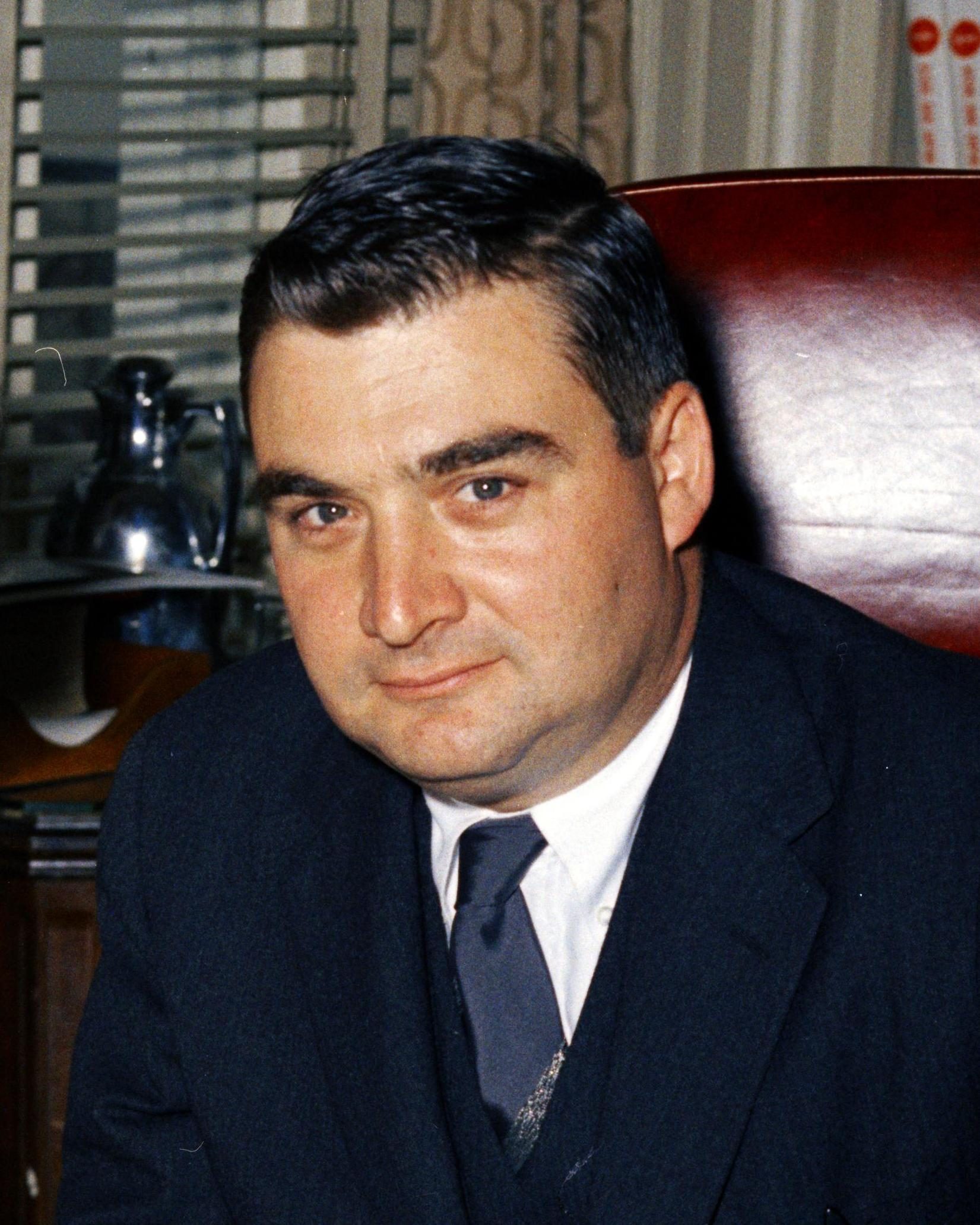
- Salinger in 1961

United States Senator from California
- In office August 4, 1964 – December 31, 1964
- Appointed by: Pat Brown
- Preceded by: Clair Engle
- Succeeded by: George Murphy

9th White House Press Secretary
- In office January 20, 1961 – March 19, 1964
- President: John F. Kennedy; Lyndon B. Johnson
- Preceded by: James Hagerty
- Succeeded by: George Reedy

Personal details
- Born: Pierre Emil George Salinger; June 14, 1925 San Francisco, California, U.S.
- Died: October 16, 2004 (aged 79) Cavaillon, France
- Resting place: Arlington National Cemetery
- Party: Democratic
- Spouses: Renée Labouré (m. 1947; div. 1957); Nancy Joy (m. 1957; div. 1965); Nicole Gillman (m. 1965; div. 1989); Nicole de Menthon (m. 1989)
- Education: San Francisco State University (attended); University of San Francisco (BS)

Military service
- Allegiance: United States
- Branch/service: United States Navy
- Battles/wars: World War II

Pierre Emil George Salinger (June 14, 1925 – October 16, 2004) was an American journalist, author and politician. He served as the ninth White House press secretary for United States presidents John F. Kennedy and Lyndon B. Johnson. Salinger served as a United States Senator in 1964 and as campaign manager for the 1968 Robert F. Kennedy presidential campaign.

After leaving politics, Salinger became known for his work as an ABC News correspondent, particularly for his coverage of the 1979-81 Iran Hostage Crisis; the 1988 bombing of Pan Am Flight 103 over Lockerbie, Scotland; and his claims of a missile being the cause of the explosion of TWA Flight 800 in 1996.

== Early life ==
Salinger was born in San Francisco, California. His father, Herbert Salinger, was a New York City–born mining engineer, and his mother, Jehanne (née Biétry), was a French-born journalist. Salinger's mother was Catholic and his father was Jewish.

His maternal grandfather was Pierre Biétry, a member of the French National Assembly, who became known for his "vigorous" defense of Capt. Alfred Dreyfus, who was wrongly convicted of treason in 1894. Biétry died in Indochina at the age of 39.

Salinger was considered a child prodigy in music who played on a grand piano even before he learned to read. After his family moved to Canada, his parents discovered his innate talent at the piano and he was enrolled into the Toronto Conservatory of Music, where he was groomed to become a concert pianist. He recalled, "Each weekday, a tutor came to the house for three hours of academic instruction, and when she left, I was 'free' to practice the piano for four or five hours."

He gave his first public concert when he was six and was considered a concert pianist. He continued studying piano after they returned to San Francisco and was able play scores by Bach, Debussy, Beethoven and George Gershwin, whom he once met.

When he was 12, Salinger's mother told him his full-time piano studies were isolating him from society. She suggested he spend a year away from piano to engage in other social activities, including sports. He did, but never returned to his original goal of becoming a pianist and instead wanted to become a writer or journalist.

His talent and love of music carried over into his career as press secretary when, at the behest of First Lady Jacqueline Kennedy, (Note: Jacqueline Kennedy, unlike husband John F. Kennedy, loved music-related culture, as she had studied piano and ballet in her early years and as a student at Vassar. But her husband did not appreciate or enjoy most kinds of music, which he said hurt his ears. She said that symphonies put him to sleep. After he became president, she relied on Salinger to suggest and invite artists to appear at the While House. Toward the end of his life, Kennedy's opinion had changed somewhat, and he "came to feel that progress in the arts was intimately related to all that he wanted America to be," which led to his supporting the creation of what became the John F. Kennedy Center for the Performing Arts in Washington, D.C.) he would invite musicians such as Pablo Casals and Igor Stravinsky to the White House. President Lyndon B. Johnson once had Salinger perform on the piano for 600 of his guests. "If Jackie Kennedy was the one who thought maybe America was ready for a higher culture, her ally in it or her agent was Pierre", said Richard Reeves, author of President Kennedy: Profile of Power (1993).

Salinger attended public magnet Lowell High School in San Francisco. He attended San Francisco State University (then College) from 1941 to 1943, during which time he became managing editor and columnist for the student newspaper.

Salinger left SF State to enlist in the United States Navy in July 1943 and became skipper of a submarine chaser off Okinawa during World War II. He distinguished himself during Typhoon Louise by making a daring rescue of some men stranded on a reef. For this act, he received the Navy and Marine Corps medal.

After serving with the United States Navy to the rank of Lieutenant, junior grade during World War II, he finished his studies at the University of San Francisco, earning a BS in 1947.

He began his journalism career as "Lucky Pierre", a horse racing columnist and later reporter for the San Francisco Chronicle and as a contributing editor to Collier's in the 1940s and 1950s. He was a guest lecturer in journalism at Mills College from 1950 to 1955.

== Kennedy years ==
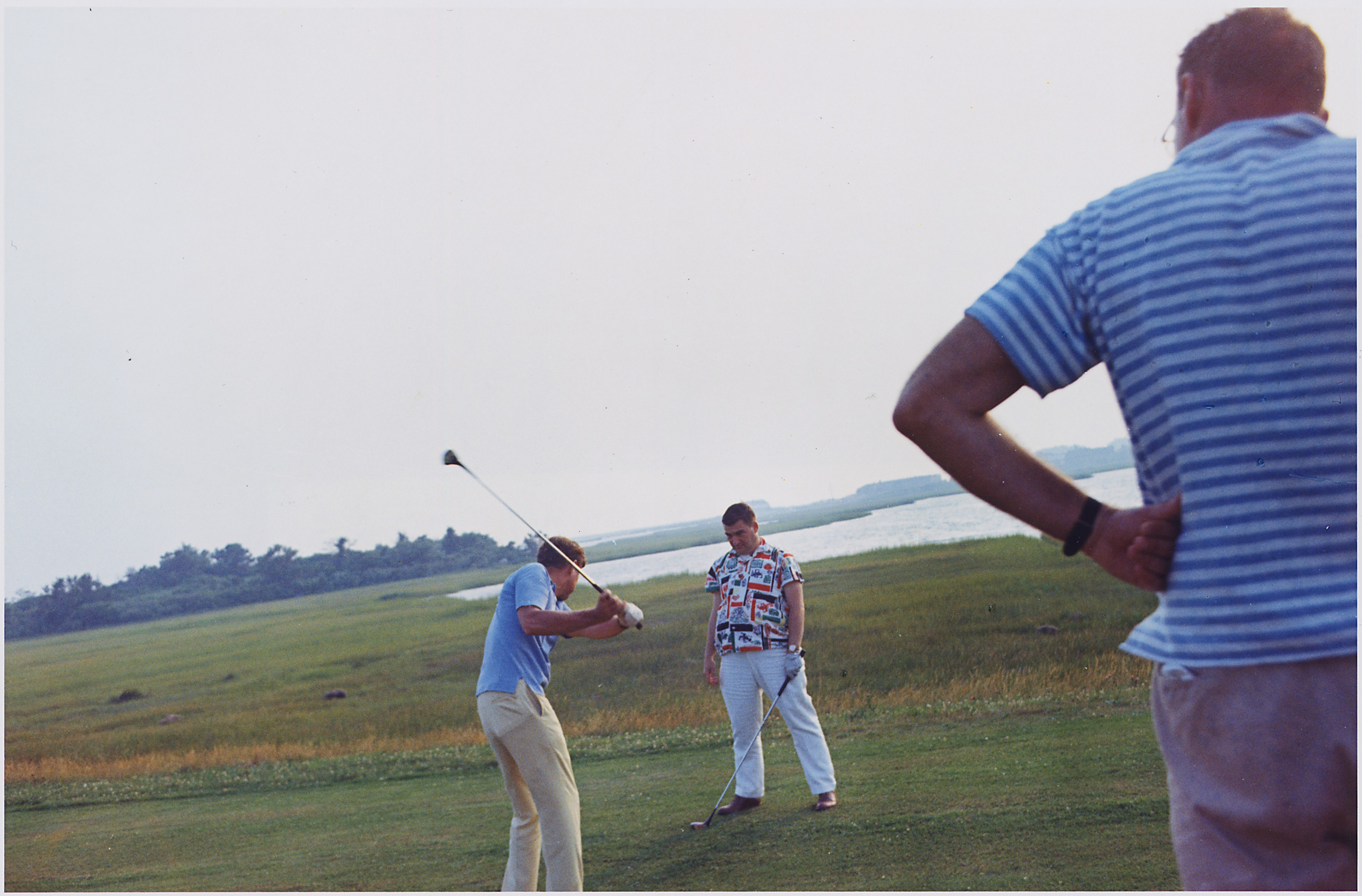
Salinger golfs with President John F. Kennedy at the Hyannisport Club, July 27, 1963

After Salinger researched and wrote a number of articles in 1956 about labor union leader Jimmy Hoffa, Robert F. Kennedy hired him to be legal counsel for the Senate Select Committee investigating organized crime, known as the McClellan Committee. Later, Kennedy wanted him to be press secretary to his brother, John F. Kennedy, who was then a member of the Senate.

Salinger worked on John Kennedy's presidential campaign in 1960 and became one of its leading figures. He was at times described as being part of Kennedy's Kitchen Cabinet of unofficial advisers. After Kennedy was elected in 1961, he hired Salinger as his press secretary. When Kennedy became the first president to allow live television broadcasts of his news conferences, Salinger was said to have managed the press corps with "wit, enthusiasm and considerable disdain for detail", which made him a "celebrity in his own right".

He accompanied Kennedy to conferences with other world leaders, including the 1961 meeting with Soviet Premier Nikita Khrushchev in Vienna. When an aide to Khrushchev invited Salinger to Moscow, Kennedy assented to his going. Kennedy, however, had to explain to the press corps why he was sending a young and inexperienced Salinger to the Soviet Union.

In May 1962, Salinger went to Moscow alone to meet with the press. Upon his arrival, he was unexpectedly invited to spend time with Khrushchev at his dacha outside the city. They shared meals and took long hikes along country roads as they discussed politics and world events, such as the Berlin crisis. Salinger spent 16 hours over two days with Khrushchev. After their first day together, Khrushchev said, "I have had such a good time today, I think I will do it again tomorrow."

In October 1962, Salinger briefed the press about what had been learned about Soviet missiles being stationed in Cuba. He later said that Kennedy's actions during that crisis were among the most incredible things a president had ever done in the 20th century and noted how close the countries had come to nuclear war.

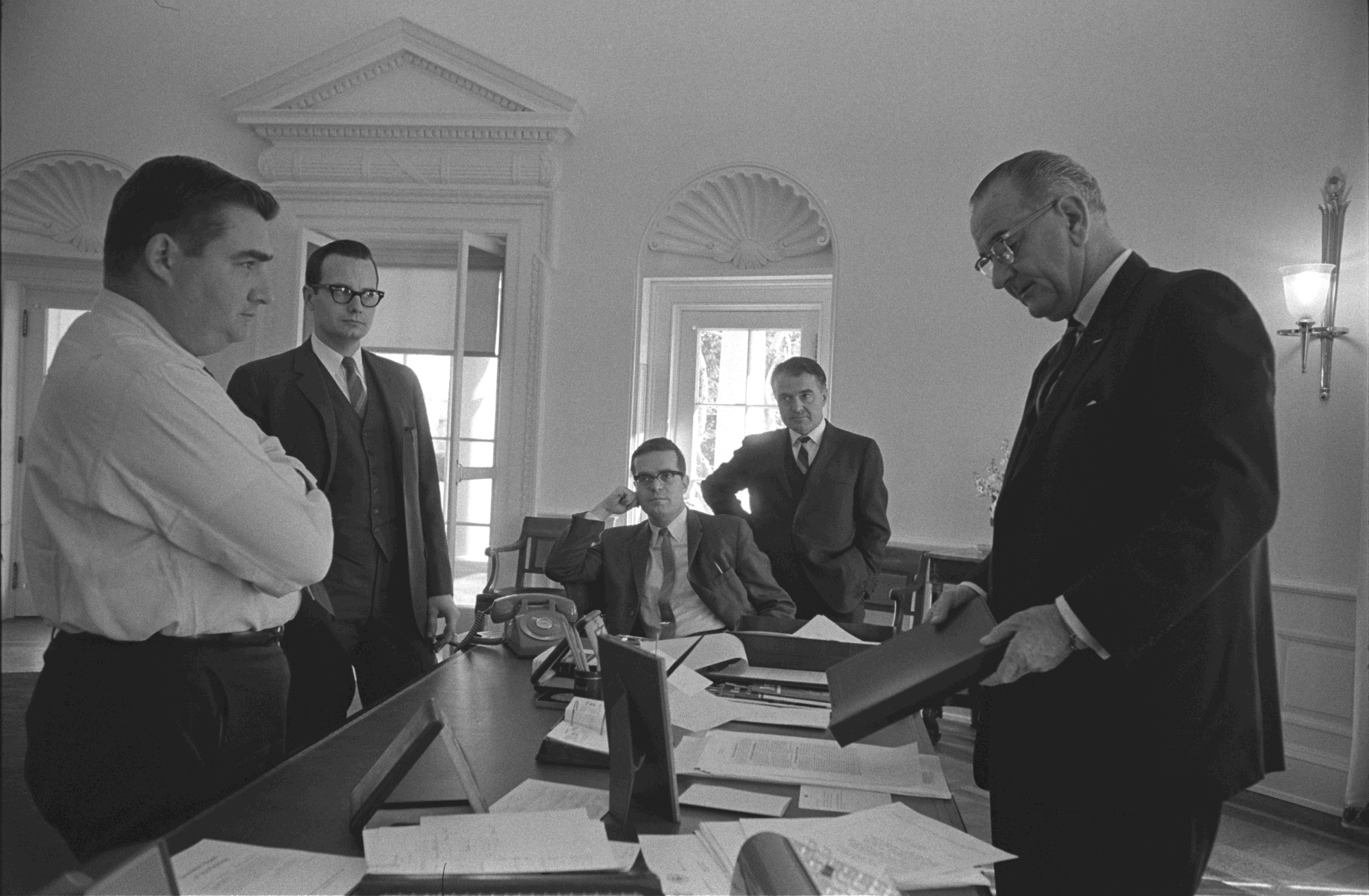
Salinger continued as press secretary for United States President Lyndon B. Johnson after the assassination of President Kennedy.

At the time of President Kennedy's assassination in November 1963, Salinger was on a plane to Tokyo with six Cabinet members, including Secretary of State Dean Rusk. Salinger was to attend an economic conference and start working on a February 1964 visit by Kennedy as the first United States president to visit Japan since the end of World War II.

Salinger was retained by President Lyndon B. Johnson as press secretary. Johnson said, "I don't have to tell you that Mr. Salinger was John F. Kennedy's press secretary ... and I don't know what I would have done without him, night and day, over this past month." At one point in his career, Salinger briefly considered running for president, as he described in an interview about his Memoir in 1995.

Salinger published a biography of the president, With Kennedy, in 1966.

== Senate run ==
Following his service in the Kennedy and Johnson administrations, Salinger returned to California and ran for the Senate. He defeated California State Controller Alan Cranston in a contentious Democratic primary. California Governor Pat Brown, who had supported Cranston, appointed Salinger a Democratic senator to fill the vacancy resulting from the July 30, 1964, death of retiring Senator Clair Engle; he took office on August 4, 1964. In his bid for a full six-year term in the 1964 election, Salinger was defeated by former actor and vaudeville song and dance man George Murphy following a campaign in which Salinger's recent return to his native state became an issue and his legal residency was being challenged in court. He was also hurt by his adamant support, despite advice from his political managers, of legislation banning racial housing discrimination. Salinger's loss made California the sole Democratic-held seat to go Republican in what was otherwise a Democratic landslide.

Salinger resigned from the Senate on December 31, 1964, three days before his term was to expire. Murphy, who was to take office on January 3, 1965, was appointed to fill the remaining two days of Salinger's term, giving Murphy a slight advantage in seniority in the Senate over other members elected in 1964 when seniority was more vital in Senate affairs than now.

Salinger went on to work in the private sector, which included a stint as a vice president of Continental Airlines. He was a limited partner in a syndicate led by Gene Klein and Sam Schulman that bought a controlling interest in the San Diego Chargers for $10 million on 25 August 1966. He sold his interest in the ballclub two years later prior to the start of the 1968 season.

== Batman appearance ==
Salinger appeared in the January 4, 1968, episode of the ABC Television series Batman portraying "Lucky Pierre," a lawyer who defends Catwoman and the Joker in a trial. As a joke on the real Salinger's political career, Pierre is introduced with a photograph of Richard Nixon on his desk.

== Robert Kennedy assassination ==
Salinger was one of the managers of United States Senator Robert F. Kennedy's 1968 presidential campaign and was standing 10 to 12 feet away when Kennedy was fatally shot in the kitchen of the Ambassador Hotel in Los Angeles, California on June 5 (he died the next day). Salinger claimed that Jim McManus, who was also working on the campaign, said to him, "I've got to get the message to Los Angeles, under no circumstances should Bobby go through that kitchen ... there's usually grease on the floor. He's going to fall or something."

Salinger, devastated by the assassination, moved to France and was a correspondent for the weekly news magazine L'Express.

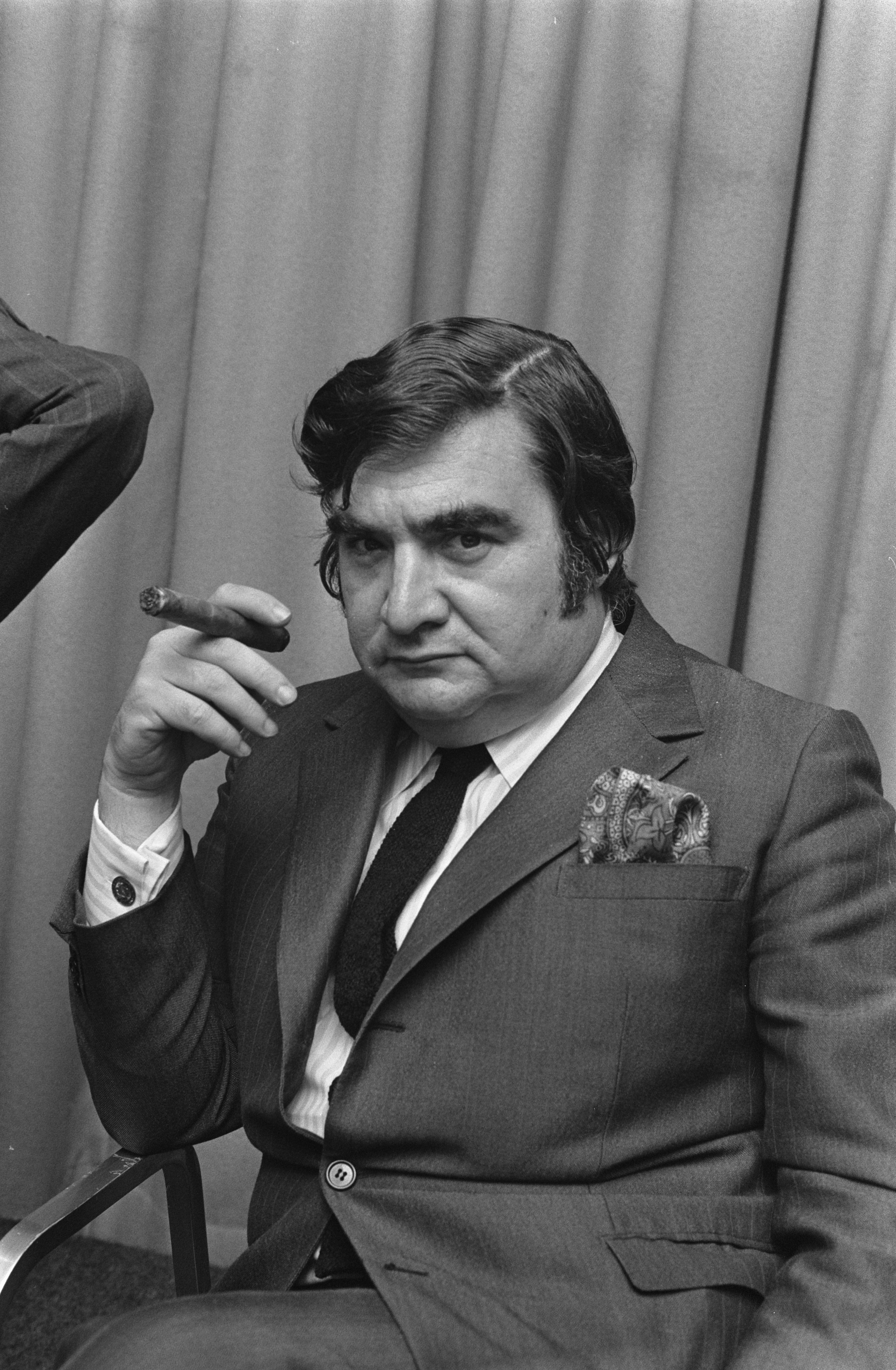
Salinger at a GRAMCO press conference in Amsterdam, July 3, 1970

Later in 1968, he became director of Great America Management and Research Company (GRAMCO), a mutual investment fund in U.S. real estate aimed at foreigners.

== Radio ==
In 1978, Salinger took over Radio Caraïbes International with his friend, the French advertising pioneer Jacques Dauphin.

== Journalism for ABC ==
In 1976, ABC Sports employed Salinger as a features commentator for the network's coverage of the Olympic Winter Games in Innsbruck, Austria, and the Summer Games in Montreal, Quebec. In 1978, he was hired by ABC News as its Paris bureau chief. He became the network's chief European correspondent based in London in 1983 when Peter Jennings moved to New York to become sole anchor of ABC World News Tonight after the death of Frank Reynolds.

In 1981, Salinger was bestowed with a George Polk award for his scoop that the US government was secretly negotiating to free Americans held hostage by Iran.

Salinger provided commentary on the 1989 Tour de France for ABC Sports.

In the 1980s, he was well known as a member of Amiic (World Real Estate Investment Organization, Geneva), with François Spoerry, Paul-Loup Sulitzer and Jean-Pierre Thiollet. The organization was dissolved in 1997.

In a November 1989 report for ABC's Prime Time Live, Salinger claimed that Iran had paid Syria and Ahmed Jibril, the head of the Popular Front for the Liberation of Palestine-General Command (PFLP-GC), to carry out the Pan Am 103 bombing.

After the August 1990 Iraq invasion of Kuwait, ABC started work on a special program about the invasion. The network sent Salinger to the Middle East, where he obtained a transcript in Arabic of a conversation between Saddam Hussein and the US Ambassador to Iraq, April Glaspie. The ambassador told Saddam, "We have no opinion on your Arab-Arab conflicts", which was interpreted by some as giving Saddam the green light to invade Kuwait, which he did only days later.

== Claims about TWA Flight 800 ==
Three months after the explosion of TWA Flight 800, Salinger claimed to have received a document verifying conspiracy theories about the flight that it had been shot down by friendly fire, and that this had been covered up by the United States government. He claimed that an intelligence agent had sent him the document. What Salinger was touting was, in fact, a hoax document that had been circulating the internet for weeks prior, and which had been emailed to him by a former airline pilot. By lending his distinction and credibility to these conspiracy theories, Salinger helped to bolster them.

The term Pierre Salinger syndrome was coined in the years after this. This is a pejorative term describing someone possessing the belief that everything on the internet is factual.

== Later life ==
After leaving ABC in 1993, Salinger moved back to Washington and became an executive with Burson-Marsteller, a public relations firm.

In November 2000, he became exasperated when he was denied permission to give exonerating evidence as part of his testimony before the Scottish Court in the Netherlands trying two Libyans for the December 21, 1988, bombing of Pan Am 103 over Lockerbie, Scotland. Salinger stated that he knew who the real bombers were, but was told by trial judge Ranald Sutherland, Lord Sutherland, "If you wish to make a point you may do so elsewhere, but I'm afraid you may not do so in this court."

During the 2000 United States presidential election, Salinger said that he would permanently move to France if George W. Bush won, and fulfilled this promise after Bush's victory. He died from heart failure at the age of 79 on October 16, 2004, at a hospital in Cavaillon, near his home, La Bastide Rose, in Le Thor. He is interred in Arlington National Cemetery.

== Bibliography ==
- A Tribute to John F. Kennedy (editor, with Sander Vanocur), 1964
- With Kennedy (1966)
- An Honorable Profession: A Tribute to Robert F. Kennedy (editor with Edwin Guthman, Frank Mankiewicz, and John Seigenthaler), 1968
- On Instructions of My Government, 1971
- Je Suis un Américain (I am an American), 1975
- La France et Le nouveau Monde, 1976
- Venezuelan Notebooks, 1979
- America Held Hostage: The Secret Negotiations, 1981
- Reporting U.S.-European Relations (with Michael Rice, Jonathan Carr, Henri Pierre, and Jan Reifenberg), 1982
- The Dossier (with Leonard Gross), 1984
- Above Paris: A New Collection of Aerial Photographs of Paris, France (author of text), 1984
- Mortal Games (co-author with Leonard Gross), 1988
- Secret Dossier: The Hidden Agenda Behind the Gulf War (co-author with Éric Laurent), 1991
- Tempete du Desert: Les Secrets de la Maison Blanche, 1991
- P.S., A Memoir, 1995
- John F. Kennedy, Commander in Chief: A Profile in Leadership, 1997
- Escape to Hell and Other Stories (foreword, collection authored by Muammar Gaddafi), 1998

== Notes ==
Political offices
Preceded by James Hagerty	White House Press Secretary; 1961–1964	Succeeded by George Reedy
U.S. Senate
Preceded by Clair Engle	United States Senator (Class 1) from California; 1964; Served alongside: Thomas Kuchel	Succeeded by George Murphy
Party political offices
Preceded by Clair Engle	Democratic nominee for U.S. Senator from California (Class 1); 1964	Succeeded by John V. Tunney
