= 1970 United States Senate election in California =

US Election

- November 3, 1970
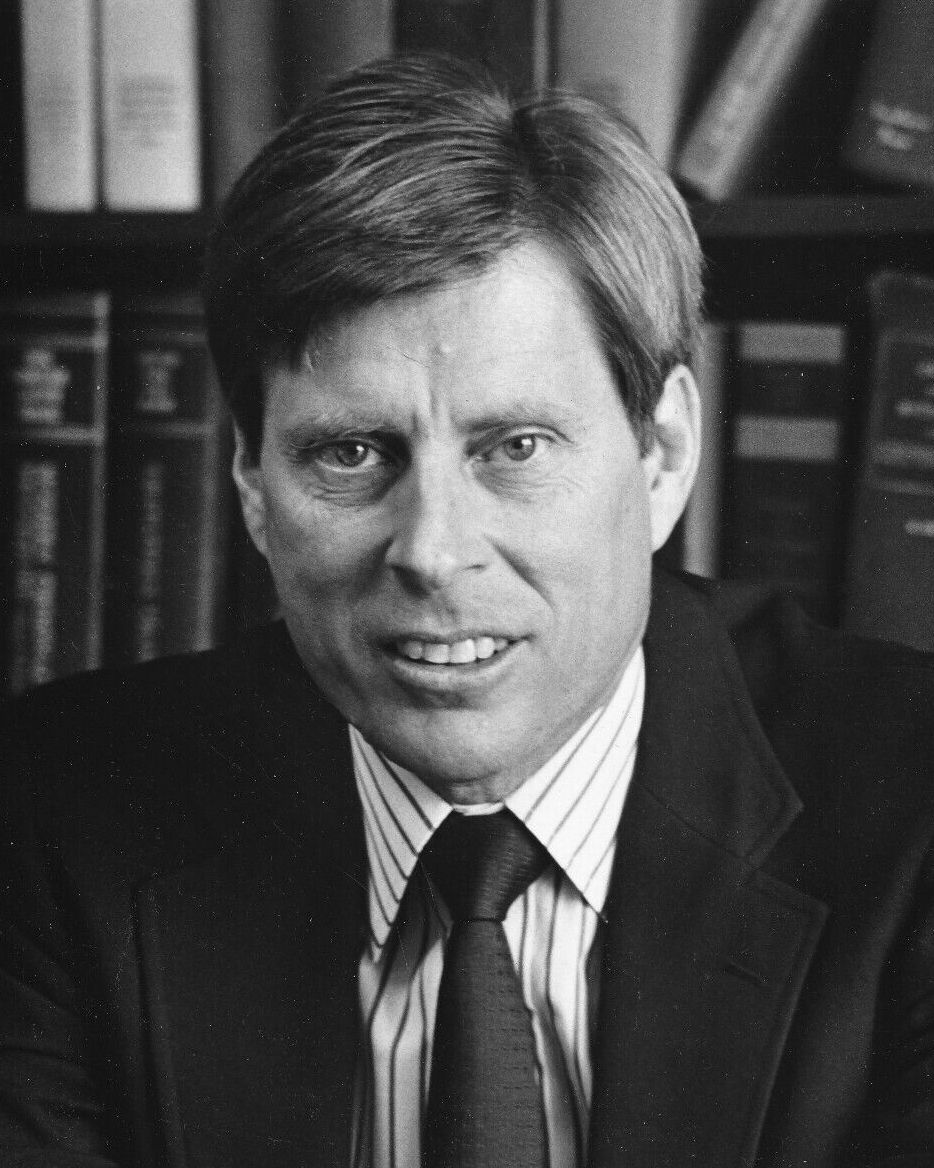

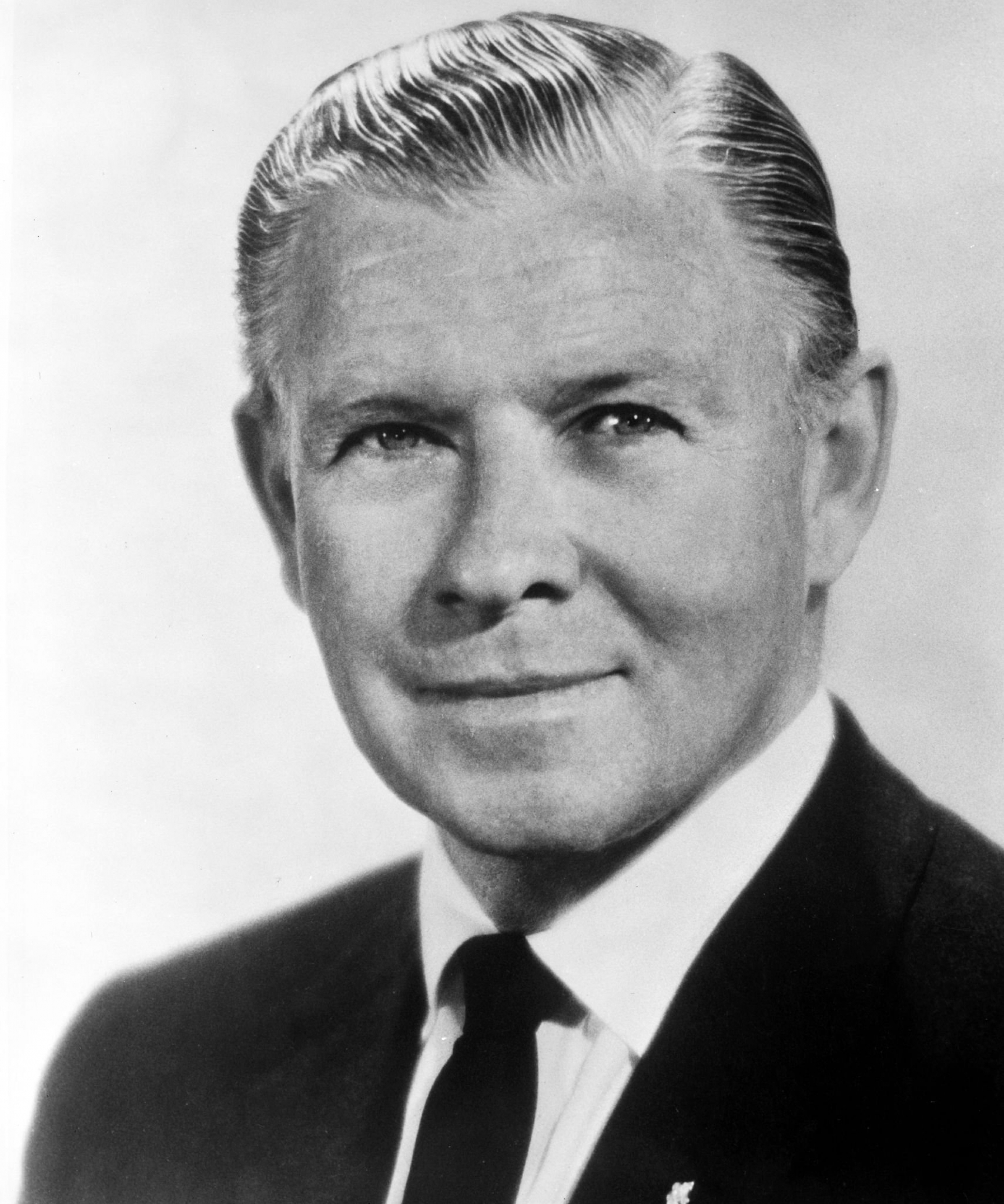
| Nominee | John V. Tunney | George Murphy |
| Party | Democratic | Republican |
| Popular vote | 3,496,558 | 2,877,617 |
| Percentage | 53.86% | 44.33% |
- County results Tunney: 40–50% 50–60% 60–70% Murphy: 40–50% 50–60%
U.S. senator before election
George Murphy
Republican
Elected U.S. Senator
John V. Tunney
Democratic

The 1970 United States Senate election in California was held on November 3, 1970.

Incumbent Republican Senator George Murphy lost re-election to a second term to Democratic Congressman John V. Tunney. After this election the Democrats ended up with both of the state's Senate seats, the first since 1860.

== Republican primary ==
=== Candidates ===
- Robert Amequista
- Robert R. Barry, former U.S. Representative from New York and unsuccessful candidate for Representative from California in 1966, 1967, and 1968
- Katharine Marros
- George Murphy, incumbent Senator
- Norton Simon, billionaire industrialist and philanthropist

=== Results ===
1970 Republican U.S. Senate primary
| Party | Candidate | Votes | % |
|---|---|---|---|
| Republican | George Murphy (incumbent) | 1,325,271 | 64.30% |
| Republican | Norton Simon | 670,702 | 32.54% |
| Republican | Robert R. Barry | 30,558 | 1.48% |
| Republican | Katharine Marros | 22,238 | 1.08% |
| Republican | Robert Amequista | 12,336 | 0.60% |
| Total votes | | 2,061,105 | 100.00 |

== Democratic primary ==
=== Candidates ===
- Eileen Anderson, candidate for Mayor of Los Angeles in 1969
- Arthur Bell Jr.
- George E. Brown Jr., U.S. Representative from Monterey Park
- Louis Di Salvo
- Kenneth Hahn, Los Angeles County Supervisor
- Leonard Kurland
- John V. Tunney, U.S. Representative from Riverside

=== Results ===
1970 Democratic U.S. Senate primary results
| Party | Candidate | Votes | % |
|---|---|---|---|
| Democratic | John V. Tunney | 1,010,812 | 41.58% |
| Democratic | George Brown Jr. | 812,463 | 33.42% |
| Democratic | Kenneth Hahn | 417,970 | 17.19% |
| Democratic | Eileen Anderson | 60,977 | 2.51% |
| Democratic | Arthur Bell Jr. | 48,878 | 2.01% |
| Democratic | Leonard Kurland | 43,923 | 1.81% |
| Democratic | Louis Di Salvo | 35,829 | 1.47% |
| Total votes | | 2,430,852 | 100.00 |

== General election ==
=== Candidates ===
- George Murphy, incumbent Senator since 1965 (Republican)
- Charles C. Ripley (American Independent)
- Robert Scheer, journalist (Peace and Freedom)
- John V. Tunney, U.S. Representative from Riverside (Democratic)

=== Results ===
General election results
| Party | Candidate | Votes | % | ±% |
|---|---|---|---|---|
| Democratic | John V. Tunney | 3,496,558 | 53.86% | ▲5.40 |
| Republican | George Murphy (incumbent) | 2,877,617 | 44.33% | ▼7.21 |
| American Independent | Charles C. Ripley | 61,251 | 0.94% | N/A |
| Peace and Freedom | Robert Scheer | 56,731 | 0.87% | N/A |
| Total votes | | 6,492,157 | 100.00 | |
| Democratic gain from Republican | | | | |

== See also ==
- 1970 United States Senate elections
