= 1964 United States Senate election in California =

- November 3, 1964
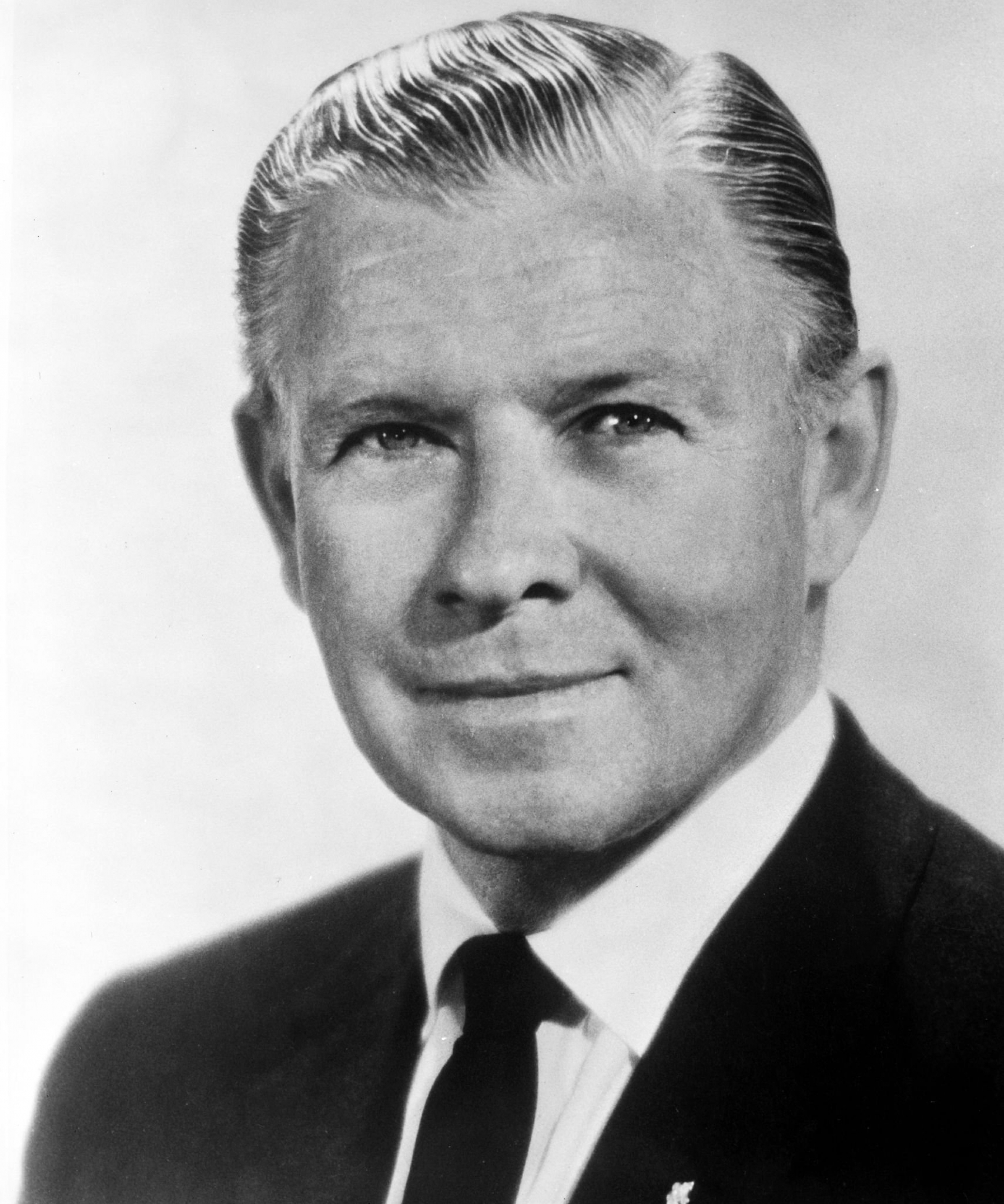

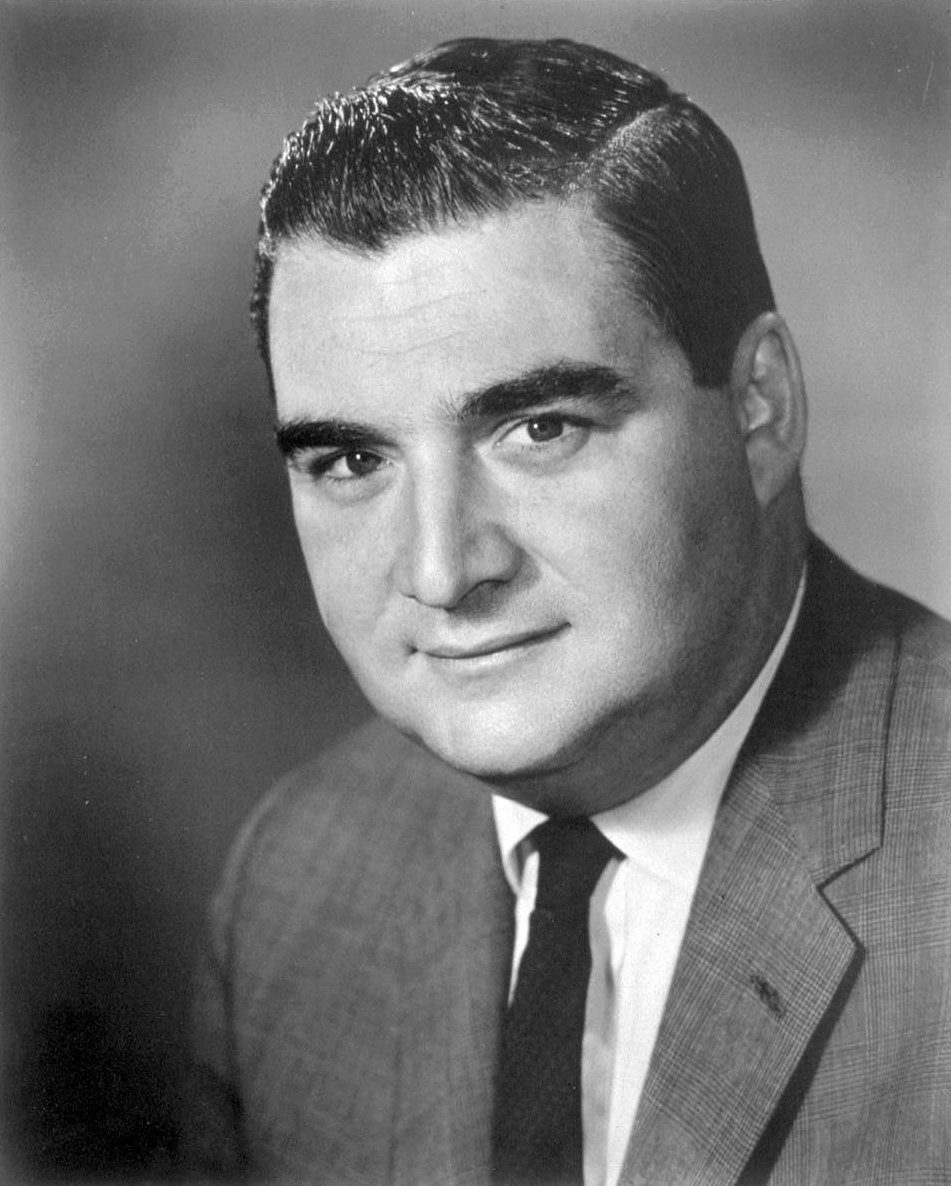
Nominee	George Murphy	Pierre Salinger
Party	Republican	Democratic
Popular vote	3,628,552	3,411,915
Percentage	51.54%	48.46%
- County results Murphy: 50–60% 60–70% Salinger: 50–60% 60–70%
U.S. senator before election
Pierre Salinger
Democratic
Elected U.S. Senator
George Murphy
Republican

The 1964 United States Senate election in California was held on November 3, 1964.

Incumbent Democratic Senator Clair Engle, who had been first elected in 1958, underwent surgery for a brain tumor in August 1963. Facing a primary challenge from Alan Cranston and deteriorating health, he withdrew from the race in April 1964. The primary election was won by Pierre Salinger, Press Secretary to President Lyndon Johnson. When Engle died in July, Salinger was appointed as interim senator in his place.

Salinger lost election to a full six-year term to Republican George Murphy, a retired Hollywood star. This was the only Senate seat Republicans gained in 1964.

== Democratic primary ==
=== Candidates ===
- Emanuel Braude
- Walter Buchanan, candidate for U.S. Representative in 1934 and 1962
- Demos Cordeiro
- Alan Cranston, California Controller
- Harold E. Fields
- Lynn Johnston, candidate for U.S. Representative in 1963
- George H. McLain, perennial candidate, nativist, and pensioner advocate
- Henry A. Mermel
- Mark Morris
- Guido Joseph Pavia, resident of Napa
- Pierre Salinger, White House Press Secretary

==== Declined to run ====
- Stanley Mosk, California Attorney General (appointed to California Supreme Court)

==== Withdrew ====
- Clair Engle, incumbent Senator (died July 30)

=== Campaign ===
On August 24, 1963, Senator Clair Engle underwent surgery to remove a brain tumor, which left him partially paralyzed, forcing him to miss several Senate sessions. Despite this, he was expected to recover and proceeded with his re-election campaign. By March 1964, California State Controller Alan Cranston had entered the race and received the endorsement of the California Democratic Council.

On April 13, 1964, Engle's illness was evident as he attempted to introduce a resolution to delay construction of the Bodega Bay Nuclear Power Plant. He was given permission to speak but was physically unable, and a colleague presented the resolution instead. Engle officially ended his re-election campaign on April 28, 1964, just four days after undergoing his second operation in eight months. He chose not to endorse either Cranston or Salinger.

A major point of contention during the primary and general elections was Salinger's eligibility to run. Though he was born in San Francisco and attended high school there, he was working at the White House at the time and officially a resident of Virginia, meaning he could not vote for himself.

=== Results ===
1964 Democratic U.S. Senate primary
Party	Candidate	Votes	%
Democratic	Pierre Salinger	1,177,517	44.26%
Democratic	Alan Cranston	1,037,748	39.01%
Democratic	George H. McLain	180,405	6.78%
Democratic	Clair Engle (incumbent) (withdrawn)	119,967	4.51%
Democratic	Lynn W. Johnston	43,744	1.64%
Democratic	Walter R. Buchanan	24,903	0.91%
Democratic	Guido Joseph Pavia	16,562	0.62%
Democratic	Harold E. Fields	16,061	0.60%
Democratic	Demos Cordeiro	15,696	0.59%
Democratic	Mark Morris	12,357	0.46%
Democratic	Emanuel Braude	10,064	0.38%
Democratic	Henry A. Mermel	6,092	0.23%
Total votes		2,660,306	100.00%

== Republican primary ==
=== Candidates ===
- Fred Hall, former Governor of Kansas
- Leland M. Kaiser, San Francisco financier
- George Murphy, actor, film executive, and former President of the Screen Actors Guild

=== Campaign ===
At the California Republican Assembly convention in March, which was overwhelmingly attended by supporters of Barry Goldwater, Murphy was endorsed over Kaiser. During the convention, former Governor of Kansas Fred Hall entered the race, denouncing the influence of the John Birch Society and "the ultra-right wing of the conservatives." Both Kaiser and Murphy were regarded as conservative, Goldwater-friendly candidates, while Hall was a moderate who identified as "a Rockefeller candidate."

=== Results ===
1964 Republican U.S. Senate primary
Party	Candidate	Votes	%
Republican	George Murphy	1,121,591	54.13%
Republican	Leland M. Kaiser	689,323	33.27%
Republican	Fred Hall	261,036	12.60%
Total votes		2,071,950	100.00%

== General election ==
=== Results ===
General election results
Party	Candidate	Votes	%	±%
Republican	George Murphy	3,628,552	51.54%	▲8.61
Democratic	Pierre Salinger (incumbent)	3,411,915	48.46%	▼8.55
Total votes		7,040,467	100.00	

== See also ==
- 1964 United States Senate elections
