= George Reedy =

White House Press Secretary (1917–1999)

- Reedy in 1965

10th White House Press Secretary
- In office March 19, 1964 – July 8, 1965
- President: Lyndon B. Johnson
- Preceded by: Pierre Salinger
- Succeeded by: Bill Moyers

Personal details
- Born: George Edward Reedy; August 5, 1917 East Chicago, Indiana, U.S.
- Died: March 21, 1999 (aged 81) Milwaukee, Wisconsin, U.S.
- Party: Democratic
- Education: University of Chicago (BA)

George Edward Reedy (August 5, 1917 – March 21, 1999) was the 10th White House press secretary from 1964 to 1965 under President Lyndon B. Johnson.

== Life and career ==
Born in East Chicago, Indiana, Reedy attended Senn High School in Chicago and graduated from the University of Chicago in 1938. Reedy was a reporter for the left-wing newspaper PM and for United Press in Washington, D.C. before joining Johnson's Senate staff in 1951. He worked as an aide to Johnson during his presidential campaign in 1960, his term as vice-president, and his early months as President. When Pierre Salinger resigned as press secretary in March 1964, Reedy was named to the position.

During the escalation of the American involvement in Vietnam beginning in March 1965, press questions over the veracity of the Johnson Administration's public assessments of the war led to charges of a so-called credibility gap. In 1965 Reedy took a leave of absence over his disagreement with Johnson's Vietnam policies. In 1968 he returned to the White House to work as a special assistant shortly before Johnson's surprise announcement that he would not seek reelection. After Johnson left office, Reedy started a supplementary newspaper serving South America and published The Twilight of the Presidency in 1970. The book was a critical and influential look at the modern American presidency and, in particular, at the impact that war has had on the office. While the book was not specifically critical of Johnson, the former president was reportedly unhappy with its frank assessment of the presidency and refused to speak with Reedy ever again. Early in his post-Watergate presidency, Gerald Ford asked his White House staff to read it.

In 1972 Reedy accepted an appointment as professor and dean of the journalism school at Marquette University. Reedy resigned as dean in 1976, but continued as Lucius W. Nieman Professor of Journalism (1977–1990) and Professor Emeritus (1991–1996).

Reedy was married to fellow journalist Lillian Greenwald from 1948 until her death in 1984. He was married to Ruth Wissman from 1988 until his death in Milwaukee in 1999.

== Works ==
- The Twilight of the Presidency: An Examination of Power and Isolation in the White House (1970, rev. 1987) ISBN 0-453-00567-5
- The Presidency in Flux (1973) ISBN 0-231-03736-8
- Lyndon B. Johnson: A Memoir (1982) ISBN 0-8362-6610-2
- The U.S. Senate: Paralysis, or a Search for Consensus? (1986) ISBN 0-517-56239-1
- From the Ward to the White House: The Irish in American Politics (1991) ISBN 0-684-18977-1

Political offices
Preceded by Pierre Salinger	White House Press Secretary; 1964–1965	Succeeded by Bill Moyers
