= George Murphy =

American actor and politician (1902–1992)

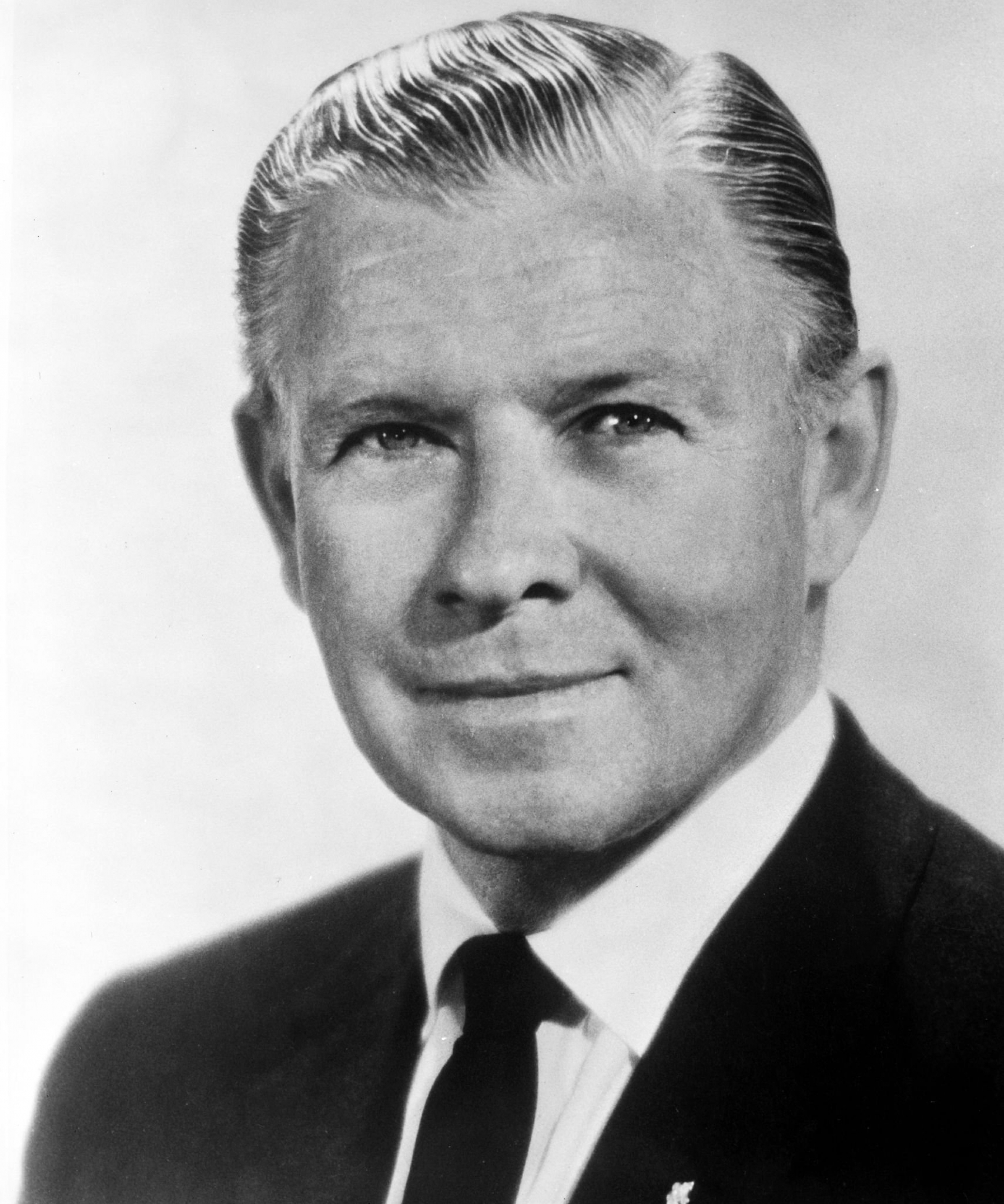
- Official portrait, 1964

United States Senator from California
- In office January 1, 1965 – January 1, 1971
- Preceded by: Pierre Salinger
- Succeeded by: John V. Tunney

President of the Screen Actors Guild
- In office 1944–1946
- Preceded by: James Cagney
- Succeeded by: Robert Montgomery

Personal details
- Born: George Lloyd Murphy; July 4, 1902 New Haven, Connecticut, U.S.
- Died: May 3, 1992 (aged 89) Palm Beach, Florida, U.S.
- Party: Republican
- Spouses: Julie Henkel-Johnson (m. 1926; died 1973) Betty Duhon Blandi (m. 1982)
- Children: 2
- Parent: Mike Murphy (father)
- Education: Yale University (BA)
- Occupation: Actor; politician

George Lloyd Murphy (July 4, 1902 – May 3, 1992) was an American actor and politician. Murphy was a song-and-dance leading man in many big-budget Hollywood musicals from 1930 to 1952. He was the president of the Screen Actors Guild from 1944 to 1946, and was awarded an honorary Oscar in 1951. Murphy served from 1965 to 1971 as U.S. Senator from California, the first notable American actor to be elected to statewide office in California, predating Ronald Reagan and Arnold Schwarzenegger, who each served two terms as governor. He is the only United States senator represented by a star on the Hollywood Walk of Fame.

== Early life ==
Murphy was born in New Haven, Connecticut, of Irish Catholic extraction, the son of Michael Charles "Mike" Murphy, athletic trainer and coach, and the former Nora Long. He was educated at Trinity-Pawling School, Peddie School and Yale University in his native New Haven.

== Film career ==
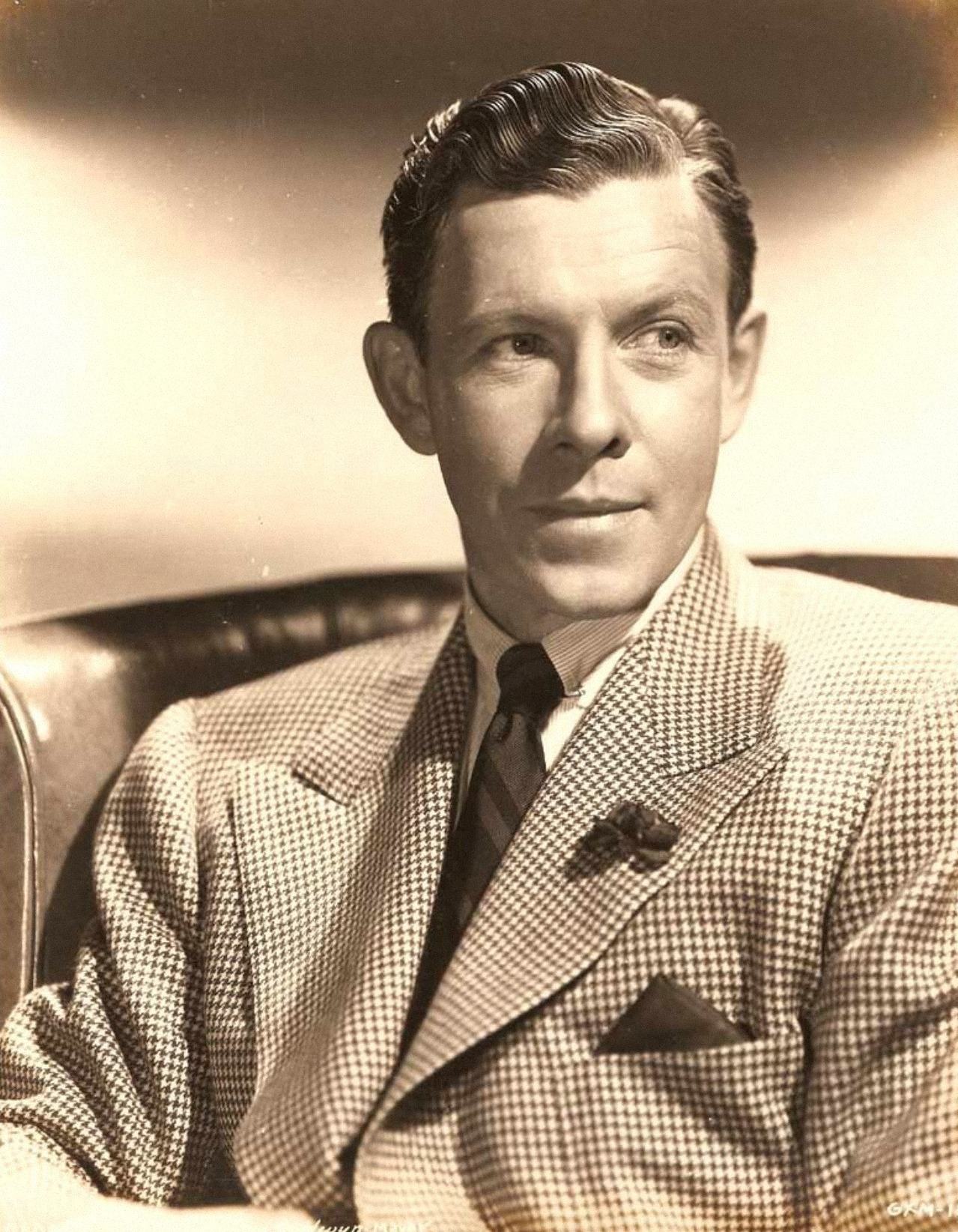
George Murphy as an actor c. 1930s.

In movies, Murphy was known as a song-and-dance man and appeared in many big-budget musicals such as Broadway Melody of 1938 (1937), Broadway Melody of 1940 (1940) and For Me and My Gal (1942). He made his movie debut shortly after talking pictures had replaced silent movies in 1930, and his career continued until he retired as an actor in 1952, at the age of 50. During World War II, he organized entertainment for American troops.

In 1951, he was awarded an honorary Academy Award. He was never nominated for an Oscar in any competitive category. On March 14, 1951, he hosted the first ever Eddie Awards for American Cinema Editors.

He was the president of the Screen Actors Guild from 1944 to 1946. He was also a vice president of Desilu Productions and of the Technicolor Corporation. He was director of entertainment for presidential inaugurations in 1953, 1957 and 1961.

== U.S. Senate ==
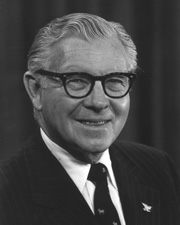
Murphy while serving as U.S. Senator.

Murphy entered politics in 1952 by joining the leadership of the California Republican Party, having also directed the entertainment for the Eisenhower-Nixon inauguration that same year.

In 1964, he was elected as a Republican to the Senate, having defeated Pierre Salinger, the former presidential press secretary in the Kennedy White House, who had been appointed several months earlier to serve the remainder of the late Clair Engle's unexpired term. Murphy served from January 1, 1965, to January 1, 1971. He took his seat two days early, when Salinger resigned to allow Murphy to gain an edge in seniority; Murphy was then appointed by Democratic Governor Pat Brown to serve the remaining two days of Salinger's term. (In turn, Murphy resigned two days before his term expired, extending the same courtesy to his successor.)

Murphy was in demand for a time to assist other Republican candidates seeking office. In 1966, he hosted a fundraising dinner in Atlanta, for U.S. Representative Howard "Bo" Callaway, the first Republican candidate for Governor of Georgia since Reconstruction. In the election, Callaway outpolled Democrat Lester Maddox, but did not get a majority, and the state legislature elected Maddox.

In 1967 and 1968, Murphy was the chairman of the National Republican Senatorial Committee. During his Senate term, Murphy developed throat cancer, and part of his larynx had to be removed. For the rest of his life, he was unable to speak above a whisper.

Murphy voted in favor of the Voting Rights Act of 1965, as well as the Civil Rights Act of 1968.

In 1970, Murphy ran for re-election; he was challenged by Democrat John V. Tunney. Murphy's surgery and staunch support for the lingering Vietnam War worked against him, as did reports that he had continued to receive a salary from Technicolor after taking office. Despite Governor Ronald Reagan’s re-election victory (by 7%) in the concurrent gubernatorial election. Murphy lost his seat to Tunney by 618,941 votes. Tunney's successful Senate race in 1970 was reportedly the inspiration for the 1972 Robert Redford film The Candidate.

== Personal life and death ==
Murphy was married to his ballroom dancing partner, Juliette "Julie" Henkel-Johnson, from December 18, 1926, until her death, in 1973. They had two children: Dennis Michael Murphy and Melissa Elaine Murphy.

He was married to Bette Blandi from 1982 until his death in 1992; she died in 1999.

Murphy subsequently moved to Palm Beach, Florida, where he died at the age of 89, from leukemia.

== Legacy ==
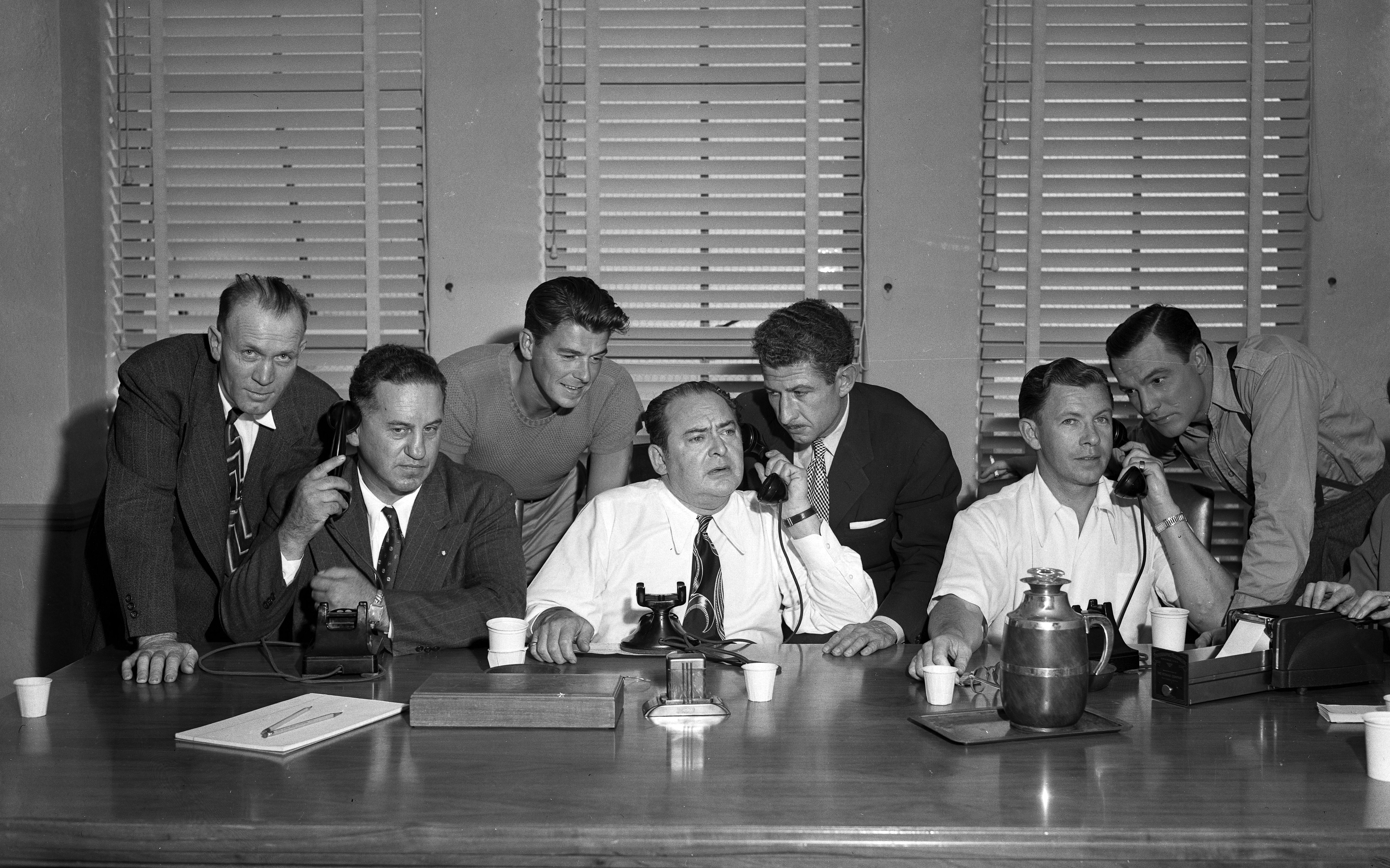
Seven actors and studio workers during a telephone conference held in the aftermath of Hollywood Black Friday in which American Federation of Labor officials denied issuing a "clarification" which set off the film strike, October 26, 1946. (L-R): James Skelton, Herbert Sorrell, Ronald Reagan, Edward Arnold, Roy Tindall, George Murphy, and Gene Kelly.

Murphy's move from the screen to California politics paved the way for the successful transitions of actors such as Ronald Reagan and later Arnold Schwarzenegger. Reagan once famously referred to George Murphy as his own "John the Baptist".

Fellow Republicans praised Murphy's ability to speak at fundraising dinners and so consequently backed his bid to become the chairman of the Senate Republican Campaign Committee.

During his tenure in the Senate, Murphy created the candy desk by placing a supply of confectionery on his desk on the U.S. Senate floor. After 1971, the candy-desk duties were bequeathed to a string of successors; as of 2026, the keeper of the candy desk is Oklahoma Republican Alan Armstrong.

Murphy was the subject of a song by Tom Lehrer included on his album That Was the Year That Was with the same name, which criticized Murphy's comments about Mexicans working in the US.

== Filmography ==
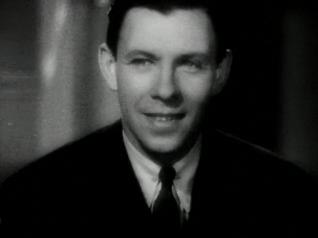
Murphy in the film London by Night (1937).

- Kid Millions (1934) as Jerry Lane
- Jealousy (1934) as Larry O'Roarke
- I'll Love You Always (1935) as Carl Brent
- After the Dance (1935) as Jerry Davis
- The Public Menace (1935) as Edward Joseph 'Red' Foster
- Woman Trap (1936) as Keat Shevlin
- Top of the Town (1937) as Ted Lane
- London by Night (1937) as Michael Denis
- Broadway Melody of 1938 (1937) as Sonny Ledford
- The Women Men Marry (1937) as Bill Raeburn
- You're a Sweetheart (1937) as Hal Adams
- Little Miss Broadway (1938) as Roger Wendling
- Letter of Introduction (1938) as Barry Paige
- Hold That Co-ed (1938) as Rusty
- Risky Business (1939) as Dan Clifford
- Broadway Melody of 1940 (1940) as King Shaw
- Two Girls on Broadway (1940) as Eddie Kerns
- Public Deb No. 1 (1940) as Alan Blake
- Little Nellie Kelly (1940) as Jerry Kelly
- A Girl, a Guy, and a Gob (1941) as Coffee Cup
- Tom, Dick and Harry (1941) as Tom
- Ringside Maisie (1941) as Skeets Maguire
- Rise and Shine (1941) as Mo McGonigle
- The Mayor of 44th Street (1942) as Joe Jonathan
- For Me and My Gal (1942) as Jimmy Metcalf
- The Navy Comes Through (1942) as Lt. Thomas L. 'Tom' Sands
- The Powers Girl (1943) as Jerry Hendricks
- Bataan (1943) as Lieut. Steve Bentley
- This Is the Army (1943) as Jerry Jones
- Broadway Rhythm (1944) as Jonnie Demming
- Show Business (1944) as George Doane
- Step Lively (1944) as Gordon Miller
- Having Wonderful Crime (1945) as Jake Justus
- Up Goes Maisie (1946) as Joseph Morton
- The Arnelo Affair (1947) as Theodore 'Ted' Parkson
- Cynthia (1947) as Larry Bishop
- Tenth Avenue Angel (1948) as Steve Abbutt
- Big City (1948) as Patrick O'Donnell
- Border Incident (1949) as Jack Bearnes
- Battleground (1949) as 'Pop' Stazak
- No Questions Asked (1951) as Inspector Matt Duggan
- It's a Big Country (1951) as Mr. Callaghan
- Talk About a Stranger (1952) as Robert Fontaine Sr.
- Walk East on Beacon (1952) as Inspector James 'Jim' Belden
- Deep in My Heart (1954) (scenes deleted)

== Radio ==
- Suspense (episode "Death on Highway 99," 1945)
- Lux Radio Theatre (episode Royal Wedding, 1952)

== Television ==
- New Comedy Showcase (episode "You're Only Young Twice," 1960)

Party political offices
Preceded by Goodwin Knight	Republican nominee for U.S. Senator from California (Class 1); 1964, 1970	Succeeded by S. I. Hayakawa
Preceded by Thruston Ballard Morton	Chair of the National Republican Senatorial Committee; 1967–1969	Succeeded by John Tower
Preceded by Everett Dirksen; Gerald Ford	Response to the State of the Union address 1968; Served alongside: Howard Baker, George H. W. Bush, Peter Dominick, Gerald Ford, Robert Griffin, Thomas Kuchel, Mel Laird, Bob Mathias, Dick Poff, Chuck Percy, Al Quie, Charlotte Reid, Hugh Scott, Bill Steiger, John Tower	Vacant Title next held by Donald Fraser, Scoop Jackson, Mike Mansfield, John McCormack, Patsy Mink, Ed Muskie, Bill Proxmire
U.S. Senate
Preceded by Pierre Salinger	U.S. Senator (Class 1) from California; 1965–1971; Served alongside: Thomas Kuchel, Alan Cranston	Succeeded by John V. Tunney
