= Jeremy Larner =

American author, poet and journalist (1937–2026)

- Born: Jeremy David Larner; March 20, 1937; Olean, New York, U.S.
- Died: February 24, 2026 (aged 88); Oakland, California, U.S.
- Occupations: Author, poet, journalist, speechwriter
- Notable work: The Candidate

Jeremy David Larner (March 20, 1937 – February 24, 2026) was an American author, poet, journalist, and speechwriter. He won an Oscar in 1973 for Best Original Screenplay, for writing The Candidate.

== Early life and education ==
Jeremy Larner was born in Olean, New York, on March 20, 1937, and grew up in Indianapolis, winning his high school tennis championship in 1954. He had some playground rep as a basketball player in Indianapolis, where he encountered Oscar Robertson and other future stars on the playground courts of that city.

Larner graduated from Brandeis University in 1958, where he was close to Herbert Marcuse, Irving Howe, Philip Rahv, and a fellow student named Abbie Hoffman, who later, running a small bookstore in Worcester, Massachusetts, became an early champion of Larner's first novel.

== Early career ==
In 1959, Larner began a Woodrow Wilson Fellowship at UC Berkeley, but finding himself unsuited for academic life he left graduate school in his first year and came to New York City at 22. He stayed there throughout the 1960s, writing five books in that period.

In 1962, Larner was assigned by Dissent magazine to cover the teachers' strike, and spent several months going to elementary school classes in Harlem. His long account of what he discovered was widely anthologized, having come to the attention of Michael Harrington, author of The Other America: Poverty in the United States, which inspired John F. Kennedy and Robert F. Kennedy.

Larner's first published piece was a critique of J. D. Salinger, published in Partisan Review in 1961. Also in that year he journeyed south to cover the lunch-counter sit-in strikes organized at black universities, and wrote several pieces for The New Leader and Dissent.

In 1963, Larner edited a taped collection of interviews with heroin addicts at the Henry Street Settlement in New York. The harrowing stories told in these interviews became the basis of one of the first books from tape: The Addict in the Street, which remained in print for 20 years. Grove Press celebrated its publication in early 1965 with a party for Larner and William S. Burroughs, where Norman Mailer challenged Larner to a fight.

== First novel, Drive, He Said; writing prizes ==
Larner's first novel, Drive, He Said, won the Delta Prize for first novels in 1964. The prize had gone unclaimed for several years and by then had reached $10,000. The judges were Walter Van Tilburg Clark, Mary McCarthy and Leslie Fiedler. For the title of this novel, Larner chose a line from the poem I Know a Man by Robert Creeley.

The heroes of Drive, He Said were a college basketball star who has mixed feelings about his stardom and what is expected of him and his revolutionary roommate, who eventually burns the campus down. The reviewer in Playboy magazine echoed the establishment verdict when he said, "Nothing like this could happen in America."

In 1965, Larner won the Aga Khan Prize for the best short story published in The Paris Review that year, "O, the Wonder!"

== Journalism ==
After 1964, Larner worked as a freelance journalist and published articles, essays and stories in many magazines, including Harpers, The Paris Review, and Life.

Larner reported on the trial of Dale Noyd, a decorated fighter pilot who had refused to train other pilots for the war in Vietnam. The account, which ran in Harper's, was selected for an anthology of the best journalism of the year.

== Academics ==
In 1965, Larner began teaching in the English department at Stony Brook, State University of New York, although he had no degrees beyond the B.A. He taught classes in poetry and in the modern novel from 1965 through 1969, taking the year off in 1968, when he won an N.E.A. grant in the first year they were given to individual artists. He would later teach, for one year, at the John F. Kennedy School of Government at Harvard University.

== Eugene McCarthy campaign, 1968 ==
In March 1968, Larner became a principal speechwriter for Eugene McCarthy in his campaign for President. Afterwards Larner wrote a book, Nobody Knows, about his travels with the McCarthy campaign, and most of it was serialized in Harpers Magazine in April and May 1969. This book got good reviews and was widely read by many who participated in the campaign and wondered what happened to McCarthy after the assassination of Robert Kennedy.

In a wide-ranging interview, given in 2016, Larner spoke about his experiences writing for McCarthy, and how that influenced his script for The Candidate:

"I thought a campaign was like drifting downriver on a raft, where everything is beautiful: then you begin to hear the roar of the falls up ahead, but it’s too late. You go over the falls, you lose yourself, you become eternally confused by the difference between yourself and who your public thinks you are. And it's a disarming, dissociative experience. And Redford played that very well: the better McKay gets at campaigning, the more he loses himself."

== Drive, He Said: The movie ==
In 1971, Drive, He Said, was made into a movie directed by Jack Nicholson, who collaborated with Larner on the screenplay. This film constituted Nicholson's directorial debut and is available as part of the Criterion edition "America Lost and Found: The BBS Story."

== Vietnam peace movement ==
Larner continued his work with the peace movement in 1969. During the Moratorium which mobilized hundreds of thousands of people around the country, he wrote speeches for Sam Brown, the chief organizer and spokesperson of the Moratorium, and also for Paul Newman, who gave a statement on behalf of several actors who were advocating that war protesters miss a day of work.

During this time and afterwards, Larner spoke at many college campuses, first in behalf of the anti-Vietnam-war movement, later on movies and politics. He has spoken at one hundred universities around the country.

== The Candidate ==
In April 1971, Larner wrote a documentary-style script for a feature film directed by Michael Ritchie and starring Robert Redford about a campaign for senator from California. The Candidate was released during the election of 1972, and was critically acclaimed; the film holds a score of 89% on Rotten Tomatoes based on 36 critical reviews.

In 1973, Larner won an Oscar for Best Original Screenplay for his script for The Candidate. Some politicians, like Dan Quayle, did not seem to realize the movie was ironic. Quayle spoke frequently about how the movie had inspired him, causing Larner, during the 1988 elections, to write an op-ed for The New York Times, saying, "Sorry, Senator Quayle, you thought we were telling you 'how-to,' when we were trying to say: watch out. You missed the irony. Unless, in a way I never could have foreseen, you are the irony."

During this time, Larner occasionally wrote speeches for politicians, like Bill Bradley, when he gave his basic position on Israel, or stars like Robert Redford, when he spoke in behalf of environmentalism.

== Later work ==
In 1987, Larner began to write poetry, and in 1989 began to have public readings. In 1992, he wrote a long story, titled "Rack's Rules", the only piece of fiction in an anthology titled Sex, Death & God in Los Angeles. After losing his home in the 1991 Oakland Hills fire, he contributed an article to Fire in the Hills, a compilation of responses to the fire, and became a regular contributor to New Choices magazine.

== Sleep apnea ==
Larner moved back to New York City in the 1990s, where he reached a point of severe disorientation before being diagnosed with sleep apnea, and wrote an article about the condition (not diagnosed or treatable until the 1980s) and his experience of it, that caused many people to recognize and recover completely from a state that otherwise can lead to sudden death.

== Chicken on Church ==
It was in New York that Larner was inspired to write Chicken on Church, both a mock-epic and a love poem to the city, particularly to the neighborhood on the end of Manhattan Island. It has been described as Whitmanesque, but full of specific detail and classical allusions.

Larner first wrote the poem in 1992 and has revised it frequently since then. "Chicken on Church" and selected other poems have recently been published by Big Rooster Press.

== Later life and death ==
Larner was diagnosed with Parkinson's disease in 2013. He died in Oakland, California, on February 24, 2026, at the age of 88, one month after being diagnosed with lymphoma.
