= Tunney Act =

1974 U.S. antitrust legislation

Antitrust Procedures and Penalties Act (APPA)
- Other short titles: APPA
- Long title: An act to reform consent decree procedures, to increase penalties for violation of the Sherman Act, and to revise the Expediting Act as it pertains to Appellate Review
- Nicknames: Tunney Act
- Enacted by: the 93rd United States Congress

The Tunney Act, officially known as the Antitrust Procedures and Penalties Act (Pub. L. 93–528, 88 Stat. 1708, enacted December 21, 1974, 15 U.S.C. § 16), is antitrust legislation passed in the United States in 1974.

Submitted by John V. Tunney, the law has as its main point the court review of Justice Department decisions regarding mergers and acquisitions, including settlements. It has been referred to in the AT&T actions with regards to SBC and BellSouth, along with the acquisition of Sprint by T-Mobile proposed in 2018. The need for settlements to be approved by a judge is considered to be a protection from corruption.
