= Harkness (surname) =

Harkness is a Scottish surname. Its etymology is probably from the Old English personal name Hereca (a derivative of the various compound names with the first element here army) plus the Old English næss headland, cape.

Notable people and characters with the surname include:

== People ==
- Albert Harkness (1822–1907), American classical scholar and educator
- Alistair Harkness (born 1974), Australian politician
- Angela Harkness (born 1976), Iranian scam artist
- Anna M. Harkness (1837–1926), American philanthropist
- Charles W. Harkness (1860–1916), American Standard Oil heir
- Daniel Harkness, American author, professor, and social worker
- Daniel M. Harkness (1822–1896), American businessman and early Standard Oil investor
- David Harkness (born 1965), American tennis player
- Deborah Harkness (born 1965), American author and historian
- Donald Harkness (1931–2021), Australian cricketer
- Douglas Harkness (1903–1999), Canadian politician
- Edward Harkness (1874–1940), American philanthropist
- Georgia Harkness (1891–1974), American Methodist theologian and philosopher
- H. W. Harkness (1821–1901), American mycologist and natural historian
- Harry Harkness (1880–1919), American racing driver, aviator, and playboy
- Hilary Harkness (born 1971), American painter
- Jack Harkness (disambiguation), various people
- James Harkness (disambiguation), various people
- Jerry Harkness (1940–2021), American basketball player
- Joe Harkness (1986–2026), British mental health activist, naturalist and writer
- John Harkness (disambiguation), various people
- Jonny Harkness (born 1985), Northern Irish footballer
- Joseph Harkness (1850–1930), New Zealand politician
- Kenneth Harkness (1896–1972), American chess organizer
- Kenneth M. Harkness (1899–1988), American football coach, college professor, and researcher
- Lamon V. Harkness (1850–1915), American businessman, Standard Oil heir, and horse breeder
- Margaret Harkness (1854–1923), English radical journalist and writer
- Mary Lou Harkness (1925–2014), American librarian
- Nancy Harkness Love (1914–1976), American pilot
- Ned Harkness (1919–2008), Canadian-American lacrosse and ice hockey coach
- Peter Harkness (born 1949), British media entrepreneur and investor
- Piper Harkness (born 2002), Canadian volleyball player
- Rebekah Harkness (1915–1982), American composer, socialite, sculptor, dance patron, and philanthropist
- Richard Harkness (1907–1977), American journalist
- Robert Harkness (1816–1878), British geologist and mineralogist
- Ruth Harkness (1900–1947), American fashion designer and socialite
- Sarah P. Harkness (1914–2013), American architect
- Spec Harkness (1887–1952), American baseball player
- Stephen V. Harkness (1818–1888), American businessman and partner of John D. Rockefeller
- Steve Harkness (born 1971), English footballer
- Tim Harkness (1937–2025), Canadian baseball player
- Tim Harkness (American football) (born 1955), American football coach and former player
- Timandra Harkness, British writer, presenter and comedian
- William Harkness (1837–1903), Scottish-American Civil War surgeon and astronomer
- William L. Harkness (1858–1919), American businessman and Standard Oil heir

== Fictional characters ==
- Agatha Harkness, a witch in the Marvel Comics universe
- Gary Harkness, in Endzone, novel by Don DeLillo
- George "Digger" Harkness aka Captain Boomerang, a supervillain from the DC Comics universe
- Harkness, Rivet City security officer in the video game Fallout 3
- Captain Harkness, captain of the torchship Mayflower in Farmer in the Sky, by Robert A. Heinlein
- Horace Harkness, a naval petty officer and later warrant officer in the 'Honorverse'
- Captain Jack Harkness, one of the main protagonists in the fictional television series Torchwood and a companion of the television series Doctor Who
- Frank Harkness, a former CIA operative turned ruthless mercenary in Series 4 of Slow Horses. He is later revealed to be River Cartwright's biological father.
- Richard Harkness, walker #49 who is an aspiring journalist in The Long Walk (2025 film) by Stephen King played by Jordan Gonzalez.
- Professor Harkness, Betty Harkness, Kelly Harkness: characters in the Marvel/Hanna Barberra cartoon "The Thing".
