= Outpatient Treatment of Alcoholism =

1980 American nonfiction book

- Author: Jeffery Brandsma, Maxie C. Maultsby & Richard J. Welsh
- Language: English
- Subject: Alcoholism, alcoholism treatment
- Publisher: University Park Press
- Publication date: 1980
- Publication place: United States
- ISBN: 0839113935

Outpatient Treatment of Alcoholism is a book by Jeffery Brandsma, Maxie C. Maultsby Jr., and Richard J. Welsh, published in 1980. It describes a study of 260 individuals, 184 referred by the courts and 76 self-referred or referred by other agencies for 210 days. Participants were assigned randomly within five groups: AA-like meetings, RBT therapy administered by a non-professional, RBT therapy administered by degreed professionals, Insight Therapy administered by professionals, and a control group which received no treatment.

== Methodology ==
The AA treatment meeting was created by the research team, and was held at a rented office building set up to run the overall study. The meeting was open to the public, but it is unknown whether the meeting was listed in local AA directories. While initially run by two AA members with over 10 years of experience before the trial started, the AA meeting was led by a member of the group (who was not in the study) with no previous AA experience during the research trial. Even though the AA patients were encouraged to get a sponsor, almost none of them got one. Attendance records were kept; people with poor or no AA attendance were reminded by a social worker about the conditions of their parole. Brandsma noted that the AA group "did not develop a high degree of cohesiveness".

== Results ==
The study found that AA was more effective than no treatment, and about as effective as the three other alcoholism treatments. According to the study, both the AA-style and the lay-RBT group were able to stop drinking more often than the control group after one or two initial drinks, and when drinking, they both consumed three to four times less alcohol per day than the control group.

=== Increased binge drinking ===
While some people who went to the AA-like meetings indulged in binge drinking at the three-month after treatment mark, there was no increase in binge drinking for the AA-style meeting members six months, nine months, or one year after treatment; the finding that AA attenders had increased binge drinking has not been replicated in more recent studies. The fact that this study saw increased binge drinking has been noted in polemics critical of Alcoholics Anonymous.

== Criticism ==
There was no effort to stop the people in the control group from attending Alcoholics Anonymous meetings. The "Alcoholics Anonymous" treatment patients underwent in the Brandsma study did not use community Alcoholics Anonymous meetings; a later analysis says that there are "concerns with the Brandsma trial which call its experimental results into question" because "the control condition allowed for participation in actual AA meetings, while those in the AA condition attended a weekly AA-like meeting administered by the study (that was not an actual AA meeting)".

== Jeffrey Brandsma ==
Jeffrey Brandsma, born on December 14, 1943, was the principal author of this study. He got a Ph.D. in clinical psychology, and was at the University of Kentucky Medical College as an Associate Professor when this study and book were published. He moved to Augusta, Georgia in 1981, after this book came out. He died on February 19, 2008.
