= Albert Ellis =

American psychologist (1913–2007)

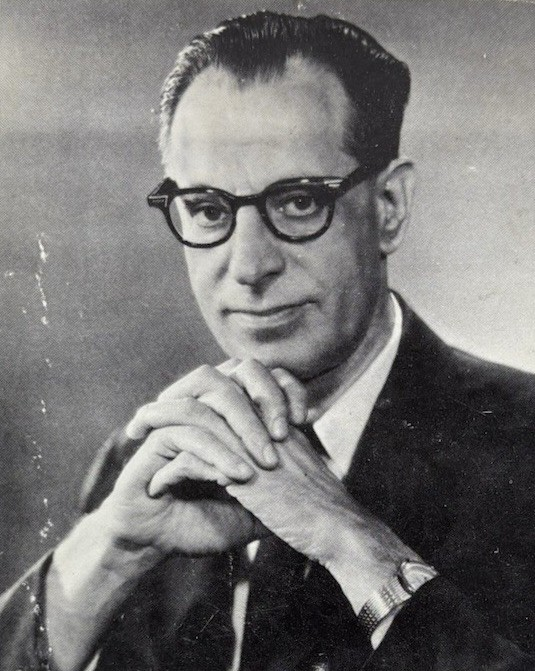
- Ellis c. 1966
- Born: September 27, 1913; Pittsburgh, Pennsylvania, U.S.
- Died: July 24, 2007 (aged 93); New York City, New York, U.S.
- Education: Baruch College (BA); Columbia University (MA, PhD)
- Known for: Formulating and developing rational emotive behavior therapy, cognitive behavioral therapy
- Scientific career
- Fields: Clinical psychology, philosophy, and psychotherapy

Albert Ellis (September 27, 1913 – July 24, 2007) was an American psychologist and psychotherapist who founded rational emotive behavior therapy (REBT). He held MA and PhD degrees in clinical psychology from Columbia University, and was certified by the American Board of Professional Psychology (ABPP). He also founded, and was the President of, the New York City-based Albert Ellis Institute. He is generally considered to be one of the originators of the cognitive revolutionary paradigm shift in psychotherapy and an early proponent and developer of cognitive-behavioral therapies.

Based on a 1982 professional survey of American and Canadian psychologists, he was considered the second most influential psychotherapist in history (Carl Rogers ranked first in the survey; Sigmund Freud was ranked third). Psychology Today noted that, "No individual—not even Freud himself—has had a greater impact on modern psychotherapy."

== Early life ==
Ellis was born in Pittsburgh, Pennsylvania, and raised in The Bronx borough of New York City from a young age. His paternal grandparents were Jewish immigrants from the Russian Empire, while his maternal grandfather originated from Galicia, Poland in Austria-Hungary. He was the eldest of three children. Ellis' father, Harry, was a broker, often away from home on business trips, who reportedly showed only a modicum of affection to his children. By his teenage years, his parents divorced, and he lived solely with his mother. His father never again played a significant part in his life.

In his autobiography, Ellis characterized his mother, Hattie, as a self-absorbed woman with a bipolar disorder. At times, according to Ellis, she was a "bustling chatterbox who never listened." She would expound on her strong opinions on most subjects, but rarely provided a factual basis for these views. Like his father, Ellis' mother was emotionally distant from her children. Ellis recounted that she was often sleeping when he left for school and usually not home when he returned. Instead of reporting feeling bitter, he took on the responsibility of caring for his siblings. He purchased an alarm clock with his own money and woke and dressed his younger brother and sister.

When the Great Depression struck, all three children sought work to assist the family. Ellis was sickly as a child and suffered numerous health problems throughout his youth. At the age of five he was hospitalized with a kidney disease. He was also hospitalized with tonsillitis, which led to a severe streptococcal infection requiring emergency surgery. He reported that he had eight hospitalizations between the ages of five and seven, one of which lasted nearly a year. His parents provided little emotional support for him during these years, rarely visiting or consoling him. Ellis stated that he learned to confront his adversities as he had "developed a growing indifference to that dereliction".

Ellis committed numerous sexual assaults against women during his teens and early twenties, writing that he became addicted to nonconsensual frotteurism at the age of fifteen, and claimed to have had “hundreds of frotteur-incited sex adventures” until his twenties. He reported that he "sought out crowded trains, standing rooms in the back of movie theaters, crowded elevators, and other places where I could rub my midsection against women's backsides and hips and soon get delicious orgasm,” stating that the encounters were “sometimes nonconsenting.” Ellis also wrote, “I am now, when I think about it, guilty about my acts. I have remorse for what I did,” adding that, “I deplore the sin and accept the sinner” but then went on to say “I knew that frotteurism was wrong – that it is sometimes nonconsenting” but “Subway sex was the cheapest and easiest sex I ever had, and I continued it into my twenties . . . . But in some ways it was great: no fuss, no obligations, no time wasted, no having to put up with the inane conversation of most women, no pregnancy, no disease, no boredom.”

Illness was to follow Ellis throughout his life; at age 40 he developed diabetes.

Ellis had exaggerated fears of speaking in public and during his adolescence, he was extremely shy around women. At age 19, already showing signs of thinking like a cognitive-behavioral therapist, he forced himself to talk to 100 women in the Bronx Botanical Gardens over a period of a month. Even though he did not get a date, he reported that he desensitized himself to his fear of rejection by women.

=== Education and early career ===
Ellis entered the field of clinical psychology after first earning a Bachelor of Arts degree in business from what was then known as the City College of New York Downtown in 1934. He began a brief career in business, followed by one as a writer. These endeavors took place during the Great Depression that began in 1929, and Ellis found that business was poor and had no success in publishing his fiction. Finding that he could write non-fiction well, Ellis researched and wrote on human sexuality. His lay counseling in this subject convinced him to seek a new career in clinical psychology.

In 1942, Ellis began his studies for a PhD in clinical psychology at Teachers College, Columbia University, which trained psychologists mostly in psychoanalysis. He completed his Master of Arts in clinical psychology from Teachers College in June 1943, and started a part-time private practice while still working on his PhD degree—possibly because there was no licensing of psychologists in New York at that time. Ellis began publishing articles even before receiving his PhD; in 1946 he wrote a critique of many widely used pencil-and-paper personality tests. He concluded that only the Minnesota Multiphasic Personality Inventory met the standards of a research-based instrument.

In 1947, he was awarded a PhD in Clinical Psychology at Columbia, and at that time Ellis had come to believe that psychoanalysis was the deepest and most effective form of therapy. Like most psychologists of that time, he was interested in the theories of Sigmund Freud. He sought additional training in psychoanalysis and then began to practice classical psychoanalysis. Shortly after receiving his PhD in 1947, Ellis began a Jungian analysis and program of supervision with Richard Hulbeck, a leading analyst at the Karen Horney Institute (whose own analyst had been Hermann Rorschach, the developer of the Rorschach inkblot test). At that time he taught at New York University, Rutgers University, and Pittsburg State University and held a couple of leading staff positions. At this time, Ellis' faith in psychoanalysis was gradually crumbling.

== Psychological career ==
=== Early theoretical contributions to psychotherapy ===
The writings of Karen Horney, Alfred Adler, Erich Fromm, and Harry Stack Sullivan would be some of the influences in Ellis's thinking and played a role in shaping his psychological models. Ellis credits Alfred Korzybski, his book, Science and Sanity, and general semantics for starting him on the philosophical path for founding rational therapy. In addition, modern and ancient philosophy (particularly stoicism), and his own experiences heavily influenced his new theoretical developments to psychotherapy. Ellis acknowledged that his therapy was "by no means entirely new", as in particular Paul Charles Dubois's "rational persuasion" had prefigured some of its main principles; Ellis stated he had read him some years after inventing his therapy, but had studied Émile Coué since a young age.

From the late 1940s onward, Ellis worked on rational emotive behavioral therapy (REBT), and by January 1953 his break with psychoanalysis was complete, and he began calling himself a rational therapist. Ellis was now advocating a new more active and directive type of psychotherapy. In 1955, he presented rational therapy (RT). In RT, the therapist sought to help the client understand—and act on the understanding—that his personal philosophy contained beliefs that contributed to his own emotional pain. This new approach stressed actively working to change a client's self-defeating beliefs and behaviours by demonstrating their irrationality, self-defeatism, and rigidity. Ellis believed that through rational analysis and cognitive reconstruction, people could understand their self-defeatingness in light of their core irrational beliefs and then develop more rational constructs.

In 1954, Ellis began teaching his new techniques to other therapists, and by 1957, he formally set forth the first cognitive behavioral therapy by proposing that therapists help people adjust their thinking and behavior as the treatment for emotional and behavioral problems. Two years later, Ellis published How to Live with a Neurotic, which elaborated on his new method. In 1960, Ellis presented a paper on his new approach at the American Psychological Association (APA) convention in Chicago. There was mild interest, but few recognized that the paradigm set forth would become the zeitgeist within a generation. At that time, the prevailing interest in experimental psychology was behaviorism, while in clinical psychology it was the psychoanalytic schools of notables such as Freud, Jung, Adler, and Perls. Despite the fact that Ellis' approach emphasized cognitive, emotive, and behavioral methods, his strong cognitive emphasis provoked the psychotherapeutic establishment with the possible exception of the followers of Adler. Consequently, he was often received with significant hostility at professional conferences and in print. He regularly held seminars where he would bring a participant up on stage and treat them. His own therapeutical style was famed for often being delivered in a rough, confrontational style; however, it should not be confused with his rational-emotive and cognitive-behavioral therapy school that is practiced by his students and followers in a large variety of therapeutic styles (e.g., often depending on client's personality, client's clinical problem, and evidence-based information regarding the appropriate intervention, but also including therapist's own preference).

Despite the relative slow adoption of his approach in the beginning, Ellis founded his own institute. The Institute for Rational Living was founded as a non-profit organization in 1959. By 1968, it was chartered by the New York State Board of Regents as a training institute and psychological clinic.

=== Work as sexologist and sex and love researcher ===
By the 1960s, Ellis had come to be seen as one of the founders of the American sexual revolution. Especially in his earlier career, he was well known for his work as a sexologist and for his liberal humanistic, and in some camps controversial opinions on human sexuality. He also worked with noted zoologist and sex researcher Alfred Kinsey and explored in a number of books and articles the topic of human sexuality and love. Sex and love relations were his professional interests even from the beginning of his career. Norman Haire, in his preface to Ellis' 1952 book Sex Beliefs and Customs, applauded the work of the Society for the Prevention of Venereal Disease while he ridiculed its rival, the National Council for Combating Venereal Disease, who argued that preventive measures such as condoms would encourage vice: Haire called them "the Society for the Prevention of the Prevention of Venereal Disease".

In 1958, Ellis published his classic work Sex Without Guilt which came to be known for its advocacy of a liberal attitude toward sex. He contributed to Paul Krassner's magazine The Realist; among its articles, in 1964 he wrote if this be heresy... Is pornography harmful to children? In 1965, Ellis published a book entitled Homosexuality: Its Causes and Cure, which partly saw homosexuality as a pathology and therefore a condition to be cured. In 1973, the American Psychiatric Association reversed its position on homosexuality by declaring that it was not a mental disorder and thus not properly subject to cure, and in 1976, Ellis clarified his earlier views in Sex and the Liberated Man, expounding that some homosexual disturbed behaviors may be subject to treatment but, in most cases, that should not be attempted as homosexuality is not inherently good or evil, except from a religious viewpoint (See "Ellis and religion", below). Near the end of his life, he finally updated and re-wrote Sex Without Guilt in 2001 and released as Sex Without Guilt in the Twenty-First Century. In this book, he expounded and enhanced his humanistic view on sexual ethics and morality and dedicated a chapter on homosexuality to giving homosexuals advice and suggestion on how to more greatly enjoy and enhance their sexual love lives. While preserving some of the ideas about human sexuality from the original, the revision described his later humanistic opinions and ethical ideals as they had evolved in his academic work and practice.

=== Rational emotive behavior therapy (REBT) ===
Ellis is primarily known for his development of rational emotive behavior therapy (REBT). He published his first major book on it in 1962. REBT is an active-directive, philosophically, and empirically based psychotherapy, the aim of which is to resolve emotional and behavioral problems and disturbances and to help people to lead happier and more fulfilling lives. REBT sees disturbances as caused by characteristics of a person, rather than a particular past event

REBT is seen as the first form of cognitive behavioral therapy (CBT). Later in life Ellis wrote "I hope I am also not a devout REBTer, since I do not think it is an unmitigated cure for everyone and do accept its distinct limitations."

=== Unconditional self accepting ===
Ellis advocated the importance of accepting yourself just because you are alive, human, and unique - and not giving yourself a global rating, or being influenced by what others think of you.

=== Integrity assessment studies ===
In 1979 and during the next two decades, one part of Ellis' research was an exploration of behavioral integrity through applied experimental psychology, focusing on reliability, honesty, and loyalty as psychosocial behavior. Organizational commitment as a cognitive norm, evaluating concretely through images developed in his Institute.

In his book Personality Theories developed with Mike Abrams and Lidia Dengelegi Abrams establish the opinions of evaluation of integrity understanding the reason of each personality can have a change in their attitude, reliability is the common factor of their samples taken and of the which great advances were obtained to look for a tool to work with the human mind.

=== Religion ===
In his original version of his book Sex Without Guilt, Ellis expressed the opinion that religious restrictions on sexual expression are often needless and harmful to emotional health. He also famously debated religious psychologists, including Orval Hobart Mowrer and Allen Bergin, over the proposition that religion often contributed to psychological distress. Because of his forthright espousal of a nontheistic humanism, he was recognized in 1971 as Humanist of the Year by the American Humanist Association. By 2003, he was one of the signers of the Humanist Manifesto. Ellis most recently described himself as a probabilistic atheist, meaning that while he acknowledged that he could not be completely certain there is no god, he believed the probability a god exists was so small that it was not worth his or anyone else's attention.

While Ellis' personal atheism and humanism remained consistent, his views about the role of religion in mental health changed over time. In early comments delivered at conventions and at his institute in New York City, Ellis overtly and often with characteristically acerbic delivery stated that devout religious beliefs and practices were harmful to mental health. In "The Case Against Religiosity", a 1980 pamphlet published by his New York institute, he offered an idiosyncratic definition of religiosity as any devout, dogmatic, and demanding belief. He noted that religious codes and religious individuals often manifest religiosity, but added that devout, demanding religiosity is also obvious among many orthodox psychotherapists and psychoanalysts, devout political believers, and aggressive atheists.

Ellis was careful to state that REBT was independent of his atheism, noting that many skilled REBT practitioners are religious, including some who are ordained ministers. In his later days, he significantly toned down his opposition to religion. While Ellis maintained his firm atheistic stance, proposing that thoughtful, probabilistic atheism was likely the most emotionally healthy approach to life, he acknowledged and agreed with survey evidence suggesting that belief in a loving God can also be psychologically healthy. Based on this later approach to religion, he reformulated his professional and personal view in one of his last books The Road to Tolerance, and he also co-authored a book, Counseling and Psychotherapy with Religious Persons: A Rational Emotive Behavior Therapy Approach, with two religious psychologists, Stevan Lars Nielsen and W. Brad Johnson, describing principles for integrating religious material and beliefs with REBT during treatment of religious clients.

=== Political views ===
Ellis was a lifelong advocate for peace and an opponent of militarism. He also praised libertarian economist Walter Block's book, Defending the Undefendable.

== Later life ==
=== Professional contributions ===
While many of his ideas were criticized during the 1950s and '60s by the psychotherapeutic establishment, his reputation grew immensely in the subsequent decades. From the 1960s on, his prominence was steadily growing as the cognitive behavioral therapies (CBT) were gaining further theoretical and scientific ground. From then, CBT gradually became one of the most popular systems of psychotherapy in many countries, mainly due to the large body of rigorously conducted research that underpinned the work of the cognitive therapy school (a key part of the CBT family) founded by Aaron T. Beck. In the late 1960s, his institute launched a professional journal, and in the early 70s established "The Living School" for children between 6 and 13. The school provided a curriculum that incorporated the principles of RE(B)T. Despite its relative short life, interest groups generally expressed satisfaction with its programmer. Many schools of psychological thought became influenced by Albert Ellis, including rational behavior therapy created by a student of his, Maxie Clarence Maultsby Jr. Ellis had such an impact that in a 1982 survey, American and Canadian clinical psychologists and counsellors ranked him ahead of Freud when asked to name the figure who had exerted the average influence on their field. Also in 1982, in an analysis of psychology journals published in the US it was found that Ellis was the most cited author after 1957. In 1985, the APA presented Ellis with its award for "distinguished professional contributions".

He held many important positions in many professional societies including the Division of Consulting Psychology of the APA, Society for the Scientific Study of Sexuality, American Association of Marital and Family Therapy, the American Academy of Psychotherapists and the American Association of Sex Educators, Counsellors, and Therapists. In addition Ellis also served as consulting or associate editor of many scientific journals. Many professional societies gave Ellis their highest professional and clinical awards.

In the mid-1990s, he renamed his psychotherapy and behavior change system rational emotive behavior therapy (REBT). (It was originally known as rational therapy and then rational-emotive therapy.) This he did to stress the interrelated importance of cognition, emotion, and behavior in his therapeutic approach. In 1994, he also updated and revised his original, 1962 classic book, Reason and Emotion in Psychotherapy. During the remainder of his life, he continued developing the theory that cognition, emotion, and behavior are intertwined, and that a system for psychotherapy and behavior change must involve all three.

=== Public appearance ===
Ellis's work extended into areas other than psychology, including education, politics, business, and philosophy. He eventually became a prominent and confrontational social commenter and public speaker on a wide array of issues. During his career he publicly debated a vast number of people who represented opposing views to his; this included for example debates with psychologist Nathaniel Branden on Objectivism and psychiatrist Thomas Szasz on the topic of mental illness. On numerous occasions he critiqued opposing psychotherapeutic approaches, and questioned some of the doctrines in certain dogmatic religious systems, i.e., spiritualism and mysticism.

From 1965 until the end of his life he led his famous Friday Night Workshops, in which he conducted therapy sessions with volunteers from the audience. The 1970s found him introducing his popular "rational humorous songs" which combined humorous lyrics with a rational self-help message set to a popular tune. Ellis also held workshops and seminars on mental health and psychotherapy all over the world until his 90s.

=== Final years ===
Until he fell ill at the age of 92 in 2006, Ellis typically worked at least 16 hours a day, writing books in longhand on legal tablets, visiting with clients, and teaching. On his 90th birthday in 2003, he received congratulatory messages from well-known public figures such as then-President George W. Bush, New York senators Charles Schumer and Hillary Clinton, former President Bill Clinton, New York City Mayor Michael Bloomberg, and the Dalai Lama, who sent a silk scarf blessed for the occasion. In 2004, Ellis was taken ill with serious intestinal problems, which led to hospitalization and the removal of his large intestine. He returned to work after a few months of supportive care.

In 2005, he was removed from all professional duties and from the board of his own institute after a dispute over the management policies of the institute. Ellis was reinstated to the board in January 2006 after winning civil proceedings against the board members who removed him. On June 6, 2007, lawyers acting for Albert Ellis filed a suit against the Albert Ellis Institute in New York state court. The suit alleges a breach of a long-term contract with the AEI and sought recovery of the 45 East 65th Street property through the imposition of a constructive trust.

Despite his series of health issues and profound hearing loss, Ellis never stopped working with the assistance of his wife, Australian psychologist Debbie Joffe Ellis. In April 2006, Ellis was hospitalized with pneumonia, and spent more than a year shuttling between hospital and a rehabilitation facility. He eventually returned to his residence on the top floor of the Albert Ellis Institute where he died on July 24, 2007, in his wife's arms. Ellis had authored and co-authored more than 80 books and 1200 articles (including eight hundred scientific papers) during his lifetime. He died aged 93.

During his final years he worked on his only college textbook with longtime collaborator Mike Abrams with whom he co-authored 3 books along with several research articles and chapters, including the textbook Personality Theories: Critical Perspectives. Ellis' penultimate book was an autobiography entitled "All Out!" published by Prometheus Books in June 2010. The book was dedicated to and included contributions by his wife, Debbie Joffe Ellis, to whom he entrusted the legacy of REBT.

In early 2011, the book Rational Emotive Behavior Therapy by Albert and Debbie Joffe Ellis was released by the American Psychological Association. The book explains the essentials of the theory of REBT for students and practitioners of psychology as well as for the general public. In 2019 his wife, Debbie Joffe Ellis, updated the Rational Emotive Behavior Therapy book, and the second edition of that book was published. Albert Ellis and Debbie Joffe Ellis worked together in every area of his work in their years together; Albert Ellis entrusted her to continue his work and she was "the greatest love of his life".

In eulogy of Albert Ellis, APA past president Frank Farley states:

Psychology has had only a handful of legendary figures who not only command attention across much of the discipline but also receive high recognition from the public for their work. Albert Ellis was such a figure, known inside and outside of psychology for his astounding originality, his provocative ideas, and his provocative personality. He bestrode the practice of psychotherapy like a colossus...

In the opening ceremony of the 2013 American Psychological Association Convention, Ellis was posthumously awarded the APA Award For Outstanding Lifetime Contributions to Psychology. It highlights the profound and historic role played in the life and evolution of the fields of psychology and psychotherapy.

== Autobiographical works ==
Most of the books Ellis wrote after inventing REBT had a strong autobiographical element. He used anecdotes from his personal life to explain how the insights of REBT occurred to him and how they helped him cope with personal problems such as shyness, anger, and chronic illness. He also used anecdotes from client sessions to illustrate how his therapy worked. Two of Ellis last books were explicitly autobiographical. Rational-Emotive Behavior Therapy: It Works for Me -- It Can Work for You (Prometheus Books, 2004) recounts his early life and crises in an unusually candid way. It illustrates the way he handled his problems, at first through philosophy, and later through the application of his emerging therapeutic skills and insights. All Out!: An Autobiography (Prometheus Books, 2009) —published after his death—is a more traditional narrative of his life and work (though it also meant to be an inspirational story of the use of rational thinking in self-help).

== Personal life ==
Ellis's first marriage, to Karyl Corper, an actress, in 1938, ended in annulment. He had three children with Karyl after their divorce, when she was married to her husband Tony.

His second marriage, in 1956, to Rhoda Winter, a dancer, ended in divorce.

For 37 years, from 1965 to 2002, he lived in an open relationship with a companion, Janet L. Wolfe, a psychologist who had been executive director of the Ellis institute. She later called him a “closet mensch.”

In 2004 he married Dr. Debbie Joffe, who he described as 'the greatest love of his life'.

Ellis was an atheist and a secular humanist.

== Criticism ==
In his obituary in the British newspaper The Guardian, it was reported that some members of the psychotherapeutic establishment accused him of misinterpreting Freud and demanded evidence for his claims. It was noted that others, such as Aaron T. Beck, had conducted more rigorous testing than Ellis.

Ellis was often criticised for his language and his aggressive behaviour, such as in his debate with Ayn Rand follower Nathaniel Branden.

== Awards ==
- 2003 award from the Association for Rational Emotive Behaviour Therapy (UK)
- Association for Behavioral and Cognitive Therapies 2005 Lifetime Achievement Award
- Association for Behavioral and Cognitive Therapies 1996 Outstanding Clinician Award
- American Psychological Association 1985 award for Distinguished professional contributions to Applied Research
- American Humanist Association 1971 award for "Humanist of the Year"
- New York State Psychological Association 2006 Lifetime Distinguished Service Award
- American Counseling Association 1988 ACA Professional Development Award
- National Association of Cognitive-Behavioral Therapists' Outstanding Contributions to CBT Award
- American Psychological Association 2013 Award For Outstanding Lifetime Contributions to Psychology

== Published works ==
- The Folklore of Sex, Oxford, England: Charles Boni, 1951.
- The Homosexual in America: A Subjective Approach (introduction). NY: Greenberg, 1951.
- Sex Beliefs and Customs, London: Peter Nevill, 1952.
- The American Sexual Tragedy. NY: Twayne, 1954.
- Sex Life of the American Woman and the Kinsey Report. Oxford, England: Greenberg, 1954.
- The Psychology of Sex Offenders. Springfield, IL: Thomas, 1956.
- How To Live with a Neurotic. Oxford, England: Crown Publishers, 1957.
- Sex Without Guilt. NY: Hillman, 1958.
- The Art and Science of Love. NY: Lyle Stuart, 1960.
- A Guide to Successful Marriage, with Robert A. Harper. North Hollywood, CA: Wilshire Book, 1961.
- Creative Marriage, with Robert A. Harper. NY: Lyle Stuart, 1961.
- A Guide to Rational Living. Englewood Cliffs, N.J., Prentice-Hall, 1961.
- The Encyclopedia of Sexual Behavior, edited with Albert Abarbanel. NY: Hawthorn, 1961.
- The American Sexual Tragedy, 2nd Ed. rev. NY: Lyle Stuart, 1962.
- Reason and Emotion in Psychotherapy. NY: Lyle Stuart, 1962.
- Sex and the Single Man. NY: Lyle Stuart, 1963.
- If This Be Sexual Heresy. NY: Lyle Stuart, 1963.
- The Intelligent Woman's Guide to Man-hunting. NY: Lyle Stuart, 1963.
- Nymphomania: A Study of the Oversexed Woman, with Edward Sagarin. NY: Gilbert Press, 1964.
- Homosexuality: Its Causes and Cures. NY: Lyle Stuart, 1965.
- The Art of Erotic Seduction, with Roger Conway. NY: Lyle Stuart, 1967.
- Is Objectivism a Religion?. NY: Lyle Stuart, 1968.
- Growth Through Reason: Verbatim Cases in Rational-Emotive Therapy Science and Behavior Books. Palo Alto, California. 1971.
- Murder and Assassination, with John M. Gullo. NY: Lyle Stuart, 1971.
- The Civilized Couple's Guide to Extramarital Adventures, Pinnacle Books Inc, 1972.
- Executive Leadership: A Rational Approach, 1972. ISBN 0-917476115.
- Sensuous Person: Critique & Corrections, 1973.
- Humanistic Psychotherapy, NY McGraw, 1974 Sagarin ed.
- A New Guide to Rational Living. Wilshire Book Company, 1975. ISBN 0-87980-042-9.
- Sex and the Liberated Man, Secaucus, NJ: Lyle Stuart, 1976. ISBN 0-8184-0222-9
- Anger: How to Live With and Without It. Secaucus, NJ: Citadel Press, 1977. ISBN 0-8065-0937-6.
- Handbook of Rational-Emotive Therapy, with Russell Greiger & contributors. NY: Springer Publishing, 1977.
- How to Master Your Fear of Flying. Institute Rational Emotive Therapy, 1977. ISBN 978-0-917476-10-5.
- Overcoming Procrastination: Or How to Think and Act Rationally in Spite of Life's Inevitable Hassles, with William J. Knaus. Institute for Rational Living, 1977. ISBN 0-917476-04-2.
- How to Live With a Neurotic. Wilshire Book Company, 1979. ISBN 0-87980-404-1.
- Theoretical and Empirical Foundations of Rational-Emotive Therapy, 1980.
- How to Raise an Emotionally Healthy, Happy Child, 1981.
- Guide to Personal Happiness, 1981.
- Brief Psychotherapy in Medical and Health Practice, 1983.
- Overcoming Resistance: Rational-Emotive Therapy With Difficult Clients. NY: Springer Publishing, 1985. ISBN 0-8261-4910-3.
- When AA Doesn't Work For You: Rational Steps to Quitting Alcohol, with Emmett Velten. Barricade Books, 1992. ISBN 0-942637-53-4.
- The Art and Science of Rational Eating, with Mike Abrams and Lidia Abrams. Barricade Books, 1992. ISBN 0-942637-60-7.
- How to Cope with a Fatal Illness, with Mike Abrams. Barricade Books, 1994. ISBN 1-56980-005-7.
- Reason and Emotion in Psychotherapy, Revised and Updated. Secaucus, NJ: Carol Publishing Group, 1994. ISBN 1-55972-248-7.
- How to Keep People from Pushing Your Buttons, with Arthur Lange. Citadel Press, 1995. ISBN 0-8065-1670-4.
- Rational Interviews, with Stephen Palmer, Windy Dryden and Robin Yapp, (Eds). London: Centre for Rational Emotive Behaviour Therapy, 1995. ISBN 0-9524605-0-5.
- Alcohol: How to Give It Up and Be Glad You Did, with Philip Tate Ph.D. See Sharp Press, 1996. ISBN 1-884365-10-8.
- Better, Deeper, and More Enduring Brief Therapy: The Rational Emotive Behavior Therapy Approach Brunner/Mazel Publishers, NY 1996. ISBN 0-87630-792-6.
- Stress Counselling: A Rational Emotive Behaviour Approach, with Jack Gordon, Michael Neenan and Stephen Palmer. London: Cassell, 1997. ISBN 0-304-33469-3.
- How to Control Your Anger Before It Controls You, with Raymond Chip Tafrate. Citadel Press, 1998. ISBN 0-8065-2010-8.
- Optimal Aging: Get Over Getting Older, with Emmett Velten. Chicago, Open Court Press, 1998. ISBN 0-8126-9383-3.
- Rational Emotive Therapy: A Therapists Guide, with Catharine MacLaren. Atascadero, CA: Impact Publishers.1998. ISBN 978-1-8862-3012-5.
- How to Make Yourself Happy and Remarkably Less Disturbable. Impact Publishers, 1999. ISBN 1-886230-18-8.
- How to Control your Anxiety before it Controls you. Citadel Press, 2000. ISBN 0-806-52136-8.
- How to Stubbornly Refuse to Make Yourself Miserable About Anything: Yes, Anything, Lyle Stuart, 2000, ISBN 0-8184-0456-6.
- Making Intimate Connections: Seven Guidelines for Great Relationships and Better Communication, with Ted Crawford. Impact Publishers, 2000. ISBN 1-886230-33-1.
- The Secret of Overcoming Verbal Abuse: Getting Off the Emotional Roller Coaster and Regaining Control of Your Life, with Marcia Grad Powers. Wilshire Book Company, 2000. ISBN 0-87980-445-9.
- Counseling and Psychotherapy With Religious Persons: A Rational Emotive Behavior Therapy Approach, Stevan Lars Nielsen, W. Brad Johnson, and Albert Ellis. Mahwah, NJ: Lawrence Erlbaum Associates, 2001. ISBN 0-8058-2878-8.
- Overcoming Destructive Beliefs, Feelings, and Behaviors: New Directions for Rational Emotive Behavior Therapy. Prometheus Books, 2001. ISBN 1-57392-879-8.
- Feeling Better, Getting Better, Staying Better: Profound Self-Help Therapy For Your Emotions. Impact Publishers, 2001. ISBN 1-886230-35-8.
- Case Studies in Rational Emotive Behavior Therapy With Children and Adolescents, with Jerry Wilde. Upper Saddle River, NJ: Merrill/Prentice Hall, 2002. ISBN 0-13087-281-4.
- Overcoming Resistance: A Rational Emotive Behavior Therapy Integrated Approach, 2nd ed. NY: Springer Publishing, 2002. ISBN 0-8261-4912-X.
- Ask Albert Ellis: Straight Answers and Sound Advice from America's Best-Known Psychologist. Impact Publishers, 2003. ISBN 1-886230-51-X.
- Sex Without Guilt in the 21st Century. Barricade Books, 2003. ISBN 1-56980-258-0.
- Dating, Mating, and Relating. How to Build a Healthy Relationship, with Robert A. Harper. Citadel Press Books, 2003. ISBN 0-8065-2454-5
- Rational Emotive Behavior Therapy: It Works For Me—It Can Work For You. Prometheus Books, 2004. ISBN 1-59102-184-7.
- The Road to Tolerance: The Philosophy of Rational Emotive Behavior Therapy. Prometheus Books, 2004. ISBN 1-59102-237-1.
- The Myth of Self-Esteem. Prometheus Books, 2005. ISBN 1-59102-354-8.
- Rational Emotive Behavior Therapy: A Therapist's Guide (2nd Edition), with Catharine MacLaren. Impact Publishers, 2005. ISBN 1-886230-61-7.
- Rational Emotive Behavioral Approaches to Childhood Disorders • Theory, Practice and Research (2nd Edition) With Michael E. Bernard (Eds.). Springer SBM, 2006. ISBN 978-0-3872-6374-8
- Are Capitalism, Objectivism, And Libertarianism Religions? Yes!: Greenspan And Ayn Rand Debunked. CreateSpace Independent Publishing Platform, 2007. ISBN 1-43480-885-8
- Personality Theories: Critical Perspectives, with Mike Abrams, PhD, and Lidia Abrams, PhD. Sage Press, 2008 ISBN 978-1-4129-1422-2
- All Out! An Autobiography, with Debby Joffe-Ellis. Prometheus Books, 2009. ISBN 1-59102-452-8.

== See also ==
- Alfred Adler
- Albert Bandura
- Aaron T. Beck
- William Glasser
- George Kelly
- Alfred Korzybski
- Maxie Clarence Maultsby Jr.
- Karl Popper
- Bertrand Russell
- Martin Seligman
- Paul Tillich
- Clinical psychology
- Cognitive behavioral therapy
- Cognitive therapy
- Counseling psychology
- History of psychotherapy
- Mental health
- Philosophy
- Psychotherapy
- Rational behavior therapy
- Rational emotive behavior therapy
