= RBT =

RBT may refer to:

== Computing ==
- Red–black tree, in computer science
- Residual block termination, in cryptography
- Risk-based testing, in software testing

== Other uses ==
- Postal code for Rabat, Malta
- Random breath test or sobriety checkpoints
  - RBT (TV series), an Australian docuseries
- Rational behavior therapy, a form of cognitive behavioral therapy
- Registered behavior technician, an occupation in the professional practice of behavior analysis
- Residence-based taxation
- Ringback tone, in telephony
