= Young adult =

Phase of the human life span at the onset of adulthood

In medicine and the social sciences, a young adult is generally a person in the years following adolescence, sometimes with some overlap. Definitions and opinions on what qualifies as a young adult vary, with works such as Erik Erikson's stages of human development significantly influencing the definition of the term. The United States Census Bureau, for instance, defines young adults as those between the ages of 18 and 34. In addition, cancer researchers consider those between the ages of 18 and 49 to be young adults. Over 65 million Americans born approximately from 1991 to 2008, would likely fall under this category. The young adult stage in human development precedes middle adulthood. It is typically followed by middle adulthood, which is often associated with stability in career and relationships.

Erikson described this stage as focused on the development of intimate relationships and personal identity. Legal developments also show evolving views on young adulthood, with some court rulings considering the developmental stages of individuals under the age of 21 in sentencing decisions. Some developmental researchers describe young adult as an "emerging adulthood" stage between adolescence and full adulthood, characterized by continued brain maturation into the early 30s. This period imposes many challenges in the health and well being, as well as psychological development of humans.

The brain was thought to finish developing around age 25, though recent studies suggest this extends into the early 30s. Neuroscientific research indicates that the prefrontal cortex, which is associated with executive function and decision-making, continues to mature through adolescence and into early adulthood.

Young adults tend to have a lower voter turnout than people of middle age or old age. This pattern has been observed across multiple countries and is linked to differences in political engagement and life circumstances.

The phrase "young adult" is also frequently used to market young adult novels to readers in the literary industry of young adult literature. These are books targeted at children down to ages 13 or 14. This broad extension of young adult to minors has been disputed, as they are not considered adults by the law or in most cultures, outside of religion (such as the Bar or Bat Mitzvah in Judaism), and the tradition of biological adulthood beginning at puberty has become archaic.

== Time co-ordinates ==
For a variety of reasons, timelines on young adulthood cannot be exactly defined—producing different results according to the different mix of overlapping indices (legal, maturational, occupational, sexual, emotional, and the like) employed, or on whether a developmental perspective... [or] the socialization perspective is taken. 'Sub-phases in this timetable of psycho-social growth patterns... are not rigid, and both social change and individual variations must be taken into account'—not to mention regional and cultural differences. Arguably indeed, with people living longer, and also reaching puberty earlier, 'age norms for major life events have become highly elastic' by the twenty-first century. Due to generational changes, the pathway for young adults to fulfill their adult responsibilities has become less predictable. With growing changes in college education costs, living arrangements, and work and education opportunities, young adults are experiencing various life transitions in many stages of adulthood rather than one stage itself.

Some have suggested that after 'Pre-adulthood... in the first 20 years or so... the second era, Early Adulthood, lasts from about age 18/19 to 45... the adult era of greatest energy and abundance and of greatest contradiction and stress.' Within that framework, 'the Early Adult Transition (18–22) is a developmental bridge between pre-adulthood and early adulthood', recognizing that 'the transition into adulthood is not a clear-cut dividing line'. One might alternatively speak of 'a Provisional Adulthood (18–30)... [&] the initiation to First Adulthood' as following that. Alternatively, MIT has generally defined "young adulthood" as 18 to 22 or 18 to 25, although this is likely to align with the typical age range of college students.

Despite all such fluidity, there is broad agreement that it is essentially the twenties and thirties that constitute 'Early adulthood... the basis for what Levinson calls the Dream—a vision of his [or her] goals in life which provide motivation and enthusiasm for the future.'

== Developmental context ==
Research in developmental psychology and neuroscience suggests that young adulthood involves continued development beyond adolescence. This is described as "emerging adulthood", a stage between adolescence and adulthood. Studies also discuss that the prefrontal cortex continues to mature into early adulthood, which affects decision-making.This stage is also associated with increased independence and transition into education, work, and relationships.

== Health ==
Young/prime adulthood can be considered the healthiest time of life and young adults are generally in good health, subject neither to disease nor the problems of senescence. Strength and physical performance reach their peak from 18 to 46 years of age. Flexibility may decrease with age throughout adulthood.

As teens transition into young adulthood, engagement in risky behavior may be noticeable, which may result in health risks such as "unintended injury, unprotected sex, violence, binge drinking, motor vehicle incidents, suicide, and poor diet and nutrition." Brain development during this period can also contribute to patterns of risk-taking behavior and mental health outcomes in young adults. 75% of deaths during the young adult years are due to risky behavior or mental health crises leading to suicide. In developed countries, mortality rates for the 18–45 age group are typically very low. Men are more likely to die at this age than women, particularly in the 18–25 group: reasons include car accidents and suicide. Mortality statistics among men and women level off during the late twenties and thirties, due in part to good health and less risk-taking behavior.

There has been an increase in the presence of mental illness among young adults globally. This increase has been linked to factors such as diet and exercise. Those dealing with the effects of mental illness are more likely to indulge in food that lacks nutrients and is high in sugar, salt, and fats. Mental illnesses and risk taking behaviors correlate to the transition between the teen years and adulthood.

Regarding disease, cancer is much less common in young than in older adults. Exceptions are testicular cancer, cervical cancer, colorectal cancer, and Hodgkin's lymphoma.

In sub-Saharan Africa, HIV/AIDS has hit the early adult population particularly hard. According to a United Nations report, AIDS has significantly increased mortality between ages 20 to 55 for African males and 20 to 45 for African females, reducing the life expectancy in South Africa by 18 years and in Botswana by 34 years.

== Theory ==
=== Erik Erikson's theories of early adulthood ===
According to Erik Erikson, in the wake of the adolescent emphasis upon identity formation, 'the young adult, emerging from the search for and insistence on identity, is eager and willing to fuse their identity with that of others. He [or she] is ready for intimacy, that is, the capacity to commit... to concrete affiliations and partnerships.' To do so means the ability 'to face the fear of ego loss in situations which call for self-abandon: in the solidarity of close affiliations, in orgasms and sexual unions, in close friendships and in physical combat'. Avoidance of such experiences 'because of a fear of ego-loss may lead to a deep sense of isolation and consequent self-absorption'.

Where isolation is avoided, the young adult may find instead that 'satisfactory sex relations... in some way take the edge off the hostilities and potential rages caused by the oppositeness of male and female, of fact and fancy, of love and hate'; and may grow into the ability to exchange intimacy, love, and compassion.

In modern societies, young adults in their late teens and early 20s encounter a number of issues as they finish school and begin to hold full-time jobs and take on other responsibilities of adulthood; and 'the young adult is usually preoccupied with self-growth in the context of society and relationships with others.' The danger is that in 'the second era, Early Adulthood... we must make crucially important choices regarding marriage, family, work, and lifestyle before we have the maturity or life experience to choose wisely.'

While 'young adulthood is filled with avid quests for intimate relationships and other major commitments involving career and life goals', there is also "a parallel pursuit for the formulation of a set of moral values". Erikson has argued that it is only now that what he calls the 'ideological mind' of adolescence gives way to 'that ethical sense which is the mark of the adult.'

Reaching adulthood in modern society is not always a linear or clean transition. As generations continue to adapt, new markers of adulthood are created that add different social expectations of what it means to be an adult.

=== Daniel Levinson's theory of adult development ===
Daniel Levinson argued that developmental sequences continue to occur as we transition into adulthood. Levinson's theory centers around Erik Erikson's conception of life courses. This theory of Erikson includes patterns and relationships of events in the person's life that distinguishes them. The study of life courses covers all aspects of life relationships, internal and external feelings, bodily changes, and the good and bad times that are experienced. Preadulthood, Early Adulthood, Middle Adulthood, and Late Adulthood are the four eras that constitute the life course. Preadulthood begins with conception and continues to roughly the age of 22. During these years the person grows from being extremely dependent and undifferentiated to being a more independent responsible adult. This is the era in that we see the most biopsychosocial growth. The Early Adulthood Transition is part of this first stage while also being a part of the second stage, which is from the age of 18-19 to 22. Here is when the pre-adulthood era begins to draw to a close and the transition to early adulthood begins. It is here that the individual begins to modify their relationship from the pre-adult world so that they fit better to the adult world they are creating. The second era Early adulthood begins at age 18-19and goes till 45. It begins during the early adulthood transition and has the greatest amount of energy, contradiction, and stress. This is typically the time for pursuing ambitions and aspirations, finding a place in society (which also includes the first home), forming families, strengthening relationships and as the era ends establishing a solid position in the adult world. The third period (Middle Adulthood) begins at age 45 and goes till 65, here we begin to see a decline in our biological capacities and mental faculties, though this decline is not enough to completely deplete us of the energy we had during early adulthood and it still allows us to continue to have a socially valuable life. The final era is late adulthood which begins at age 65 and ends with death. In this era, the individual has to find a new balance between involvement with society and the self. An individuals health begins to deteriorate at an increased, albeit varying rate, as such they should be given the ability to freely choose the mode in which they live their lives.

== Settling down ==
After the relative upheaval of the early 30s, the middle to late 30s is often characterized by settling down: 'the establishment phase', involving 'what we would call major life investments—work, family, friends, community activities, and values.' After making major investments in life, individuals make deeper commitments and thus pursue them with increased determination. What has been termed 'the Culminating Life Structure for Early Adulthood (33–40) is the vehicle for completing this era and realizing our youthful aspirations.' People in their thirties may increase the financial and emotional investments they make in their lives, and may have been employed long enough to gain promotions and raises. They often become more focused on advancing their careers and gaining stability in their personal lives—'with marriage and child-rearing,' starting a family, coming to the fore as priorities for many, though it's not universal.

Gail Sheehy, however, signposts the same twenties/thirties division differently, arguing that 'the twenties have stretched out into a long Provisional Adulthood', and that in fact 'the transition to the Turbulent Thirties marks the initiation to First Adulthood.'

== Midlife transition ==
Young adulthood then draws to its close with 'the Midlife Transition, from roughly age 46 to 50'—producing 'a brand-new passage in the forties, when First Adulthood ends and Second Adulthood begins.' In the midlife transition, early adulthood often ends, and individuals make changes in their lives, such as in their career. The end of early adulthood can be defined as when a person stops seeking adult status or wanting to feel like an adult. When people reach the midlife transition, they shift from talking about how old they are to bolster their reputation and emphasize how young they are. In the midlife transition, individuals focus more on the present than the future and the past. In this transitional period from early to middle adulthood, individuals tend to focus less on themselves and more on their relationships. In addition, individuals experience physical changes which may then subsequently necessitate a change in regard to their perceived body image.

Levinson thought of the midlife as a time of crisis. However, recent research shows that midlife crisis is not a general experience. Instead, individuals report their midlife to be an open and free period of life. In the midlife transition, the issue is not whether the individual has achieved or failed in accomplishing the goals they formed in the previous era. Rather the issue at hand is what the individual should be doing with the experience of disparity between their goals and outcomes.

== See also ==
- Emerging adulthood
- Quarter-life crisis
- Twixter
- Young adult fiction
- Young professional
- Youth culture
- Youth engagement
- Youth politics
- Youth rights
- Youth suicide
- Youth

== Notes ==
- Erikson, Erik H (1975). Childhood and Society. Penguin. ISBN 978-0-14-020754-5.
- Erikson, Erik H (1993). Childhood and Society. WW Norton & Company. doi:10.1002/1520-6807(199507)32:3<243::AID-PITS2310320315>3.0.CO;2-4. ISBN 0-393-31068-X.
- Erikson, Erik H. (1982). The Life Cycle Completed. W. W. Norton. ISBN 0-393-01622-6
- Erikson, Joan (1997). "Ninth stage of development". The life cycle completed: Extended version with new chapters. Erikson, Erik H. New York: WW Norton & Company. ISBN 0-393-03934-X.
- Sheehy, Gail (1996). New Passages: Mapping Your Life Across Time. Ballantine. ISBN 978-0-00-255619-4.
- Rapoport, Rhona; Rapoport, Robert N. (1980). Growing Through Life. Harper & Row. ISBN 978-0-06-384751-4.
- Birch, Ann (1997). Developmental Psychology: From Infancy to Adulthood (2nd ed.). Macmillan. ISBN 978-0-333-66959-4. Archived from the original on 2022-07-05.
- Zastrow, Charles; Kirst-Ashman, Karen (2009). Understanding Human Behavior and the Social Environment. Cengage Learning. ISBN 978-0-495-60374-0.

Preceded by Adolescence	Stages of human development Young adult	Succeeded by Middle age
