= Maxie Clarence Maultsby Jr. =

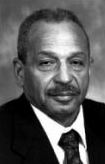
- Born: April 24, 1932; Pensacola, Florida, US
- Died: August 28, 2016 (aged 84); Alexandria, Virginia, US
- Education: Talladega College, B.A., Case Western Reserve University Medical School, M.D.
- Known for: Founding of the Rational Behavior Therapy method, Rational Self-Counseling technique, and the New Self-Help Alcoholic Relapse Prevention Treatment Method
- Awards: Elected Distinguished Life Fellow of the American Psychiatric Association, recipient of the Lifetime Achievement Award from the National Association of Cognitive-Behavioral Therapists
- Scientific career
- Fields: Psychiatry, emotional and behavioral self-management
- Workplaces: Philadelphia General Hospital, US Air Force, University of Wisconsin, Madison, University of Kentucky, Howard University, Saint Elizabeth's Hospital

Maxie Clarence Maultsby Jr. (April 24, 1932 in Pensacola, Florida – August 28, 2016 in Alexandria, Virginia) was an American psychiatrist, author of several books on emotional and behavioral self-management, Elected Distinguished Life Fellow of the American Psychiatric Association, and recipient of the Lifetime Achievement Award from the National Association of Cognitive-Behavioral Therapists. He is the founder of the method of psychotherapy called Rational Behavior Therapy, the emotional self-help technique called Rational Self-Counseling, and the New Self-Help Alcoholic Relapse Prevention Treatment Method. He was an Emeritus Professor at the College of Medicine at Howard University in Washington D.C.

== Early life, education, and early career ==
Maultsby was born on April 24, 1932, in Pensacola, Florida and graduated from Jones High School in Orlando, FL in 1949. He received his B.A. from Talladega College in Alabama in 1953. He then attended Medical School at Case Western Reserve University in Cleveland, Ohio, where he received his M.D. in 1957. Upon graduation from medical school, he worked for one year at the Philadelphia General Hospital as an intern, and then moved to Cocoa, Florida, to become a General Practitioner of Medicine. In 1962 he became a medical officer in the US Air Force, a position he held for four years, before working for several hospitals associated with the University of Wisconsin through a Psychiatry Residency, which was then followed by a Residency in Child Psychiatry. During this time he also participated in an intensive training in Behaviour Therapy with Joseph Wolpe at the Eastern Psychiatric Institute, in Philadelphia, Pennsylvania, as well as studied Autogenic Training with Wolfgang Luth in Montreal, Canada.

== Professional life in psychiatry ==
In 1970, Maultsby joined the medical faculty at the University of Wisconsin, Madison, and one year later became an assistant professor in psychiatry there, as well as the Director of the Adult Psychiatric Outpatient Program at the University of Kentucky. In 1973, Maultsby founded the Training and Treatment Center for Rational Behavior Therapy, an institute which helped formalize the increasingly influential psychiatric approach created by Maultsby called Rational Behavior Therapy. Maultsby was the Director of the Training and Treatment Center from its origination until 1987. During this time Maultsby worked with Albert Ellis, founder of Rational Emotive Behavior Therapy, and in 1974 co-published with him the Technique for Using Rational Emotive Imagery, a treatise that combined and elucidated their research results, which demonstrated that many individuals can learn to manage their emotions through a process of rational evaluation, and by relearning mental behavior, can overcome self-destructive thoughts and condition themselves for mental responses that result in a happier and more rewarding life.

In the mid-1980s Maultsby cooperated with O. Carl Simonton, M.D., a radiation oncologist and pioneer of psycho-oncology. Their work together resulted in the introduction of Maultsby's cognitive-behavioral self-help tools as a modification of the Rational Self-Analysis technique to work with cancer patients and their families. In 1987 he left the Training and Treatment Center for Rational Behavior Therapy and his academic position at Kentucky to briefly serve as Director of the Bryan Psychiatric Hospital in Columbia, SC, and shortly after become the medical director of Southern Nevada Adult Mental Health Services in Las Vegas, NV. Maultsby became the Chair of Howard University's Department of Psychiatry in 1989, and was given the title of Emeritus Professor there in 2004. In 2011, Maultsby also became a professor in the Psychiatry Residence Training Program, at Saint Elizabeth's Hospital, under the Department of Mental Health in Washington D.C.

== Unique contributions of Rational Behavior Therapy ==
Maultsby and Rational Behavior Therapy made several unique contributions to psychotherapy in general, and cognitive-behavioral therapy in particular:

- Based on the neurophysiology of a healthy human brain (unlike other therapies based on introspection, observation, or the philosophical influences of Hellenistic Stoicism on Rational Emotive Behavior Therapy).
- Is relatively easy to teach and easy to learn (doesn't require identification of disorders or knowledge of medical terms).
- Clients define what is healthy thinking for them.
- Clients are coached to become their own therapists (Rational Behavior Self-Counseling).
- In 1971, RBT psychiatrists pioneered visualization practices and the use of imagery to develop healthy thoughts, emotions and behaviors.
- Developed the psychosomatic learning theory of human behaviors and was amongst the first psychotherapies to recognize cognitive-emotive dissonance as an inevitable stage in the process of voluntary change. When one starts practicing a new, healthier behavior that is in conflict with old habits one begins experiencing a feeling as wrong, weird, or unnatural. This is the stage where people frequently quit practicing.
- Accepts the potential health value of religious, spiritual, and deeply rooted philosophical or existential beliefs, and their beneficial application and integration into a cognitive-behavioral, non-denominational, spiritual or existential counseling.

== The International Association for Clear Thinking ==
In 1978, Maultsby founded The International Association for Clear Thinking, Inc., a 501(c)3 Non-Profit Organization. The organization is dedicated to helping individuals reduce and eliminate painful emotional stress through a system of rational thinking and self-counseling. After Maultsby's resignation in 1990, the board of directors decided to continue IACT Non-Profit and training activities. IACT self-help materials and seminars have been provided free to participants since its foundation and IACT activities are fully funded by donations and voluntary contributions from participants.

The IACT Program is structured around research and studies from recognized experts and researchers in cognitive behavior therapy. The current program has been designed to provide a condensed simple, easy to understand process for personal stress management through 'Clear Thinking Analysis' and 'Emotional Re-education.' Key research for these techniques were developed by Maxie C. Maultsby Jr. and Albert Ellis, who is well known for his development of the ABC model of cognitive therapy. Maultsby's cognitive behavior therapy tools are utilized and developed at the International Association for Clear Thinking, including the scientifically researched studies of "Rational Self Counseling" and "Clear Thinking Criteria" which demonstrate that with dedication, rational clear thinking, and analysis, many individuals can eliminate learned and well-practiced irrational self-defeating thoughts and behaviors that cause unhappiness and stress.

== Major professional interests ==
Maultsby conducted research on Rational Self–Counseling with and without professional psychotherapeutic assistance, and pioneered RBT-based relapse prevention treatment techniques for alcoholics and other substance abusing children and adults. Recent research in Rational Self-Counseling has also been extended to enhance the rehabilitative process of medical patients with acute and chronic illnesses. Having taught at many universities and pedagogical institutions, as well as conducting workshops and seminars all over the world, Maultsby became interested in developing effective, low–cost ways of making the classroom an emotional health improvement center. Rational Behavior Therapy has continued to grow in influence since its beginning and has practitioners in many continents across the globe, and Maultsby himself had a significant following as a psychiatrist in not only the United States, but also the South Africa, Finland, and Poland. Some of Maultsby's notable students included Aldo R. Pucci, T. Allen Gore, and psychiatrists Aleksandra Wirga and Mariusz Wirga.

== Bibliography ==
=== Books and major works ===
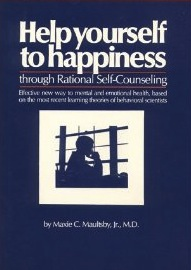
Help Yourself to Happiness

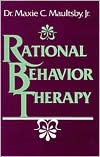
Rational Behavior Therapy

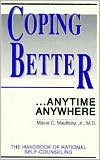
Coping Better ...Anytime, Anywhere

- Maultsby, M.C. Rational Encounter, a Research Project Publication, 1971, (out of print)
- Maultsby, M.C. Handbook of Rational Self-Counseling, Lexington, Kentucky: Association for Rational Thinking, 1971. (out of print)
- Maultsby, M.C. and Hendricks, A. You and Your Emotions, Lexington, Kentucky: Rational Self – Help Aids, Inc. 1974 (Later translated into Spanish, German, Swiss-German, Dutch).
- Maultsby, M.C. More Personal Happiness through Rational Self-Counseling, Lexington, Kentucky: Rational Behavior Therapy Center, 1974 (out of print)
- Goodman, D.S. and Maultsby, M.C. Emotional Well-Being Through Rational Behavior Training, Springfield, Illinois: Charles C. Thomas Publishers. Revised third edition 1977 (out of print)
- Maultsby, M.C. Help Yourself to Happiness Through Rational Self-Counseling, New York: Institute for Rational Living, 1976. (Later translated into Swedish and Polish).
- Maultsby, M.C. Guia Illustrada del Medico Para el Autotratemientio Emocional, (Spanish version of You and Your Emotions, translated by Munoz, C., M.A. and Maultsby, R.O.) Lexington, Kentucky: Rational Self-Help Aids, Inc., 1977
- Maultsby, M.C. A Million Dollars for Your Hangover: The Illustrated Guide for the New Self-Help Alcohol Treatment Method, Lexington, Kentucky: Rational Self-Help Books, 1979 (out of print). New version: Stay Sober and Straight 2001.
- Brandsma, J.M., Maultsby, M.C. and Welsh, R.J. Outpatient Treatment of Alcoholism, Baltimore, University Park Press, 1980.
- Maultsby, M.C. Your Guide to Emotional Well-Being (revised edition of the Handbook of Rational Self-Counseling) Lexington, Kentucky: Rational Self-Help Aids, Inc.,1980
- Maultsby, M.C. Rational Behavior Therapy, Englewood Cliffs, New Jersey: Prentice-Hall Inc., 1984. (Later translated into Polish).
- Maultsby, M.C. Coping Better … Anytime, Anywhere, New York: Simon and Schuster, 1986.
- Maultsby, M.C. Parempia Tunteita…Rationaalisen itse-erittelyn opas (Instant Better feelings without Drugs), Edited and translated by Laakso, J. and Manninen, R. Turku, Finland: Varhaiskuntoutuksen tukisaatio, 1992.
- Maultsby, M.C., Nyffeler, H, Vuorinen – Maultsby, R. Sie und Ihre Gefühle, (revised edition of You and Your Emotions). Druck Calligraphy, CH-3960 Sierre, Switzerland 2002.

Related booklets

- Maultsby, M.C. Freedom from Alcohol and Tranquilizers Five booklet series, Lexington, Kentucky: Rational Self-Help Books, 1979.
- Maultsby, M.C. The Professionals Guide to Rational Bibliotherapy, Lexington, Kentucky: Rational Behavior Training Center, 1981.

=== Academic articles ===
- Bada, D.W., Driscol, T.E., and Maultsby, M.C. "The Role of the Symptom in Psychosomatic Disease." American Journal of Psychiatry 113:12 (1957):1081-1088.
- Maultsby, M.C. "Against Technical Eclecticism." Psychological Reports 22 (1968): 926–928.
- Maultsby, M.C. "Seven Reflections on Scientism and Psychotherapy." Psychological Reports 22 (1968): 1311–1312.
- Maultsby, M.C. "Pamphlets as a Psychotherapeutic Aid." Rational Living 3:2 (1969): 31–34.
- Maultsby, M.C. "Routine Tape Recorder Use in RET." Rational Living 5:1 (1970):8-23
- Maultsby, M.C. "Systematic Written Homework in Psychotherapy." Psychotherapy: Theory, Research and Practice 8:3 (1971): 195–198.
- Maultsby, M.C. "Written Homework for the Patient with an Emotional Crisis." American Family Physician 4:6 (1971): 69–75.
- Maultsby, M.C. and Slack W.V. "A Computer Based Psychiatry History System." Archives of General Psychiatry 8:3 (1971): 570–572.
- Maultsby, M.C. "Rational Emotive Imagery." Rational Living 6:1 (1971) 24-26
- Maultsby, M.C. and Graham, J.M. "Patient's Response to the Use of Tape Recorders in Psychotherapy – A Clinical Case Study of 56 Patients." Journal of the National Medical Association 64:4 (1972): 375.
- Maultsby, M.C. "Decreasing Prescription Suicides: A Behavioral Approach to Irrational Fears and Insomnia." Journal of the American Medical Women's Association 27:8 (1972).
- Maultsby, M.C. and Steifel, L. "A Theory of Rational Behavior Group Process." Rational Living 7:1 (1972): 28–34.
- Maultsby, M.C. "The Neurotic Fear of Being a Phony." Corrective Psychiatry and Journal of Social Therapy 18:4 (1972): 28–34.
- Maultsby, M.C. and Graham, D.T. "Controlled Study of Effects of Psychotherapy on Self-Reported Maladaptive Traits, Anxiety Scores, and Psychosomatic Disease Attitudes." Journal of Psychiatric Research 10 (1974): 121-132
- Maultsby, M.C. "The Classroom as an Emotional Health Center." Social Learning 31:5 (1974): 8–11.
- Maultsby, M.C., Knipping, P.J. and Carpenter, L.L., "Teaching Self-Help in the Classroom with Rational Self-Counseling." The Journal of School Health 44:8 (1974): 445–448.
- Maultsby, M.C. and Gram, J.M. "Dream Changes Following Successful Rational Behavior Therapy." Rational Living 9:2 (1974): 30–33.
- Maultsby, M.C. Jr., & Ellis, Albert. "Techniques for Using Rational-Emotive Imagery (REI)," New York: Institute for Rational Living, 1974
- Maultsby, M.C. "Rational Behavior Therapy for Acting-Out Adolescents." Social Casework 56 (1975): 15–41.
- Brandsma, J.M., Maultsby, M.C., Welsh, R., and Hellen, S. "The Court-Probated Alcoholic and Outpatient Treatment Attrition." British Journal of Addiction (1975).
- Maultsby, M.C., Winkler, P.J. and Norton, J.C. "Semi-Automated Psychotherapy with Preventive Features." Journal of the Internal Academy of Preventive Medicine (1976): 27–37.
- Maultsby, M.C., "Patients' Opinions of the Therapeutic Relationship in Rational Behavior Psychotherapy." Psychological Reports 37 (1975): 795–798.
- Maultsby, M.C. "The Evolution of RBT (Rational Behavior Therapy)." Proceedings of the Annual Conference of Rational Emotive and Behavioral Therapists." Chicago, Illinois (1977): 88-94.
- Knipping, P.J., Maultsby, M.C. and Thomas, P. "The Technology for Using the Classroom as an Emotional Health Center." The Journal of School Health (1976): 278–281.
- Maultsby, M.C., Costell, R.T., and Carpenter, L.L. "Classroom Emotional Education and Optimum Health." Journal of the International Academy of Preventive Medicine (1976): 24–31.
- Maultsby, M.C. "Parentism: A Behavioral Analysis and Rational Solution." Voices – Journal of the American Academy of Psychotherapists 12:4 (Winter, 1976–1977).
- Maultsby, M.C. "Introduction and Summary of Rational Behavior Therapy – The Art and the Science." University of Northern Colorado Press, 1976.
- Maultsby, M.C. "Combining Music Therapy and Rational Behavior Therapy." Journal of Music Therapy 14:2 (1977): 89–97.
- Maultsby, M.C. and Knipping, P.J. "Rational Self-Counseling: Primary Prevention for Alcohol Abuse." Alcohol Health and Research World 2:1 (1977): 31–35.
- Maultsby, M.C. "Helping Prisoners Help Themselves Rationally." Proceedings of the Twelfth Interagency Workshop, 1977 Sam Houston State University, Huntsville, Texas, 1978
- Maultsby, M.C. and Carpenter, L.L. "Emotional Self-Defense for the Elderly." Journal of Psychedelic Drugs 10:2 (April – June, 1978): 157–160.
- Gore, T.A. and Maultsby, M.C. "The Rational Alcoholic Relapse-Prevention Treatment Method: A New Self-Help Alcoholism Treatment Method." Alcoholism Treatment Quarterly Vol. 2, nos. ¾ Fall 1985/Winter (1985/1986): 243.
- Maultsby, M.C. "Teaching Rational Self-Counseling to Middle Graders." The School Counselor (January 1986): 207–219.
- Maultsby, M.C. "Behavioral Prescriptions for Stress Disorders." Medical Times (April 1986): 117–122.
- Maultsby, M.C. "A Needed Change in Traditional Marriage Counseling." Alabama A.C.D. Journal Vol. 14, No. 2 (Spring 1988) 5-12

=== Other publications ===
- Maultsby, M.C., "A Relapsed Client with Severe Phobic Reactions," pp. 179–222 in Albert Ellis, ed. Growth Through Reason. Palo Alto, California: Science and Behavior Books, 1971.
- Maultsby, M.C., "The Principles of Intensive Rational Behavior Therapy," pp. 52–57 in J.L. Wolfe and. E. Brand, Eds. Twenty Years of Rational Therapy: Proceedings of the First National Conference on Rational Psychotherapy. New York: The Institute for Rational Living, 1977.
- Maultsby, M.C., "The ABC's of Better Emotional Self-Control," in Charles Zastrow and Daw Chang (Eds.) The Personal Problem Solver: Jamaica, New York: Spectrum Publications, 1977.
- Maultsby, M.C., "Emotional Re-Education," in Russell Grieger (ed.) Rational Emotive Psychotherapy: Handbook of Theory and Practice. New York, N.Y. Springer Publishing Co.,1980.
- Maultsby, M.C., "Rational Emotive Imagery: in Russell Greiger (ed.) Rational Emotive Psychotherapy: Handbook of Theory and Practice New York, N.Y: Springer Publishing Co., 1980.
- Maultsby, M.C., "Rational Behavior Therapy in Groups," pp. 169–206 in George M Gazda (ed.) Inno- vations to Group Psychotherapy (2nd Ed.) Springfield, Illinois: Charles C. Thomas,1981
- Maultsby, M.C., "Why American Blacks Distrust Psychiatrists," in Samuel M. Turner and Russell T. Jones (Eds.) Behavior Modification in Black Populations: Empirical Findings and Psychosocial Issues. New York, NY: Plenum Press, 1982.
- Maultsby, M.C., "Rational Behavior Therapy," in Samuel M. Turner and Russell T. Jones (Eds.) Behavior Modification in Black Populations: Empirical Findings as Psychosocial Issues. New York, N.Y. Plenum Press, 1982.
- Maultsby, M.C. and Gore, T.A. "Rational Behavior Therapy," Cognitive-Behavioral Approaches to Psychotherapy. W.Dryden and W. Golden (Eds.). London: Harper and Row 1986
- Maultsby, M.C., "Rational Behavior Therapy: An Approach to Transcultural Counseling." In John Mc.Faden (ed.) Transcultural Counseling. Alexandria, Virginia: American Counseling Association, 1993.
- Maultsby, M.C., and Wirga, M. "Behavior Therapy," pp. 221–234 in Friedman, H., ed., Encyclopedia of Mental Health, Vol.1, A-D, San Diego: Academic Press, 1998.
- Maultsby, M.C., "Taming the PIT-Monsters," in Favorite Counseling and Therapy Homework Assignments, Rosentahl, H. (ed.), Accelerated Development, Taylor S. Francis, Philadelphia, PA 2000.
