= Charles Rodrigues =

American cartoonist (1926–2004)

Charles Rodrigues (September 29, 1926 – June 14, 2004) was an American cartoonist perhaps best known as a contributor to National Lampoon.

== Biography ==
Rodrigues was born in New Bedford, Massachusetts; his father came from Madeira, Portugal, and his mother was a local woman of Portuguese descent. After a stint in the U.S. Navy, he read in Writer's Digest that a magazine entitled Country Gentleman was paying forty dollars for cartoons – then a large sum of money – and determined to become a cartoonist. With support from the G.I. Bill, he went to New York City to attend the Cartoonist and Illustrators School (now the School of Visual Arts). He began peddling his cartoons around 1950, selling at first to low-grade girlie magazines, then to Playboy, to which he would contribute continually for many years. From the 1950s onward, he worked for many magazines in varying genres, including Esquire, TV Guide, a Catholic publication called The Critic, and Paul Krassner's The Realist.

He began contributing to the National Lampoon as of its first issue in April 1970, and continued to do so until 1993. Although his politics differed sharply from those of the Lampoon's staff, the magazine provided a wide outlet for his sense of humor. Art director Michael Gross once said of him:

[L]ook at Charles Rodrigues. Almost nobody is as tasteless as Rodrigues can be. The man would deliver stuff that we would just cringe at. His first piece was the atrocious – and hilarious – "Hire the Handicapped".... In later years, I found out that he's a conservative, fairly religious, Portuguese artist who really thought we were awful people. [laughter] He hated our politics, but he was able to transcend that... so I could never figure out what his attitude was.

In a collection of interviews with various cartoonists, Mark Jacobs wrote:

He works at night, which is fitting, since some of his best cartoons deal with the dark side of the psyche. A classic black humorist, he rummages around in violence, insanity, perversion, bigotry and scatology, looking for what he needs to create the typical Rodrigues effect: wild laughter with a cringe of repulsion.

In the same book, Rodrigues told Jacobs:

People look upon cartoonists as a bunch of screwballs. They expect you to be on the roof, jumping up and down, throwing bags of water on people. This helps me to get away with murder in my conversation. I can say outrageous things to people. They expect it of me.

He was also a long-time contributor to Stereo Review, beginning with its first issue in 1958, and created three comic features for the Chicago Tribune-New York News Syndicate: Eggs Benedict, Casey the Cop, and the daily panel Charlie.

Charles Rodrigues died on June 14, 2004, at the age of 77. He was survived by his wife Lorraine and daughters Judith and Ann.

Two collections of Rodrigues's work were published during his lifetime: Spitting on the Sheriff and Other Diversions (Fawcett Gold Medal, 1966), which consists of cartoons from various men's magazines, and Total Harmonic Distortion (Perfectbound Press, 1988), which reprints his work from Stereo Review. He also drew cartoons for Defending the Undefendable (Fleet Press, 1976), a discourse by libertarian economist Walter Block. In 2013, Fantagraphics Books published Ray and Joe: The Story of a Dead Man and His Friend, and Other Classic Comics, a collection of his pages from National Lampoon. In late 2015, Fantagraphics published a second collection, Gag on This: The Scrofulous Cartoons of Charles Rodrigues, which collects gag cartoons from the Lampoon.

== Books ==
- Spitting On The Sheriff And Other Diversions: Delicious Black Humor By Charles Rodrigues (Fawcett pb, 1966)
- Total Harmonic Distortion: Cartoons From Stereo Review by Charles Rodrigues (Perfectbound Press tpb, 1988)
- Ray And Joe: The Story Of A Man And His Dead Friend And Other Classic Comics by Charles Rodrigues (Fantagraphics hc, 2013)
- Gag On This: The Scrofulous Cartoons Of Charles Rodrigues (Fantagraphics hc, 2015)
