= Mike Abrams (psychologist) =

American psychologist

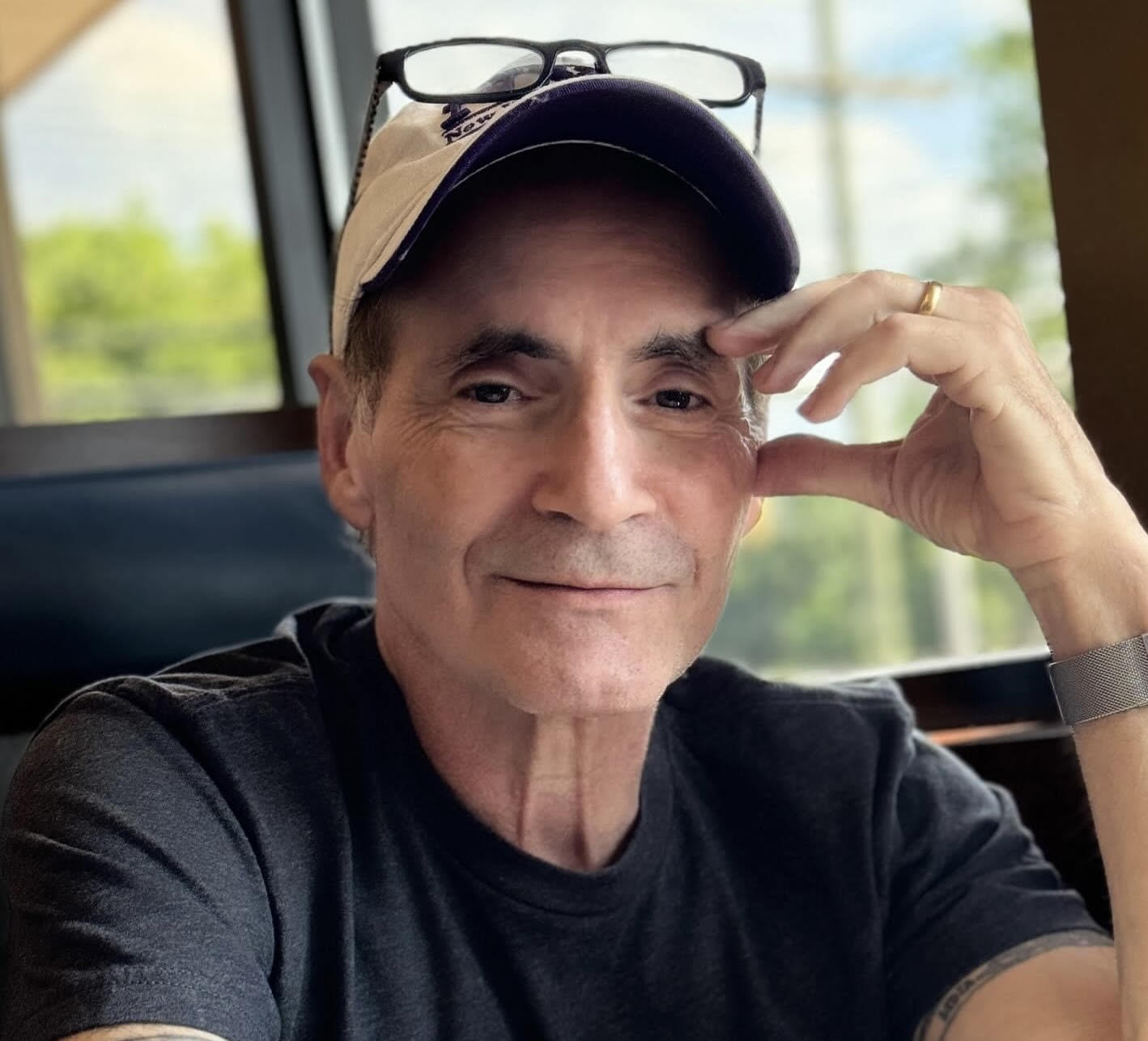
- Occupation: Clinical psychologist

Academic background
- Education: Queens College, City University of New York, B.A., History and College Administration; New York University Stern School of Business, MBA; City University of New York, Ph.D. in Psychology, 1987

Academic work
- Discipline: Clinical psychologist
- Institutions: New York University
- Main interests: Cognitive behavioral therapy

Mike Abrams is an American clinical psychologist, academic, and author specializing in cognitive behavioral therapy. He is an adjunct professor of psychology at New York University. Abrams studied and collaborated with Albert Ellis, focusing on rational emotive behavior therapy and co-authoring several books, including Personality Theories: Critical Perspectives.

Abrams has written on the integration of evolutionary psychology with psychotherapy, including Sexuality and Its Disorders: Development, Cases, and Treatment and The New CBT: Clinical Evolutionary Psychology.

== Early life and education ==
Abrams grew up in Queens, New York, in a working-class, Jewish family and attended local public schools. Early family experiences with psychiatric hospitals, including visits to a half-brother in care, influenced his decision to pursue psychology.

He completed a dual major in history and college administration at Queens College of the City University of New York before earning an MBA as a graduate teaching fellow at New York University Stern School of Business. After working several years in finance, he returned to graduate study and earned an advanced certificate in statistics, followed by a PhD in psychology from the City University of New York in 1987.

Abrams undertook additional clinical training, first with psychoanalyst Robert Langs and later in a postdoctoral program at Columbia University, and said that those studies "crystallized his conviction that psychoanalysis did not represent a scientifically based clinical theory or scientifically based basis for clinical practice."

Prior to his psychology career, Abrams worked at the New York Stock Exchange, Merrill Lynch, and Citibank.

== Career ==
In the early 1980s, Abrams was one of the non-gay psychologists who provided counseling to people with AIDS at the Gay Men's Health Crisis.

=== Work with Albert Ellis ===
In 1992, Abrams finished a two-year fellowship at the Albert Ellis Institute, where he began a long-term collaboration with Albert Ellis. During the fellowship, he also met psychologist Lidia Dengelegi Abrams, who later became his wife and collaborator. Abrams studied and collaborated with Ellis for 17 years, focusing on the extension of rational emotive behavior therapy into the study of human sexuality.

They worked together on several books and research, including the book Personality Theories: Critical Perspective, which was co-authored between Ellis, Abrams, and Lidia D. Abrams. In a 2009 interview, Abrams stated that the textbook resulted from his suggestion to Ellis that it was "essential for his legacy." He believed Ellis had "spent his career reaching out to clinicians and lay people; yet, he had not received the audience he warranted in academic settings." The textbook examines the major theories of personality across the history of psychology and presents a personality theory rooted in rational emotive behavior therapy, alongside religious, New Age, and non-Western traditions. A review in Contemporary Psychology: APA Review of Books described Personality Theories as broader in scope and more up-to-date than many of its competitors, noting its coverage of evolutionary approaches and non-Western traditions, although it criticized the textbook's organization.

Abram's 1992 book The Art & Science of Rational Eating, co-authored with Albert Ellis, presents background discussion of obesity, related case studies, and some practical guidance on weight loss. A review in the Journal of Cognitive Psychotherapy described it as "excellent for readers who are generally interested in learning about factors surrounding weight problems, dieting and eating behaviors," but cautioned that it is not recommended for readers only seeking a "how to lose weight" book. It noted that readers looking for a "sure-fire" may find the book falls short of its stated purpose, as much of its length is devoted to contextual information about obesity rather than methods for overcoming it.

In their 1994 book How to Cope with a Fatal Illness: The Rational Management of Death and Dying, Abrams and Ellis discuss the use of rational emotive behavior therapy to support individuals diagnosed with terminal illness. A review in the Journal of Contemporary Psychotherapy described it as "useful as a self-help tool for patients and their families who are confronting terminal and/or chronic illness."

=== Evolutionary psychology and Informed Cognitive Therapy ===
Following Ellis's death, Abrams continued their work, building on it by incorporating perspectives from evolutionary psychology. He authored Sexuality and Its Disorders: Development, Cases, and Treatment, in which he presents a Darwinian perspective on human sexuality. The book is structured around three themes: the historical context of sexual science, contemporary research on sexual functioning, and disordered behavior, including compulsive use of internet pornography. It includes interviews with figures in human sexuality and evolutionary psychology, case studies illustrating sexual disorders and their treatment, and an extensive bibliography. A review in Contemporary Psychology: APA Review of Books described the book as "a well-written, informed, and balanced overview of the psychology of sex from an evolutionary perspective" and recommended it not only to psychologists, physicians, psychiatrists, social workers, and other behavioral scientists, but also to the educated general public.

In 2021, Abrams published The New CBT: Clinical Evolutionary Psychology. The book explains how heredity and evolutionary processes shape all major DSM disorders, integrating behavioral genetics with cognitive behavioral therapy to provide a deeper understanding of mental health. Elizabeth Loftus noted that by integrating evolutionary psychology and behavioral genetics with core principles of cognitive behavioral therapy, the book provided new insights into reducing stress through changes in thought and behavior, while Joseph LeDoux said that it would serve as a valuable resource for both therapists and scientists seeking to connect research on brain and behavior to mental health problems and their treatment.

Abrams has also conducted research on early life abuse and its potential impact on adult sexual functioning.

Abrams is an adjunct professor of psychology at New York University. He has served on the editorial boards of several journals. In addition to his academic work, he has also practiced as a clinician in New York and New Jersey for more than three decades.

== Selected publications ==
- Ellis, Albert; Abrams, Mike (1992). The Art & Science of Rational Eating. Barricade Books. ISBN 978-0-942637-60-1
- Ellis, Albert; Abrams, Mike (1994). How to Cope with a Fatal Illness: The Rational Management of Death and Dying. Barricade Books. ISBN 978-1-56980-005-8
- Ellis, Albert; Abrams, Mike; Abrams, Lidia (2008). Personality Theories: Critical Perspectives. Sage Publishing. ISBN 978-1-4129-7062-4
- Abrams, Mike (2016). Sexuality and Its Disorders: Development, Cases, and Treatment, Sage Publishing. ISBN 978-1-4129-7880-4
- Abrams, Mike (2020). The New CBT: Clinical Evolutionary Psychology. Cognella Academic Publishing. ISBN 978-1-5165-2162-3
- Abrams, Mike, and Marija Milisavljević Grdinić (2025). Sexuality: Development, Cases, and Treatment. Cognella Academic Publishing. ISBN 979-8-8233-8217-5
