= Daniel Harkness =

- Citizenship: United States
- Education: PhD, LCSW
- Alma mater: University of Kansas
- Occupations: Professor; writer
- Writing career
- Language: English
- Notable work: Supervision in Social Work

Daniel Harkness is an author, professor, and licensed clinical social worker. Along with Alfred Kadushin, Harkness wrote Supervision in Social Work in 2002.

== Career ==
Since 1993, Harkness has been a tenured professor at Boise State University within the Social Work department. His specialties are addictions; clinical social work; codependence; educating and credentialing social workers; evaluation and treatment of mental disorders; and social work supervision. He previously earned his Bachelors, Masters, and PhD from the University of Kansas.

In 2014, the fifth edition of Supervision in Social Work was released by Columbia University Press.

He has written articles appearing in the Journal of Substance Abuse Treatment, The Clinical Supervisor, Alcoholism Treatment Quarterly, the Journal of Psychoactive Drugs, and has reviewed articles for The Journal of Sociology & Social Welfare.

== Personal life ==
Harkness married Harriet Hensley, daughter of Martha E. Hensley.
