= James Harkness =

James Harkness may refer to:

- James Harkness (mathematician) (1864–1923), Canadian mathematician
- James Harkness (minister) (1935–2026), Church of Scotland minister
- James Harkness (actor), Scottish actor
