= John Harkness =

John Harkness may refer to:

- John C. Harkness (1916–2016), American architect
- John Harkness (cricketer) (1867–1960), New Zealand cricketer
- Jack Harkness (footballer, born 1907) (John Diamond Harkness, 1907–1985), Scottish footballer
- John Granville Harkness (1831–1900), British Major-General during the Victorian era
- Steve Englehart, comic book writer who used pseudonym John Harkness
- John Harkness, a character in You're in the Navy Now

== See also ==
- Jack Harkness (disambiguation)
