= Charles Zastrow =

American social scientist

Charles Harold Zastrow (born 1942) is an American social scientist and Professor of Social Work at the George Williams College of the Aurora University, known for his work on the theory and practice of social work.

Zastrow took his studies at the University of Wisconsin-Madison, where he received his BS and MS in Psychology and in 1971 his PhD in Social Welfare under Alfred Kadushin with the thesis entitled "Outcome of Negro Children - Caucasian Parents Transracial Adoptions." After graduation Zastrow taught at the University of Wisconsin-Whitewater for 35 years, before moving to George Williams College of the Aurora University in 2007. In 2018 Zastrow won a NASW National Pioneer Award.

== Selected publications ==
- Charles Zastrow. The practice of social work. Brooks/Cole Publishing Company, 1995.
- Charles Zastrow and Lee H. Bowker. Social problems: Issues and solutions. Nelson-Hall Publishers, 1996.
- Charles Zastrow (2007). Introduction to Social Work and Social Welfare: Empowering People. Cengage Learning. ISBN 0495095109
- Charles Zastrow; Karen Kay Kirst-Ashman (2009). Understanding Human Behavior and the Social Environment. Cengage Learning. ISBN 978-0-495-60374-0.
- Charles Zastrow. The practice of social work 2009. 9th ed ISBN 978-1-4240-7975-9
- Charles Zastrow. Brooks/Cole Empowerment Series: Introduction to Social Work and Social Welfare. Cengage Learning, 2013.

Articles, a selection

- Zastrow, Charles H. "Cheating among College Graduate Students." Journal of Educational Research 64.4 (1970): 157–60.
- Zastrow, Charles. "Understanding and preventing burn-out." British Journal of Social Work 14.1 (1984): 141–155.
