= Jack Harkness (disambiguation) =

Jack Harkness is a character played by John Barrowman in Doctor Who and Torchwood.

Jack Harkness may also refer to:

- "Captain Jack Harkness" (Torchwood episode), an episode of Torchwood
  - Jack Harkness, played by Matt Rippy, a minor Torchwood character
- Jack Harkness (footballer, born 1907) (1907–1985), Scottish footballer
- Jack Harkness (footballer, born 2004), Scottish footballer
- Jack Harkness (1918–1994), rose breeder with Harkness Roses

== See also ==
- John Harkness (disambiguation)
