= Defending the Undefendable =

1976 book by Walter Block

- First edition
- Author: Walter Block
- Language: English
- Subject: Moral philosophy, political economy
- Publisher: Fleet Press
- Publication date: 1976
- Publication place: United States
- Media type: Print (Paperback)
- Pages: 256
- ISBN: 9781933550176
- OCLC: 248638106
- Dewey Decimal: 973.925
- LC Class: HB95 .B58
- Followed by: Defending the Undefendable II: Freedom in All Realms
- Text: Defending the Undefendable at Ludwig von Mises Institute

Defending the Undefendable is a 1976 book by American economist Walter Block. It has been translated into ten foreign languages. The book advances the thesis that various people are stigmatized for engaging in acts that are often illegal or disreputable yet do not involve violence or violation of property. Block further proposes these people may in fact benefit society. Each chapter examines a different type of person, including prostitutes, blackmailers, misers and litterers.

The original edition included illustrations by Charles Rodrigues and a foreword from Murray Rothbard, with commentary provided by F. A. Hayek.

The book's 2013 sequel, Defending the Undefendable II: Freedom in All Realms, included a foreword by Ron Paul.

== Reception ==
Economist Murray Rothbard thought that by emphasizing marginal scenarios, Defending the Undefendable "does far more to demonstrate the workability and morality of the free market than a dozen sober tomes on more respectable industries and activities. By testing and proving the extreme cases, he all the more illustrates and vindicates the theory."

Libertarian activist Sharon Presley had a more critical take, agreeing with large parts of it but calling it "a bizarre combination of both excellent and horrible elements". She offered some praise for its "valid economic and political analysis" but also criticized its "sensationalistic style", several instances of "faulty logic", and its overly "mechanistic and insensitive view of human behavior". She feared it might ultimately act to discredit the ideas it was meant to promote, concluding that it is "a positive menace to the libertarian movement and dramatically demonstrates Rand's statement that the worst enemies of capitalism are its defenders."

Cable news pundit John Stossel said of it, "Defending the Undefendable... opened my eyes to the beauties of libertarianism. It explains that so much of what is assumed to be evil – is not." In 2011, writing that economics "illuminates what common sense overlooks", Stossel called the book "eye-opening" and detailed its contents.

The philosopher Tibor Machan, who generally shared Block's libertarian leanings, wrote that the book "defends some of the silliest ideas in support of an essentially good cause... He raises some stimulating issues, even if in an intellectually inadequate fashion."
