= Rational behavior therapy =

Rational behavior therapy (RBT) is a form of cognitive behavioral therapy developed by psychiatrist Maxie Clarence Maultsby Jr., a professor at the Medical College at Howard University. RBT is designed to be a short term therapy which is based on discovering an unsuspected problem which creates unwanted mental, emotional and physical behaviors.

According to Maultsby, RBT addresses all three groups of learned behaviors directly: the cognitive, the emotive, and the physical. It also involves systematic guidance in the technique of emotional self-help called rational self-counseling. One of the features of rational behavior therapy is that the therapist assigns the client "therapeutic homework".

In Dr. Maultsby's book, Rational Behavior Therapy, he discusses the nine scientific approaches that are the foundation to this method:

1. The art and science of practicing family medicine.
2. Specialty training in adult and child psychiatry.
3. Neuropsychological theories of Donald Hebb and Alexander Luria.
4. Classical conditioning theory of Ivan Pavlov.
5. The operant learning theory of James G. Holland and B.F. Skinner.
6. Learning theories of Hobart Mowerer and Julian Rotter.
7. Conditioning and learning research of Clarence V. Hudgins, Mary Cover Jones, John I. Lacey, Robert L. Smith, Charles E. Osgood and George J. Such, Gregory H.S. Razran, Arthur W. Staats and Carolyn K. Staats, John B. Watson and Rosalie Rayner, Joseph Wolpe, and Arnold Lazarus.
8. Psychosomatic research of David T. Graham and William J. Grace.
9. Albert Ellis's theory and technique of Rational Emotive Therapy.

Some of the concepts of Rational Behavior Therapy is ABC Emotion scale, Five Rules for Healthy Thinking (5RHT), and Healthy Semantics. Both ABC and 5RHT creates Healthy Semantics. These concepts are used to help treat the patient. Another key component is Rational Self-analysis (RSA) which helps structure the patient. This is better known as being given a homework assignment that creates a routine for the patient. Rational Emotive Imagery (REI) is another concept used to create an essential learning of a habit to replace an old habit we no longer want.

== History ==
Rational behavior therapy is the result of four significant influences in Maultsby's professional life: his experience as a physician, the neuropsychology of Alexander Luria, B. F. Skinner's behavioral learning theory, and Albert Ellis's rational emotive behavior therapy. RBT is considered to be one of the first cognitive-behavior therapies that was developed specifically to be used as a self-counseling technique. It was Ellis who had the most significant impact on the development of RBT as a psychotherapy method. However, unlike Ellis's technique, RBT leaves philosophical issues to patients' individual preferences.
