= Alfred Kadushin =

American professor

Alfred Kadushin (September 19, 1916, New York City - February 5, 2014, Madison, Wisconsin) was a social worker and Julia C. Lathrop Distinguished Professor of Social Work at the University of Wisconsin-Madison.

== Biography ==
Born to Celia and Philip Kadushin, Jewish immigrants from Lithuania, he grew up in the Bronx. He went on to earn a master's degree from Columbia University and a Ph.D. from New York University.

== Career ==
Kadushin worked as a caseworker in New York City from 1947 to 1950 before teaching at the University of Wisconsin-Madison from 1950 until 1991.

He authored 66 journal articles and six books including Child Welfare Services (four editions were published and "provided the conceptual framework for the federal Adoption Assistance and Child Welfare Act of 1980"), The Social Work Interview, Supervision in Social Work and Consultation in Social Work.

== Awards, honors and recognition ==
He was one of only five social workers to be awarded a fellowship at the Center for Advanced Studies in the Behavioral Sciences, elected in 1983 as a Distinguished Scientist Associate in Social Work to the National Academies of Practice, and the recipient of NASW's Lifetime Achievement Award in 1993.
