= Alec =

- Gender: Male

Other names
- See also: Alek; Alex; Alexander

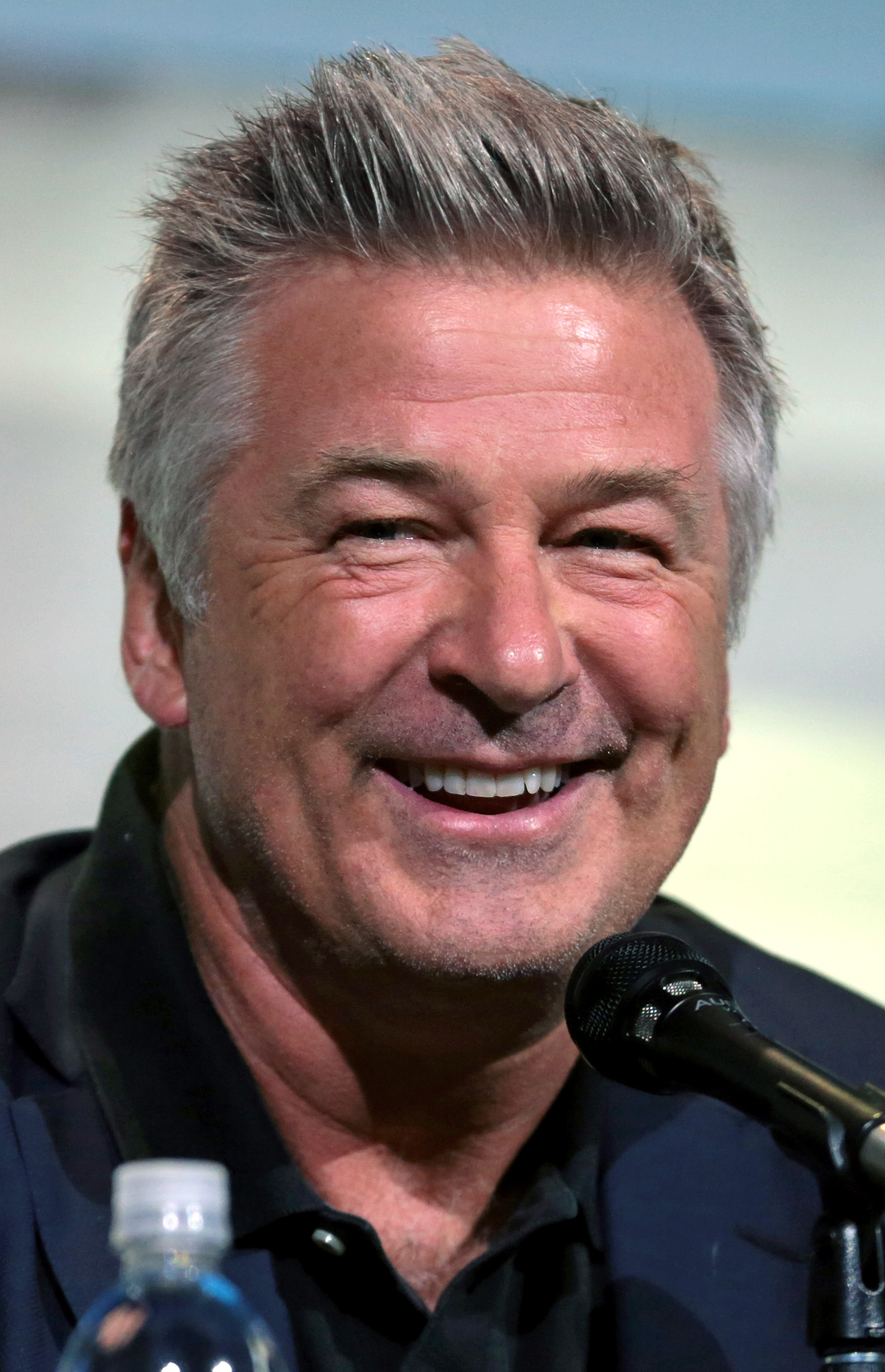
Alec Baldwin, whose name has the spelling.

Alec or Aleck is a Scottish form of the given name Alex. It may be a shortened form of the name Alexander or a given name in its own right. Notable people with the name include:

== People ==
- Alec Aalto (1942–2018), Finnish diplomat
- Alec Acton (1938–1994), English footballer
- Alec Albiston (1917–1998), Australian rules footballer
- Alec Alston (1937–2009), English footballer
- Alec and Peter Graham (1881–1957), New Zealand mountaineers, guides, and hotel operators
- Alec Anderson (American football, born 1894) (1894–1953), American NFL player
- Alec Anderson (American football, born 1999) (born 1999), American professional football player
- Alec Ash (born 1986), British writer and editor
- Alec Ashcroft (1887–1963), English international rugby union player
- Alec Asher (born 1991), American MLB player
- Alec Ashworth (1939–1995), English professional footballer
- Alec Astle (born 1949), New Zealand former cricketer
- Alec Atkinson (1919–2015), British Royal Air Force officer and civil servant
- Alec B. Francis (1867–1934), English silent-film actor
- Alec Bagot (1893–1968), South Australian adventurer, polemicist, and politician
- Alec Baillie (died 2020), American bassist
- Alec Baldwin (born 1958), American actor
- Alec Bangham (1921–2010), British biophysicist
- Alec Bartlett (born 1993), American soccer player
- Alec Bathgate, New Zealand musician
- Alec Bedser (1918–2010), English professional cricketer
- Alec Bedser (South African cricketer) (1948–1981), South African cricketer
- Alec Beechman (1896–1965), British barrister and politician
- Alec Benjamin (born 1994), American singer-songwriter
- Alec Bennett (1897–1973), Irish-Canadian motorcycle racer
- Alec Berg (born 1969 or 1970), American comedy and television writer of Swedish descent
- Alec Bettinger (born 1995), American MLB player
- Alec Birrell (1885–1948), Australian rules footballer, military personnel, and doctor
- Alec Birtwell (1908–1974), English cricketer
- Alec Bishop (1897–1984), British Army officer and administrator
- Alec Blakeman (1918–1994), English professional footballer
- Alec Boden (1925–2011), Scottish footballer
- Alec Bohm (born 1996), American MLB player
- Alec Bonnett (1922–1992), British sports shooter
- Alec Boswell Timms (1872–1922), Australian-born international rugby union player
- Alec Brader (1942–2024), English professional footballer, schoolteacher, and youth athletics coach
- Alec Brady (1870–1913), Scottish professional footballer
- Alec Bregonzi (1930–2006), English actor
- Alec Briggs (born 1939), English former professional footballer
- Alec Broers, Baron Broers (born 1938), British electrical engineer
- Alec Brook (1911–1986), English international table tennis player
- Alec Brook-Krasny (born 1958), American politician
- Alec Brown (born 1992), American professional basketball player
- Alec Brown (snooker player) (1908–1995), English snooker player
- Alec Brownstein (born 1980), American creative marketer, writer, and film director
- Alec Burgess (1906–1990), English cricketer
- Alec Burks (born 1991), American NBA player
- Alec Burleson (born 1998), American MLB player
- Alec Burns (runner) (1907–2003), English track and field athlete
- Alec Burns (cricketer) (born 1948), Trinidad and Tobago former cricketer
- Alec Butler (born 1959), Canadian playwright
- Alec C. Snowden (1901–1983), British film producer
- Alec Cairncross (1911–1998), Scottish economist
- Alec Cameron (disambiguation), several people
- Alec Campbell (disambiguation), several people
- Alec Cannon, English footballer
- Alec Carruthers Gould (1870–1948), English illustrator and landscape- and marine painter
- Alec Chamberlain (born 1964), English former professional footballer
- Alec Cheyne (1907–1983), Scottish footballer
- Alec Chien, classical pianist from Hong Kong
- Alec Christie, British writer, film producer, and actor
- Alec Clarey (born 1994), English rugby union player
- Alec Clarke (1904–1959), South African cricketer
- Alec Clegg (1909–1986), English educationalist
- Alec Cleland (born 1970), Scottish professional footballer and coach
- Alec Clifton-Taylor (1907–1985), English architectural historian
- Alec Clunes (1912–1970), English actor and theatrical manager
- Alec Clydesdale (1875–1947), Australian politician
- Alec Cobbe (born 1945), Irish designer, artist, musical instrument collector, and decorator
- Alec Coles (born 1959), British-Australian art curator
- Alec Connell (1900–1958), Canadian NHL player
- Alec Cooke, Baron Cooke of Islandreagh (1920–2007), Irish politician and Royal Navy officer
- Alec Coombes (born 1995), Scottish rugby union player
- Alec Coppel (1907–1972), Australian-born screenwriter, novelist, and playwright
- Alec Coppen (1923–2019), British psychiatrist
- Alec Coryton (1895–1981), British Air Force commander
- Alec Cowan (born 1996), Canadian cyclist
- Alec Coxon (1916–2006), English cricketer
- Alec Craig (1884–1945), Scottish actor
- Alec Crikis (1944–2016), Australian sports shooter
- Alec Croft (born 1937), English former professional footballer
- Alec Crozier (1904–1974), Australian rules footballer
- Alec Cunningham (1905–1981), English cricketer
- Alec Cunningham-Reid (1895–1977), British military personnel
- Alec Dankworth (born 1960), English jazz musician
- Alec David Young (1913–2005), British aeronautical engineer
- Alec Davies (born 1962), Scottish former cricketer and current physical education teacher
- Alec Davies (footballer) (1920–1998), Scottish footballer
- Alec Debnam (1921–2003), English cricketer and Royal Air Force member
- Alec de Candole (1897–1918), English poet and military personnel
- Alec Denton (born 1994), English footballer
- Alec Devon Kreider (1991–2017), American murderer
- Alec Dick (footballer) (1865–1925), Scottish footballer
- Alec Dickson (1914–1994), British activist and V.S.O. founder
- Alec Distaso (1948–2009), American MLB player
- Alec Dockar (1920–1994), English professional rugby league footballer
- Alec Donald (1900–1952), Scottish professional footballer
- Alec Douglas (1939–2014), South African cricketer
- Alec Douglas-Home (1903–1995), British politician, Prime Minister of the U.K. (1963–1964)
- Alec Down (1914–1995), British archaeologist
- Alec Duckart (born 2000), American singer-songwriter
- Alec Duffy (born 1975), American writer and theater director
- Alec Dufty (born 1987), American former soccer player and current coach
- Alec Eason (1889–1956), Australian rules footballer, coach, and administrator
- Alec Eist (1929–1982), British police officer and Navy personnel
- Alec Elliot (born 1996), Canadian competitive Paralympic swimmer
- Alec Empire (born 1972), German musician
- Alec Epis (born 1937), Australian former footballer
- Alec Erwin (born 1948), South African politician
- Alec Evans (born 1939), Australian former rugby union footballer and coach
- Alec Farley (1925–2010), English professional footballer
- Alec Farmer (1908–1986), Scottish professional footballer
- Alec Farrall (1936–2025), English former professional footballer
- Alec Farrow (1894–1955), Australian rules footballer
- Alec Fildes (1901–1976), English professional rugby league footballer
- Alec Finlay (born 1966), Scottish artist
- Alec Finn (1944–2018), British musician
- Alec Firth (1892–?), British trade union official
- Alec Fischer, documentary filmmaker and LGBTQ+ advocate based in Minneapolis, Minnesota
- Alec Foege, American author and magazine journalist
- Alec Fong Lim (1931–1990), Australian politician
- Alec Fraser (disambiguation), several people
- Alec Fyfe (1909–1973), Australian rules footballer
- Alec G. Olson (born 1930), American politician
- Alec Gallimore, American aerospace engineer
- Alec Gallup (1928–2009), American pollster
- Alec Gambling (1926–2021), British electrical engineer
- Alec Garnett, American politician
- Alec Gaskell (1932–2014), English professional footballer
- Alec Geddes (1888–1964), Scottish communist activist
- Alec George Horwood (1914–1944), British soldier
- Alec Georgen (born 1998), French professional footballer
- Alec Gibson (born 1963), American former NFL player
- Alec Gillies (1875–1932), Scottish footballer
- Alec Glassey (1887–1970), British politician
- Alec Glen, Scottish amateur footballer
- Alec Gletzer (born 1991), American former international rugby union player
- Alec Gores (born 1953), American billionaire businessman
- Alec Graham (1929–2021), English Anglican bishop
- Alec Grant (1893–1966), New Zealand cricketer and military personnel of Australian descent
- Alec Gray (disambiguation), several people
- Alec Greven, American self-help author
- Alec Grieve (1864–1933), Dundee artist
- Alec Guinness (1914–2000), English actor
- Alec Hall (Australian footballer) (1869–1953), Australian rules footballer
- Alec Hall (English footballer) (1909–1992), English footballer
- Alec Hannan (1916–2002), South African boxer
- Alec Hansen (born 1994), American former baseball player
- Alec Hardie (1900–1975), Scottish professional footballer
- Alec Hardinge, 2nd Baron Hardinge of Penshurst (1894–1960), British Army personnel
- Alec Hardy (1891–1970), Anglican bishop
- Alec Harper (1910–2003), English polo player and Indian Army officer
- Alec Harris (1897–1974), Welsh spiritualist medium
- Alec Hastilow (1895–1975), English cricketer and cricket administrator
- Alec Head (1924–2022), French horse trainer and breeder
- Alec Hearne (1863–1952), English cricketer
- Alec Hellewell (1880–1934), English footballer
- Alec Hepburn (born 1993), English rugby union player
- Alec Herd (1911–1982), Scottish professional footballer
- Alec Higgins (1908–1965), English professional rugby league footballer
- Alec Hill (1916–2008), Australian military historian and academic
- Alec Holowka (1983–2019), Canadian game programmer, designer, and musician
- Alec Hooper (1900–1978), English professional footballer
- Alec Horsley (1902–1993), British businessman, Quaker, and peace activist
- Alec Horwood (1914–1944), British Army officer
- Alec Hosie (1890–1957), English cricketer
- Alec Howie (1913–1940), Indian Army cricketer and British Army personnel
- Alec Hurley (1871–1913), English music hall singer
- Alec Hurwood (1902–1982), Australian cricketer
- Alec Inch (1915–1994), Australian engine driver and politician
- Alec Ingold (born 1996), American NFL player
- Alec Ingwersen (1941–2016), Australian rules footballer
- Alec Issigonis (1906–1988), Greek-British car designer
- Alec Jackson, several people
- Alex Jackson (disambiguation), several people
- Alec James (cricketer) (1889–1961), Welsh cricketer
- Alec Jason (1911–2000), English actor
- Alec Jeffreys (born 1950), British geneticist
- Alec Jenkins (born 1987), Welsh rugby union player
- Alec John Dawson (1872–1951), English author
- Alec John Such (1951–2022), American bassist, former member of Bon Jovi
- Alec Johnson (born 1944), English former cricketer
- Alec Johnson (rugby league) (1901–?), Australian rugby league footballer
- Alec Jones (1924–1983), British politician
- Alec Julian Tyndale-Biscoe (1906–1997), English naval engineer and officer
- Alec K. Redfearn, American musician and composer
- Alec Kann (born 1990), American MLS player
- Alec Kaplan (1890–1963), South African philatelist
- Alec Karakatsanis (born 1983), American civil rights lawyer, social justice advocate, public defender, and prison reformer
- Alec Kay (1879–1917), Scottish professional footballer and military personnel
- Alec Kellaway (1894–1973), Australian actor of South African descent
- Alec Kennedy (1891–1959), Scottish cricketer
- Alec Kerr (1876–1953), New Zealand cricketer
- Alec Kessler (1967–2007), American basketball player and orthopedic surgeon
- Alec King (1874–1954), Australian rules footballer and officer
- Alec Kirkbride (1897–1978), British diplomat
- Alec Kirkland (1900–?), Irish footballer
- Alec Kitson (1921–1997), British trade unionist and official
- Alec Knight (1939–2023), British chaplain
- Alec Knight (cricketer) (1899–1986), New Zealand cricketer
- Alec Kruger (1924–2015), Australian non-fiction writer
- Alec Lamont (1850–1934), English barrister
- Alec Lanham-Love (born 1961), South African sailor
- Alec Law (1910–?), Scottish professional footballer
- Alec Lazenby (born 1927), English-born Australian academic and writer
- Alec Lazo, Cuban-American ballroom dancer
- Alec Lemon (born 1991), American former football player
- Alec Leonce (born 1962), British bobsledder
- Alec Leslie (1900–1961), Scottish professional footballer
- Alec Lewis (1920–2013), English international rugby union player
- Alec Lindsay (born 1948), English former footballer
- Alec Lindstrom (born 1998), American football player
- Alec Linwood (1920–2003), Scottish footballer
- Alec Logan (1882–1918), Scottish footballer
- Alec Longstreth (born 1979), American comics creator and illustrator
- Alec Lorimer (1896–?), Scottish footballer and ASL player
- Alec Lorimore (born 1948), American film director, film producer, and screenwriter
- Alec Lucas (born 1945), Welsh former professional footballer
- Alec Luyckx (born 1995), Belgian professional footballer
- Alec MacKaye (born 1966), American punk vocalist
- Alec Mackie (Irish footballer) (1903–1984), Irish footballer
- Alec Mackie (Scottish footballer), Scottish footballer
- Alec Mango (1911–1989), English actor
- Alec Mann (1902–?), English professional snooker player
- Alec Mapa (born 1965), Filipino-American actor
- Alec Marantz (born 1959), American linguist and researcher
- Alec Marks (1910–1983), Australian cricketer
- Alec Marr, Australian environmentalist
- Alec Marsh (born 1998), American MLB player
- Alec Martinez (born 1987), American NHL player
- Alec Mathieson (1921–2022), Australian rules former footballer
- Alec Mawhinney (1894–1967), Australian rules footballer
- Alec Mazo (born 1978), Belarusian American producer and former professional dancer
- Alec McCartney (1879–1968), Irish international footballer
- Alec McClure (1892–1971), English professional footballer
- Alec McCowen (1925–2007), English actor
- Alec McCue (1927–1989), Scottish professional footballer
- Alec McDonald (disambiguation), several people
- Alec McHoul (born 1952), Anglo-Australian ethnomethodologist
- Alec McKenzie (1882–1968), Australian rules footballer
- Alec McLean (born 1950), New Zealand former rower
- Alec McNair (1882–1951), Scottish footballer and manager
- Alec Mercer (1891–1977), English footballer
- Alec Merrison (1924–1989), British physicist
- Alec Mildren (1915–1998), Australian racing driver
- Alec Mills (born 1991), American MLB player
- Alec Mills (soccer) (born 2000), Australian professional footballer
- Alec Milne (born 1937), Scottish former professional footballer
- Alec Milne (footballer, born 1889) (1889–1970), English footballer
- Alec Monk (born 1942), British businessman and brewer
- Alec Monopoly (born 1980s), American graffiti artist and DJ
- Alec Monteath (1941–2021), Scottish television actor and broadcaster
- Alec Monteith (1886–1972), New Zealand politician, farmer, and trade unionist
- Alec Moores (1919–2014), Canadian politician
- Alec Morgan (1908–1957), Australian rules footballer
- Alec Morris (fl. 1910s), New Zealand professional rugby league footballer
- Alec Moyse (1935–1994), English footballer
- Alec Mudimu (born 1995), Zimbabwean footballer
- Alec Muffett (born 1968), Anglo-American internet-security evangelist, architect, and software engineer
- Alec Mullen (born 1966), Scottish former boxer
- Alec Musser (1973–2024), American fitness model and actor
- Alec Mutch (1889–1960), Australian rules footballer and umpire
- Alec N. Wildenstein (1940–2008), French-born American billionaire businessman, art dealer, racehorse owner, and breeder
- Alec Năstac (born 1949), Romanian boxer and Olympic medalist
- Alec Naylor Dakin (1912–2003), English Egyptologist, cryptographer, and schoolmaster
- Alec Neill (born 1950), New Zealand politician
- Alec Nevala-Lee (born 1980), American novelist, biographer, and science fiction writer
- Alec Newman (born 1974), Scottish actor
- Alec Ogilvie (1882–1962), British early aviation pioneer
- Alec Ogilvie (businessman) (1913–1997), British business executive
- Alec Ogletree (born 1991), American NFL player
- Alec O'Hanley, member of Two Hours Traffic
- Alec O'Leary, Irish musician and director
- Alec Olney (1922–2017), British long-distance runner
- Alec O'Riordan (born 1940), Irish former cricketer
- Alec Ormiston (1884–1952), Scottish footballer
- Alec Ounsworth (born 1977), American singer-songwriter and guitarist
- Alec Oxenford, Argentine entrepreneur
- Alec Page (born 1993), Canadian former competitive swimmer
- Alec Pantaleo (born 1996), American wrestler
- Alec Parker (born 1974), American former rugby union player
- Alec Parker (cricketer) (born 1955), Australian cricketer
- Alec Peak (1916–1997), Australian rules footballer
- Alec Pearce (1910–1982), English cricketer
- Alec Pecker (1893–1975), British painter
- Alec Penstone (born 1925), British World War II veteran
- Alec Peters (born 1995), American NBA player
- Alec Peterson (1908–1988), British educator, founder of the International Baccalaureate
- Alec Pierce (born 2000), American football player
- Alec Poitevint (born 1947), American politician
- Alec Poole (born 1943), Irish racing driver
- Alec Potts (born 1996), Australian competitive archer
- Alec Price (cricketer) (1913–1999), Australian cricketer
- Alec Proudfoot (1906–1995), Australian rules footballer
- Alec Purdie (born 1988), American soccer player
- Alec Puro (born 1975), American musician, songwriter, and composer
- Alec R. Costandinos (born 1944), French composer, music producer, and singer-songwriter
- Alec Rasizade (born 1947), Azerbaijani-American retired professor
- Alec Rauhauser (born 1995), American ice hockey player
- Alec Rayme (born 1978), American actor
- Alec Reed (born 1934), English business writer, philanthropist, and humanist
- Alec Reeves (1902–1971), British scientist
- Alec Regula (born 2000), American NHL player
- Alec Reid (1931–2013), Irish Catholic priest
- Alec Reid (footballer) (1897–1969), Scottish footballer
- Alec Reid (rugby union) (1878–1952), South African international rugby union player
- Alec Riddolls (1908–1963), New Zealand cricketer
- Alec Robertson (disambiguation), several people
- Alec Rodger (1907–1982), British occupational psychologist
- Alec Rose (1908–1991), English nursery owner and fruit merchant
- Alec Ross (disambiguation), several people
- Alec Roth (born 1948), English composer
- Alec Rowley (1892–1958), English composer, organist, pianist, lecturer, and music writer
- Alec Roxburgh (1910–1985), English professional footballer
- Alec Russell, English journalist
- Alec Ryrie (born 1971), British historian of religion, Anglican, and writer
- Alec Sabin (born 1947), British actor
- Alec Scheiner (born 1973), American attorney and private equity investor
- Alec Scott (1906–1978), British horse rider
- Alec Secăreanu (born 1984), Romanian stage, television, and film actor
- Alec Sehon (1924–2018), Romanian-born Canadian immunologist
- Alec Seward (1901–1972), American singer-songwriter and guitarist
- Alec Shankly, Scottish professional footballer
- Alec Shelbrooke (born 1976), British politician
- Alec Shellogg (1914–1968), American NFL player
- Alec Shepperson (born 1936), English amateur golfer
- Alec Skelding (1886–1960), English cricketer and umpire
- Alec Skempton (1914–2001), British civil engineer
- Alec Sloan (1870–1938), Australian rules footballer
- Alec Smight (born 1959), American film editor and television director
- Alec Smith (disambiguation), several people
- Alec Snow (born 1945), Canadian businessperson and former politician
- Alec Sokolow (born 1965), American screenwriter
- Alec Soth (born 1969), American photographer
- Alec Southwell (1926–2018), Australian judge
- Alec Spalding (1923–2007), British radar operator and agricultural economist
- Alec Stander (born 1979), South African cricketer
- Alec Statham (1912–1977), British speedway rider
- Alec Stevens (born 1965), Brazilian-born American author, illustrator, and musician
- Alec Stewart (disambiguation), several people
- Alec Stock (1917–2001), English footballer and manager
- Alec Stokes (1919–2003), British physicist
- Alec Stone Sweet, American political scientist and jurist
- Alec Su (born 1973), Taiwanese musician and actor
- Alec Sulkin (born 1973), American writer, producer, and voice actor
- Alec Sundly (born 1992), American soccer player
- Alec Sutherland (1922–2014), Scottish swimmer, swimming coach, mountain climber, and airman
- Alec Swann (born 1976), English former cricketer
- Alec Talbot (1902–1975), English footballer
- Alec Tayler (1892–1964), Australian rules footballer
- Alec Taylor (disambiguation), several people
- Alec Templeton (1909–1963), British composer
- Alec Tennant, Australian former professional rugby league footballer
- Alec Thomas (1894–?), Canadian fisherman, trapper, longshoreman, logger, interpreter, anthropologist, and politician
- Alec Thompson (1916–2001), English cricketer
- Alec Thomson (1873–1953), English-born Australian politician
- Alec Thomson (footballer) (1901–1975), Scottish footballer
- Alec Thurlow (1922–1956), English footballer
- Alec Tidey (born 1955), Canadian former NHL player
- Alec Tod (1898–1977), British equestrian
- Alec Torelli (born 1987), American poker player
- Alec Trendall (1928–2013), English geologist, poet, and explorer
- Alec Troup (1909–?), Scottish professional rugby league footballer
- Alec Udell (born 1995), American racing driver
- Alec Urosevski (born 1994), Australian footballer
- Alec Utgoff (born 1986), Soviet-born English actor
- Alec Valentine (1928–1997), Scottish international rugby union footballer
- Alec Van Hoorenbeeck (born 1998), Belgian footballer
- Alec Vary (1908–1977), Australian rules footballer
- Alec Vidler (1899–1991), English Anglican priest, theologian, and ecclesiastical historian
- Alec Vinci (born 1999), Australian professional footballer
- Alec Wainman (1913–1989), British photographer, Quaker, and Slavonic scholar
- Alec Wales (1916–1975), British gymnast
- Alec Wallace (1872–1950), English professional footballer
- Alec Waterman (born 1996), Australian rules footballer
- Alec Watson (cricketer) (1844–1920), Scottish first-class cricketer
- Alec Waugh (1898–1981), British novelist
- Alec Wilder (1907–1980), American composer
- Alec Wilkinson (born 1952), American writer
- Alec Wills (1911–1941), English cricketer and Royal Air Force officer
- Alec Wintering (born 1995), American basketball player
- Alec Wood (1933–2016), Australian mycologist
- Alec Woodall (1918–2011), British Labour Party politician
- Alec Worcester (1887–1952), British stage and silent film actor
- Alec Yoder (born 1997), American artistic gymnast
- Alec Young (1925–2010), Scottish footballer and coach
- Alec Zumwalt (born 1981), American professional baseball hitting coach
- Anthony Seibu Alec Abban (1928–1985), Ghanaian politician
- Buck Alec (1901–1995), Northern Irish boxer, Ulster loyalist paramilitary and Ulster Special Constabulary (USC) reservist.

== Fiction ==
- Alec, protagonist in Lonely Freddy, the second story in Five Nights at Freddy's Fazbear Frights 2: Fetch.
- Alec the Great, American newspaper comic strip
- Alec Forbes of Howglen, Scottish novel by George MacDonald
- Alec: A Novel, 2021 continuation of Maurice (1975)
- Alec Gilroy, fictional character in Coronation Street
- Alec of Kerry, fictional character in The Nightrunner Series by Lynn Flewelling
- Alec Lightwood, fictional character in The Shadowhunter Chronicles
- Alec Mason, fictional character in Red Faction: Guerilla
- Alec McDowell, fictional character in Dark Angel
- Alec McEwan, fictional character in Journey to the Center of the Earth
- Alec Trevelyan, fictional character in GoldenEye
- Alec of the Volturi coven in the Twilight saga by Stephenie Meyer
- Alec Ramsay, fictional character in The Black Stallion books and movies
- Alec Ryder father of protagonist in Mass Effect Andromeda
- Alec D'Urberville, fictional character in Tess of the d'Urbervilles by Thomas Hardy
- Alec Scudder, fictional character in Maurice by E. M. Forster
- DI Alec Hardy, fictional character in the Broadchurch TV show by Chris Chibnall
- Alec Holland, fictional character in the Swamp Thing comic series
- Alec Vasil, fictional character in Worm (web serial)

== See also ==
- Alec Hunter Academy, British school
- American Legislative Exchange Council, nonprofit organization of conservative state legislators and private sector representatives
- Alek, given name
