= Alex (disambiguation) =

Alex is a unisex given name.

Alex may also refer to:

== People with the given name ==
- Alex (actor) (1959–2011), Indian actor and magician
- Alex (footballer, born 1975), Brazilian footballer
- Alex (footballer, born 1977), Brazilian footballer
- Alex (footballer, born 1979), Portuguese footballer
- Alex (footballer, born January 1982), Brazilian-Armenian footballer
- Alex (footballer, born February 1982), Brazilian footballer
- Alex (footballer, born March 1982), Brazilian footballer
- Alex (footballer, born June 1982), Brazilian footballer
- Alex (footballer, born 1983), Brazilian footballer
- Alex (footballer, born February 1988), Wesley Alex Maiolino, Brazilian football forward
- Alex (footballer, born December 1988), Alexandre Monteiro de Lima, Brazilian football midfielder
- Alex (footballer, born 1989), Brazilian footballer
- Alex (footballer, born 20 May 1990), Alex dos Santos Gonçalves, Brazilian football forward
- Alex (footballer, born August 1990), Brazilian footballer
- Alex (footballer, born 1999), Brazilian footballer
- Alessandro Santos (born 1977), Japanese footballer, better known as "Alex"

== People with the surname ==
- Elizabeth Alex, American television news anchor
- Francisco Alex (born 1983), Brazilian footballer
- Jacqueline Alex (born 1965), German swimmer

== Places ==
- Alex, Haute-Savoie, France
- Alex, Oklahoma, US
- Alex (restaurant), Las Vegas, US

== Film and TV ==
- Alex (film), a 1992 New Zealand/Australia film
- "Alex" (Supergirl episode), an episode of American TV Series Supergirl
- AleX, an Italian TV series
- Alex, Inc., an American sitcom

== Other uses ==
- Alex (album), a 2025 album by Daughter of Swords
- Alex (automobile), an early British automobile
- Alex (comic strip), British newspaper comic strip
- Alex (moth), a genus of moth
- Alex (novel series), 1987–1992 series of novels by Tessa Duder
- Alex (parrot), talking African gray parrot studied by psychologist Irene Pepperberg
- Alex (sniper rifle), a Polish sniper rifle (Bor)
- Alex (software), a lexer generator written in Haskell
- Alex (Lemaitre novel), a 2013 novel by Pierre Lemaitre
- Alex (videotex service), by Bell Canada in the early 1990s
- Alex eReader, an e-book reader
- Joe Alex, pen name of Polish writer Krzysztof Soroczynski
- alex, a subsidiary of the German railway company Die Länderbahn
- Alex (Minecraft), a character in the video game Minecraft
- Tropical Storm Alex (disambiguation), a number of named tropical cyclones
- Storm Alex, a 2020 extratropical cyclone in Europe
- Alex, nickname of Ahn Jiwon, protagonist of the Boys' love Korean webcomic BJ Alex by MinGwa
- AlexNet, a groundbreaking neural network from 2012

== See also ==
- Alec, given name
- Alek, given name
- ALEKS, tutoring and assessment program
