= Birtwell =

Birtwell is a surname. Notable people with the surname include:

- Alec Birtwell (1908–1974), English cricketer
- Celia Birtwell (born 1941), British textile and fashion designer
- Ian Birtwell (born 1944), English rugby player and coach
- S. A. Birtwell (c. 1846–1897), English vegetarianism activist

== See also ==
- Andrena birtwelli, also known as the Birtwell's miner bee, a species of miner bee
- Bertwell, an unincorporated community in Saskatchewan, Canada
