= Howard Kerr =

Howard Kerr may refer to:

- "Howard Kerr", pseudonym of Alec John Dawson (1872-1952), English novelist
- Howard Hillen Kerr (1900-1984), first principal of what was then Ryerson Polytechnical Institute
