= Allen Kerr =

Allen Kerr may refer to:

- Allen Kerr (biologist)
- Allen Kerr (cricketer)
- Allen Kerr (politician)
