= Alexander Robertson =

Alexander or Alex Robertson may refer to:

== Law and politics ==
- Alexander Robertson of Glasgowego (1703–1775), Scottish politician
- Alexander Robertson (MP) (1779–1856), British politician
- Alexander Robertson (New York politician) (1825–1902), American politician
- Alexander Robertson (Canadian politician) (1838–1888), Canadian lawyer and politician
- Alexander Rocke Robertson (1841–1881), Canadian politician
- Alexander Black Robertson (1847–1920), Canadian politician
- Alexander D. Robertson (1849–1921), Canadian politician
- Alexander George Morison Robertson (1867–1947), American jurist in Hawaii
- Sir Alexander Robertson (police officer) (1896–1970), British police officer

== Sports ==
- Alexander Robertson (rugby union) (1848–1913), Scottish rugby union player
- Alex Robertson (Scottish footballer) (fl. 1902–1903), Scottish footballer
- Alex Robertson (Australian rules footballer) (1887–1915), Australian rules footballer
- Alex Robertson (soccer, born 2003), Australian soccer player

== Others ==
- Alexander Robertson of Struan (c. 1670–1749), Scottish Jacobite soldier
- Alexander Robertson (artist) (1772–1841), Scottish-American painter and engraver
- Alexander Cunningham Robertson (1816–1884), British military general
- Alexander Robertson (shipwright) (1851–1937), Scottish shipwright
- Eck Robertson (Alexander Robertson, 1887–1975), American fiddle player
- Alexander Robertson (chemist) (1896–1970), British chemist
- Sir Alexander Robertson (veterinary surgeon) (1908–1990), Scottish veterinarian
- Alexander Provan Robertson (1925–1995), Scottish mathematician

== Other uses ==
- Alexander Robertson & Sons, British boat building company

== See also ==
- Sandy Robertson (disambiguation)
- Alec Robertson (disambiguation)
