= Alexander Knight =

Alexander Knight may refer to:

- Alec Knight (cricketer) (1899–1986), New Zealand cricketer
- Alexander Knight (politician) (1924–1985), Australian politician
- Alec Knight (1939–2023), English Anglican clergyman, Dean of Lincoln
