= Riddolls =

Riddolls may refer to:

- Alec Riddolls (1908–1963), New Zealand cricketer
- Mount Riddolls, mountain in Antarctica
