= Alek =

- Gender: Unisex

Other names
- See also: Alec; Alex; Alexander

Alek is a given name and alternative form of Alec. Notable people with the name include:

- Alek Bédard (born 1996), Canadian curler
- Alek D. Epstein (born 1975), Russian-Israeli sociologist of culture and politics
- Alek Dzhabrailov (1976–2009), Chechen human rights activist
- Alek Keshishian (born 1964), Armenian-American film and commercial director, writer, and producer
- Alek Manoah (born 1998), American baseball pitcher
- Alek Manolov (born 1986), Bulgarian footballer
- Alek Minassian (born 1992), Canadian murder suspect
- Alek Osmanović (born 1982), Croatian bobsledder
- Alek Popov (born 1966), Bulgarian novelist, writer, essayist and scriptwriter
- Alek Rapoport (1933–1997), Russian Nonconformist artist, art theorist and teacher
- Alek Sandar (born 1987), Bulgarian music producer, songwriter and recording artist
- Alek Skarlatos (born 1992), American actor and US Army National Guard soldier
- Alek Stojanov (born 1973), Canadian ice hockey player
- Alek Thomas (born 2000), American MLB player
- Alek Torgersen (born 1995), American football quarterback
- Alek Wek (born 1977), South Sudanese-British model and designer
- Alek Noormae (born 2007), American musician, frontman of "Michigan"

== See also ==
- Alec, given name
