= General Robertson =

General Robertson may refer to:

- Alexander Cunningham Robertson (1816–1884), British Army general
- Beverly Robertson (1827–1910), Confederate States Army brigadier general
- Brian Robertson, 1st Baron Robertson of Oakridge (1896–1974), British Army general
- Charles T. Robertson Jr. (born 1946), U.S. Air Force general
- Donn J. Robertson (1916–2000), U.S. Marine Corps lieutenant general
- Felix Huston Robertson (1839–1928), Confederate States Army brigadier general
- Horace Robertson (1894–1960), Australian Army lieutenant general
- Ian Robertson (British Army officer) (1913–2010), British Army major general
- James Robertson (Australian Army officer) (1878–1951), Australian Army brigadier general
- James Robertson (British Army officer) (1717–1788) was a British Army lieutenant general
- Jerome B. Robertson (1815–1890), Confederate States Army brigadier general
- Jim Robertson (British Army officer) (1910–2004), British Army major general
- Philip Robertson (British Army officer) (1866–1936), British Army major general
- Walter M. Robertson (1888–1954), U.S. Army major general
- Sir William Robertson, 1st Baronet (1860–1933), British Army general

== See also ==
- Attorney General Robertson (disambiguation)
