= Alex Jackson =

Alex or Alexander Jackson may refer to:

- A. Y. Jackson (1882–1974), Canadian painter and founding member of the Group of Seven
- Alex Jackson (footballer, born 1905) (1905–1946), Scottish international footballer (Aberdeen, Huddersfield Town, Chelsea)
- Alex Jackson (footballer, born 1935) (born 1935), Scottish footballer (Birmingham City)
- Alexandra Jackson (born 1952), Irish swimmer
- Alexander Jackson (sport shooter) (1877–1960), British sport shooter
- Alex Jackson (baseball) (born 1995), baseball player
- Alexander Cosby Jackson (1773–1827), British Army general
- A. J. Jackson, American filmmaker and musician
- Alexander L. Jackson (1891–1973), African American business owner and civic leader
- Alexander Jackson (rugby union)

== See also ==
- Alec Jackson (disambiguation)
