= Alec Jackson =

Alec Jackson may refer to:

- Alec Jackson (footballer, born 1921) (1921–2010), Scottish professional footballer
- Alec Jackson (footballer, born 1937) (1937–2023), English professional footballer

== See also ==
- Alex Jackson (disambiguation)
