= Alec Cameron =

Alec Cameron may refer to:

- Alec Cameron (academic) (born 1963), vice chancellor and chief executive of Aston University
- Alec Cameron (rugby union) (1866–1957), Scotland international rugby union player
- Alec Cameron (soccer), Australian soccer player

== See also ==
- Alex Cameron (disambiguation)
