= Alec McDonald =

Alec McDonald may refer to:

- Alec McDonald (footballer) (1882–1942), Australian rules footballer for Melbourne Football Club
- Alec McDonald (politician) (1878–1956), Australian politician, member of the Victorian Legislative Assembly for Stawell and Ararat

== See also ==
- Alec MacDonald, New Zealand rugby league player
- Alex McDonald (disambiguation)
- Alexander McDonald (disambiguation)
