= Sandy Robertson =

Sandy Robertson may refer to:

- Sandy Robertson (footballer, born 1860), Scottish football player for Preston North End
- Sandy Robertson (footballer, born 1878)
- Sandy Robertson (footballer, born 1971), Scottish football player for Rangers

== See also ==
- Alexander Robertson (disambiguation)
