= Alex Cameron =

Alex Cameron may refer to:

- Alex Cameron (musician), Australian musician
- Alex Cameron (academic) (1937–2003), academic, English professor
- Alex Cameron (artist) (born 1947), visual artist in Toronto, Ontario
- Alex Cameron (bishop) (born 1964), Canadian-born American Anglican bishop
- Alexander Cameron (barrister) (1963–2023), English barrister, brother of former Prime Minister

== See also ==
- Alec Cameron (disambiguation)
