= Alec Taylor =

Alec Taylor may refer to:

- Alec Taylor, Sr. (1825–1895), British Thoroughbred horse trainer
- Alec Taylor, Jr. (1862–1943), British Thoroughbred racehorse trainer
- Alec Taylor (cricketer) (born 1975), Zimbabwean cricketer
- Alec Tayler (1892–1964), Australian rules footballer
