= Attorney General Robertson =

Attorney General Robertson may refer to:

- Jim Robertson (politician) (born 1945), Attorney-General of the Northern Territory
- John Robertson (congressman) (1787–1873), Attorney General of Virginia
- Thomas B. Robertson (1779–1828), Attorney General of the Orleans Territory and Attorney General of Louisiana

== See also ==
- General Robertson (disambiguation)
