= Alec Ingwersen =

Australian rules footballer

Personal information
- Full name: Alec Ingwersen
- Born: 27 July 1941
- Died: 21 September 2016 (aged 75)
- Height: 169 cm (5 ft 7 in)
- Weight: 66 kg (146 lb)

Playing career^{1}
Years	Club	Games (Goals)
1962	Melbourne	2 (0)
- ^{1} Playing statistics correct to the end of 1962.

Alec Ingwersen (27 July 1941 – 21 September 2016) was an Australian rules footballer who played for the Melbourne Football Club in the Victorian Football League (VFL).
