= Alec Kirkland =

Irish footballer

Alec Kirkland (born 26 August 1900, date of death unknown) was an Irish footballer who played as a full-back.

Born in Dublin, he joined Shamrock Rovers in 1923 and stayed for five years at Glenmalure Park. Was part of the unbeaten league sides of 1925 and 1927.

Kirkland was in the first League of Ireland XI team to play an Irish League XI on 13 March 1926, at Dalymount Park. Subsequently, went on to win five league caps in total.

He won one cap for the Irish Free State in the home international at Lansdowne Road on 23 April 1927, against Italy.

== Honours ==
Shamrock Rovers

- League of Ireland: 1924–25, 1926–27
- FAI Cup: 1925
- League of Ireland Shield: 1924–25, 1926–27
- Leinster Senior Cup: 1927

== Sources ==
- The Hoops by Paul Doolan and Robert Goggins (ISBN 0-7171-2121-6)
