= Alec Kerr =

New Zealand cricketer (1876–1953)

Personal information
- Full name: Alexander Charles Kerr
- Born: 1876; New South Wales, Australia
- Died: 30 April 1953 (aged 76–77); Auckland, New Zealand
- Batting: Right-handed
- Bowling: Slow left-arm orthodox
- Relatives: Charlie Kerr (son)

Domestic team information
- Years: Team
- 1906/07–1912/13: Auckland

Career statistics
Competition	First-class
Matches	7
Runs scored	31
Batting average	4.42
100s/50s	0/0
Top score	9
Balls bowled	1,360
Wickets	19
Bowling average	25.94
5 wickets in innings	0
10 wickets in match	0
Best bowling	4/24
Catches/stumpings	10/–
- Source: ESPNcricinfo, 23 November 2025

Alexander Charles Kerr (1876 – 30 April 1953) was a New Zealand cricketer. He came from Australia, where he was a successful cricketer in the Mudgee area.

Kerr was a medium-pace left-arm spin bowler. He played seven first-class matches for Auckland between 1906 and 1913, including the first match played for the Plunket Shield, when he helped Auckland win the shield. His best bowling figures for Auckland were 4 for 24 when Auckland defeated Otago in the 1907–08 season. His son, Charlie, played first-class cricket for Auckland in the 1940s.
