= Alec Vary =

Australian rules footballer (1908–1977)

Personal information
- Full name: Alec Vary
- Born: 3 January 1908
- Died: 28 March 1977 (aged 69)
- Original team: Morwell

Playing career^{1}
Years	Club	Games (Goals)
1927	St Kilda	3 (2)
- ^{1} Playing statistics correct to the end of 1927.

Alec Vary (3 January 1908 – 28 March 1977) was an Australian rules footballer who played for the St Kilda Football Club in the Victorian Football League (VFL).
