= Alec Gallup =

American pollster

Alec Miller Gallup (January 4, 1928 – June 22, 2009) was an American pollster, who served as chairman of the Gallup Poll, after the 1984 death of his father, George Gallup, who created the poll in 1935.

Gallup was born in Iowa City, Iowa on January 4, 1928. After three years at Princeton University, he attended the University of Iowa, graduating in 1950 with a bachelor's degree in journalism in 1950. Gallup did graduate studies Stanford University in communications and at New York University in marketing and advertising research.

He was hired by The Gallup Organization in 1959, the company his father had founded in 1935. The company brought statistical random sampling methods to improve the accuracy of polling, with one of the firm's early triumphs being the successful prediction that Franklin D. Roosevelt would be re-elected in the 1936 presidential election, rebutting surveys that had predicted a win for Republican challenger Alf Landon. The polls done by The Literary Digest were based on 2.4 million responses from its own upscale readers as well as car registrations and phone books, characteristics that would have been more likely at that time to select Republican voters. In contrast, Gallup used statistical methods to ensure that the field interviews his survey collectors gathered included a representative demographic sample.

Following his father's death in July 1984, Alec and his brother George Gallup, Jr. were designated as co-chairmen in 1986, after having worked together with their father to operate the firm. This post continued after the company was bought out by Selection Research, Incorporated (SRI) of Lincoln, Nebraska in September 1988. In this role, Gallup was responsible for creating and wording questions used in the company's surveys. Andrew Kohut, a former Gallup Organization president, credited Alec Gallup with the ability to "smell out a bad question or an unreasonable interpretation of data".

Gallup worked to ensure that the company's name not become a genericized trademark or otherwise misused, including successful legal action in Russia in 2003, where courts prevented companies from using the name without authorization. Despite efforts to maintain the unique use of the name, the term "gallup" has entered the dictionaries in some Scandinavian nations, where the word means "survey".

Gallup died at age 81 on June 22, 2009, in his Princeton, New Jersey home due to heart disease.
