= Alec Brownstein =

American film director

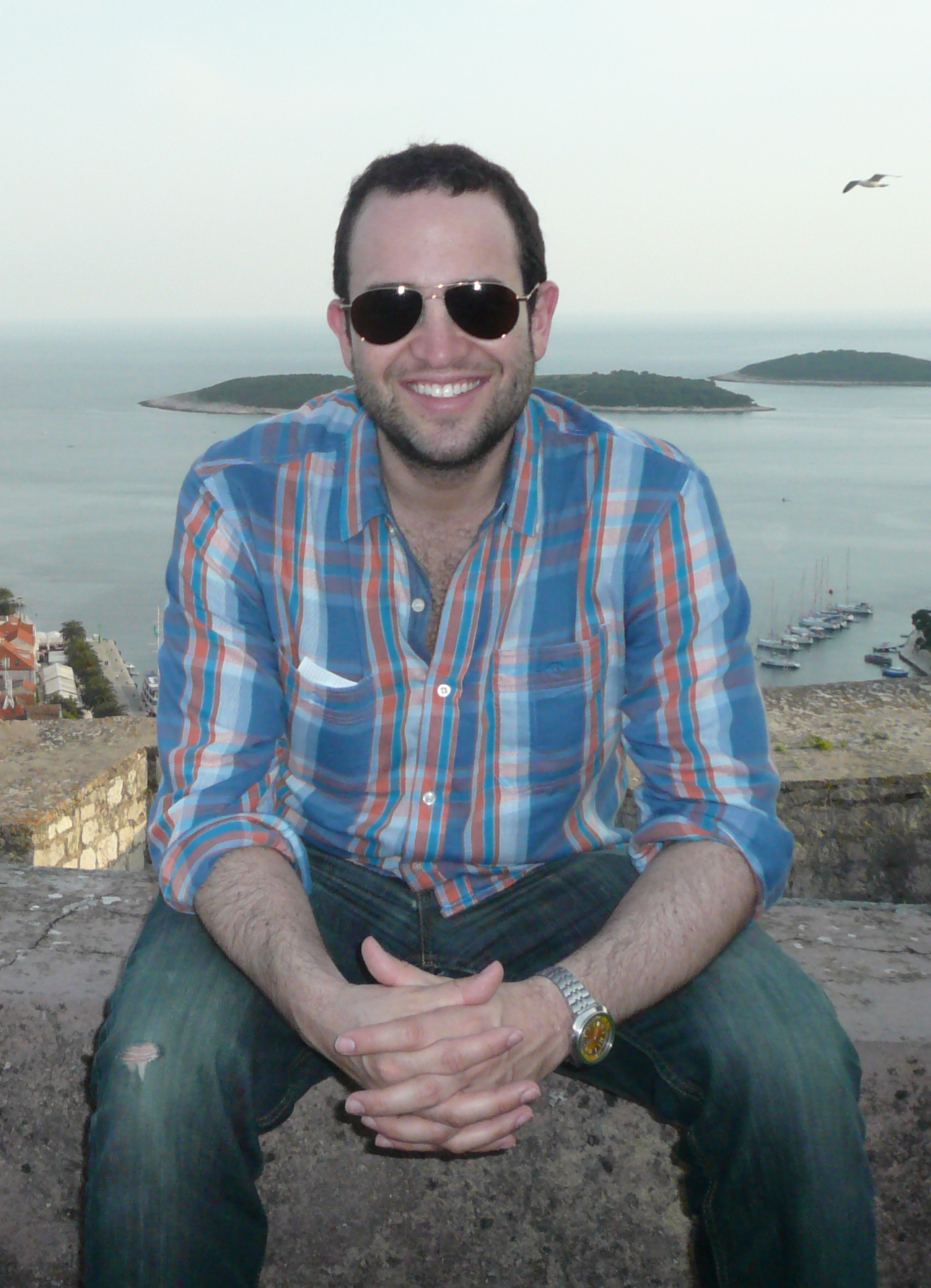
- Brownstein in 2013
- Born: Alec Brownstein; November 21, 1980 (age 45)

Alec Brownstein (born November 21, 1980) is an American creative marketer, the co-author of several humor books, and a film director. He attended The Haverford School in Haverford, Pennsylvania, and Tufts University. He is currently advisor and investor in a number of American startups. Previously, he was Global Head of Creative at PayPal Honey and was also the original Creative Director of Dollar Shave Club.

== Books ==
Brownstein is the author of two bestselling comedy books. His first book with co-author Justin Racz, 50 Relatives Worse Than Yours, was featured on CNN, Fox News, NPR, as well as many local and satellite radio stations. His second book with Racz, 50 Days Worse Than Yours, was featured on Fox News, CNN, local and satellite radio stations, as well as such print outlets as Entertainment Weekly.

== Films ==
Brownstein wrote and directed the short film Trevor's in Heaven which was an official selection of the Austin Film Festival as well as the New Filmmaker's Festival in New York and Los Angeles. It can also be viewed online at YouTube.

== Digital projects ==
In the summer of 2010, he received national and international media attention with The Google Job Experiment a social media experiment whereby creative directors at top advertising agencies saw ads directed only to them appearing only when they Googled their own names.
