= Alec Birrell =

Australian rules footballer, born 1885

Personal information
- Full name: William Alexander Hamilton Birrell
- Born: 24 January 1885; Laen, Victoria
- Died: 11 May 1948 (aged 63); Heidelberg, Victoria
- Original team: Geelong College

Playing career^{1}
Years	Club	Games (Goals)
1911	University	1 (0)
- ^{1} Playing statistics correct to the end of 1911.

William Alexander Hamilton Birrell (24 January 1885 – 11 May 1948) was a doctor and an Australian rules footballer who played for University in the Victorian Football League (VFL).

The oldest son of Albert Veit Birrell and Christina Matheson, Alec Birrell was born in Laen (near Donald, Victoria) and was educated at Geelong College where he was a prominent member of the school football team.

He proceeded to study medicine at the University of Melbourne and during his student years Birrell was promoted from the seconds to play one VFL match for University against South Melbourne in the first round of the 1911 VFL season.

After graduating as a doctor in 1914, he served with the 20th Light Horse and British Royal Army Medical Corps in World War I. Upon his return to Australia, Birrell practiced in Nathalia for several years. Birrell was also Vice President of the Nathalia Football Club in 1923.

Birrell later brought into a medical practice in Cheltenham, Victoria in 1927.

In 1920, he married Mary Adela Lane and they had three children together. He died in the Repatriation Hospital in Heidelberg on 11 May 1948.
