= Alec Reid (rugby union) =

South African rugby union player (b. 1878, d. 1952)

- Born: Alexander Reid; 23 November 1878 Swellendam, Cape Colony
- Died: 18 May 1952 (aged 73)
- School: Sea Point

Rugby union career
- Position: Forward
Provincial / State sides
Years	Team	Apps	(Points)
- Western Province
International career
Years	Team	Apps	(Points)
1903	South Africa	1	(3)
- Correct as of 3 June 2019

Alec Reid (23 November 1878 – 18 May 1952) was a South African international rugby union player who played as a forward.

He made 1 appearance for South Africa in 1903 scoring a try.
