= Alek Rapoport =

Russian painter

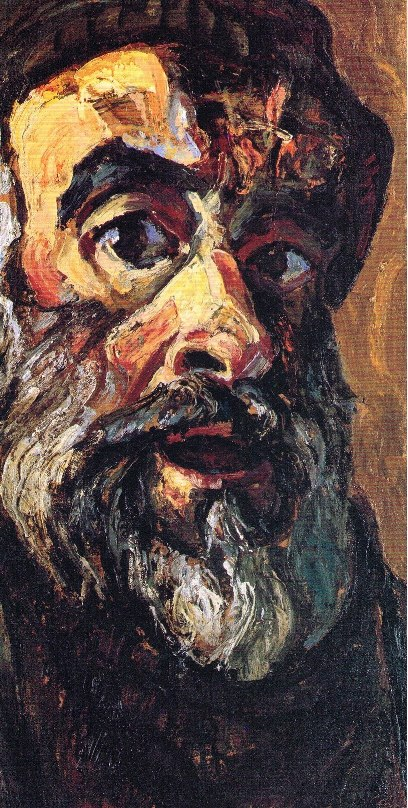
- Self-Portrait, 1990
- Born: November 24, 1933; Kharkiv, Ukraine SSR
- Died: February 4, 1997 (aged 63); San Francisco
- Education: V.Serov School of Art, Leningrad State Institute for Theater, Music and Cinema
- Known for: Painting
- Movement: Russian Nonconformism

Alek Rapoport (November 24, 1933, Kharkiv, Ukraine SSR – February 4, 1997, San Francisco) was a Ukrainian Nonconformist artist, art theorist, and teacher.

== Early life and education ==
Alek Rapoport spent his childhood in Kyiv (Ukraine SSR). During Stalin's "purges" both his parents were arrested. His father was shot and his mother spent ten years in a Siberian labor camp. Rapoport lived with his aunt. At the beginning of World War II, he was evacuated to the city of Ufa (the Bashkir Autonomous Soviet Socialist Republic). A time of extreme loneliness, cold, hunger, and deprivation, this period also marked the beginning of Rapoport's drawing studies.

After the war, Rapoport lived in Chernovtsy (Western Ukraine), a city with a certain European flair. At the local House of Folk Arts, he found his first art teacher, E.Sagaidachny (1886–1961), a former member of the nonconformist artist groups Union of the Youth (Soyuz Molodyozhi) and Donkey's Tail, popular during the 1910s–1920s. His other art teacher was I. Beklemisheva (1903–1988). Impressed by Rapoport's talent, she later (1950) organized his move to Leningrad, where he entered the famous V.Serov School of Art (the former School of the Imperial Society for the Promotion of Arts, OPKh, later the Tavricheskaya Art School).

His association with this school lasted eight years, first as a student, and then, from 1965 to 1968, as a teacher. With "Socialist realism" the only official style during this time, most of the art school's faculty had to conceal any prior involvement in non-conformist art movements. Ya.K.Shablovsky, V.M.Sudakov, A.A.Gromov introduced their students to Constructivism only through clandestine means.

The school emphasized fundamental drawing skills and an appreciation for Italian Renaissance art. Additionally, Rapoport continued to educate himself, spending hours at the Hermitage Museum, copying paintings of the Old Masters, and studying art at public libraries. Rapoport's generation expressed an increasing interest in contemporary art. Expositions of French Impressionists came to Leningrad, followed by other exhibitions of modern art from various European countries. This new freedom proved a powerful source of ideas.

His last year in school was interrupted by the military draft. He was stationed in Birobidzhan (the Jewish Autonomous Oblast), where he continued to draw and paint during his free time, making a series of sketches vividly depicting scenes of a soldier's everyday life and creating the oil painting The Taking of a Hill for a Khabarovsk museum. After his military service, Rapoport returned to the Serov School of Art. His diploma work Laying the Wreaths on the Field of Mars (1958), was denounced as "formalist," a stigma which followed him from then on.

Over the next four years (1959–1963) Rapoport studied stage design at the Leningrad Institute of Theater, Music and Cinema under the supervision of the famous artist and stage director N.P.Akimov. Akimov taught a unique course based on theories of Russian Suprematism and Constructivism, while encouraging his graduate students to apply their knowledge to every field of art design. Despite differences in personal artistic taste with Akimov, who was drawn to Vermeer and Dalí, Rapoport was influenced by Akimov's personality and liberalism, as well as the logical style of his art.

In 1963, Rapoport graduated from the institute. His highly acclaimed MFA work involved the stage and costume design for I.Babel's play Sunset. In preparation, he traveled to the southwest regions of the Soviet Union, where he accumulated many objects of Judaic iconography from former ghettos, disappearing synagogues and old cemeteries. He wandered Odessa in search of Babel's characters and the atmosphere of his books.

Rapoport considered himself a practitioner of Russian Constructivism with roots in ancient Mediterranean and Byzantine art forms. He was strongly influenced by Tartu's school of structural semiotics and by its founder, Juri Lotman. Concurrently, Rapoport pursued a deep study of Byzantine art and icons. His final studies while in Russia concentrated on the works of the Russian Orthodox priest Father Pavel Florensky and the art historian Lev Zhegin.

== Career ==
After graduation, Rapoport's life was full of a variety of activities, but his most important goal was to try to combine official art with his own creative ideas. The greatest opportunities for this came through work for the theater in the town of Volkhov, as well as at Houses of Culture. He made sketches for sets and costumes for various plays such as Brecht's The Good Woman from Szechuan and Fear and Misery of the Third Reich, Pushkin's The Queen of Spades, Brandon Thomas's Charley's Aunt and V.Ivanov's Armored Train 14-69.

At this time, Rapoport also worked as an artist's assistant at "Lenfilm" and as a book designer and illustrator for various publishing houses. However, his greatest satisfaction came from teaching specialty courses in composition, design and human anatomy at the Serov Art School. He organized a new liberal course in technical aesthetics, introducing his students to Lotman's theory of semiotics, the Modulor of Le Corbusier, the Bauhaus school, Russian Constructivism, Russian icons and contemporary Western art. As a result of his "radicalism," Rapoport was fired for "ideological conspiracy."

Thereafter, Rapoport channeled all his energy into his own creative work. His main projects centered on Biblical themes, Anti-Semitism and subjects of everyday life. He sought to cultivate himself as Jewish artist. This became particularly noticeable after the Six-Day War, when the Israeli victory led intellectuals, including the Jewish intelligentsia, to feel a heightened interest in Jewish culture and its Biblical roots. Rapoport's works of this period include Three Figures, a series of images of Talmudic Scholars, and works dealing with anti-Semitism.

=== 1970s ===
In the 1970s Rapoport joined the non-conformist movement, which opposed the dogmas of "Socialist realism" in art, along with Soviet censorship. The movement sought to preserve the traditions of Russian iconography and the Constructivist/Suprematist style of the 1910s. Despite the authorities' persecutions of nonconformist artists (including arrests, forced evictions, terminations of employment, and various forms of routine hassling), they united in a group, "TEV – Fellowship of Experimental Exhibitions." TEV's exhibitions proved tremendously successful.

In the same period, Rapoport became one of the initiators of another anti-establishment group, ALEF (Union of Leningrad's Jewish Artists). In the United States this group was known as "Twelve from the Soviet Underground." Rapoport's involvement with this group increased tension with the authorities and attracted KGB scrutiny, including "friendly conversations," surveillance, detentions and house arrests. It became increasingly dangerous for him to live and work in the USSR. In October 1976, Rapoport with his wife and son were forced to leave Russia.

Following the usual path among Russian immigrants of that time, the family traveled through Austria and Italy, then moved to the U.S. They lived in Italy half a year. Despite missing Russia, Rapoport savored his exposure to Italian culture and art, which had intrigued him since childhood. The entire environment strongly inspired his mind and creative work.

In Italy, Rapoport exhibited at the Venice Biennale, "La Nuova Arte Sovietica-Una prospettiva non-ufficiale" (1977), participated in television programs about nonconformist art in the Soviet Union, and created lithographic works continuing his theme of Jewish characters from Babel's play Sunset.

In 1977, Rapoport's family was granted U.S. immigration status and settled in San Francisco. With assistance from the Bay Area Council of Soviet Jews (BACSJ), Rapoport traveled to many American cities as a representative of the "ALEF" group, known in U.S. as "12 from the Soviet Underground," accompanying exhibitions of these artists and lecturing.

Rapoport grew up in the anti-religious Soviet environment. An encounter with the New Testament at age 16 led his first creation of religious artwork. Beginning in the 1960s, images of the Biblical prophets emerged as a recurring theme in Rapoport's art. His inspiration came from various sources: the stories of the Old and New Testaments, the art of Russian (Byzantine) icons as well as the humanistic art of Renaissance, and Russian religious philosophers such as S.Bulgakov, N.Berdyayev, V.Solovyov. Among this latter group, Rapoport had a special regard for Father Pavel Florensky. Rapoport dedicated his painting Short Life of Euphrosynos the Cook (1978) to the memory of Florensky, who perished in a Gulag in 1944.

For almost nine years, Rapoport was employed as a draftsman-designer of stage equipment, while continuing his own creative work. Initially overwhelmed by a sense of freedom in his new life, he soon came to feel that these liberties restricted more than they permitted, with freedom limited to the narrow views of artists who followed the demands of the market. He experienced difficulty fitting into the American contemporary art mainstream, which he considered frivolous, career-oriented and devoid of any spirituality or artistic merit.

=== 1980s ===
For Rapoport, the 1980s were a time full of creativity and significant life events. He participated in numerous exhibitions in San Francisco and other American cities, sold his paintings in auctions in Europe and the U.S., illustrated Erotic Tales of Old Russia by A.Afanasyev (Scythian Books, Oakland, CA), and traveled to European countries. A visit to Spain made a profound impression on him, confirming a sense of personal connection, even blood ties, with the art and culture of the country of El Greco. Rapoport began a new series of paintings inspired by his experiences in Spain.

In 1984, a significant event in Rapoport's life occurred in his meeting with San Francisco gallery owner Michael Dunev, who became his friend and representative, organizing all his exhibitions until the artist's death.

Rapoport tried to make a connection to bridge the gap between his art and the American viewers, a goal perhaps reflected in his new series of paintings, Images of San Francisco. While in Russia, Rapoport had concentrated on interior and spiritual subjects; in San Francisco, he broadened his art with new sources. He valued the city's international flavor, theatrical and dramatical image, phantasmal ocean-accented light and geographical structure, capturing these qualities with his characteristic forced spherical perspectives and expressionistic coloration, evoking a sense of a spontaneous theater of everyday life. Images of San Francisco came to constitute a second major body of subjects in Rapoport's art.

At the same time, the idea of "brotherhood" and artists "guild" had always attracted Rapoport, and he particularly missed this sense of fellowship while in the U.S. Accordingly, in 1992, he organized the group "SPSF"(Saint Petersburg-San Francisco). SPSF consisted of two artists and two photographers, all St. Petersburg natives who had wound up in San Francisco. The four saw themselves as heirs of the great St. Petersburg cultural tradition, while also having absorbed the new San Francisco environment. Their exhibitions were enthusiastically received by Russians and Americans.

In 1987, Rapoport was finally able devote himself completely to his creative work. While his subject matter did not change, his works increased in emotional impact and his technical skills became fully developed.

=== 1990s ===
Toward the end of the 1980s and beginning of the 1990s, Rapoport completed his most ambitious works on the theme of the Old Testament prophets: Samson Destroying the House of the Philistines (1989), Lamentation and Mourning and Woe (1990), the four paintings Angel and Prophets (1990–1991) and Three Deeds of Moses (1992).

In 1992, the artist's friends in St. Petersburg organized the first exhibition of his works there since his departure into exile, with works patiently gathered from collectors and art museums. This exhibition, held in the City Museum of St. Petersburg and accompanied by headlines such as "A St. Petersburg artist returns to his town," was followed by much larger ones in 1993 (St. Petersburg and Moscow), organized in collaboration with Michael Dunev Gallery under the name California Branches – Russian Roots. The exhibitions, with an invitation featuring Rapoport's painting Self-portrait as a Mask of Mordecai (1985), marked the artist's first visit to Russia since his departure in 1976.

Rapoport had always protested loudly and openly. In Russia, he protested against the rigidity of the system of teaching, against the communist ideology and censorship in art, against the suppression of religious art. He took a leading part in the creation of the dissident art groups TEV and ALEF. For this he was persecuted by the authorities and forced to emigrate.

Then, in the U.S., Rapoport protested against commercialism in art, against the dominance of ideas of market over ideas of spirit, against the crushing of religious art by public indifference, against the loss of Judeo-Christian values. "In search of these values, I turn again and again to the Old Masters from the Mediterranean region, where at the very outset of Western Civilization, the art of Pictorial Image was born, art in which both the Divine Spirit and the Human Being served as the measure for all things." This was the subject of Rapoport's "loud and bitter cry."

The last five years of Rapoport's life (1993–1997) were spent in voluntary seclusion. He did not endure emigration easily. "What a pathetic life, everything repeats itself," he said, quoting from the letters of Albrecht Dürer, another artist who saw himself as born in the wrong place and time.

During these years, Rapoport concentrated on his own creative world. In his own words, he worked not for the sake of art, but because art gave him the means to express himself. He sought to reach the very core and heart of the image, an urge complemented by his ever-present inner desire to attain the ideal.

In 1995, he began an association with CIVA (Christians in Visual Arts), participating in the group's exhibitions and conferences. He produced more expressionistic paintings on religious themes, while continuing his ongoing series Images of San Francisco. His works became increasingly spiritual and magically expressive. The art critic V.Baranovsky (Moscow-San Francisco) noted, "One can not leave unnoticed the strange power of these paintings, which remind us of the incandescent coals of Old Russian icons."

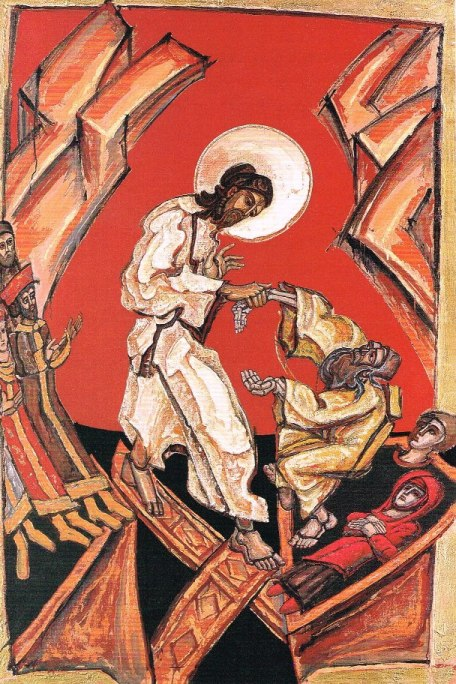
Anastasis-1, 1996

By 1996, the artist almost never left his studio, completing Anastasis 1, based on the apocryphal fourth-century Gospel of Nicodemus. The painting was his final and most personal religious work.

== Death ==
On February 4, 1997, Alek Rapoport died suddenly and unexpectedly in his studio while working on his new painting Trinity.

== Main personal exhibits ==
- 1980 – Gallerie "Trifalco," Rome, Italy
- 1981 – Images of San Francisco, Eduard Nakhamkin Gallery, New York, NY.
- 1984 – Images of San Francisco, University of the Pacific Gallery, Stockton, CA.
- 1986 – Images of San Francisco, Michael Dunev Gallery, San Francisco, CA.
- 1988 – Ecumenical Works, Michael Dunev Gallery, San Francisco, CA.
- 1992 – Russia-USA, The Museum of the City of St. Petersburg, St. Petersburg, Russia.
- 1993 – California Branches-Russian Roots, Manege Exhibition Hall, St. Petersburg, Russia; National Exhibition Hall, Moscow, Russia.
- 1996 – Ecumenical Paintings, SOMAR Gallery, San Francisco, CA.
- 1997 – The Last Paintings: A Memorial Exhibition, Michael Dunev Gallery, San Francisco, CA; The Early Drawings. A Memorial Exhibition. George Krevsky Fine Art, San Francisco, CA; Sacred Inspiration: Icons by Alek Rapoport, The Marian Library, IMRI, Dayton University, Dayton, OH.
- 1998 – Angel and Prophet, Center for Art and Religion, Washington, DC.
- 2004 – Images of San Francisco, Diaghilev Art Center, St. Petersburg, Russia.
- 2007 – Alek Rapoport: A Memorial Exhibition, Belcher Studios Gallery, San Francisco, CA.

== Main collections ==
- Russian Museum, St. Petersburg, Russia
- Tretyakov Gallery, Moscow, Russia
- Hermitage Museum, St. Petersburg, Russia
- Ellis Island Museum, NJ
- Personal collection of John Paul II, Vatican City, Italy
- International Marian Research Institute, Dayton University, Dayton, OH.
- Judah L. Magnes Museum, Berkeley, CA.
- Zimmerli Art Museum, Rutgers University, New Brunswick, NJ
- Legion of Honor Museum, San Francisco, CA.
- Duke University Museum of Art, Duke University, Durham, NC.
- Oakland Museum of California, Oakland, CA.
- Museum of Nonconformist Art, St. Petersburg, Russia
- Moscow Museum of Modern Art, Moscow, Russia
- Diaghilev Art Center, St. Petersburg, Russia

== Bibliography ==
- From Gulag to Glasnost: Nonconformist Art from the Soviet Union. The N&N Dodge Collection. Thames and Hudson, New York, 1995
- Rapoport, Alek. Tradition and Innovation in the Fine Arts. Canadian-American Slavic Studies. Publisher BRILL, Volume 45, Number 2, 2011, P. 183-206 ISSN 0090-8290
- 12 from the Soviet Underground. Catalogue, Berkeley, CA, 1976
- Creativity Under Duress: From Gulag To Glasnost. Catalogue, Louisville, KY, 1989
- Soltes, Ori Z. III. Art, Politics, Literature and Religion, Art and the Holocaust. B'nai B'rith Klutznick National Museum, Washington DC. P. 6-8
- Scharlach, B. California Dreamin'. Hadassah, Volume 68, Number 4, December 1986. P. 50
- Bernstein, Boris. Rapoportian Space. Canadian American Slavic Studies. Publisher Charles Schlacks, vol.41, No 2, Summer, 2007, California, USA, P. 205–216.
- Alek Rapoport. An Artist's Journey. Album, Michael Dunev Gallery, San Francisco, 1998. ISBN 0-9661190-0-2
- Dunev, Michael. Art of Conscience: The Paintings of Alek Rapoport. ARTS, Eleven one, 1999, New Brighton, MN, USA, C.36–37
- Jane, R. Russian Artists at OPTS Art. Asian Art News, vol.5, No1, January–February 1995, San Francisco, CA
- Alek Rapoport. St.Petersburg — San Francisco. Catalogue, APOLLON, St. Petersburg, 1993
