= Alec Luyckx =

Belgian footballer

Personal information
- Date of birth: 19 May 1995 (age 31)
- Place of birth: Belgium
- Height: 1.75 m (5 ft 9 in)
- Position: Midfielder

Team information
- Current team: KVC Wilrijk
- Number: 95

Youth career
- Anderlecht

Senior career*
Years	Team	Apps	(Gls)
2013–2016	Waasland-Beveren	8	(0)
2016	→ Cappellen (loan)	13	(4)
2016–2017	Londerzeel		
2017–2018	KRC Gent		
2018–2019	KSV Bornem		
2019–2021	Lokeren-Temse	24	(4)
2021–2022	Sint-Niklaas		
2022–2023	Berchem Sport	22	(0)
2023–2025	RVC Hoboken		
2025–	KVC Wilrijk	0	(0)
- * Club domestic league appearances and goals as of 23:51, 2 February 2026 (UTC)

Alec Luyckx (born 19 May 1995) is a Belgian professional footballer who plays as a midfielder for KVC Wilrijk.

== Club career ==
Luyckx joined Waasland-Beveren in 2013 from R.S.C. Anderlecht. He made his Belgian Pro League debut at 29 March 2014 against Lierse in a 2–0 home win. He replaced Robin Henkens after 76 minutes.

On 6 January 2016, Luyckx signed a loan deal with R. Cappellen.
