= Alec Kaplan =

South African philatelist

Alec Kaplan (1890–1963) was a South African philatelist who was added to the Roll of Distinguished Philatelists in 1958.
