= Alec Price (cricketer) =

Australian cricketer

Personal information
- Born: 31 March 1913; Brisbane, Queensland, Australia
- Died: 3 May 1999 (aged 86); Wavell Heights, Queensland, Australia
- Source: Cricinfo, 6 October 2020

Alec Price (31 March 1913 – 3 May 1999) was an Australian cricketer. He played in two first-class matches for Queensland in 1945/46.

== See also ==
- List of Queensland first-class cricketers
