= Alec Atkinson =

Royal Air Force officer

Sir Alec Atkinson KCB, DFC
- Birth name: John Alexander Atkinson
- Born: 9 June 1919
- Died: 8 August 2015 (aged 96)
- Allegiance: United Kingdom
- Branch: Royal Air Force

Sir John Alexander Atkinson KCB, DFC (9 June 1919 – 8 August 2015) was a Royal Air Force officer of the Second World War who later had a distinguished career in the British civil service.
