= Alec Jackson (footballer, born 1921) =

Scottish footballer (1921–2010)

Personal information
- Full name: Alexander Wilson Jackson
- Date of birth: 2 October 1921
- Place of birth: Lesmahagow, Lanarkshire, Scotland
- Date of death: 22 May 2010 (aged 88)
- Place of death: City of Campbelltown, South Australia, Australia
- Height: 5 ft 9 1/2 in (1.77 m)
- Positions: Half-back; inside forward; winger

Senior career*
Years	Team	Apps	(Gls)
1939–	Crewe Alexandra	0	(0)
–1946	Huddersfield Town	0	(0)
1946–1950	York City	50	(5)
1950–	Goole Town		
Total		50	(5)
- * Club domestic league appearances and goals

Alexander Wilson Jackson (2 October 1921 – 22 May 2010), generally known as Alex Jackson or Alec Jackson, was a Scottish professional footballer who played as a half-back, an inside forward or a winger in the Football League for York City, in non-League football for Goole Town and was on the books of Crewe Alexandra and Huddersfield Town without making a league appearance. He died in the City of Campbelltown, South Australia in May 2010 at the age of 88.
