= Alec Farrow =

Australian rules footballer

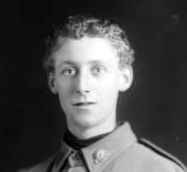

Personal information
- Full name: Alexander Farrow
- Born: 8 February 1894; Carlton, Victoria
- Died: 15 September 1955 (aged 61); Hughesdale, Victoria
- Original teams: Army & Carlton District
- Height: 173 cm (5 ft 8 in)
- Weight: 68 kg (150 lb)

Playing career^{1}
Years	Club	Games (Goals)
1919–21	Melbourne	33 (10)
1922–23	Carlton	14 (14)
Total		47 (24)
- ^{1} Playing statistics correct to the end of 1923.

Alexander Farrow (8 February 1894 – 15 September 1955) was an Australian rules footballer who played for the Carlton Football Club and Melbourne Football Club in the Victorian Football League (VFL).

Farrow was born in Carlton, the second son of Robert William Johnston and Mary Ann Perry. He was attracted to the military during his schooldays, and so enlisted to fight in World War 1 as soon as he turned 18. Trained as a signaller, he spent the last two years of the conflict in the Middle East – where, like many of the Australian troops, he took every opportunity he could to kick a football. He returned to Australia in April 1919.

Farrow commenced his VFL career at Melbourne late in the 1919 season. He proved himself a sure ball-handler at ground level and had an uncanny ability to read the ball as it spilt from packs. His disposal was accurate, and he took a good mark for his size. Something of a sensation from his first appearance, he played in the middle in most of his 33 games and represented Victoria in both 1920 and 1921.

In 1922, Carlton convinced Farrow to move to Princes Park. His twelve games for the season produced 12 goals and included his only finals appearance, with Essendon scoring in the last few minutes to beat Carlton by 5 points.

Farrow's career lasted just two more games after that high point, ending with a sickening collision with a Richmond opponent at Punt Road Oval in May 1923. Farrow and his adversary clashed heads in a ground level contest, and both were taken from the field unconscious. At first it was feared that Farrow had sustained a fractured skull, but it was later confirmed as severe concussion.

Almost twenty years later, when World War II broke out, Farrow volunteered a second time to serve his country – in the blue serge uniform of the RAAF. He was restricted by his age to duty within Australia, but rose to the rank of Corporal before his final discharge in January 1948. He died seven years later at the age of 61.
