= Alec Kay =

Scottish footballer

Personal information
- Full name: Alexander Kay
- Date of birth: 1879
- Place of birth: Edinburgh, Scotland
- Date of death: 15 February 1917 (aged 38)
- Place of death: France
- Position: Left back

Senior career*
Years	Team	Apps	(Gls)
–1898	Dalry Primrose		
1898–1900	St Bernard's	27	(0)
1900–1901	Partick Thistle	19	(0)
1901–1902	Sheffield United	6	(0)
1905	Norwich City	1	(1)
- * Club domestic league appearances and goals

Alexander Kay (1879 – 15 February 1917) was a Scottish professional football left back who played in the Scottish League for St Bernard's and Partick Thistle. He also played in the Football League for Sheffield United.

== Personal life ==
A pre-war Royal Scot, Kay served as a rifleman in the Rifle Brigade (The Prince Consort's Own) during the First World War and was killed on the Western Front on 15 February 1917. He is commemorated on the Thiepval Memorial.

== Career statistics ==
Appearances and goals by club, season and competition
Club	Season	League			National cup (Note: Includes Scottish Cup, FA Cup)		Other		Total	
Club	Season	Division	Apps	Goals	Apps	Goals	Apps	Goals	Apps	Goals
St Bernard's	1898–99	Scottish League First Division	13	0	2	0	—		15	0
St Bernard's	1899–1900	Scottish League First Division	14	0	2	0	—		16	0
St Bernard's	Total		27	0	4	0	—		31	0
Partick Thistle	1900–01	Scottish League First Division	19	0	1	0	4 (Note: Appearances in Glasgow Cup)	0	24	0
Norwich City	1904–05	Norfolk & Suffolk League	1	1	—		—		1	1
Career total			47	1	5	0	4	0	56	1
