= Alec Grant =

New Zealand cricketer

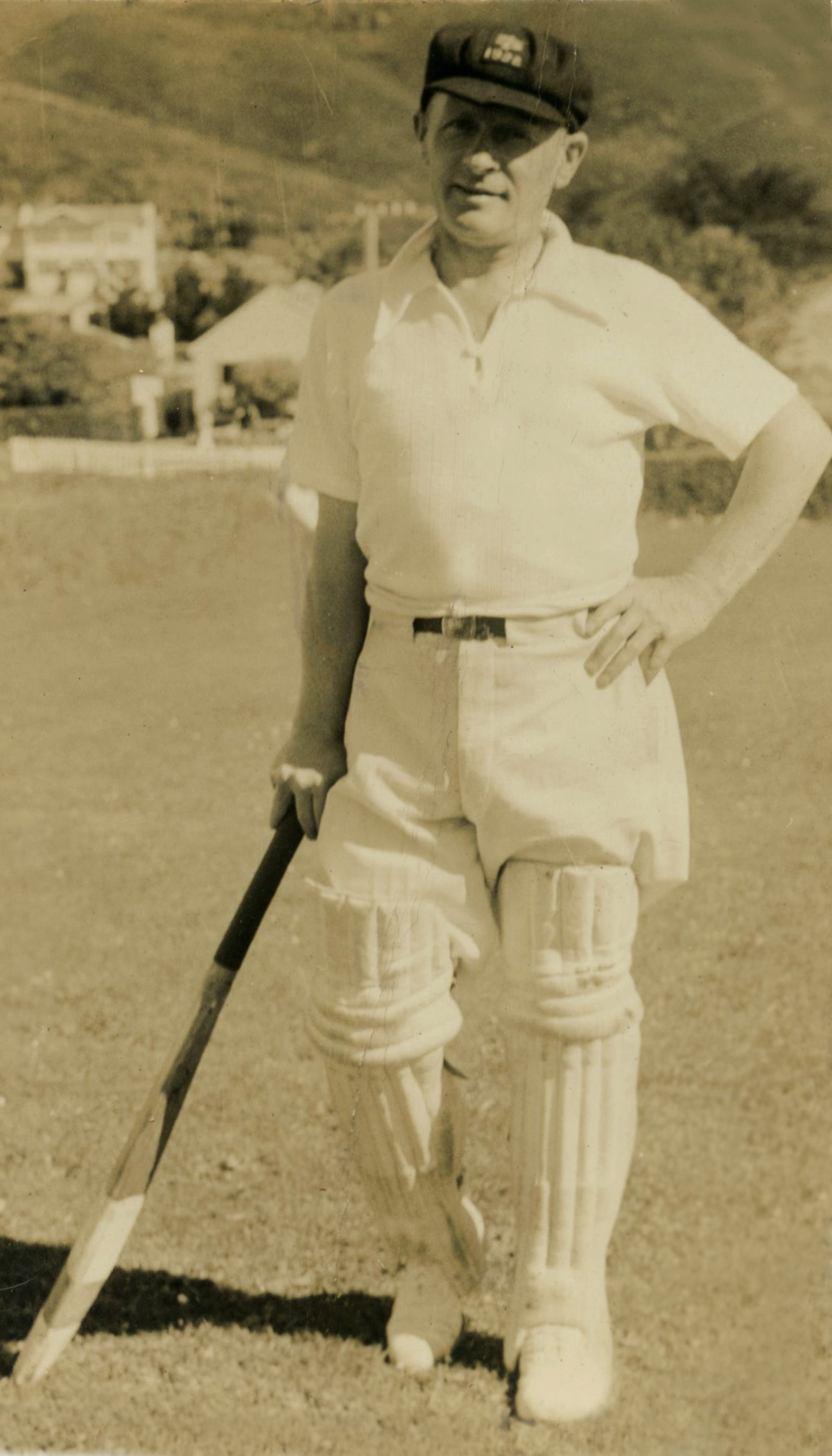

Personal information
- Full name: Thomas Alexander Brandon Grant
- Born: 5 December 1893; Newcastle, New South Wales, Australia
- Died: 9 June 1966 (aged 72); Lower Hutt, New Zealand
- Batting: Left-handed
- Bowling: Slow left-arm orthodox

Domestic team information
- Years: Team
- 1920/21–1921/22: Canterbury
- 1922/23–1924/25: Wellington

Career statistics
Competition	First-class
Matches	9
Runs scored	305
Batting average	19.06
100s/50s	0/3
Top score	78
Balls bowled	580
Wickets	8
Bowling average	35.62
5 wickets in innings	0
10 wickets in match	0
Best bowling	2/19
Catches/stumpings	4/–
- Source: CricketArchive

Thomas Alexander Brandon Grant (5 December 1893 – 9 June 1966) was a New Zealand cricketer who played first-class cricket from 1920 to 1925.

After working as a clerk in Christchurch, Alec Grant enlisted in the First World War and served as a corporal in the New Zealand Medical Corps on the hospital ship Marama. He was later promoted to sergeant, and towards the end of the war served on the Matatua. An album of photographs he took during his service in Europe and the Middle East is in the National Library of New Zealand.

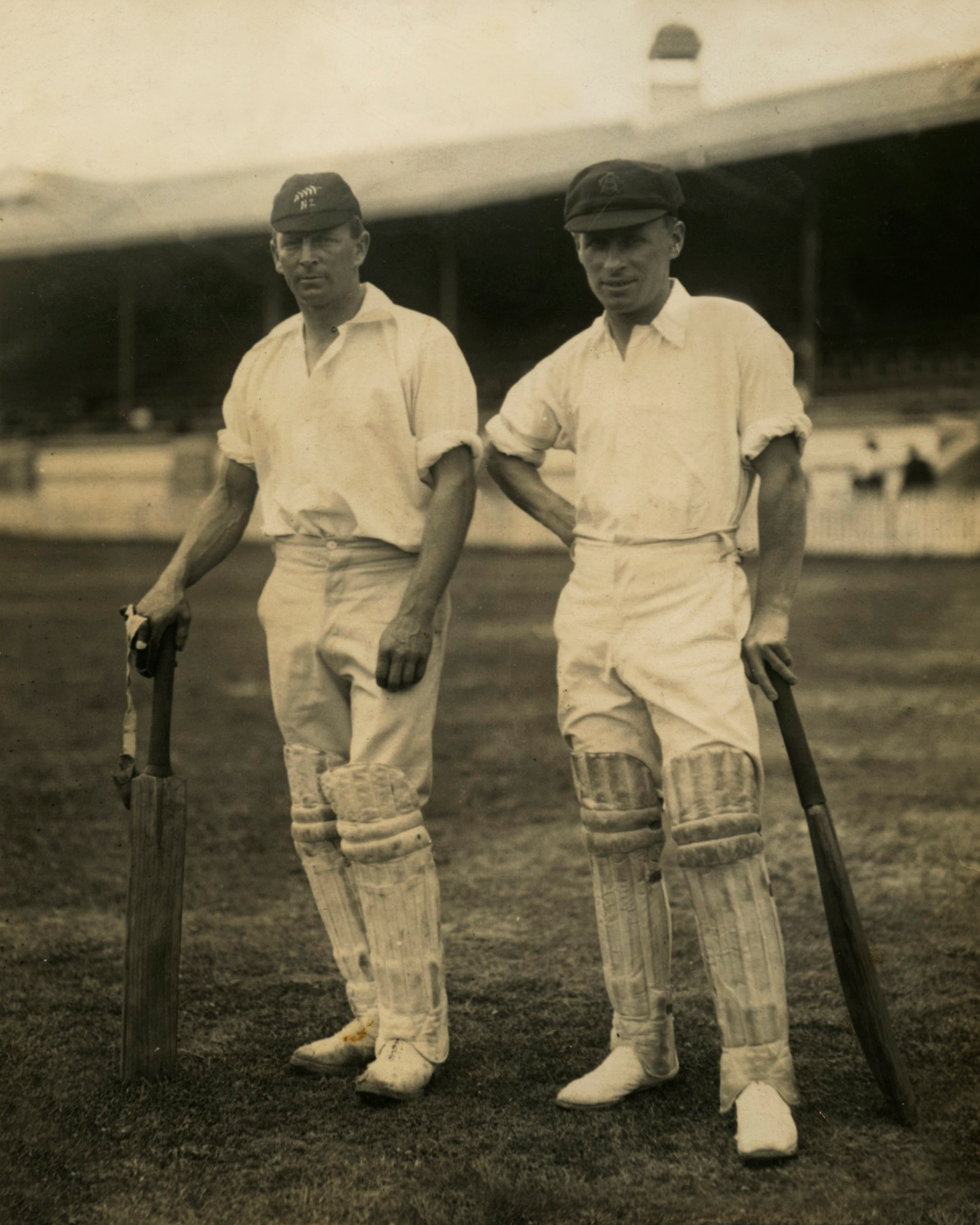
Alec Grant (on right)

Grant was a middle-order batsman and left-arm spin bowler. He played his first match for Canterbury in 1920–21, and then was one of the leading batsmen in the 1921–22 Plunket Shield, with 226 runs at an average of 56.50. In Canterbury's victory over Otago he made his top score of 78, which was also Canterbury's top score in the match. In the loss to Auckland he top-scored in each innings with 66 not out and 64 not out. He played for South Island against North Island at the end of the season, but was not successful.

Grant moved to the Manawatū District in 1922, where he captained the Manawatu cricket team and also represented Wellington. After the MCC toured New Zealand in 1922–23, their captain, Archie MacLaren, singled Grant out as a player of particular promise, and suggested him as a member of the New Zealand side that might tour England in 1925. However, Grant played little cricket after that season. In 1928 he married Erna Gerritzen; they had one son, Lindsay.
