= Alec Rodger =

British psychologist (1907–1982)

Alex Rodger
- Born: Alec Roger; 1907
- Died: 1982 (aged 74–75)
- Education: University of Cambridge
- Scientific career
- Fields: Psychology, Occupational psychology

Alex Rodger (1907–1982) was a British occupational psychologist.

== Career ==
After reading psychology at the University of Cambridge, Rodger began work in the National institute of Industrial Psychology in London. During the war he worked in government departments and rose to the post of Senior Principal Psychologist in the Admiralty. After the war he moved to academia and held the post of Reader in Psychology (1948-1960) and then Professor of Occupational Psychology (1960-1975) at Birkbeck College, London. In 1983 an annual Alec Rodger Memorial Lecture was established at Birkbeck College.

He published on various aspects of occupational psychology. His most influential publication was his seven point plan for occupational assessment.

He was very active in the British Psychological Society in which he held the post of Honorary Secretary and then President. He also edited Occupational Psychology from 1946 to 1968.

== Works ==
Rodger, A. (1968) The Seven Point Plan.

== Honours ==
- President, British Psychological Society, 1957–58
