= Alec McDonald (footballer) =

Australian rules footballer

Personal information
- Full name: Alexander James McDonald
- Born: 30 August 1882; Eaglehawk, Victoria
- Died: 21 August 1942 (aged 59); Thornbury, Victoria
- Original team: Bendigo
- Height: 185 cm (6 ft 1 in)

Playing career^{1}
Years	Club	Games (Goals)
1906	Melbourne	1 (0)
- ^{1} Playing statistics correct to the end of 1906.

Alexander James McDonald (30 August 1882 – 21 August 1942) was an Australian rules footballer who played for the Melbourne Football Club in the Victorian Football League (VFL).

After his one game with Melbourne, McDonald transferred to West Melbourne in the Victorian Football Association (VFA).
