= Alec Russell =

English journalist

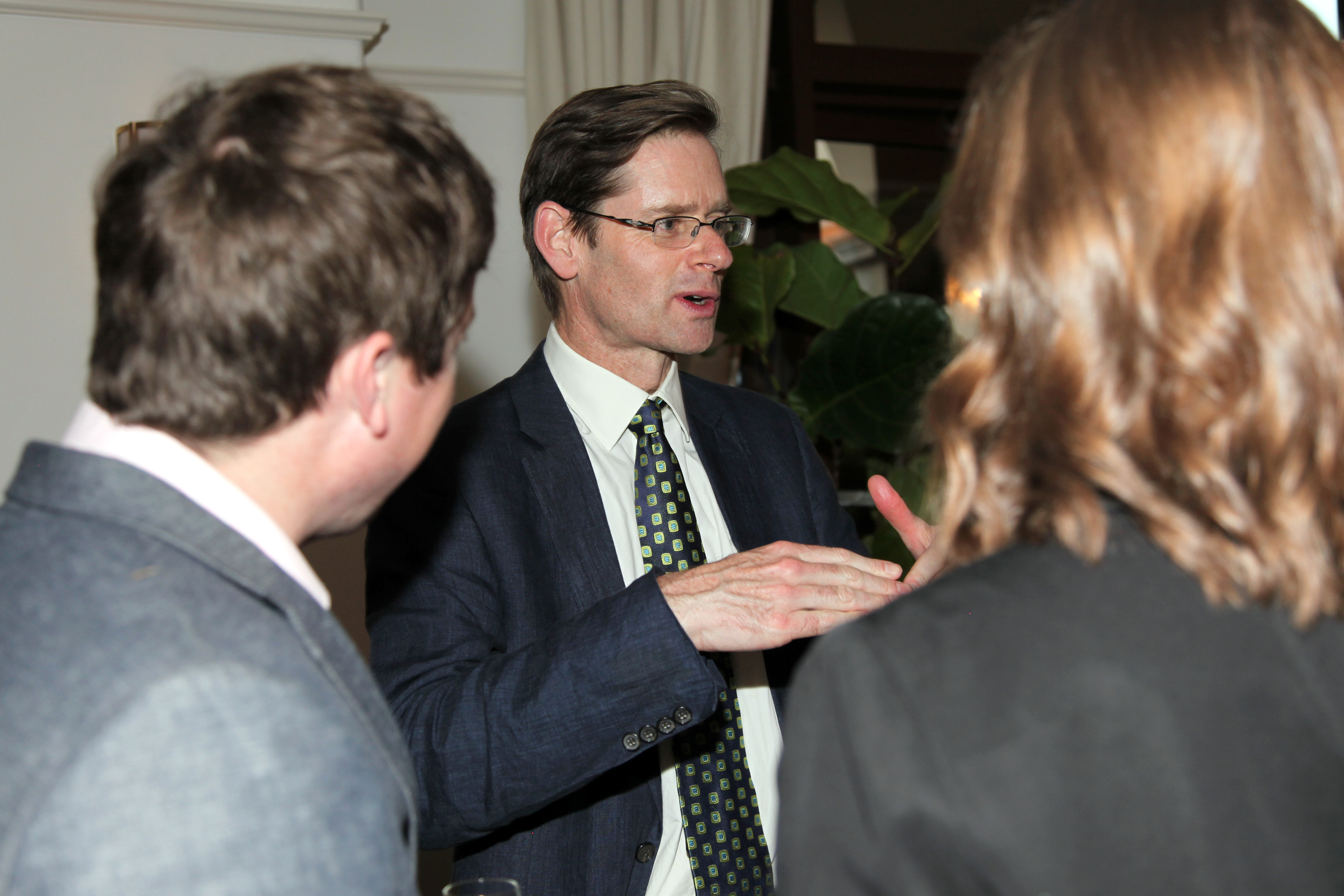
Alec Russell at a Berggruen Institute event, May 2017

Alec Russell is an English journalist. As of April 2024 he is foreign editor of the Financial Times.

== Career ==
Russell was analysis editor and world news editor of the Financial Times, before being appointed editor of FT Weekend effective April 2016.

In November 2022 it was announced that Russell would assume the new role of foreign editor effective March 2023. As of April 2024 he is still in this position.

== Recognition ==
He was nominated for the 2008 Pulitzer Prize and for British foreign correspondent of the year.

== Books ==
Russell has written three books: Prejudice and Plum Brandy, about his time in the Balkans; Big Men, Little Men, a reflection on his time in South Africa in the mid-90s; and After Mandela, about South Africa under Thabo Mbeki.

- Prejudice and Plum Brandy: Tales of a Balkan Stringer. London: Michael Joseph. 1993. ISBN 9780718136987. OCLC 29466621.
- Big Men, Little People: Encounters in Africa. London: Macmillan. 1999. ISBN 9780333753590. OCLC 41309130.
- After Mandela: The Battle for the Soul of South Africa. London: Hutchinson. 2009. ISBN 9780091926014. OCLC 317251399.
