= Alec Morgan =

Australian rules footballer (1908–1957)

Personal information
- Full name: Alexander Mitchell Morgan
- Born: 5 June 1908; Castlemaine, Victoria
- Died: 10 March 1957 (aged 48); Royal Melbourne Hospital, Parkville, Victoria
- Original team: Yarrawonga

Playing career^{1}
Years	Club	Games (Goals)
1932	Hawthorn	1 (0)
- ^{1} Playing statistics correct to the end of 1932.

Alexander Mitchell Morgan (5 June 1908 – 10 March 1957) was an Australian rules footballer who played for the Hawthorn Football Club in the Victorian Football League (VFL).

== Family ==
The son of David Morgan, and Mary Moir Morgan, née Mitchell, Alexander Mitchell Morgan was born at Castlemaine, Victoria on 5 June 1908.

He married Estell Mavis Hartshorn (1915–present) at Mildura on 16 April 1935.

== Football ==
Recruited from Yarrawonga, Morgan played in Hawthorn's Round 1 game against Collingwood. He was dropped to the Seconds and did not manage another senior game.

== Military service ==
Morgan later served in the Australian Army during World War II.

== Death ==
He died at the Royal Melbourne Hospital, in Parkville, Victoria, on 10 March 1957.
