= Alexander Jackson (rugby union) =

Irish rugby union player (1890–1969)

- Full name: Alexander R. V. Jackson
- Born: 25 August 1890 Dublin, Ireland
- Died: 31 January 1969 (aged 78) Hastings, England

Rugby union career
- Position: Centre
International career
Years	Team	Apps	(Points)
1911–14	Ireland	10	(9)

Alexander R. V. Jackson (25 August 1890 – 31 January 1969) was an Irish international rugby union player.

== Biography ==
Jackson was born in Dublin and educated at Portora Royal School.

A centre three–quarter, Jackson captained Dublin club Wanderers and from 1911 to 1914 was a regular for Ireland, gaining 10 caps. His three international tries included a double in Ireland's win over France at Cork in 1911.

Jackson was held as a prisoner of war in World War I.

== See also ==
- List of Ireland national rugby union players
