= Alec Farley =

English footballer

Personal information
- Full name: Alexander John Farley
- Date of birth: 11 May 1925
- Place of birth: Finchley, England
- Date of death: 23 February 2010 (aged 84)
- Place of death: Southampton, England
- Height: 5 ft 11 in (1.80 m)
- Position: Left back

Senior career*
Years	Team	Apps	(Gls)
–1944	Finchley		
1944–1945	Cromwell Athletic		
1945–1948	Leyton Orient	15	(0)
	Bournemouth	0	(0)
- * Club domestic league appearances and goals

Alexander John Farley (11 May 1925 – 23 February 2010) was an English professional footballer who played in the Football League for Leyton Orient as a left back.

== Personal life ==
During the Second World War, Farley served at home as a PE instructor in the Irish Guards.

== Career statistics ==
Appearances and goals by club, season and competition
Club	Season	League			FA Cup		Total	
Club	Season	Division	Apps	Goals	Apps	Goals	Apps	Goals
Clapton Orient	1945–46	―			2	0	2	0
Career total			0	0	2	0	2	0
