= Alec Crozier =

Australian rules footballer (1904–1974)

Personal information
- Full name: Alexander Wilson Crozier
- Born: 9 July 1904; Kensington, Victoria
- Died: 16 June 1974 (aged 69); Yarraville, Victoria
- Original team: Caulfield
- Height: 188 cm (6 ft 2 in)
- Weight: 88 kg (194 lb)
- Position: Follower

Playing career^{1}
Years	Club	Games (Goals)
1926–27	Hawthorn	4 (0)
- ^{1} Playing statistics correct to the end of 1927.

Alexander Wilson Crozier (9 July 1904 – 16 June 1974) was an Australian rules footballer who played with Hawthorn in the Victorian Football League (VFL).

== Early life ==
The son of John Crozier (1870–1930) and Agnes Catherine Crozier, nee Alexander (1879–1948), Alexander Wilson Crozier was born at Kensington on 9 July 1904.

== Football ==
Crozier joined Hawthorn at the start of the 1926 VFL season from Caulfield. After spending almost all season in the reserves he played in the final game of the season against Melbourne. Despite not making the senior squad at the start of the year he was frequently named in the better players in the reserves in 1927 and played another three senior games.

== Later life ==
In 1934 Alec Crozier married Lorna Pearl Tepper and they lived in various areas in Melbourne until his death in June 1974. He was cremated at Fawkner Memorial Park.
