= Alec Horwood =

Recipient of the Victoria Cross

Alec George Horwood
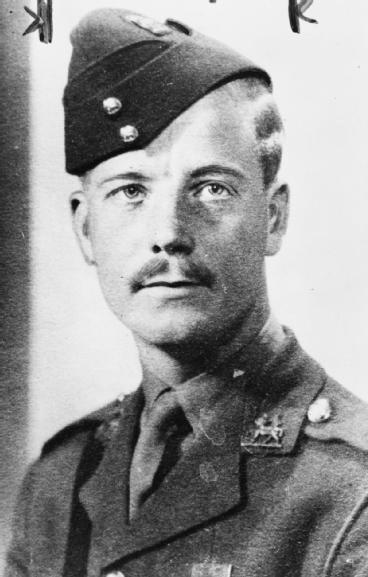
- Born: 6 January 1914; Deptford, England
- Died: 20 January 1944 (aged 30); Kyauchaw, British Burma
- Military career
- Allegiance: United Kingdom
- Branch: British Army
- Service years: 1939–1944
- Rank: Lieutenant
- Service number: 165583
- Units: Queen's Royal Regiment (West Surrey)
- Conflicts: Second World War: Western Front; French and Low Countries campaign; Battle of France; Battle of Dunkirk (POW); Pacific War; Burma Campaign; Burma campaign 1944 (DOW)
- Awards: Victoria Cross; Distinguished Conduct Medal

Lieutenant Alec George Horwood, VC, DCM (6 January 1914 – 20 January 1944) was a British Army officer and an English recipient of the Victoria Cross (VC), the highest award for gallantry in the face of the enemy that can be awarded to British and Commonwealth forces.

== Details ==
Mobilised for war in 1939, Horwood was captured at Dunkirk and managed to escape via Antwerp. He was awarded the Distinguished Conduct Medal for his efforts.

Horwood was 30 years old, and a lieutenant in the 1/6th Battalion, Queen's Royal Regiment (West Surrey), British Army, attached to 1st Battalion, Northamptonshire Regiment during the Second World War when the following deed took place for which he was awarded the Victoria Cross.

On 18 January 1944 at Kyauchaw, British Burma (now Myanmar), Lieutenant Horwood accompanied a company into action with his forward mortar observation post. Throughout the day he was in an exposed position and under intense fire, but he came back at night with most valuable information about the enemy. On 19 January he moved forward and established another observation post, directing accurate mortar fire in support of two attacks, and also carrying out personal reconnaissance, deliberately drawing the enemy fire so that their position could be definitely located. On 20 January he volunteered to lead the attack and while doing so was mortally wounded.

His Victoria Cross is on display in the Lord Ashcroft Gallery at the Imperial War Museum, London.
