= Alec Burgess =

English cricketer (1906–1990)

Personal information
- Full name: Alec Andrews Burgess
- Born: 2 January 1906; Peterborough, Northamptonshire, England
- Died: 20 November 1990 (aged 84); Waveney, Suffolk, England
- Batting: Right-handed
- Bowling: Leg break

Domestic team information
- Years: Team
- 1934–1935: Suffolk
- 1929: Northamptonshire

Career statistics
Competition	First-class
Matches	1
Runs scored	14
Batting average	7.00
100s/50s	–/–
Top score	13
Balls bowled	18
Wickets	–
Bowling average	–
5 wickets in innings	–
10 wickets in match	–
Best bowling	–
Catches/stumpings	1/–
- Source: Cricinfo, 17 November 2011

Alec Andrews Burgess (2 January 1906 – 20 November 1990) was an English cricketer. Burgess was a right-handed batsman who was a leg break bowler. He was born at Peterborough, Northamptonshire.

Burgess made a single first-class appearance for Northamptonshire against Sussex at the Town Ground, Peterborough in the 1929 County Championship. In Northamptonshire's first-innings he was dismissed for 13 by Albert Wensley, while in their second-innings he was dismissed for a single run by Maurice Tate. He later played for Suffolk in the 1934 and 1935 Minor Counties Championship, making three appearances.

He died at Waveney, Suffolk on 20 November 1990.
