= Alec Thurlow =

English footballer

Personal information
- Full name: Alec Charles Edward Thurlow
- Date of birth: 24 February 1922
- Place of birth: Diss, England
- Date of death: 5 March 1956 (aged 34)
- Place of death: Kelling, England
- Position: Goalkeeper

Senior career*
Years	Team	Apps	(Gls)
1946–1949	Manchester City	21	(0)
- * Club domestic league appearances and goals

Alec Charles Edward Thurlow (24 February 1922 – 5 March 1956) was a footballer who played as a goalkeeper in the Football League for Manchester City.
