= Alec Cameron (rugby union) =

Scotland international rugby union player

- Born: Alexander William Cumming Cameron; 3 March 1866 Oban, Scotland
- Died: 14 March 1957 (aged 91) Swansea, Wales

Rugby union career
- Position: Full Back
Amateur team(s)
Years	Team	Apps	(Points)
-	Watsonians		
Provincial / State sides
Years	Team	Apps	(Points)
1886	Edinburgh District		
1887	East of Scotland District		
International career
Years	Team	Apps	(Points)
1887-94	Scotland	3	(0)

Alec Cameron (3 March 1866 – 14 March 1957) was a Scotland international rugby union player.

== Rugby Union career ==
=== Amateur career ===
Cameron played rugby union for Watsonians.

=== Provincial career ===
He played for Edinburgh District in their inter-city match against Glasgow District on 4 December 1886.

He played for East of Scotland District in their match against West of Scotland District on 19 January 1887.

=== International career ===
Cameron was capped 3 times by Scotland, from 1887 to 1894.
