= Alec Sutherland =

Aviator with the Royal Air Force and swimming coach

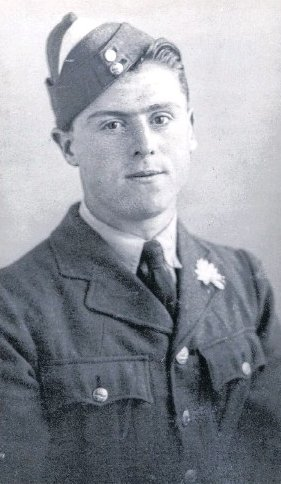
- 1945
- Born: Alexander Ross Sutherland; 19 August 1922; Inverness, Scotland
- Died: 16 April 2014 (aged 91)
- Military career
- Allegiance: United Kingdom
- Branch: British Army; Royal Air Force
- Service years: 1941–1946
- Rank: Flight Sergeant
- Unit: Bomber Command
- Awards: Bomber Command Clasp

Alexander Ross Sutherland MBE (19 August 1922 – 16 April 2014) was a Scottish Royal Air Force (RAF) airman. As a teenager he helped establish the Inverness squadron of the Air Training Corps, becoming their first senior non-commissioned officer. Enlisting with the RAF, he became a bombardier/radio operator, flying ten bombing raids over Germany with No. 5 Group RAF in Avro Lancasters during World War II.

A librarian in civilian life, he competed successfully in swimming competitions into his late 80s, coached swimming and participated in competitive water polo, gaining various awards and honours, including an Order of the British Empire (MBE). He was also an expert mountaineer and taught children about his experiences in the RAF.

== Early life ==
Sutherland was born in Inverness, Scotland, on 19 August 1922. He was the oldest son of William and Jessie Sutherland and his siblings were brother Billy and sister Nancy. His father was the chief clerk at Inverness railway station. He was educated at Merkinch Primary School and Inverness Technical High School. When he was fourteen, he joined the Inverness County Library Service and delivered books to all the schools in the county.

Sutherland was a founding member of the London, Midland and Scottish Railway Swimming Club. In 1937, the club was set up contemporaneous with the opening of the town's new baths. He swam in a children's balloon race, the first competitive event held at the pool.

== Military service ==
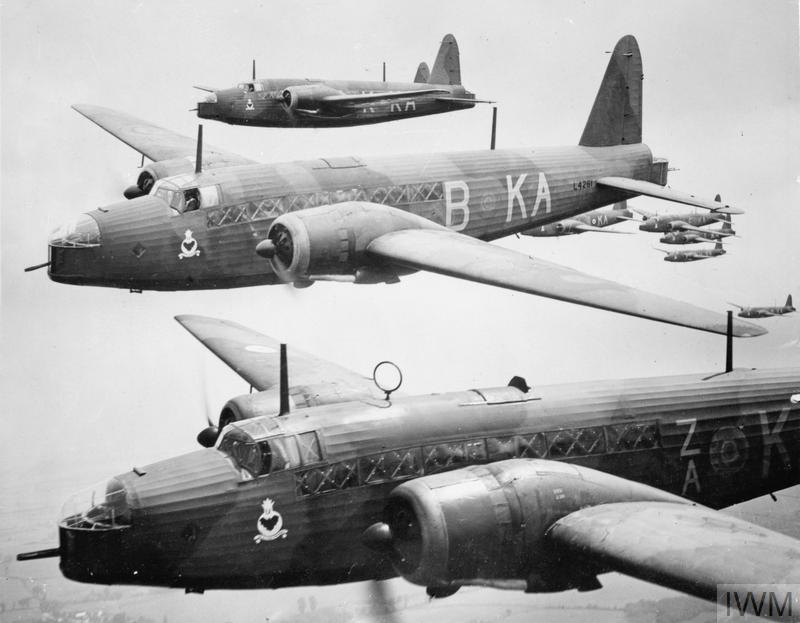
Vickers Wellington squadron in flight in World War II

Sutherland aspired to be a pilot, but his night vision was impaired by snow blindness. He joined the Air Defence Cadet Corps in 1940 and with the founding of the Air Training Corps in 1941 he helped establish the Inverness squadron, becoming the squadron's first senior non-commissioned officer. He became the cadet flight sergeant when the corps were provided with training by RAF instructors. The squadron had disassembled a Hawker Audax trainer bi-plane and reassembled it inside their facilities, which was used for training. They also trained at RAF Dalcross and RAF Inverness using Airspeed Oxfords, de Havilland Gypsy Moths, Dragon Rapide biplanes and Boulton Paul Defiants.

In October 1941, Sutherland enlisted with the RAF in Edinburgh. After reporting for duty at London's Lord's Cricket Ground, he went to No. 17 Initial Training Wing at Scarborough and No. 1 Radio School RAF to receive aircrew training. In November 1943, he completed his wireless operator qualification. This led to advanced training in Canada under the British Commonwealth Air Training Plan scheme at RCAF Station Port Albert. He was a radio operator at RAF Nutts Corner in Northern Ireland, working in Avro Ansons with Coastal Command.

He became a bombardier/radio operator with 14 Operational Training Unit flying Vickers Wellingtons. He was then assigned to Avro Lancaster heavy bombers in Bomber Command, flying ten bombing raids over Germany with No 5 Group. In May 1945, after VE Day, Sutherland performed in London for the RAF at a celebratory Aquacade swimming show to music. His scheduled assignment to the Far East was rescinded when the Japanese Empire surrendered at the conclusion of the war. He was reassigned to conduct RAF flight trainings and deliver bombers to scrapyards. In 1946, he was discharged from the RAF. He received the 1st Class Good Conduct Badge.

== Post war civilian life ==
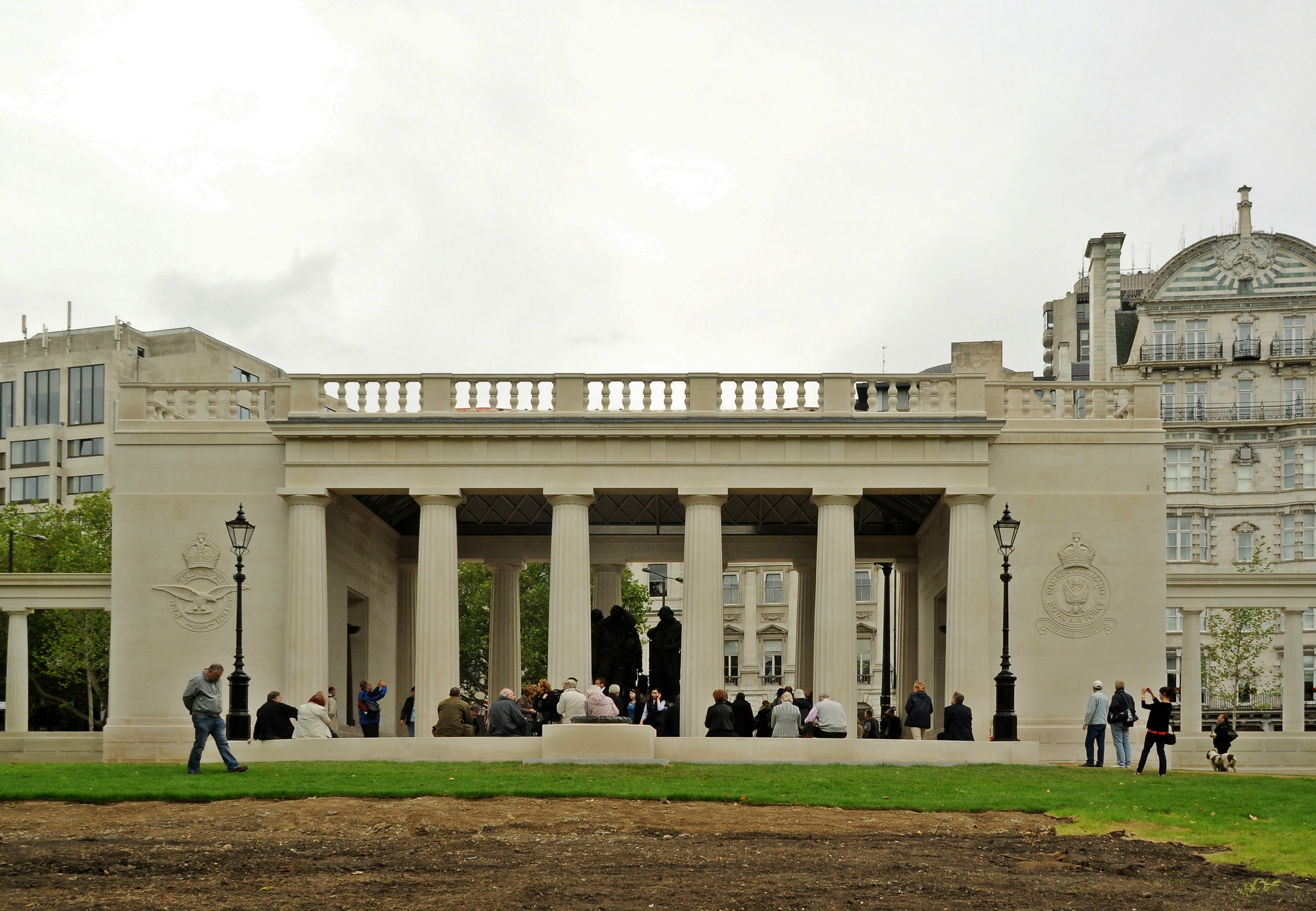
RAF Bomber Command Memorial

After leaving the military, Sutherland returned to Inverness and worked as an assistant librarian. In 1975, upon a local government reorganisation, Sutherland was transferred to employment at the housing department for the Inverness District. He coached a team at the Inverness Swimming Club, participating in competitive water polo. Sutherland competed in swimming competitions into his late 80s, garnering several gold medals in the veteran sections meets, including two Masters swimming gold medals in 2007. In 1989, he was awarded the Inverness Sports Personality award, in the senior category, for services to swimming. In 2008, a life membership to Scottish Swimming was conferred. In 2009, Sutherland was made a Member of the Most Excellent Order of the British Empire for his work in the sport.

He was a hillwalker and mountaineer, climbed Mont Blanc, and was a founder of the Inverness Mountaineering Club. He became an expert on the Cuillins, Cairngorms, and Glen Affric's hills and was custodian of the bothy at Shenavall, below the An Teallach massif. He was a county librarian and taught children competitive swimming skills. In 2002, he carried the Commonwealth Games baton. In 2007, he received gold medals at Masters swimming in Manchester. In 2007, he was awarded the BBC Scotland Sports Personality of the Year's Unsung Hero Award. Inverness Leisure named an executive room in his honour. He participated in the procession of the Riding of the Scottish Parliament.

The British Government chose not to strike campaign medals for Bomber Command because of the civilian deaths during the 1945 Bombing of Dresden. In 1984 the Air Marshal Arthur "Bomber" Harris's widow led the failed effort to create belated commemorative medals for members of Bomber Command for their contribution to World War II. While recognizing the bombing was brutal and relentless as the war in Europe came to a close, Sutherland said it was necessary. He taught children about the history of the RAF. He showed them his personal memorabilia, including his flight suit and a swastika flag received from a former prisoner of war Sutherland helped after release. In 2012, he attended the unveiling of the RAF Bomber Command Memorial. Sutherland placed a message to his fallen compatriots within. He was a recipient of the Bomber Command clasp.

== Personal life ==
Sutherland met his wife, Rhonda (née Milne) at a dance in 1951, and they were wed the following year. They had two sons and ran a bed and breakfast.

On 16 April 2014, Sutherland died following a period of illness. His funeral was at the Huntly Street Methodist Church. Air Cadets of the Inverness 161 Squadron in Inverness acted as an honour guard during the ceremony.
