= Alec Down =

British archaeologist (1914–1995)

Alec George Down (9 August 1914 – 25 December 1995) was a British archaeologist.

== Background ==
Alec Down served in the army and studied after the Second World War Engineering in London. 1958 he visited the archaeological site of the Roman villa at Bignor. He was so fascinated about archaeology that in the following year he joined an archaeological mission under Barry Cunliffe. In the next year he already supervised an archaeological enterprise and was in the following years involved in several missions in Sussex. 1973 he was appointed full-time Director of Excavations by the Chichester District Council and dedicated his work to rescuing excavations in this town and in Sussex.

== Works ==
- Roman Chichester, Chichester 1988, ISBN 0850334357.
- with M. Rule: Chichester Excavations 1, Oxford 1971.
- Chichester Excavations 2-6, Chichester 1974–1989.
- with John Magilton: Chichester Excavations 8, Chichester 1993.
