= Andrena birtwelli =

Scientific classification
- Domain: Eukaryota
- Kingdom: Animalia
- Phylum: Arthropoda
- Class: Insecta
- Order: Hymenoptera
- Family: Andrenidae
- Genus: Andrena
- Species: A. birtwelli

Binomial name
- Andrena birtwelli Cockerell, 1901

Species of bee

The Birtwell's miner bee (Andrena birtwelli) is a species of miner bee in the family Andrenidae. It is found in North America.
