= Charlie Kerr (cricketer) =

New Zealand cricketer

Allen Kerr
Personal information
- Full name: Allen Charles Kerr
- Born: 13 June 1906; Mudgee, New South Wales, Australia
- Died: 28 November 1985 (aged 79); Auckland, New Zealand
- Batting: Left-handed
- Bowling: Right-arm off-break
- Relatives: Alec Kerr (father)

Domestic team information
- Years: Team
- 1941/42–1945/46: Auckland

Career statistics
Competition	First-class
Matches	14
Runs scored	686
Batting average	32.66
100s/50s	1/4
Top score	122
Balls bowled	2,910
Wickets	37
Bowling average	29.89
5 wickets in innings	2
10 wickets in match	0
Best bowling	5/55
Catches/stumpings	10/–
- Source: ESPNcricinfo, 13 June 2016

Allen Charles Kerr (13 June 1906 – 28 November 1985) was a New Zealand cricketer. He played 14 first-class matches for Auckland and other teams in New Zealand between 1941 and 1946. He also played for Green Lane. He was an all-rounder.

Kerr was the son of Auckland cricketer Alec Kerr and was born at Mudgee, New South Wales, in 1906. He scored a century on his first-class debut for Auckland against Wellington in February 1942 as well as taking five wickets in the match. Against Wellington in February 1945 he took 5 for 55 and 4 for 37 with his off-spin.

Following his death in 1985 an obituary was published in the 1986 edition of the New Zealand Cricket Almanack and the main stand at the Auckland Domain ground was named in his honour.
