= Alec Hall (English footballer) =

English footballer

Personal information
- Full name: Alexander Frank Hall
- Date of birth: 17 September 1909
- Place of birth: Grimsby, England
- Date of death: 1992 (aged 82–83)
- Height: 5 ft 9 in (1.75 m)
- Position: Wing half

Senior career*
Years	Team	Apps	(Gls)
1928–1929	Cleethorpes Town		
1929–1948	Grimsby Town	358	(4)
1948–19??	Alford United		
- * Club domestic league appearances and goals

Alexander Frank Hall (17 September 1909 – 1992) was an English professional footballer who played as a wing half.
