= Alex (automobile) =

1908 prototype light car

The Alex was a Scottish prototype light car produced in 1908 by Alexander and Co. of Edinburgh. The sole car made utilized a 14/18 hp 4-cylinder Gnome engine and a Rubery Owen chassis. Production was stopped after the prototype because costs were found to be too great.
