= Alec Mathieson =

Australian rules footballer (1921–2022)

Personal information
- Full name: Alexander James Mathieson
- Born: 11 May 1921; Colac, Victoria, Australia
- Died: 13 May 2022 (aged 101)
- Original teams: RAAF / Newtown & Chilwell
- Height: 180 cm (5 ft 11 in)
- Weight: 83 kg (183 lb)

Playing career^{1}
Years	Club	Games (Goals)
1944	Geelong	7 (1)
- ^{1} Playing statistics correct to the end of 1944.

Alexander James Mathieson (11 May 1921 – 13 May 2022) was an Australian rules footballer who played for the Geelong Football Club in the Victorian Football League (VFL).

In the same year he played for Geelong he enlisted to serve in the Royal Australian Air Force in World War II.
