= Alec Law =

Scottish footballer

Personal information
- Full name: Alexander Law
- Date of birth: 28 April 1910
- Place of birth: Bathgate, Scotland
- Height: 5 ft 9 in (1.75 m)
- Position: Centre forward

Senior career*
Years	Team	Apps	(Gls)
–	Fauldhouse United		
1933–1935	Sheffield Wednesday	9	(4)
1935–1939	Brighton & Hove Albion	66	(36)
1939	Chester	2	(1)
- * Club domestic league appearances and goals

Alexander Law (28 April 1910 – after 1938) was a Scottish professional footballer who scored 41 goals from 77 appearances in the English Football League playing for Sheffield Wednesday, Brighton & Hove Albion and Chester. He was Brighton & Hove Albion's top scorer in the 1935–36 season with 27 goals in all competitions, and played twice for Chester in the 1939–40 Football League season abandoned because of the Second World War. Law was born in Bathgate, West Lothian, and played as a centre forward.
