= Alec Robertson =

Alec Robertson may refer to:

- Alec Robertson (bowls) (1884–1977), lawn bowls competitor for New Zealand
- Alec Robertson (music critic) (1892–1982), British writer, broadcaster and music critic
- Alec Robertson (rugby union) (1877–1941), Scottish rugby union player

== See also ==
- Alexander Robertson (disambiguation)
