= Alec Gray =

Alec Gray may refer to:

- Alec Gray (footballer) (1891–1945), Australian rules footballer
- Alec Gray (horticulturalist) (1895–1986), English plantsman
- Alec Gray (socialist), English socialist
