= Arthur Jackson (British sport shooter) =

British sport shooter

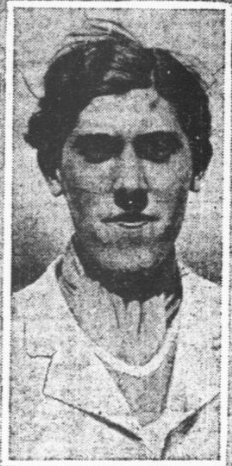

Personal information
- Full name: Arthur Jackson
- Born: 19 May 1877
- Died: 1960 (aged 82–83)

Sport
- Sport: Sports shooting

Arthur Thomas Jackson DSO*** (19 May 1877 – 1960) was a British sports shooter. He competed for the British Olympic team at the 1908 Summer Olympics. He fought in World War I and was injured three times. As of 1918, he was a lieutenant-colonel, and had earned a third bar for his Distinguished Service Order.
