= Alec Greven =

American writer

Alec Greven is a New York Times best-selling self-help author. His first book, How to Talk to Girls, was published when he was nine years old. He has subsequently published two additional books, How to Talk to Moms and How to Talk to Dads. He released his fourth book, How to Talk to Santa, in 2009, and a fifth book, Rules for School, in 2010.

He appeared on The Ellen DeGeneres Show in February, and December 2008 and April 2009, and on NBC's Late Night with Conan O'Brien in December 2008. On February 12, 2009, he also appeared on The Tonight Show with Jay Leno.

Greven appeared a second time on The Ellen DeGeneres Show in April 2009 to promote his two new books, How to Talk to Dads and How to Talk to Moms.

== How to Talk to Girls ==
Greven's first book, How to Talk to Girls, started as an elementary school project and ended up on the New York Times' best sellers list. He wrote the book after observing boys in the playground and their mistakes when talking to girls.
