= Alec Proudfoot =

Australian rules footballer, born 1906

Personal information
- Full name: Alexander Grenville Stewart Proudfoot
- Born: 14 September 1906; Queenstown, Tasmania
- Died: 24 June 1995 (aged 88)
- Original team: Cooper's Creek
- Height: 188 cm (6 ft 2 in)
- Weight: 90 kg (198 lb)

Playing career^{1}
Years	Club	Games (Goals)
1926–1927	St Kilda	4 (1)
1927–1928	Brunswick (VFA)	24 (9)
1929	Melbourne	1 (0)
1930–1931	Brunswick (VFA)	14 (2)
1932–1934	Coburg (VFA)	29 (13)
Total		72 (25)
- ^{1} Playing statistics correct to the end of 1929.

Alexander Grenville Stewart Proudfoot (14 September 1906 – 24 June 1995) was an Australian rules footballer who played for the St Kilda Football Club and Melbourne Football Club in the Victorian Football League (VFL).

== Family ==
The son of Alexander George Proudfoot (1873–1943) and Mabel Clemence (May) Grenville (1880–1906), Alexander Grenville Stewart Proudfoot was born at Queenstown, Tasmania on 14 September 1906. His mother died when he was one month old and he moved with his father to Coopers Creek in Gippsland.

Proudfoot was the nephew of Collingwood player Bill Proudfoot.

== Football ==
Proudfoot initially travelled from Erica in Gippsland to play with St Kilda but after four senior appearances over 12 months he moved to Brunswick during the 1927 season.

After two strong season with Brunswick in the Victorian Football Association, Proudfoot transferred to Melbourne for the 1929 season. He made a single senior appearance in Round 14 before returning to Brunswick in 1930 and then moved to Coburg in 1932.
