= Alec Marks =

Australian cricketer

Personal information
- Full name: Alexander Edward Marks
- Born: 10 December 1910; Toowong, Australia
- Died: 28 July 1983 (aged 72); Sydney, Australia
- Source: ESPNcricinfo, 7 January 2017

Alec Marks (10 December 1910 – 28 July 1983) was an Australian cricketer. He played 35 first-class matches for New South Wales between 1928/29 and 1936/37. He also played for Randwick Cricket Club.

== See also ==
- List of New South Wales representative cricketers
