= Alec Fyfe =

Australian rules footballer, born 1909

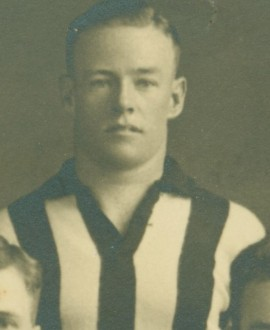
- Fyfe in 1935

Personal information
- Full name: Alec Fyfe
- Born: 12 August 1909; Melbourne
- Died: 1 December 1973 (aged 64)
- Original team: Camberwell
- Height: 178 cm (5 ft 10 in)
- Weight: 77 kg (170 lb)

Playing career^{1}
Years	Club	Games (Goals)
1934–1935	Collingwood	11 (3)
- ^{1} Playing statistics correct to the end of 1935.

Alec Fyfe (12 August 1909 – 1 December 1973) was an Australian rules footballer who played for the Collingwood Football Club in the Victorian Football League (VFL).
