= Alec Hellewell =

English footballer

Personal information
- Full name: Alexander Hellewell
- Date of birth: 1880
- Place of birth: Sheffield, England
- Date of death: 1934 (aged 53–54)
- Position: Inside forward

Senior career*
Years	Team	Apps	(Gls)
1898–1899	Mexborough		
1899–1910	Barnsley	244	(53)
Total		244	(53)
- * Club domestic league appearances and goals

Alexander Hellewell (1880–1934) was an English footballer who played in the Football League for Barnsley.
