= Alec Tayler =

Australian rules footballer

Personal information
- Full name: Alexander Tayler
- Born: 16 May 1892
- Died: 30 October 1964 (aged 72); Geelong, Victoria
- Height: 182 cm (6 ft 0 in)
- Weight: 73 kg (161 lb)

Playing career^{1}
Years	Club	Games (Goals)
1923	Geelong	5 (0)
- ^{1} Playing statistics correct to the end of 1923.

Alexander "Alec" Tayler (16 May 1892 – 30 October 1964) was an Australian rules footballer who played for the Geelong Football Club in the Victorian Football League (VFL).

== Football ==
Tayler joined Geelong from Lara at the beginning of the 1923 season. His performances in the Geelong junior team quickly gained attention, after his third game it was stated that "this player on present form can hardly be overlooked for League football." He made his senior debut in July in a victory against Carlton and played five games as a half forward. He dropped out of the team after contracting influenza and was stated to be returning via the seconds but never again played a senior game. Tayler was still playing with Geelong reserves in 1925.

== Death ==
Alec Tayler died in Geelong on 30 October 1964 and is buried at Geelong Eastern Cemetery.
