= Alec John Dawson =

English traveller and novelist (1872 - 1951)

A. J. Dawson
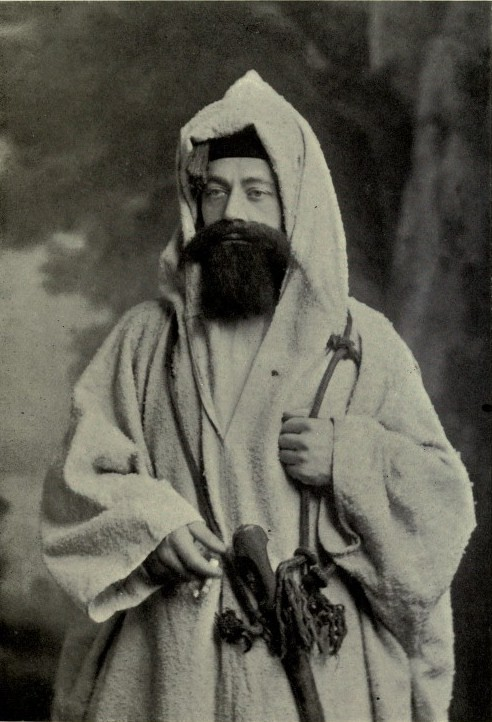
- A. J. Dawson in Moorish dress, from his book Things Seen in Morocco, 1904
- Born: Alec John Dawson; 1872; Wandsworth
- Died: 3 February 1951 (aged 78–79); St Leonards-on-Sea
- Spouse: Elizabeth Drummond

Alec John Dawson (1872 - 3 February 1951), generally known as A. J. Dawson (pseudonyms Captain Dawson, Major Dawson, Howard Kerr, Nicholas Freydon) was an English author, traveller and novelist. During World War I he attained the rank of Major, and was awarded the MBE and Croix de Guerre in recognition of his work as a military propagandist. Dawson published over thirty books, the one best remembered today probably being the animal adventure story Finn the Wolfhound (1908).

== Early life and career ==
Dawson was born in Wandsworth, England, the third son of Edward (1839-1906) and Sarah Ann Dawson née Hill (1843-1911). His father worked as a collector for the local gas company. He left school early to become an apprentice in the Merchant Navy, but jumped ship in Australia after a couple of voyages. For the next few years he was something of a drifter, working for a spell as a farmer and then joining the staff of a Melbourne newspaper. Some five years later he decided to become an author, travelling for several years around Australasia, India, Ceylon, Mauritius, South America, West Africa, Morocco and Europe.

He used the pen-name Howard Kerr for his first published novel, Leeway (1896). Further publications as A.J. Dawson soon followed: two collections of short stories (Mere Sentiment and In the Bight of Benin) and two novels (God's Foundling and Middle Greyness) in 1897 alone. Dawson's early fiction draws on his own upbringing and travels, literary critic John Sutherland singles out for praise Daniel Whyte (1899), about his younger adventures in Australasia, and The Story of Ronald Kestrel (1900), dealing with his later career as a writer. African Nights Entertainments (1900), another collection of short stories, suggests a debt to Rudyard Kipling's Plain Tales from the Hills.

== Siblings ==
Dawson had two older brothers Ernest Nathaniel Dawson (1864-1949) and Walter Hill Dawson (1869-1954) both of whom joined the civil service and held posts in Burma (then part of India). In his youth Ernest had sailed to Australia before he secured a position in the Civil Service as a district judge presiding in Burma. He then served in the army first in Burma and then in a cavalry unit in South Africa in 1900 and became friends with Rudyard Kipling. Ernest later delivered a lecture to the Kipling Society in 1939.

Dawson, as well as his brother Ernest, became friends with the novelist Joseph Conrad after being introduced to him by H. G. Wells around 1902. Conrad later on wrote the foreword to Dawson's Britain's Life-Boats. Both Ernest and Alec attended Conrad's funeral.

His other brother Walter joined the India Civil Service in November 1888 and in late 1902 was appointed as Deputy Commissioner, Burma. His younger sister, Sylvia Mary Dawson (1887-1934), became known as an actress in the English theatre prior to the First World War performing roles in plays by George Bernard Shaw, as well as in various provincial productions.

== Marriage and Divorce ==
By 1898 he was back in England, marrying in that year Elizabeth Drummond. Elizabeth (1874-1932) was the daughter of the Bradford worsted manufacturer John Drummond and his wife Mary. Dawson and his wife were living in Yorkshire in 1900, and their sole child John Delacourt Dawson was born on 3 May 1900. Dawson appears to have separated from his wife very early in their marriage and the 1901 census records lend support to this understanding of their relationship. The 1901 Census records Dawson as residing at "The Croft", Crondall, Hampshire and the other occupants of this household were William Gambrill (servant aged 58) and Ethel Gambrill (servant aged 25). The 1901 Census shows his wife Elizabeth and their son John living with her parents in Yorkshire. In 1908, Elizabeth filed a petition for divorce.

The 1911 Census records Dawson as residing at Chequers, Little Bardfield, Braintree, Essex. The 1911 Census indicates that Dawson was married for about twelve years and that there was one child born. The only other occupants of Chequers was Ethel Gambrill (now described as his half-sister --- but this appears to be at odds with official records which show that she was born in Hackney on 13 July 1876 and baptised at St John's Church, Hackney on 12 November 1876, with the parish register describing her parents as William and Harriet Gambrill [née Gregory]) and a household servant named Nelly Dowland. The nature and status of Dawson's relationship to Ethel Gambrill (1877-1964) is a matter of conjecture but she was living with him up until he died (in the 1939 Register they are shown as living in the same household at 62 Warrior Square, Hastings) and she was named as his sole beneficiary in his will. In turn, records relating to Ethel Gambrill's estate show that John Delacourt Dawson was granted probate on 30 July 1964. The probate register entries for both Alec and Ethel give 3 Maze Hill Mansions, St Leonards-on-Sea, Hastings as their place of residence at the time of their respective deaths. Ethel Gambrill appears to have been known to Joseph Conrad as he passed on his "kindest regards" to her in a letter addressed to Ernest Dawson.

Dawson's seemingly cryptic reference to the ‘Mistress of the Kennels’ to whom Finn the Wolfhound (1908) was dedicated, may refer to Ethel Gambrill rather than to his ex-wife Elizabeth, the latter who died in Yorkshire aged 58 on 7 September 1932. Dawson dedicated Everybody's Dog Book to Ethel Gambrill. In 1904, Dawson had a house in Sussex and described himself as a novelist and traveller, dividing his time between Sussex and Morocco. Morocco was the setting for several of his novels (Bismillah, 1898; Joseph Khassan, 1901; Hidden Manna, 1902; The Fortunes of Farthings, 1905) while Things seen in Morocco (1904) combines short stories, travel writing and political analysis.

== Dog breeder and novels featuring dogs ==
Dawson was also a dog-lover who had become interested in the revival of the Irish Wolfhound breed and served as Honorary Secretary of the Irish Wolfhound Club. His own dog Tynagh and her son Gareth, who was described as the largest and finest specimen of his breed to date, served as the models for Tara and Finn in Finn the Wolfhound (1908). This is probably Dawson's best-remembered and certainly his most frequently reprinted work: Finn, a champion Irish Wolfhound, is taken from England to Australia where he undergoes a series of adventures, being exhibited as a wild animal in a circus and escaping to live in the outback before eventually finding his old master and saving his life. Dawson also bred Bloodhounds and a sequel, Jan (1915), features Finn's son by the Bloodhound bitch Desdemona. Jan is taken to Canada where he survives similarly arduous adventures, serving with the Royal Canadian Mounted Police (Mounties) and as a sled dog. After the First World War, Dawson would also write Peter of Monkslease (1924), the story of a Bloodhound, and several dog reference books.

== Dawson and the First World War ==
To make ends meet Dawson also continued to work as a journalist and reviewer, most notably for the Athenaeum, the Standard (forerunner of the Evening Standard) and the Daily Express. He was amongst those concerned about Great Britain's unpreparedness for a potential war with Germany, from 1905 assisting the National Service League with its attempts to introduce universal military service. Following a trip across Canada in 1907-8 he also became editor of The Standard of Empire, a weekly offshoot of the Standard set up to encourage emigration to, and investment in, the Dominions. Dawson's desire for closer links within the Empire, and his belief in the potentially reinvigorating influence of the Dominions on the Old Country, inform his novel The Message (1907), one of many examples of anti-German invasion literature published in the run-up to 1914, and also The Land of His Fathers (1910) with its Canadian millionaire hero. By contrast the anonymously published Record of Nicholas Freydon: an Autobiography (1914) reverts to Dawson's early experiences in Australia and as a struggling journalist, but is unexpectedly bitter in tone and harsh in its realism. It attracted considerable contemporary speculation as to its authorship, and comparisons to the work of the late George Gissing.

With the outbreak of World War I Dawson turned his energy into the recruitment of volunteers for the front, launching the standard scheme for the London area and publishing a written guide (How to Help Lord Kitchener, 1914) as well as serving as first organising secretary of the Central Committee for National Patriotic Organisations. He then enlisted as a Temporary Lieutenant in the 11th Battalion Border Regiment. He was promoted to Captain in 1915 and commanded his company until invalided out of the trenches in France. By 1916 he was back in service as a General Staff Officer with Military Intelligence, being appointed in June of that year to start up a new subsection within MI7. MI7 (b) 1 was responsible for the supply of military propaganda to the press. His books A ‘Temporary Gentleman' in France (1916), Somme Battle Stories (1916), Back to Blighty (1917) and For France (1917) use his experiences in the trenches and as a military propagandist. According to an article published in The Telegraph (Brisbane, Queensland) in 1927, Dawson's propaganda unit included the following authors: Lord Dunsany, A. A. Milne, J. B. Morton, Patrick MacGill and F. Britten Austin. In 1918 he was promoted to Major, and transferred to set up a propaganda department for the new Royal Air Force. Dawson received an MBE and a Croix de Guerre in recognition of his war service.

== Later career and death ==
In 1919 Dawson, who continued to use his title of Major, was appointed Director of Information to the Government of Bombay (the former Bombay Presidency), but he was forced to retire in 1921 due to ill health and return to England, settling in Sussex. In mid-1921, Dawson wrote a short article about Mahatma Gandhi in which he presented a less than flattering profile. Dawson acknowledged that Gandhi was a popular figure whose influence on the Indian population might be compared to the popular Christian evangelists D. L. Moody and Ira Sankey or even to the actor Charlie Chaplin. However, Dawson did not equate Gandhi's popularity with him being a great intellectual: "He quite certainly is not possessed of a first-rate brain. Derivative, imitative, impressionable, emotional and dominated by a theatrical kind of egoism which verges closely upon megalomania, Mr Gandhi may not untruly be described as an intellectually strong man ... Mr Gandhi is in no single sense of the word a great man. But he has a great following, in a country where the prestige of a name sways millions; and allowance being made for his tendency toward megalomania, he is quite well-meaning." In light of Dawson's views on the unity of the British Empire, the tone of the article suggests that Dawson was not impressed by Gandhi's emerging role as an agitator for India's independence.

During the 1920s Dawson continued to write novels including Peter of Monkslease, His Mortal Tenement and The Emergence of Marie, as well as the centenary celebration book about the Royal National Lifeboat Institution Britain's Life-Boats. It was during the 1920s and 1930s that his interest in dog-breeding, as well as his participation as both a judge and competitive entrant in dog-shows, is very apparent. He may be glimpsed on film in 1933 in two surviving items from his series 'Our Dogs' in the Pathé News archive, where he is described as Kennel Expert to the Daily Herald.

He lived at 3 Maze Hill Mansions for many years and shared that residence with Ethel Gambrill. Dawson served with the Sussex Home Guard during World War II and eventually died at his home in St Leonards-on-Sea on 3 February 1951.

== Published works ==
- [as Howard Kerr] Leeway (1896) novel
- God’s Foundling (1897), novel
- Mere Sentiment (1897), short stories
- Middle Greyness (1897) novel
- In the Bight of Benin (1897), short stories
- Bismillah (1898), novel
- Daniel Whyte, An Unfinished Biography, (1899), novel
- The Story of Ronald Kestrel (1900), novel
- African Nights Entertainments (1900), short stories
- Joseph Khassan, Half-Caste (1901), novel
- Hidden Manna (1902), novel
- Things seen in Morocco (1904), travel, political analysis and short stories
- The Fortunes of Farthings (1905), historical novel
- The Genteel A.B., (1907), novel
- The Message (1907), novel
- Finn the Wolfhound (1908), novel
- Across Canada (1908), travel
- The Land of His Fathers (1910), novel
- [published anonymously] The Record of Nicholas Freydon: an autobiography (1914), novel
- How to Help Lord Kitchener (1914), volunteer recruitment advice
- Jan, A Dog and a Romance (1915, USA), novel. A sequel to Finn the Wolfhound, published as Jan, Son of Finn in the UK in 1917
- Somme Battle Stories (1916)
- A ‘Temporary Gentleman’ in France: home letters from an officer in the New Army (1917), ‘edited’ ( or rather, from internal evidence, written) by Dawson
- Back to Blighty: Battle Stories (1917)
- For France: ‘C’est pour la France’, some English Impressions of the French front (1917)
- Everybody’s Dog Book (1922, and later editions), advice and stories
- Britain’s Life-Boats (1923), commemorating the RNLI centenary, with a foreword by Dawson's friend Joseph Conrad
- Peter of Monkslease (1924), the story of a Bloodhound
- His Mortal Tenement (1924), novel
- The Emergence of Marie (1926), novel
- Letters to Young Dog Owners (1927)
- The Case Books of X 37 (1930), short stories
- Things Every Dog Owner Should Know (1932)
