= Alec Birtwell =

English cricketer

Personal information
- Full name: Alexander Joseph Birtwell
- Born: 17 December 1908; Burnley, Lancashire, England
- Died: 20 November 1974 (aged 65); Nelson, Lancashire, England
- Batting: Right-handed
- Bowling: Leg-break
- Role: Bowler

Domestic team information
- Years: Team
- 1937–1939: Lancashire

Career statistics
Competition	First-class
Matches	14
Runs scored	103
Batting average	10.30
100s/50s	0/0
Top score	31
Balls bowled	1,888
Wickets	25
Bowling average	29.96
5 wickets in innings	0
10 wickets in match	0
Best bowling	4/78
Catches/stumpings	12/0
- Source: CricketArchive, 21 May 2012

Alexander Joseph Birtwell (17 December 1908 – 20 November 1974) was an English cricketer. A leg-break spin bowler and tail-end right-handed batsman, Birtwell made fourteen appearances for Lancashire between 1937 and 1939.

== Career ==
Born in Burnley, Lancashire in 1908, Birtwell took to cricket in the Lancashire League playing for Burnley and later Nelson in the Worsley Cup from 1930 – though he was hit for fifteen runs in his only over on his debut Lancashire League match. He featured in Buckinghamshire's Minor Counties Championship team from 1934 to 1936, taking five wickets in his debut match against Hertfordshire on 11 August His achievements won him a place in the Lancashire Second XI.

He made his debut in the County Championship on 14 July 1937, facing Worcestershire at Aigburth. In a match truncated by rain, Lancashire reached 384 all out with Birtwell contributing four runs. He caught Peter Jackson off the bowling of Eddie Phillipson, and sent down seventeen wicketless overs for thirty-nine runs. Birtwell played eleven more County Championship matches that season, hitting 102 runs at 10.20 including a career best 31 as a night watchman against Kent on 11 August He took 24 wickets at 36.62, though he had to wait for his first, Alfred Croom, until his third match. His best bowling effort, 4/78, came against Essex on 25 August.

He played only one further County Championship match, on 13 May 1939 against Somerset. In a drawn game, he went wicketless with his bowling and scored a single run. During the Second World War, Birtwell served in the Royal Navy, and made appearances for their cricket team between 1943 and 1944. He was selected as part of Gubby Allen's XI in 1945, but otherwise returned to Lancashire League cricket for Burnley, Nelson and Colne.
