= Alec Knight (cricketer) =

New Zealand cricketer

Personal information
- Full name: Alexander Rutherford Knight
- Born: 24 January 1899; Dunedin, New Zealand
- Died: 8 April 1986 (aged 87); Auckland, New Zealand
- Batting: Right-handed
- Bowling: Right-arm off-spin

Domestic team information
- Years: Team
- 1918/19–1943/44: Otago

Career statistics
Competition	First-class
Matches	51
Runs scored	2245
Batting average	24.13
100s/50s	1/11
Top score	152
Balls bowled	580
Wickets	11
Bowling average	34.27
5 wickets in innings	0
10 wickets in match	0
Best bowling	3/62
Catches/stumpings	34/–
- Source: ESPNcricinfo, 25 September 2023

Alexander Rutherford Knight (24 January 1899 – 8 April 1986) was a New Zealand cricketer who played first-class cricket for Otago between the 1918–19 and 1943–44 seasons.

Alec Knight was born in Dunedin and educated at Otago Boys' High School. He played 51 first-class matches, mostly as an opening batsman. He scored 56 and 152 ― his only first-class century ― for Otago against Canterbury in 1940–41, his 50th and second-last first-class match. When Otago played the touring English team in 1929–30 he top-scored in each innings with 44 and 51. His highest score in the Plunket Shield was 83 after Otago trailed by 333 runs on the first innings against Wellington in 1927–28.

Professionally Knight was a civil servant. He died in Auckland in 1986, aged 87. An obituary was published in the New Zealand Cricket Almanack.
