= Alexander Cunningham Robertson =

General Alexander Cunningham Robertson CB FRSE (1816–1884) was a 19th British general and amateur poet.

== Life ==
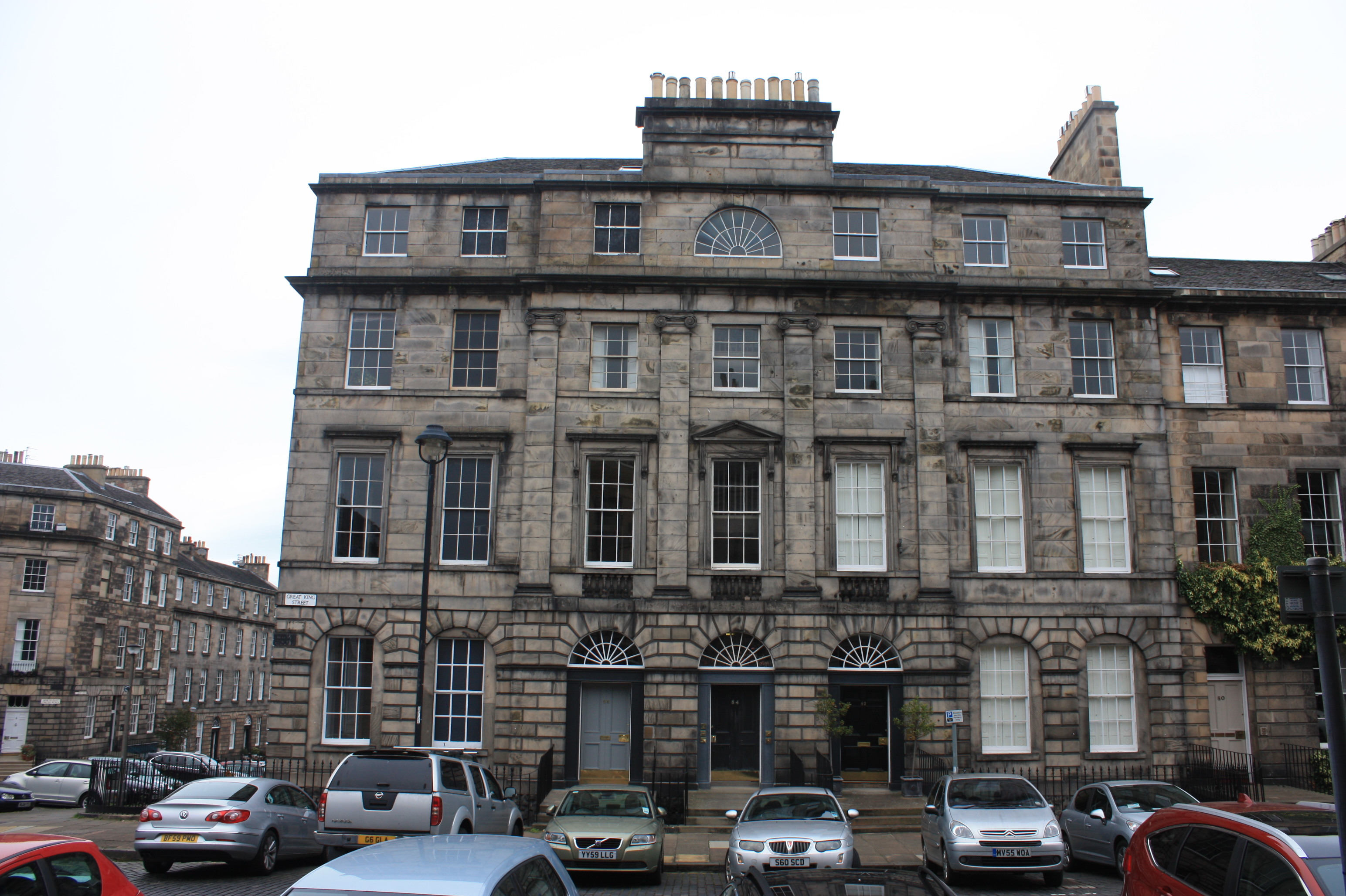
86 Great King Street (left door)

He was born in Edinburgh on 8 February 1816 the son of Major David Robertson, of the Royal Marines living at Albanty Row. He was educated at the High School in Edinburgh.

Training as a soldier he first joined the British Auxiliary Legion in Spain in 1834. In 1837 he moved as an Ensign to the British Army in the 34th Regiment. In the 1840s he was serving in Canada and appears to have kept a diary. He was promoted to Captain of the 34th Foot Regiment in 1846. In 1846 he transferred to the 8th Regiment rising to Lt Colonel by 1865 and then rosing to the rank of General.

He retired to Edinburgh living at 86 Great King Street in the Second New town.

In 1879 he was elected a Fellow of the Royal Society of Edinburgh. His proposers were David Stevenson, Charles Piazzi Smyth, William Robertson and John Muir.

He died in Liverpool on 2 December 1884.

== Family ==
In 1853 he married Mary Anne Jean Manson in London.

== Publications ==
- The Jerusalem Delivered of Torquato Tasso (1853)
