= Alec Riddolls =

New Zealand cricketer

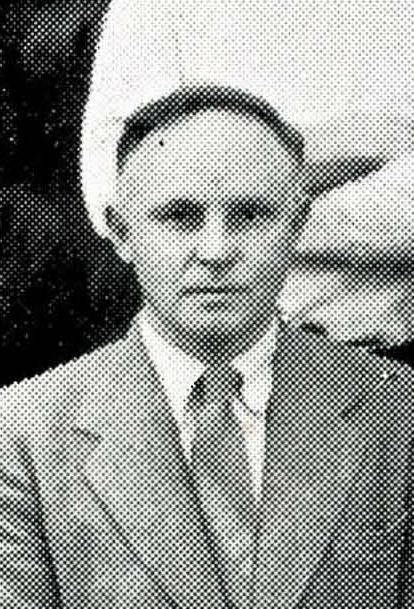
- Riddolls pictured in 1953

Personal information
- Full name: Alec Wilson Riddolls
- Born: 26 October 1908; Colne, Lancashire, England
- Died: 18 May 1963 (aged 54); Christchurch, New Zealand

Domestic team information
- Years: Team
- 1941/42: Wellington
- Source: Cricinfo, 27 October 2020

Alec Wilson Riddolls (26 October 1908 – 18 May 1963) was a New Zealand academic and sportsman. An agricultural engineer who worked at a number of university colleges in New Zealand, he played in one first-class cricket match for Wellington during the 1941–42 season and represented the province in association football.

Born at Colne near Burnley in Lancashire, Wilson's family migrated to Christchurch when he was about 12. He was educated at Christchurch Technical College in the city before attending Seddon Memorial Technical College in Auckland where he won a number of scholarships. He went up to Canterbury University College, graduating with an engineering degree in 1929, before going on to Victoria University College to complete a science degree. After working in the engineering industry, in 1934 he took up a teaching post at Hutt Valley Memorial Technical College, eventually becoming the head of the engineering department.

In 1944, Riddolls moved back to Christchurch where he was appointed at Lincoln College as the college's first lecturer in agricultural engineering. He published academic papers and a text book and was a member of a number of academic associations. He developed the teaching and research programmes at Lincoln College, established a research station to test agricultural machinery, and remained a reader at the college until his death.

In his youth, Riddolls was a prominent sportsman. He played cricket, association football, and was active in long-distance running. He represented Wellington in soccer and made one appearance for the provincial cricket team. During the match, a February 1942 fixture against Auckland at Eden Park, he scored 30 runs, including 23 in his second innings, and took a single wicket.

Married with three children, Riddolls died suddenly at Christchurch in May 1963. He was aged 54. A memorial fund at Lincoln College was established in his honour the following year.
