= Aleks (given name) =

Aleks is a given name and alternative form of Alec or Alex. Notable people with the name include:

- Aleks (footballer) (born 1991), Brazilian football goalkeeper
- Aleks Borimirov (born 1998), Bulgarian football winger
- Aleks Buda (1910–1993), Albanian historian
- Aleks Çaçi (1916–1989), Albanian author
- Aleks Danko (born 1950), Australian sculptor
- Aleks Josh (born 1995), English singer and songwriter
- Aleks Krotoski (born 1974), American journalist and broadcaster
- Aleks Le (born 1999), Vietnamese-American voice actor
- Aleks Ławniczak (born 1999), Polish football defender
- Aleks Lukanov (born 2002), Bulgarian football midfielder
- Aleks Marić (born 1984), Australian basketball player
- Aleks Matsukatov (born 1999), Russian football midfielder
- Aleks Paunovic (born 1969), Canadian actor
- Aleks Pihler (born 1994), Slovenian footballer
- Aleks Pluskowski, English archeologist
- Aleks Sierz, British theatre critic
- Aleks Syntek (born 1969), Mexican singer and songwriter
- Aleks Tarn (born 1955), Russian journalist and writer
- Aleks Vanderpool-Wallace (born 1988), Bahamian football midfielder
- Aleks Vrteski (born 1988), Macedonian football goalkeeper

== See also ==
- Aleks (disambiguation)
- Alex
- Alec
- Alek
- Aleksa
