= Vanderpool =

Vanderpool is a surname. Notable people with the surname include:

- Alex Vanderpool, Bahamian footballer
- Arianna Vanderpool-Wallace (born 1990), Bahamian swimmer
- Clare Vanderpool (born 1965), American writer
- Daniel Vanderpool (1891–1988), American Nazarene minister
- Daven "Prestige" Vanderpool, American musician and record producer
- Fitz Vanderpool (born 1967), Canadian boxer
- Jennifer Vanderpool American artist
- Syd Vanderpool (born 1972), Canadian boxer, brother of Fitz
- Vincent Vanderpool Wallace, Bahamian footballer
- Lindsay Vanderpool (born 1996), American radio host of the program Millennium Stone Circle on Newtown Radio.

== See also ==
- Vanderpool, codename for x86 virtualization
- Vander Pool, American Thoroughbred racehorse
- Vanderpool, Texas, unincorporated community in the United States
- Vanderpool Farm Complex, historic house in Albany County, New York, United States
