= Aleks =

Aleks may refer to:

- Aleks (given name)
- ALEKS, online tutoring and assessment program
- Aleks (footballer) (born 1991), Brazilian football goalkeeper
- Aviatik Alliance Aleks-251, a light aeroplane from Russia

== See also ==
- Alex (disambiguation)
- Alexander (disambiguation)
- Aleksa (disambiguation)
- Alek (disambiguation)
