= Aleksić =

- Pronunciation: pronounced [ǎleksit͡ɕ]
- Language: Serbo-Croatian

Origin
- Meaning: patronymic of Aleksa

Aleksić (Serbo-Croatian Cyrillic: Алексић) is a Serbo-Croatian surname, a patronymic derived from Aleksa. Notable people with the surname include:

- Adam Aleksic (born 2001), American linguist and content creator
- Danijel Aleksić (born 1991), Serbian football player
- Milan Aleksić (born 1986), Serbian water polo player
- Milija Aleksic (1951–2012), former English football player
- Mija Aleksić (1923–1995), Serbian actor
- Miša Aleksić (1953–2020), Serbian musician
- Petar Aleksic (born 1968), Bosnian basketball coach
- Seka Aleksić (born 1981), Serbian singer
- Slavko Aleksić (1956–2025), Bosnian Serb Chetnik commander
- Srđan Aleksić (1966–1993), Bosnian Serb war-time hero
