= Aleksa =

Aleksa may refer to:

- Aleksa (given name)
- Aleksa (surname)
- Belarusian spelling of name Oleksa
