= Agnieszka Kotlarska =

Agnieszka Kotlarska may refer to:

- Agnieszka Kotlarska (model) (1972–1996), the first Polish winner of the Miss International beauty pageant
- Agnieszka Kotlarska (actress) (1971–2015), Polish film and stage actress
