= Sts. Peter and Paul Church (Pabianice) =

- Kościół św. Piotra i św. Pawła w Pabianicach
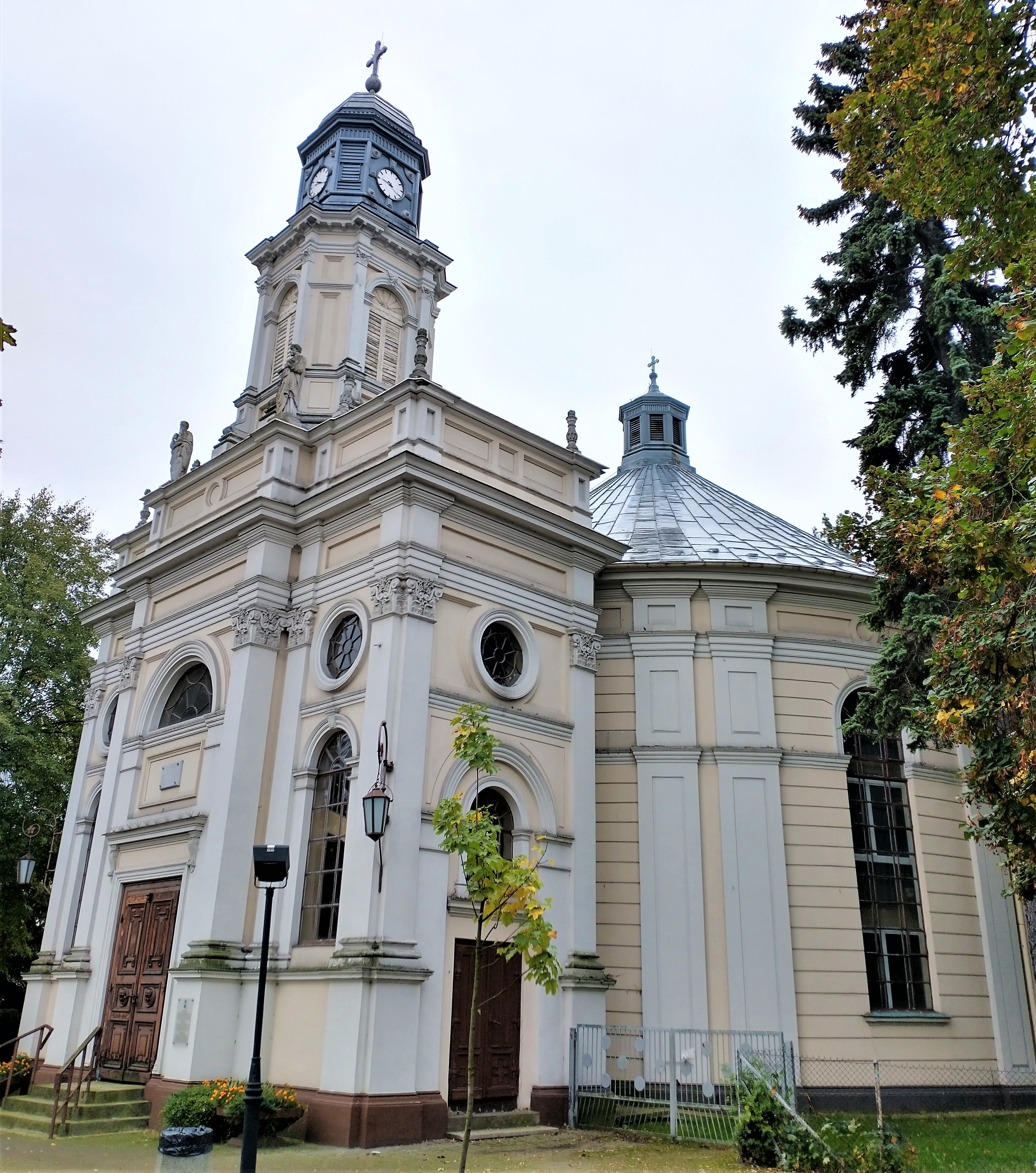
- Sts. Peter and Paul Church
- 51°39′50.20″N 19°21′19.50″E
- Location: Pabianice
- Country: Poland
- Denomination: Lutheran

History
- Consecrated: 25 November 1832

Architecture
- Architect: Franciszek Reinstein
- Style: Neoclassicism, Neo-Renaissance
- Years built: 1827-1830

Administration
- Diocese: Lutheran Diocese of Warsaw

The Sts. Peter and Paul Church is a Lutheran church and a historical landmark in the town of Pabianice in central Poland. Constructed in the early nineteenth century to cater to the spiritual needs of the growing Protestant population of the rising industrial town, the church now serves a small Lutheran community in what is a predominantly Catholic area. Since 2010 the church has been the seat of the bishop of the Lutheran Diocese of Warsaw.

== History ==
The Lutheran parish in Pabianice was established in 1818, but religious services had been held in the town since 1803 in a chapel of the sixteenth-century fortified manor. The growing number of Protestant settlers in the 1820s created the need to erect a new church for the community. The government of Congress Poland approved the project in 1821, and while preliminary work ended in 1827, problems with foundations in the marshy ground necessitated further works before the church could be consecrated in 1832. The final blueprints were those of Franciszek Reinstein with emendations by Jan Zille. The church was then rebuilt between 1875 and 1876, one of the main motives for this being expansion. The building could then accommodate 1000 people, but by 1904 the population of the parish reached twelve thousand (fourth largest in Russian Poland), which made it necessary to hold both morning and evening services. In 1945 the church was plundered and remained a property of the Communist state until 1948, when it was returned to the local Lutherans.

The Church of St. Peter and St. Paul became a listed building in 1948 and figures as an immovable heritage object in the Polish heritage register (no. 64-IV-12 from 23 March 1948 and A/45 from 29 August 1967).

== Architecture ==
The building has a round shape with an adjoining tower facing the street. The church was constructed in the Neoclassical style, although it acquired some elements of Neo-Renaissance architecture after its reconstruction in the 1870s. That was also when the building gained its contemporary appearance, with the figures of the apostles Paul and Peter on the tower and the hexagonal spire at the top of the roof of the central rotunda.

Notable elements of the interior include a marble baptismal font from 1864 and a painting of Christ by the nineteenth-century Polish painter Wojciech Gerson.

== See also ==
- Evangelical Church of the Augsburg Confession in Poland
- Lutheran Diocese of Warsaw

== Bibliography ==
- Klimek, Anna (2012). "Aktywność społeczna oraz relikty dziedzictwa materialnego ewangelików augsburskich w Pabianicach". Studia z Geografii Politycznej i Historycznej (in Polish) (1): 193–206.
- Kruś, Anna (2016). "Społeczno-religijna rola luteranów w dziejach Pabianic i Zgierza oraz relikty ich dziedzictwa materialnego". Acta Universitatis Lodziensis: Studia Geographica Socio-Oeconomica (in Polish). 25: 155–73. doi:10.18778/1508-1117.25.08.
