= Aleks Pluskowski =

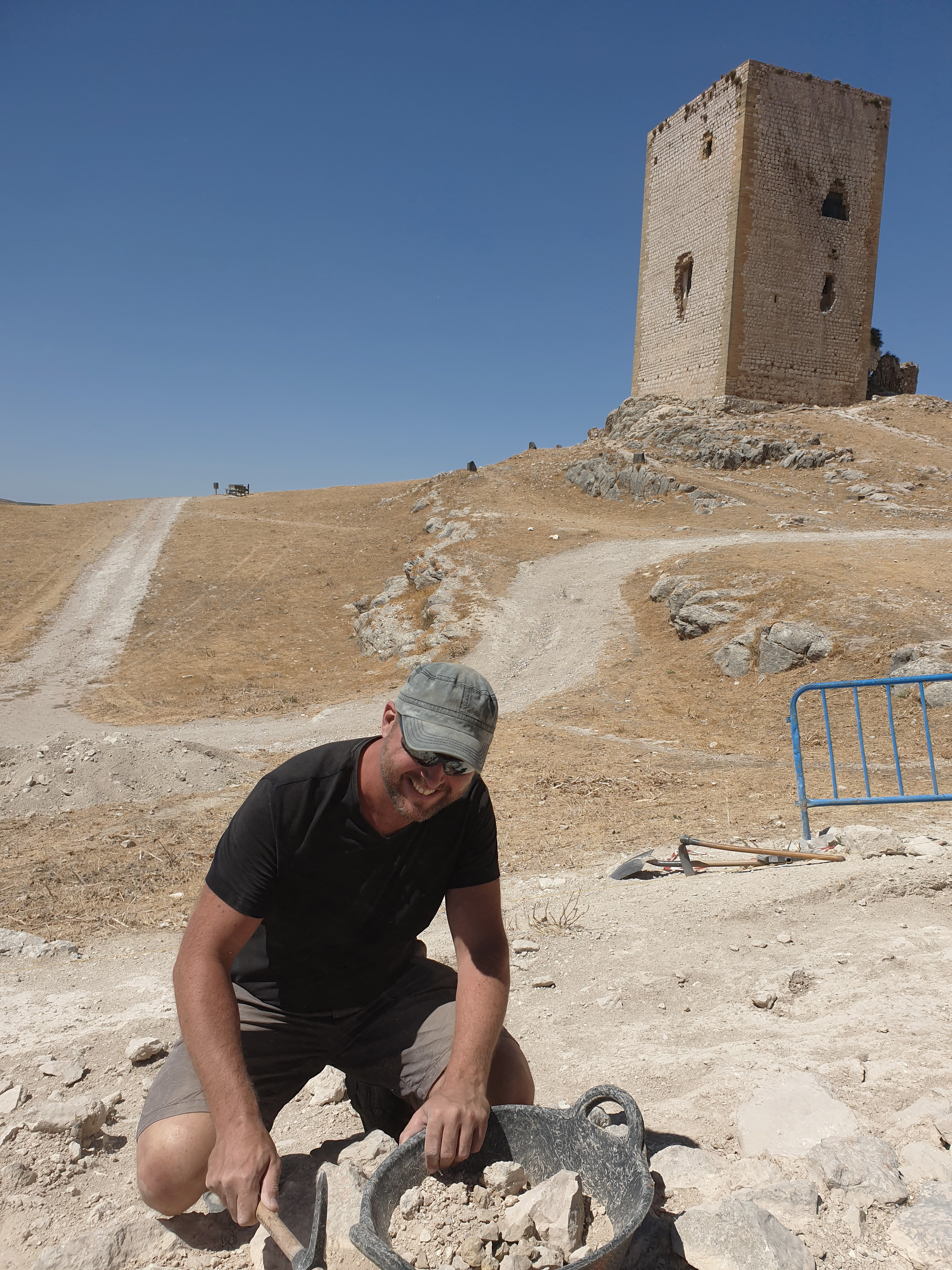

Aleks Pluskowski is Professor of Medieval Archaeology at the University of Reading, a Fellow of the Society of Antiquaries (FSA) and the Higher Education Academy (FHEA), a Committee Member of the Medieval European Research Community (MERC), a member of the European Association of Archaeologists (EAA) and a Board Member of the Historische Kommission für ost- und westpreußische Landesforschung.

He has written and edited 10 books, published over 80 articles, regularly presents at international conferences and has given lectures in 18 countries. This has included invited talks at the universities of Oxford, Cambridge, Stanford, Columbia and Harvard, as well as the Royal Historical Society and the Vatican Museums.

At the University of Reading, he teaches undergraduate and postgraduate courses on medieval archaeology, crusading archaeology and zooarchaeology.

== Personal life ==
Pluskowski was born in London in 1977 to a family with mixed Polish-English heritage. His parents, Gregory and Irena, worked in travel and instilled in him a keen interest in history, art and archaeology, as well as a love of wildlife and wilderness.

His paternal grandparents, Józef and Irena, had been involved in the Polish Resistance against the Nazi occupation and had played active roles in the Warsaw Ghetto Uprising and the Warsaw Uprising. In 2016, the Commission for the Designation of the Righteous at Yad Vashem awarded both the status of Righteous Among the Nations. Pluskowski's maternal grandfather, Wladyslaw Włoch, had served in the 17th Greater Poland Uhlan Regiment and the Polish army in France, Egypt and Italy, and grandmother Violet Rodgers, Deputy Curator of the Castle Museum in York, had served in the Royal Observer Corps. After the War she became a curator at the Historical Museum of Kraków and was awarded the Polish Cross of Merit in recognition of her work.

Pluskowski lived in Cambridge for nine years before moving back to London. He lives in Kilburn with his partner Melissa and their cat Jack.

== Education ==
Pluskowski's first experience of an archaeological excavation was in 1995 at Compton Bassett in Wiltshire, part of an early medieval landscape archaeology project led by Professor Andrew Reynolds of UCL. He went on to study Archaeology & Anthropology at Christ's College, University of Cambridge, graduating with a Bachelor of Arts (BA hons) in 1999 having attained a First. As a student he participated in excavations at Over (Cambridgeshire), Prague and Kraków. After a short stint of working for the Cambridge Archaeological Unit, he began doctoral studies at Gonville & Caius College in Cambridge, investigating responses to wolves and their environments in medieval north-western Europe on either side of the conversion to Christianity. He was awarded his Doctor of Philosophy in 2003, and his thesis was published by Boyell in 2006 as Wolves and the Wilderness in the Middle Ages.

== Research ==
=== Animals ===
In 2003 Pluskowski obtained a Junior Research Fellowship (JRF) at Clare College, Cambridge, where he developed research on animals as material culture in medieval Europe. He became particularly interested in how animal identities were transformed and ritualised. At this time he began working with Professor Sauro Gelichi of Ca'Foscari University of Venice, Dr Krish Seetah (then also at Cambridge) and Dr Silvia Garavello (Ca'Foscari), recording animal bone assemblages from archaeological sites in the Veneto and Montenegro connected with the historical expansion of Venice. He was also involved with the Medieval Animal Data Network (MAD) at the Central European University in Budapest, where he became a regular visitor for conferences, workshops and seminars. He created the 'Animals as Material Culture' conference series with the first event taking place in Cambridge in 2005. This was published by Oxbow in 2007 as Breaking and Shaping Beastly Bodies: Animals as Material Culture in the Middle Ages.

Pluskowski's work on wolves also involved investigating animalised identities connected with religious transformation, and particularly those associated with werewolves in northern Europe. He remains interested in cultural responses to large carnivores more broadly, in both past and present societies.

=== Baltic Crusades ===
In 2006, Pluskowski's JRF was renewed for a further year in collaboration with the McDonald Institute for Archaeological Research. This funded new excavations at the castle in Feldioara identified with the Teutonic Order's castle of Marienburg (Transylvania, Romania) in collaboration with Dr Adrian Ioniţă of the Vasile Pârvan Archaeological Institute in Bucharest. Their aim was to develop an ecological profile of the castle community. It also enabled him to fund a pilot project collaborating with Malbork Castle Museum recording faunal assemblages from Dr Maria Dąbrowska's excavations. He went on to develop collaborations with Gundars Kalniņš of Cēsis Castle Museum in Latvia and with Professor Heiki Valk of the University of Tartu in Estonia. In 2007, he obtained a lectureship at the Department of Archaeology, University of Reading, and began involving colleagues in a broader study of the environmental impact of the Baltic Crusades, supported by a grant from the British Academy.

In 2010, he was awarded a Starter Grant by the European Research Council (ERC) for the 'Ecology of Crusading' project, which investigated the environmental impact of conquest, migration and religious conversion associated with the Baltic Crusades in north Poland, Latvia, Estonia and western Lithuania. This saw Pluskowski managing a bigger team of archaeologists, palaeoenvironmental specialists and historians, alongside collaborations with partners in universities and museums across the Baltic Sea region. The results were published as a series of articles and two books by Brepols. During these years Pluskowski collaborated with photographer Magnus Elander on images for publications relating to the Baltic Crusades. He subsequently worked on a project investigating ritual horse deposits in pre-Christian Balt cemeteries led by Dr Katherine French.

In 2013, Pluskowski published the first comprehensive book on the archaeology of the Prussian Crusade with Routledge, with a second edition in 2022. He also published an introductory book on the Teutonic Order with Reaktion as part of their Medieval Lives series in 2024, and a broader history of the Baltic Crusades with Yale University Press in 2026. He has written more widely on environmental and landscape approaches to crusading frontiers, related sacred landscapes, and the archaeology of the medieval military orders.

=== Medieval Iberia and Occitania ===
In 2015, Pluskowski began a research collaboration with Professor Guillermo García-Contreras of the University of Granada investigating the cultural landscapes of the medieval frontiers of the Guadalajara province in Spain. This developed into an extensive research project supported by the UK's Arts and Humanities Research Council, as well as several Spanish institutions. The project, called 'Landscapes of (Re)Conquest: Dynamics of Multicultural Frontiers in Medieval South-West Europe' also involved a team at the University of York led by Professor Michelle Alexander and a collaboration with Professor Helena Kirchner and her team at the Autonomous University of Barcelona.

The project included an investigation of the Pyrenean frontier between France and Aragon, created following the Albigensian Crusade and the annexation of Occitania. This involved a collaboration with a French team led by Dr Carole Puig and Professor Jean-Michel Carozza., and included the first study of a faunal assemblage from Jean-Paul Cazes's excavations of the famous Occitan village of Montaillou. The results were published in a book by Oxbow in 2025, freely available on JSTOR.

The Landscapes of (Re)Conquest project served as a springboard for the ERC synergy project 'Re-thinking the "Green Revolution" in the Medieval Western Mediterranean (6th-16th centuries)' (Medgreenrev), which is funded from 2023-2029. Pluskowski is leading the University of Reading team and partners at UCL and the University of Basel. The consortium also involves the Autonomous University of Barcelona and the universities of Granada, York, Valencia and Murcia. The project is investigating the environmental impact of conquest, population movements and cultural transformation in Peninsular Spain, the Balearic Islands and Morocco during the 'medieval millennium'.

=== Mauritian Archaeology and Cultural Heritage ===
In 2010, Pluskowski was invited to join the 'Mauritian Archaeology and Cultural Heritage' project (MACH) by Dr Krish Seetah and contribute to the development of environmental archaeology in the Mascarene Islands. Over the years he has continued to be involved in excavations and surveys in Mauritius, exploring the ecological impact of colonisation and cultural transformation in a post-medieval, colonial context.

== Editorial Work ==
During his doctoral studies at Cambridge in 2001-2002, Pluskowski served as the Editor of The Archaeological Review From Cambridge. For a brief period in 2017, and then in 2018-2021, he served as Deputy Editor of the journal Medieval Archaeology, and then as Editor in 2021-2024. He is currently on the editorial committee of the journals Crusades and Pruthenia. ·Between 2008 and 2024 he was the Editor of Brill's 'History of the Environment' series, and he has served as a reviewer and reader for numerous publishers.

== Awards ==
Pluskowski was awarded an honorary doctorate from the University of Tartu in 2020 for his services to Estonian archaeology, the Lansdowne Fellowship at the University of Victoria (Canada) in 2010, an International Visitor Fellowship at the Stanford Humanities Center and the Freeman Spogli Institute for International Studies at Stanford University (USA) in 2016, and a Visiting Professorship at the University of Toulouse (France) in 2020.

== Selected publications ==
- Pluskowski, A. (2026) Black Cross: A History of the Baltic Crusades. New Haven: Yale University Press.
- Pluskowski, A. García-Contreras, G. and Alexander, M. (eds.) (2025) Landscapes of (Re)Conquest: Frontier Dynamics in Medieval Iberia and Occitania. Oxford: Oxbow.
- Pluskowski, A. (2024) The Teutonic Knights: The Rise and Fall of a Religious Corporation. London: Reaktion.
- Pluskowski, A. G. (2012 / 2022) The Archaeology of the Prussian Crusade: Holy War and Colonisation. London: Routledge. Two editions.
- Dobrosielksa, A. Pluskowski, A. Szczepański, S. (eds.) (2020) Homini, qui in honore fuit: księga pamiątkowa poświęcona śp. profesorowi Grzegorzowi Białuńskiemu. Olsztyn: Towarzystwo Naukowe Pruthenia.
- Pluskowski, A. G. (ed.) (2019) Environment, Colonisation, and the Crusader States in Medieval Livonia and Prussia: Terra Sacra 1, Turnhout: Brepols.
- Pluskowski, A. G. (ed.) (2019) Ecologies of Crusading, Colonization, and Religious Conversion in the Medieval Baltic: Terra Sacra 2, Turnhout: Brepols.
- Pluskowski, A. G. (ed.) (2012) The Ritual Killing and Burial of Animals: European Perspectives. Oxford: Oxbow.
- Pluskowski, A. G. (ed.) (2007) Breaking and Shaping Beastly Bodies: Animals as Material Culture in the Middle Ages, Oxford, Oxbow.
- Pluskowski, A. G. (2006) Wolves and Wilderness in the Middle Ages, Woodbridge, Boydell.
