= A Doll's House (1973 Losey film) =

1973 film by Joseph Losey

- VHS cover
- Directed by: Joseph Losey
- Written by: David Mercer
- Based on: A Doll's House (1879 play) by Henrik Ibsen
- Produced by: Joseph Losey
- Starring: Jane Fonda; David Warner; Trevor Howard; Delphine Seyrig; Edward Fox
- Cinematography: Gerry Fisher
- Edited by: Reginald Beck
- Music by: Michel Legrand
- Production company: World Film Services; Les Films de la Boétie
- Distributed by: British Lion (UK); Cinema International Corporation (France)
- Release date: 17 May 1973 (France)
- Running time: 106 minutes
- Countries: United Kingdom; France
- Language: English
- Budget: $900,000
- Box office: $787,740

A Doll's House is a 1973 period drama film directed and produced by Joseph Losey, adapted by David Mercer from the 1879 play by Henrik Ibsen. It stars Jane Fonda in the role of Nora Helmer and David Warner as her domineering husband, Torvald. The cast also features Trevor Howard, Delphine Seyrig, and Edward Fox.

A co-production between the United Kingdom and France, the film was shot on-location in Røros, Norway. Losey's version of the play was extensively adapted for film. From Ibsen's expository dialogue, entire new scenes were developed by British dramatist Mercer and integrated through a number of invented sets.

The film premiered on May 17, 1973, and received mixed reviews. It was one of two English-language versions of Ibsen's play released in 1973, a phenomenon known as twin films. In the United States, it bypassed theatrical distribution and instead aired on ABC as a movie of the week.

== Plot ==
The film focuses on the married life of banker Torvald Helmer and his wife Nora. A young middle-class couple with three small children, their seemingly respectable marriage is revealed to be a broken and bloodless matter.

The Helmers live in an unequal partnership, dominated by Torvald. Although he professes to love her, Torvald constantly chides Nora for what he calls her careless and childlike nature; he often calls her his "doll". He proudly thinks of himself as the family's breadwinner and protector, but he remains unaware of the secret that Nora holds: She had saved him when he had become seriously ill and very nearly destitute. Without his knowledge, she had borrowed a large sum of money so that he could temporarily retire and recuperate. She told him the money had been inherited from her family; in truth it had been a private loan from Nils Krogstad, one of Torvald's coworkers. Nora has been scrupulously repaying him in small installments skimmed from her household allowance.

Torvald, it turns out, already holds the boorish Krogstad in contempt for various reasons. When Torvald is appointed bank director, one of his acts is to fire his unlikable coworker. The desperate Krogstad attempts to blackmail Nora – she must persuade Torvald to keep him on the job, or he will tell all about the secret loan. Its existence would be embarrassment enough for Nora, but Krogstad threatens to reveal the most shocking news of all: Nora had forged her father's signature as a co-signer on the contract.

The story includes important subplots regarding the unexpected tenderness of Krogstad (toward Nora's friend Kristine, his old flame) and the quixotic love interest (toward Nora) of the elderly Dr. Rank. However, the essential conflict comes when Torvald gets a letter from Krogstad describing the loan. Indignantly, Torvald pours scorn on his wife for her morals, intellect, and financial sense; he cuts short her explanations and declares that she will be allowed no hand in raising their children. His fury seems infinite until suddenly a second letter from Krogstad arrives. It contains Nora's contract, complete with forged signature and surrendered without explanation. Torvald holds the incriminating evidence in his hand, utterly relieved, and begins to make weak apologies for his outburst. In the meantime, Nora has had a transformational realization about her love and marriage. She stands up to Torvald, explains her new vision, and then – against all customs of the day – walks out on him forever.

== Cast ==
- Jane Fonda as Nora Helmer
- David Warner as Torvald Helmer
- Trevor Howard as Dr. Rank
- Delphine Seyrig as Kristine Linde
- Edward Fox as Nils Krogstad
- Ingrid Natrud as Helene, the maid
- Pierre Oudry as Olssen, the porter
- Anna Wing as Anne-Marie, the nanny
- Morten Floor as Bob Helmer
- Tone Floor as Emmy Helmer
- Frode Lien as Ivar Helmer

== Production ==
=== Filming ===
Filming took place in the Norwegian town of Røros, where local residents served as extras for the exterior scenes.

The cinematographer was Gerry Fisher, who had a long professional relationship with Losey beginning in the mid-1960s during the director's British period, including Accident (1967), The Go-Between (1971), and Don Giovanni (1979).

=== Music ===
French composer Michel Legrand provided the musical soundtrack, a "bright, horn-dominated neoclassical score".

=== Cast and director conflict ===
Fonda's feminist sensibilities informed her performance and her relationship with Losey. The director, who had a history of stormy relationships with his leading ladies, earned the ire of both Fonda and Delphine Seyrig before the film was released.

In a letter from June 1973, Fonda assailed Losey for making "anti-feminist remarks to the press" and charging that "your [Losey's] inability to deal with, to countenance, strong women...has done irreparable harm to the film". On a personal note, she added: "I was never able to penetrate your paranoia or snobbery while we were working together". Losey, for his part, grumbled that Fonda had "little sense of humor" and "was spending most of her time working on her political speeches instead of learning her lines".

Critics James Palmer and Michael Riley caution that “Losey’s interest in woman’s experience and issues is no guarantee of a depth or breadth of understanding.” To the extent that Losey’s A Doll’s House provides positive feminist themes, these are derived exclusively from Ibsen's stage play.

== Comparison to source material ==
Ibsen's three-act play was adapted to a screenplay by Losey in collaboration with British dramatist David Mercer. The original text takes place in a single room in a single day, but the Mercer/Losey version is expanded. Much of the expository dialogue of Act I is converted into an extensive prologue. Events that are only discussed by the actors in the Ibsen play – such as the early friendship of Nora and Kristine, the romance and breakup of Kristine and Krogstad, the life-threatening illness of Torvald, and the death of Nora's father – are all fleshed out in full separate scenes at the start of the film.

The one-room setting of Ibsen's original is a deliberate device suggestive of Nora's isolation and her imprisonment within her marriage. In the film, however, multiple locations outside the Helmer house are used for visual explication, lending dramatic emphasis to plot points. Even within the house, the camera moves from room to room, revealing the physical comforts of their home and its confining nature – its "deadly insularity". The combined effect of Losey's alterations have been praised by some critics for giving the work a cinematic quality and making it "a film rather than a photographed play".

Losey intended his added scenes to achieve artistic merit in their own right. Critic Colin Gardner has commented on one example at the start of the film: "just as we see Nora and Kristine skidding excitedly across the surface of the pond, we also spot a static, black-coated figure lurking ominously outside the teahouse in the exact centre of the shot (i.e. at the spatial vanishing point). This turns out to be Krogstad, steeling himself for his fateful rejection by Kristine. The sweet purity of youth is thus already tainted by the acrid taste of the social outcast – the future man of vengeance – and the source of Nora's own financial enslavement."

Other critics found Losey's bold changes to be off-putting, even blasphemous. Writing in The New York Times, Nora Sayre complained bitterly that the film had been "fattened with feeble lines and even short scenes that the old genius didn't write".

== Release ==
A Doll's House was first aired in the United States on the ABC television network on 23 December 1973. It had been shown at the 1973 New York Film Festival, and was screened at the 1973 Cannes Film Festival, but wasn't entered into the main competition. In June 1980, it was given a nine-day run at one of the Laemmle Theatres in Los Angeles.

Losey's film was one of two English-language versions of Ibsen's play released in 1973: the other version was directed by Patrick Garland and stars Claire Bloom and Anthony Hopkins. The coincidental competition for a relatively small audience meant commercial difficulties for both films.

== Critical reception ==
The choice of Fonda for the principal role has always elicited some commentary on her casting and performance. Known as a high-profile supporter of feminism, Fonda took the role at a time when the U.S. women's rights movement was at its peak. Many film critics praised Fonda's work – Leonard Maltin cited it as the main reason to see the film (which he otherwise deemed only "moderately successful"). Charles Champlin likewise praised her performance, and wrote that her contemporary persona dovetailed well with Mercer's dialogue, which "skillfully drops the stilted period rhetoric without going colloquial or slangy".

Some critics have suggested that the film suffers under the weight of Fonda's public image. Professor Neil Sinyard wrote, "Perhaps the star's own feminist associations obscure our vision of the character's blind and painful quest towards self-awareness and undermine the shock of Nora's startling decision (startling, that is, to a nineteenth century audience) to walk out on her husband and children." More bluntly, Rex Reed wrote that Fonda's "star personality" undercut her performance in an otherwise admirable production: "One never believes her as the macaroon-munching birdbrain or the charming coquette or the toy wife. In the great scene of defiance at the end, she takes the film with a tank".

== See also ==
- Twin films

== Sources ==
- Callahan, Dan. 2003. Losey, Joseph. Senses of Cinema, March 2003. Great Directors Issue 25.https://www.sensesofcinema.com/2003/great-directors/losey/#:~:text=The%20dominant%20themes%20of%20Losey's,love%20story%20in%20his%20films. Accessed 12 October, 2024.
- Hirsch, Foster. 1980. Joseph Losey. Twayne Publishers, Boston, Massachusetts. ISBN 0-8057-9257-0
- Palmer, James and Riley, Michael. 1993. The Films of Joseph Losey. Cambridge University Press, Cambridge, England. ISBN 0-521-38386-2

=== Bibliography ===
- Bleiler, David (2001). TLA Film, Video, and DVD Guide 2002–2003: The Discerning Film Lover's Guide. New York: Macmillan. ISBN 9780312282097.
- Erskine, Thomas; Welsh, James Michael; Tibbetts, John C. (2000). Video Versions: Film Adaptations of Plays on Video. Westport, CT: Greenwood Publishing Group. p. 96. ISBN 9780313301858.
- Gardner, Colin (2004). Joseph Losey. Manchester: Manchester University Press. ISBN 9780719067839.
- Maltin, Leonard (2014). Leonard Maltin's 2015 Movie Guide. New York: Penguin. ISBN 9780698183612.
- Sinyard, Neil (2013). Filming Literature: The Art of Screen Adaptation. London: Routledge. ISBN 9781134054114.
