= Patricia MacCormack =

Australian scholar

Patricia MacCormack is an Australian scholar who lives and works in London, England. Currently she is Professor of Continental Philosophy in English and Media at Anglia Ruskin University, Cambridge.

She has published extensively on philosophers including Gilles Deleuze, Felix Guattari, Maurice Blanchot, Michel Serres, Luce Irigaray, and concepts such as queer theory, teratology, body modification, posthuman theory, animal rights, horror films and antinatalism. In 2013 she was a visiting Leverhulme Fellow at the University of California, Santa Barbara.

== Books ==
- The Schizoanalysis of Cinema, edited with Ian Buchanan and including the chapter 'The Ecosophy of Film'. New York: Continuum. 2008. ISBN 978-1847061287
- Cinesexuality. Routledge. 2008. ISBN 978-0754671756
- Posthuman Ethics: Embodiment and Cultural Theory. Routledge. 2012. ISBN 978-1409434542
- The Animal Catalyst: Towards Ahuman Theory, sole edited anthology, and including the Introduction and chapter 'After Life'. Bloomsbury Academic. 2014. ISBN 978-1472526847
- Deleuze and the Animal co-edited with Colin Gardner and including the Introduction and chapter 'Ahuman Abolition'. Edinburgh University Press. 2017. ISBN 978-1474422741
- Ecosophical Aesthetics: Art, Ethics and Ecology with Guattari, co-edited with Colin Gardner and including the Introduction and chapter 'Schizo-Semiotic Apprenticeship: Guattari's Gift to Contemporary Clinical Practice'. Bloomsbury Academic. 2018. ISBN 978-1350026193
- The Ahuman Manifesto: Activism for the End of the Anthropocene. Bloomsbury Academic. 2020. ISBN 978-1350081109
