= Aleksa (given name) =

- Gender: Male

Origin
- Meaning: defender

Other names
- Related names: Aleksandr, Alexander

Aleksa (Serbian Cyrillic: Алекса) is a Serbian masculine given name derived from Greek Alexios (Αλέξιος), meaning "Defender", usually a diminutive of Aleksandar ("Alexander").

It may refer to:

- Aleksa Simić (1800–1872), Serbian politician and member of the Ustavobranioci
- Aleksa Dundić (1890s-1920), Yugoslav communist and October Revolutionary
- Aleksa Šantić (1868–1924), Serbian poet
- Aleksa Nenadović (1749–1804), Serbian ober knyaz
- Aleksa Brđović (born 1993), Serbian volleyball player
- Aleksa Šaponjić (born 1992), Serbian water polo player
- Aleksa Gajić (born 1974), Serbian comics artist and film director
- Aleksa Radovanović (1900–2004), the last of Salonika front veteran alive and president of veteran association
- Aleksa Buha (born 1939), Serbian philosopher and academic
- Aleksa or Alex Bogdanovic, (born 1984), Serbian-British tennis player
- Aleksa Milojević (born 2000), Serbian footballer
- Aleksa Rasheva (born 2010), Bulgarian rhythmic gymnast

== See also ==
- Aleksa (surname)
- Alek
