= Pabianice =

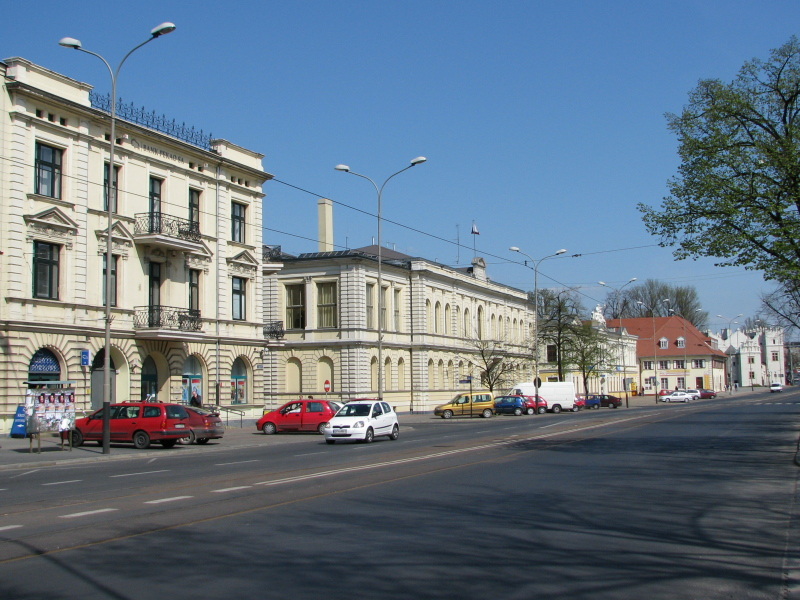
- Zamkowa Street

- Flag Coat of arms

- Location within Poland
- Coordinates: 51°39′N 19°23′E
- Country: Poland
- Voivodeship: Łódź
- County: Pabianice
- Gmina: Pabianice (urban gmina)
- Established: before 10th century
- City rights: 1297

Government
  - City mayor: Grzegorz Mackiewicz

Area
  - Total: 32.99 km^{2} (12.74 sq mi)
- Highest elevation: 203 m (666 ft)
- Lowest elevation: 174 m (571 ft)

Population (31 December 2021)
  - Total: 63,023 ▼
  - Density: 1,910/km^{2} (4,948/sq mi)
- Time zone: UTC+1 (CET)
  - Summer (DST): UTC+2 (CEST)
- Postal code: 95–200
- Area code: +48 42
- Vehicle registration: EPA
- Primary airport: Łódź Władysław Reymont Airport
- Website: http://www.um.pabianice.pl

Pabianice [pabʲaˈɲit͡sɛ] is a city in central Poland with 63,023 inhabitants (2021). Situated in the Łódź Voivodeship, it is the capital of Pabianice County. It lies about 10 kilometres (6 miles) southwest of Łódź and belongs to the metropolitan area of that city. It is the third largest city in the Łódź Voivodeship by population. The area of the city covers 32.9 square kilometres (12.7 sq mi), being the 10th largest in Łódź Voivodeship.

According to data from 2009, agricultural land constitutes 53%, of the area and forests another 9%. The city covers 6.70% of Pabianice County.

It is located in the Sieradz Land. Neighbour administrative divisions: gmina Dobroń, gmina Ksawerów, miasto Łódź, gmina Pabianice, gmina Rzgów.

== Transportation ==
Pabianice has seen major infrastructural changes over the past few years amidst increased investment and economic growth. The city has a much improved infrastructure with new roads. Pabianice now has a good circular road system. Pabianice bypass (express road S14) opened in May 2012. However, parts of S8 (part of the European route E67) are currently under construction and to be completed within 2012.

Near Pabianice there is an international airport: Łódź Władysław Reymont Airport (IATA: LCJ, ICAO: EPLL) located just 11 kilometres (7 miles) from the city centre.

Public transport in Pabianice includes buses, trams (streetcars), as of 2013 commuter railway Łódź Agglomeration Railway and regional rail PKP Polregio. The regional rail and light rail is operated by Polish State Railways (PKP). There are also some suburban bus lines run by private operators. Bus service covers the entire city. Currently, the Miejskie Przedsiębiorstwo Komunikacyjne (City Transport Company) company runs line number 41 which connects Pabianice with Łódź City.

== History ==
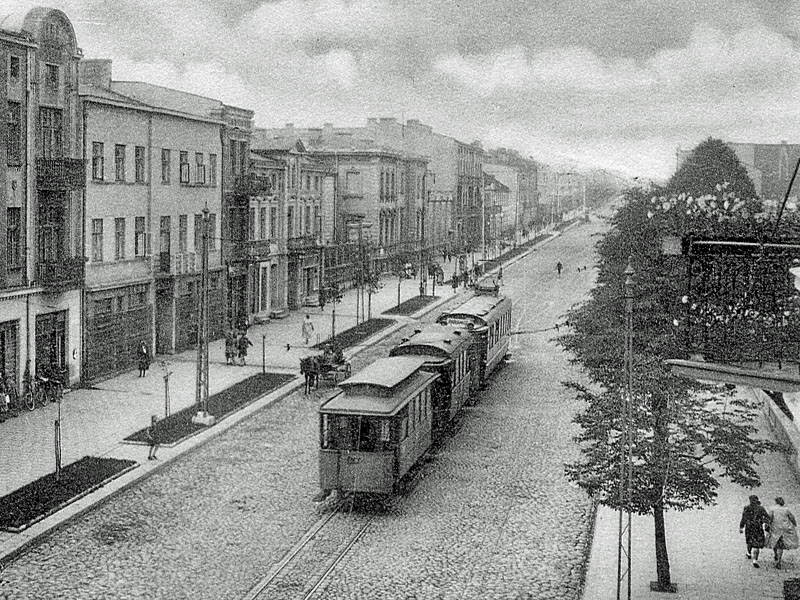
Pabianice in the interbellum

Pabianice was established in the 10th or 11th century, and was part of early Piast-ruled Poland. In 1297, Władysław I Łokietek granted town rights. Pabianice was a private church town, administratively located in the Szadek County in the Sieradz Voivodeship in the Greater Poland Province of the Kingdom of Poland. In 1555, Polish King Sigismund II Augustus issued a privilege, which established craft guilds in Pabianice.

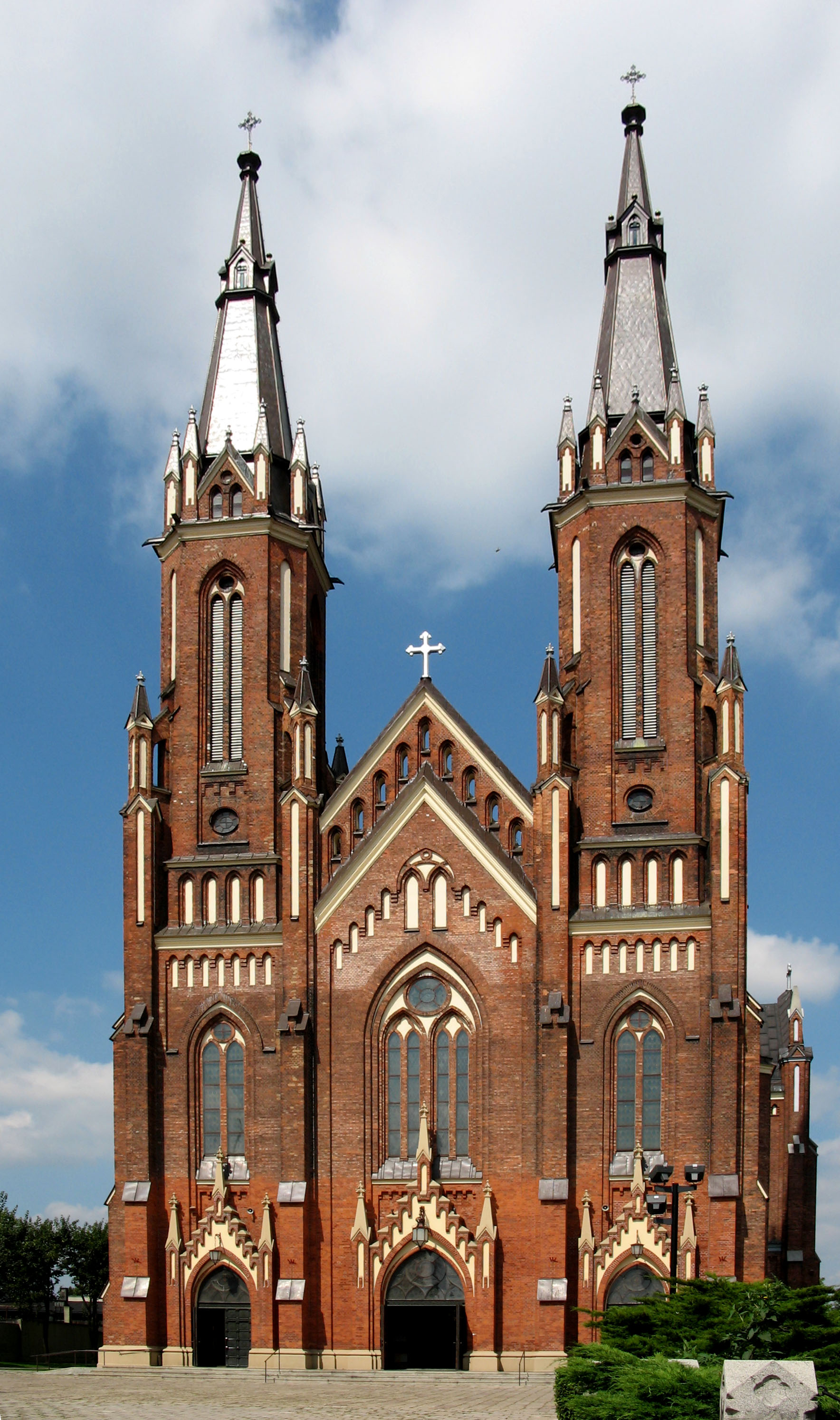
Church of Saint Mary, the town's largest church

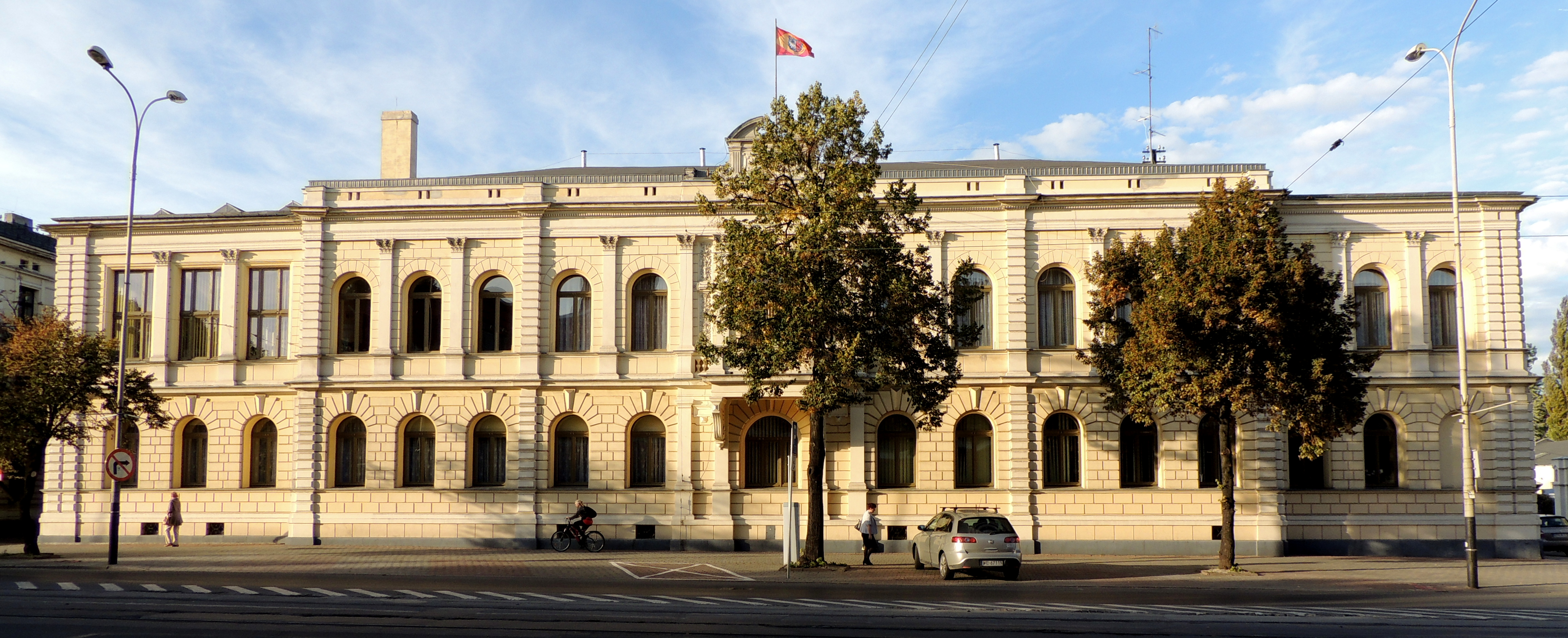
Enders' Palace

Before World War II, Pabianice had a substantial Jewish population, comprising about a quarter of all residents of the town. Jews had been living in the town since the 1700s. Following the German invasion of Poland, which started World War II in September 1939, the town was under German occupation. As part of the Intelligenzaktion, in late 1939, the Germans carried out mass arrests of local Polish intelligentsia, who were initially imprisoned in a local transit camp and the nearby Radogoszcz concentration camp, and then either deported to other concentration camps or mostly murdered in nearby forests. Local Polish teachers and activists were murdered by the Germans during large massacres in the nearby Łagiewniki forest (within today's city limits of Łódź) in November and December 1939. The Germans also expelled around 1,000 Poles from the town in December 1939. Under German occupation nearly the entire Jewish population was murdered. Some were murdered in the town, several thousand were sent to the Chełmno extermination camp where they were immediately gassed, and others were expelled to Łódź and to forced labour camps in the area. Only about 150 survived of the 9,000 Jews thought to be living in Pabianice at the start of the war. For more on the wartime experience see Megargee. The German occupation ended in 1945.

== Demography ==
Recently, the population of Pabianice has been steadily decreasing. Between 2002 and 2016 it fell from 72,444 to 66,265 (a decrease of about 400 people every year).

== Unemployment ==
According to source data from 2009 average income per capita was on the level of 1844,96 PLN. According to source data from October 2011 average unemployment rate in Pabianice is on the level of 15,6%

== Architecture ==
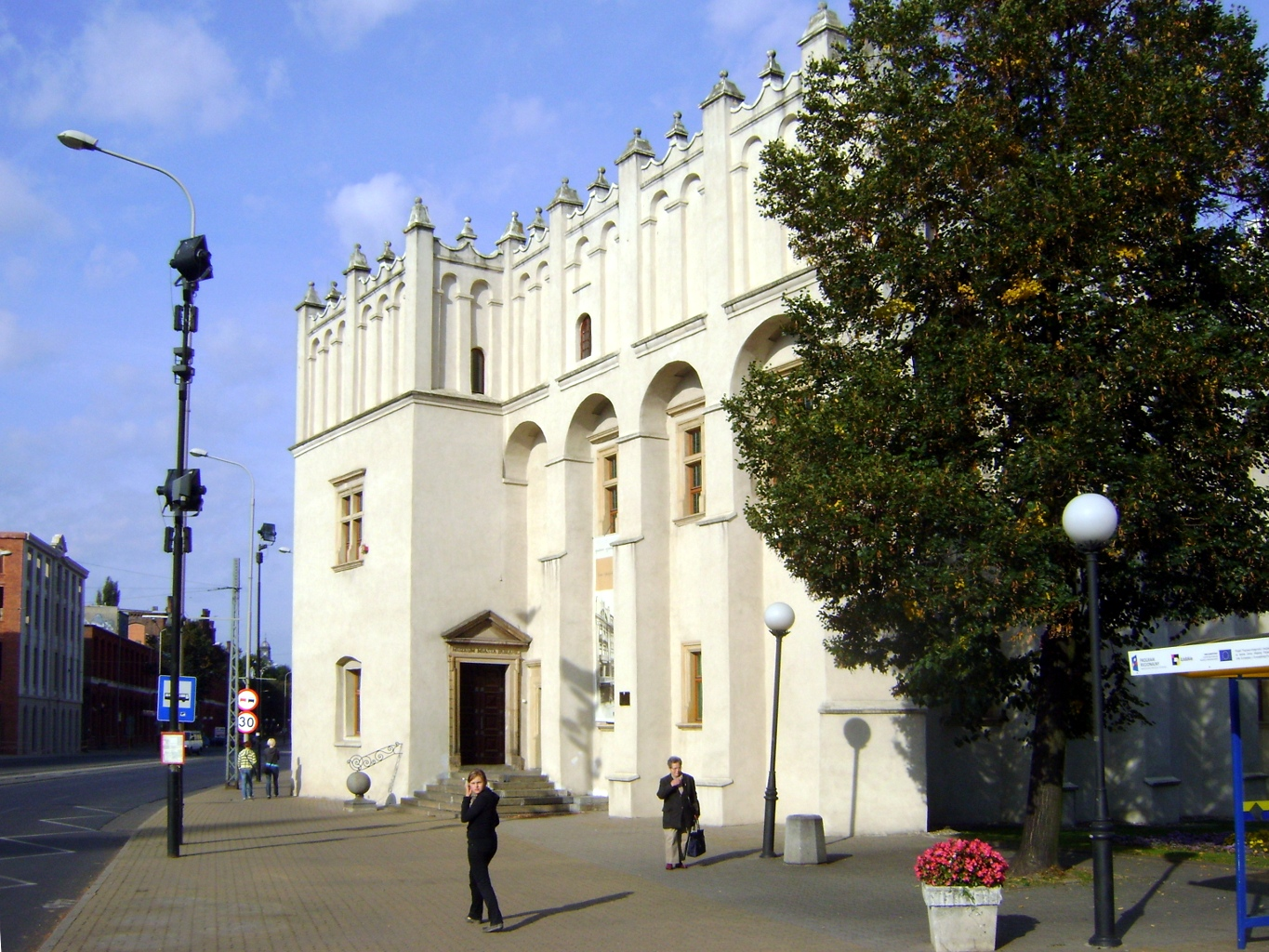
Renaissance fortified manor house

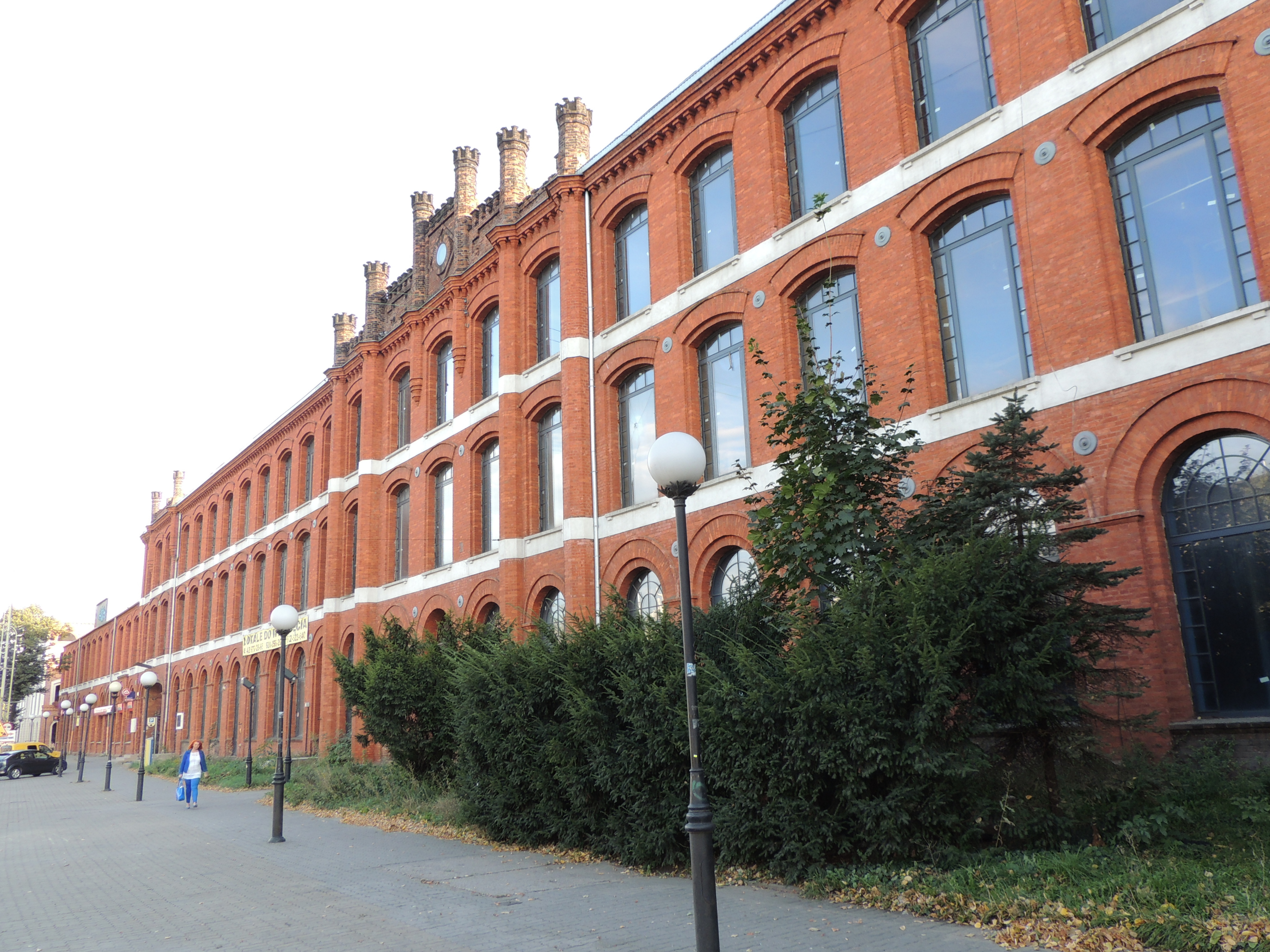
Old, monumental, Neo-Gothic weaving mill of Krusche & Ender's.

1. Church of St. Matthew the Evangelist
2. Renaissance fortified manor house of Cracovian Chapter
3. Weaver houses (Domy tkaczy)
4. "Krusche-Ender" cotton factory buildings
5. Old offices "Krusche-Ender" with "prządki" sculpture
6. Old palace of Enders' family
7. Lutheran Church of St. Peter and St. Paul
8. Neo-Gothic Church of Saint Mary
9. Railway station
10. Renaissance Revival pentecostal chapel near Ludwik Waryński St. (ruins)
11. Maria Konopnicka Special Education School Complex
12. Pabianicki Harvard Heureka Private Schools
13. Christian cemeteries
14. Jewish cemetery
15. Synagogue (destroyed)
16. Pabianice Castle

== Quarters and administrative subdivisions ==
Centrum, Bugaj, Piaski, Stare Miasto, Karniszewice, Klimkowizna, Jutrzkowice, Wola Zaradzyńska Nowa, J. Salwy, Marii Konopnickiej, Jana Pawła II, Mikołaja Kopernika, Dąbrowa, Rypułtowice, Czyryczyn (formerly Sereczyn), Karolew, Zatorze.

== Sport ==
Club	Sport	Founded	League	Venue	Head Coach
Language School Pabianice	Basketball	1946	First League	MOSiR, ul. Grota-Roweckiego 3, Pabianice	Sylwia Wlaźlak
Włókniarz Pabianice	Football	1946	Łódzka Klasa Okręgowa	MOSiR, ul. Grota-Roweckiego 3, Pabianice	Jacek Włodarczewski
PTC Pabianice	Football	1906	Łódzka Klasa Okręgowa	Stadium, ul. Stefanii Sempołowskiej 6, Pabianice	Jan Rykała

== Notable people ==
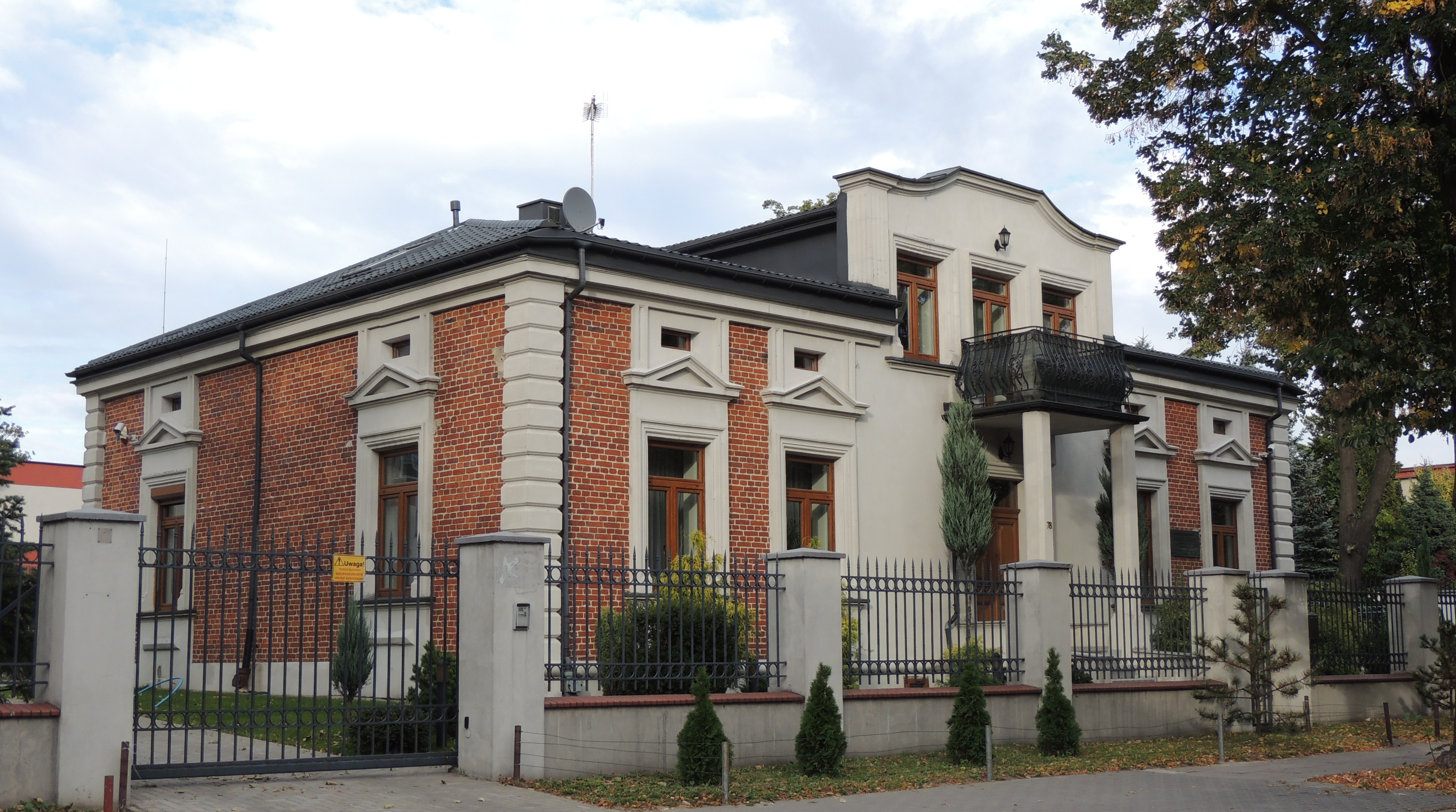
Former home and workshop of painter Bolesław Nawrocki

- St. Maximilian Kolbe (1894–1941), Polish Catholic priest
- Agnieszka Kotlarska (actress)
- Menachem Mendel Alter (1877–1942), Grand Rabbi of Pabianice, son of Rabbi Yehudah Aryeh Leib Alter and brother of Rabbi Avraham Mordechai Alter, murdered in Treblinka August 12, 1942.
- Paweł Janas (born 1953), football player and coach
- Mieczysław Klimek (1913–1995), Polish professor, engineer, prisoner of Nazi concentration camps during World War II
- Marcin Komorowski (born 1984), football player
- Kinga Królik
- Krystyna Mikołajewska (born 1939), actress
- Bolesław Nawrocki (1877–1946), Polish painter
- Józef Pluskowski (1896–1950), poet
- Aleksandra Shelton (born 1982), sabre fencer
- Stanisław Staszewski (1925–1973), Polish architect and poet, Polish resistance participant during World War II, prisoner of the Mauthausen concentration camp
- Henryk Stenzel (1899–1980), American paleontologist of Polish and Jewish descent
- Jadwiga Wajs (1912–1990), discus thrower

== International relations ==
=== Twin towns – sister cities ===
Pabianice is twinned with:

- Rokiškis in Lithuania (since 1998)
- Plauen in Germany (since 2005)
- Kerepes in Hungary (since 2009)

Former twin towns:

- Gusev in Russia (since 2002 until 2022)

In March 2022, Pabianice ended its partnership with the Russian city of Gusev as a response to the 2022 Russian invasion of Ukraine.
