= Colin Gardner (academic) =

British academic

- Education: St John's College, Cambridge (BA, MA); University of California, Los Angeles (PhD)
- Occupation: University professor

Colin Gardner is a British Distinguished professor emeritus of Critical Theory and Integrative Studies at the University of California, Santa Barbara. His work is focused on film and media studies, comparative literature and history of art and architecture.

Working at the intersection of film-philosophy, Deleuze and Guattari studies and interdisciplinary media theory, Gardner received his B.A. and M.A. in History from St John's College, Cambridge, and Ph.D. in Cinema Studies at UCLA before becoming Professor of Critical Theory and Integrative Studies at the University of California, Santa Barbara, where he taught in the Departments of Art and Film & Media Studies, the History of Art and Architecture, and the Comparative Literature program before his retirement as a Distinguished Professor in July 2023.

He has also expanded his research into the area of Media Geography, working in close collaboration with James Craine (Cal State Northridge). Their most recent essay is "Towards a Deterritorialized Nomadism: The Traversal Role of Children in Abbas Kiarostami's Where Is the Friend's House? (1987) and Life and Nothing More... (1992)," published in Film Landscapes of Global Youth: Imagining Young Lives, edited by Stuart C. Aitken & Jacob Rowlett (Routledge, 2024). He has also co-written an essay with Aleksandra Craine entitled “Becoming-Imperceptible: Emotional Support Animals (ESAs) as a Form of Affective Immanence.” It was published in 2026 in Cultural Geographies journal. Gardner is also on the editorial boards of two journals: Criticism (Wayne State University) and the Journal of Ecohumanism (London).

== Publications ==
Gardner’s latest publication is an anthology, co-edited with Fulbright scholar Jennifer Vanderpool, entitled Performative Representation of Working-Class Laborers: They Work Hard for the Money (Palgrave Macmillan, 2024) which focuses on the performative aspect of labor as art and affect, thereby becoming more ethically sensate and less concerned with the exploited body of laborers in a strictly Marxist reading.

His most recent book chapter is “From Analogue Facialities to Digital Probeheads: Deterritorializing the Photographic Composites of Francis Galton and Nancy Burson,” published in renee c. hoogland’s 2026 Vernon Press anthology, The Analogue Revisited: Questioning the Technical Image in a Digital Age.

His most recent monograph is Chaoid Cinema: Deleuze and Guattari and the Topological Vector of Silence (Edinburgh University Press, 2021), which explores the use of silences and sonic drop-outs in sound films as a means of exploring different organizations of chaos (Chaoids) that underlie the surface plane of narrative. This builds upon his previous book, Beckett, Deleuze and the Televisual Event: Peephole Art (Palgrave Macmillan, 2012), a critical study of Samuel Beckett’s experimental work for film and television and its connection to Gilles Deleuze’s ontology of the image in Cinema 1 and Cinema 2. Excerpts have appeared in Deleuze Studies Journal (2012) and Continuum Books’ Gilles Deleuze: Image and Text (2009). He is the co-editor of two anthologies with Professor Patricia MacCormack (Anglia Ruskin University): Deleuze and the Animal (Edinburgh University Press, 2017) and Ecosophical Aesthetics: Art, Ethics and Ecology With Guattari (Bloomsbury Publishing, 2018). Gardner contributed the chapter on Roland Barthes to Felicity Colman’s Film, Theory & Philosophy: The Key Thinkers (Acumen, 2009.

Gardner has also published two books in Manchester University Press’s “British Film Makers” series: a critical study of the blacklisted American film director, Joseph Losey (2004), and a monograph on the Czech-born, British filmmaker and critic, Karel Reisz (2006). The latter study led to his being a featured interviewee in Karel Reisz: This Filming Life, a 2012 Czech documentary film produced by Jarmila Hoznauerová and directed by Petra Všelichová (a Co-Production of Czech Television—Ostrava Television Studio). Related research on Losey has also appeared in Kimberly Drake's Critical Insights: Paranoia, Fear & Alienation (Salem Press, 2016), Trudy Bolter’s Le politique éclaté (Paris: L’Harmattan); the Franco-American film journal, Iris; the Parisian web-based theoretical journal, Critical Secret No. 6 (2001), Interdisciplinary Humanities (2002), Media History (2006), and Lo Sguardo dei Maestri’s Joseph Losey: Senza Re, Senza Patria (Milan: Il Castoro, 2010).

Gardner is also the author of critical essays on Bruno Ganz’s characters in Knife in the Head and In the White City for Silke Panse and Dennis Rothermel’s A Critique of Judgment in Film and Television (Palgrave Macmillan); Bob Rafelson’s Five Easy Pieces (for Creation Books’ Jack Nicholson: Movie Top Ten, edited by Mikita Brottman); as well as a theoretical study of Diana Thater’s video installations in Space, Site, Intervention: Situating Installation Art (Erika Suderberg, ed.) for the University of Minnesota Press.

His extensive list of catalog monographs includes essays on Peter Halley for the Santa Barbara Museum of Art, Mike Kelley for the Whitney Museum of American Art, John Baldessari for the Graphische Sammlung, Albertina in Vienna, Wallace Berman for Amsterdam's Institute of Contemporary Art, video artist Rachel Khedoori for the Kunsthalle in Basel and Mike Bouchet's film works for Sternberg Press in Berlin. On a local level, Gardner has worked extensively with the Santa Barbara Museum of Art (as blogger, panelist and lecturer) and the Contemporary Arts Forum (CAF), including catalog essays for Sandow Birk's “Prisonation” series, Linda Stark's “Runaway Love” retrospective, and the 2001 group exhibition, “Diabolical Beauty,” co-curated with UCSB Professor, Jane Callister. Gardner was also co-curator and co-editor of Damaged Romanticism: A Mirror of Modern Emotion, an exhibition and accompanying book that was initiated by the Blaffer Gallery in Houston in 2008 and subsequently traveled to the Grey Gallery at NYU and the Parrish Museum on Long Island.

Gardner's public lectures include discussions of Stan Douglas's video work at Cal Arts and the Museum of Contemporary Art, Los Angeles; Diana Thater's "Knots + Surfaces" projected DVD installation at New York's Dia Center for Arts' Robert Lehman Lecture Series (published in 2006); "Decentered Spectatorship: Constructing a Hybrid Scopic Space in Recent Art Film and Video," at Louisville's Speed Art Museum; and analyses of cinema and the brain for Warren Neidich's "The Mutated Observer: Neurological Structures, Perception and Visual Culture" at UC Riverside's California Museum of Photography and his interdisciplinary panel on "Movies, Buildings and Brains" at UCLA.

== Appearances ==
In 2012 Gardner presented a keynote address “Samuel Beckett’s ‘Peephole’ Venus: Re-Sexualization, The Oral Mother and the Masochist Contract in Eh Joe, Ghost Trio and ...but the clouds...” at the “Venus as Muse: Figurations of the Creative” conference organized by the Internationales Kolleg Morphomata and the Centre for Media Studies, University of Cologne, Germany. In 2014 he presented a keynote address at The Centre for the Arts and Learning’s (CAL) series, “Material Cultures of Resistance.” Goldsmiths, University of London, England, titled “Probeheads of Resistance & The Heterotopic Mirror: Tiffany Chung and Dinh Q. Le’s Stratigraphic Cartographies.”

2014 keynote panels Gardner participated on include: “Out of the Labyrinth, Into the Métro: Becoming-Animal, the Waking Dream and Movements of World in Raymond Queneau and Louis Malle’s Zazie Dans Le Métro” to launch “The Animal Catalyst Network” and the publication of The Animal Catalyst: Towards Ahuman Theory (Bloomsbury Publishing), with Patricia MacCormack and Ruth McPhee (Anglia-Ruskin University, UK) at Anglia Ruskin University, Cambridge, England; “Judgment and/or Justice: Constructing an Affective Ethics” for the launch of A Critique of Judgment in Film and Television, Silke Panse and Dennis Rothermel, eds. (Palgrave Macmillan) at The SHOWROOM Gallery, London, England; “Into the Zone: Affective Counterpoint and Ecosophical Aesthetics in the Films of Terrence Malick” for “Screening Nature: Life, Catastrophes and Eco-sophy,” with Anne Sauvagnargues (Univ. of Paris, Nanterre), and Gregory Flaxman (Univ. of N. Carolina, Chapel Hill) at Queen Mary, University of London, England. Also in 2014 Gardner presented “The Twilight of the Idols: Perversity as Eternal Return and Will-to-Power in Antonio Margheriti’s The Virgin of Nuremburg [sic]” paper for the panel “The Politics of Perverse Desire in Italian neo-Gothic Cinema,” at the Conference on Spaghetti Cinema, The University of Bedfordshire, Luton, England. Panelists included Austin Fisher (Univ. of Bedfordshire, Chair); with Patricia MacCormack (Anglia Ruskin University, Cambridge, and Andreas Charalambous (Anglia Ruskin, Harlow).

In February 2018, Gardner delivered a keynote lecture entitled 'Drilling Into Language with Hollis Frampton’s 'Zorns Lemma' and Guy Debord’s 'Hurlements en faveur de Sade’ as part of the Visiting Scholar Scheme and ADM Lecture Series at the School of Arts, Design and Media at Nanyang Technological University, Singapore.

== Philanthropy ==
Gardner is a lifelong supporter of Brentford Football Club.
