= Agnieszka Kotlarska (actress) =

Polish actress (1971–2015)

Agnieszka Kotlarska (1971-March 10, 2015) was a Polish TV, film, and stage actress.

She was born in Pabianice, Łódź Voivodeship, Poland.

In 2007 she was awarded Silver Medal Gloria Artis.

She died of cancer, leaving a son and a daughter.
