= Pabianice Castle =

Sixteenth-century manor house in Pabianice, Poland

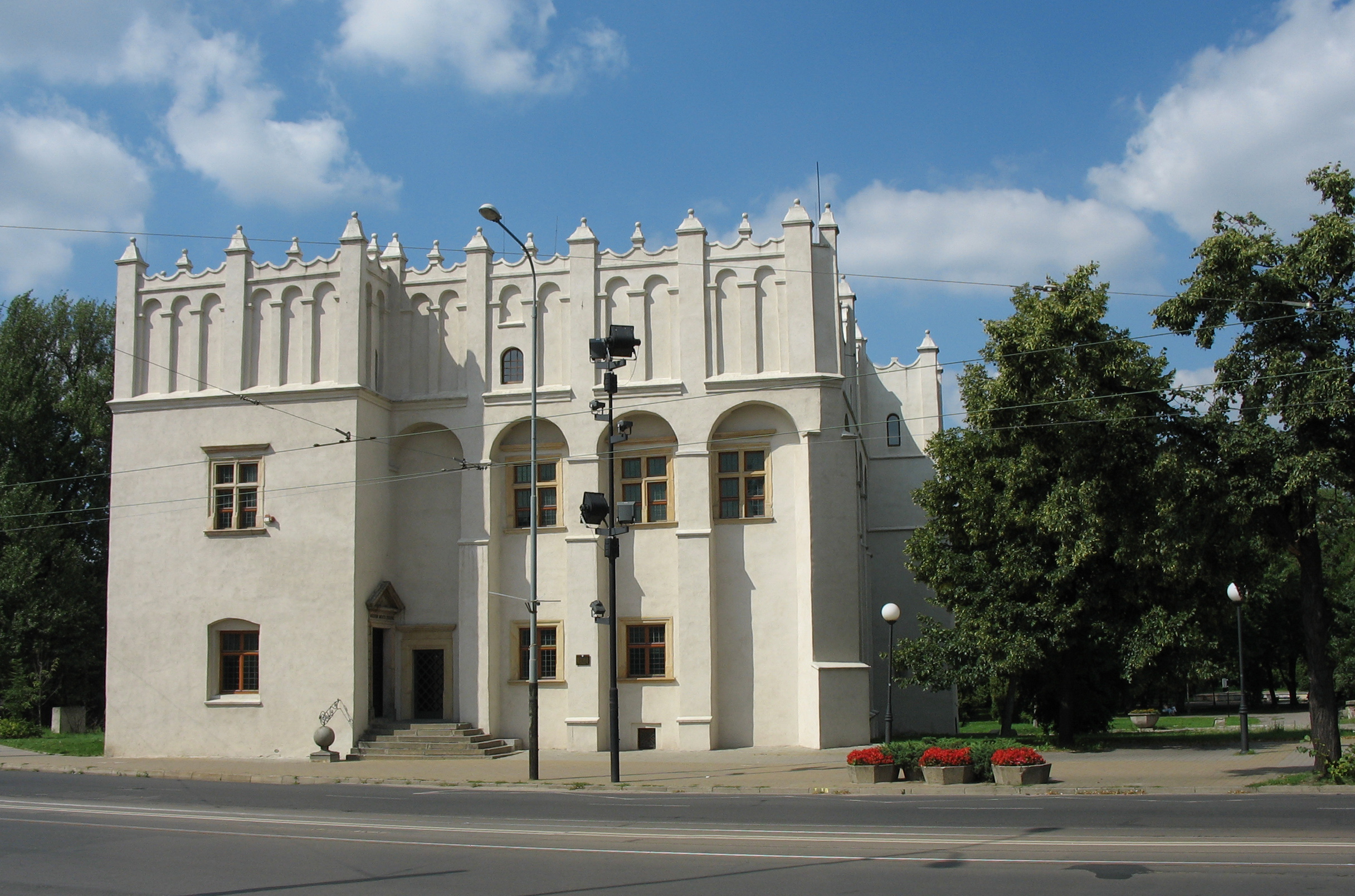
Front view

Pabianice Castle is a fortified manor house in Pabianice, Poland. The brick building was designed by Wawrzyniec Lorek and raised in 1565–1571. Over the years the building was a supervisors' residence of Kraków's chapter house and one of the greatest constructions in Łódź Voivodeship.

== History ==
The very first information in detail about the building itself were provided by Władysław Tatarkiewicz in his publications about modern architecture in Poland. In the 14th century, canonry had the wooden residence situated, as nowadays, on the east side of the city, which burned completely in 1532. Since then, it has been rebuilt many times. Final 16th-century construction of mansion house was more durable, as it was made out of brick and was also a decent defensive place, due to its location: between the backwaters and near Dobrzynka river. Part of the castle was situated on the opposite side of the river where the New City was going to be built at that time.

The local legend says that located in New City St. Mateusz church had connection with the "castle" through a tunnel. Tunnel was exclusively used by Pabianka princess, in case somebody might see her, as her beauty left much to be desired. Nevertheless, St. Mateusz church and the residence of Kraków's chapter house were the only two brick buildings in the city at the very beginning of the 19th century that last undamaged.

== Building ==
Build of the castle in Pabianice started in 1565 and it erected over five years. The leading architect was Wawrzyniec Lorek, with whom Kraków's chapter Stanisław Dąbrowski made a deal. As a reward he obliged to pay the architect 50 golden coins, popularly called "florens", and natural goods as wheat or oat. But for the precision and diligence of Lorek the process of building went smooth and fast without any delay. This fact pleased the Kraków's chapter, who was eager to finalize the project and started to fortify the mansion. In 1570 there was 10horse castle guard, defensive ditches and worth to say is that the minor hasn't been changed or damaged from that time.

Although the residence was finished at the beginning of 1571, there were still some works to be done inside the manor – paintings in great chamber and sculptures. Not until 1796 when the mansion house in Pabianice has been the residence of Kraków's chapter house, did it became the residence of Prussian goods administration. Till the end of 1822, the building was occupied by some tenants of Pabianice economics. Later it was hand over to weaving manufacturers' families. In 1833it was the headquarter of municipal office. After the World War II transformed into Museum Of Pabianice City, which exists to these days.

== Architecture ==
The castle is late renaissance brick building. Rectangular in shape, size 18 meters by 13 meters, has only one floor with corners risalit. Crowned with attic (It is said to be one of the most beautiful attics in Poland) with holes through which gargoyles pass. The interior was finished with barrel vaults with lunettes and the ground floor plan was exactly the same as the 1st floor. In the north-east and south-west corners "castle" has two towers with embrasures. The sentence in Latin "SIC TRANSIT GLORIA MUNDI" ("Thus passes the glory of the world.") is craved in one of the niches. On the ground floor windows are decorated with "Poraj" and "Aaron" family crests stone bordings and there is also a room with an 18th-century rococo fireplace. Till now, through the three centuries the manor in Pabianice had only one major reconstruction – hemispherical tower was built from the west side of erection in the 19th century and the entrance from the south side was displaced onto west side of avant-corps.

== Interesting facts ==
In the 1860s the renaissance polychromes from the 16th century were discovered in mansion house, located in dining room hidden under the thick layer of plaster. Unique and one of its kind in the region, compared to the Wawel's polychromes, those in Pabianice feature floral ornaments. To attract tourists, it is planned to reconstruct the polychromes by contemporary artist. Moreover, the authorities of the museum decided to reveal other polychromes painted by the artist Jan Szulc whose artistic creation was related with cities such as Łódź and Pabianice. This late polychromes are dated on 1917 and were painted on four walls of north-east alcove inside the castle.
