= Heiki Valk =

Estonian archaeologist

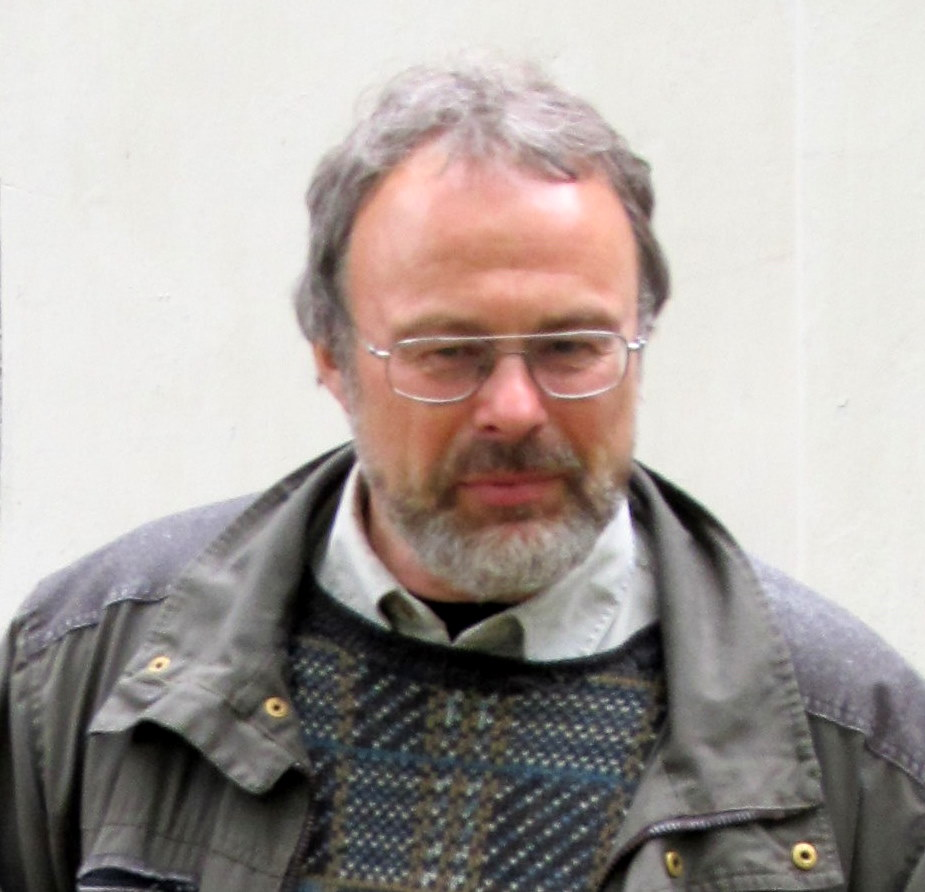
Heiki Valk

Heiki Valk (born 7 May 1959, in Tartu) is an Estonian archaeologist. He is a senior research fellow and head of archaeological laboratory at the University of Tartu specializing in Estonia in the Middle Ages. Since 23 January 2008, he has been the chairman of the Estonian Learned Society, and he was its secretary from 1993 to 1996.

He graduated in history from the University of Tartu in 1983. He wrote the thesis Rural Cemeteries of Southern Estonia 1225–1800 AD (2001). He also served as the scientific secretary for the archaeology of Tartu from 1992 to 1999.

He is a recipient of the President's Award in folklore (1994).

== Works ==
- Kodu Lugu. Parts 1 and 2. With Mart Laar and Lauri Vahtre.
- Lõuna-Eesti talurahva matmiskombestik ja selle uskumuslikud tagamaad 13.-17/18. sajandil. Master's thesis. Tartu, 1992.
- Rural Cemeteries of Southern Estonia 1225–1800 AD. Doctoral dissertation. Visby: Gotland University College, Centre for Baltic Studies, 2001.
- Siksälä: a Community at the Frontiers: Iron Age and Medieval. With Silvia Laul. Tallinn, Tartu, 2007.
- Strongholds and Power Centres East of the Baltic Sea in the 11th–13th Centuries. [Compiled and edited by Heiki Valk]. Muinasaja Teadus 24. Tartu, 2014
