= Aleksa Radovanović =

- Born: 2 August 1900; Medveđa, Kingdom of Serbia
- Died: 23 June 2004 (aged 103); Medveđa, Serbia and Montenegro
- Military career
- Allegiance: Kingdom of Serbia; Kingdom of Yugoslavia; SFR Yugoslavia
- Branch: Royal Serbian Army (1914–18); Royal Yugoslav Army (1919–20); Yugoslav Partisans (1941–45)
- Rank: Major
- Conflicts: World War I World War II
- Awards: Legion of Honor gold Obilić medal silver Obilić medal Medal of Kosančić Ivan; Order of Vojvoda Stepe; Medal of King Peter I Partisan Memorial in 1941

Aleksa Radovanović (Serbian Cyrillic: Алекса Радовановић; 2 August 1900 – 23 June 2004) was a Serbian soldier and the longest surviving veteran who fought in the Macedonian front theatre in World War I.

== Biography ==
Radovanović was born on 2 August 1900, in the village of Marići near the town of Medveđa in southern Kingdom of Serbia. At the age of fourteen he volunteered for service in World War I and joined a komit unit led by Kosta Vojinović. In early October 1915, he was wounded while fighting Bulgarian troops, before taking part in the Serbian army's retreat through Albania in the winter of 1915, and the Salonika front offensive in September 1918.

After the war, in January 1919, he was called up for compulsory military service in the Royal Yugoslav Army and served 18 months in a King's Guard unit in Belgrade during the reign of King Peter I. As a World War I volunteer, he was later awarded a five hectare plot of land near Uroševac in southern Kosovo by King Alexander I. In 1932, he became a member of the Yugoslav gendarmerie and was stationed in a series of cities around Kingdom of Yugoslavia, including Priština, Split, Mostar, Peć and Prizren.

During the outbreak of World War II and the 1941 invasion of Yugoslavia he was in Prizren, where he joined the Yugoslav Partisans. He was wounded and captured by Bulgarian troops, and by the end of the war he rose to the rank of major. Apart from Aleksa, his two brothers were also volunteers in both world wars - his older brother Radivoj was executed by a German firing squad in Prokuplje and his younger brother Radovan was shot by Germans in Uroševac. Radivoj's son Milisav also joined the Partisans in 1941.

Radovanović was awarded a number of decorations for his service:

- French Legion of Honour
- Serbian Medal of Miloš Obilić, Silver
- Serbian Medal of Miloš Obilić, Golden
- Serbian Medal of Ivan Kosančić
- Yugoslav Commemorative Partisans' Medal of 1941

Radovanović died on 23 June 2004 and was buried in his home village. He was survived by six daughters, 12 grandchildren, 24 great-grandchildren and four great-great-grandchildren.

== See also ==
- Momčilo Gavrić, youngest soldier in World War I
