= Józef Pluskowski =

Polish poet, teacher, administrator

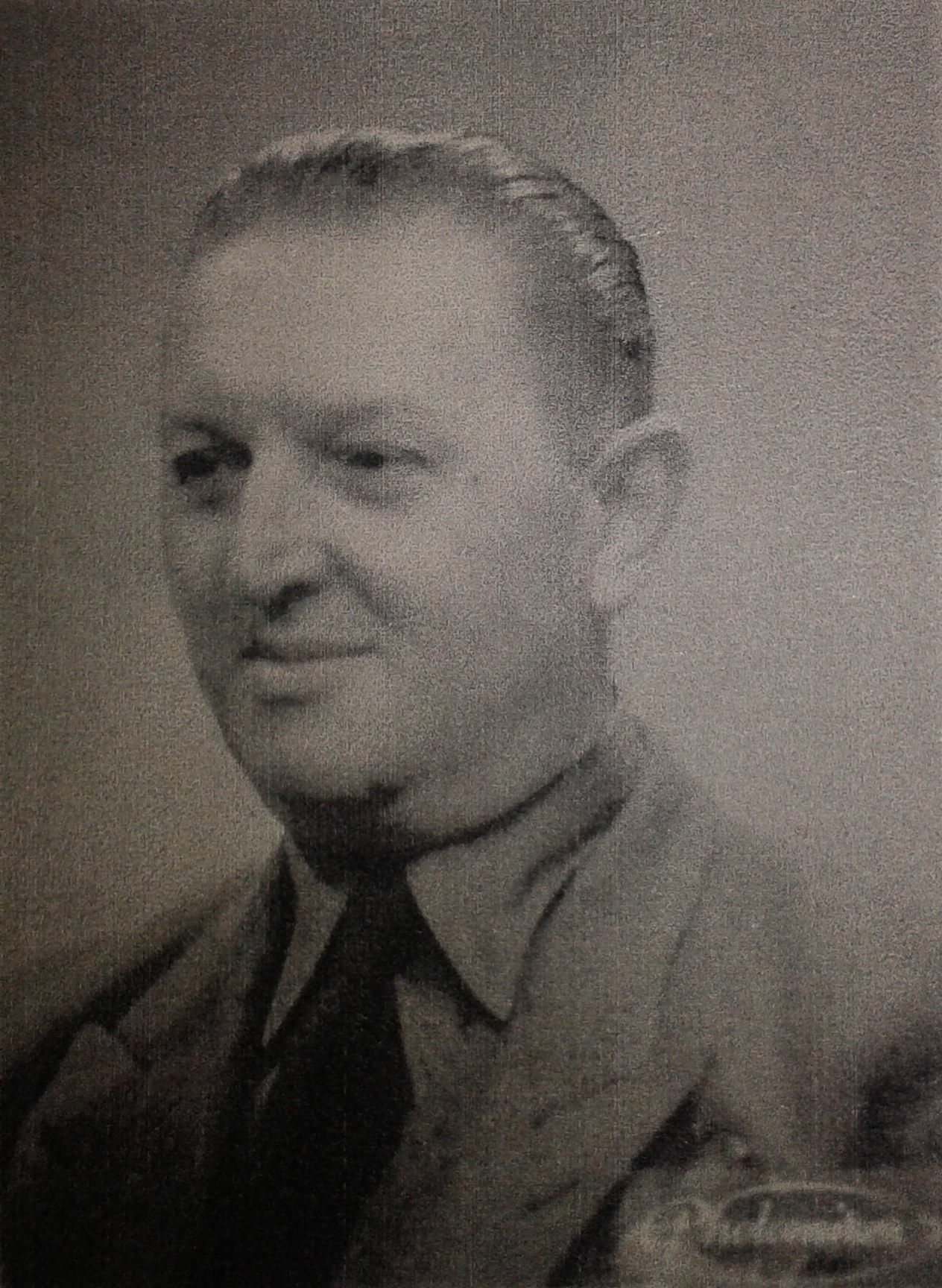
Józef Pluskowski

Józef Pluskowski (22 December 1896 – 28 November 1950) was a Polish poet, teacher, administrator and member of the Polish Resistance under the pseudonym "Mierzwa". He played an active role in the Warsaw Ghetto Uprising and the Warsaw Uprising. He was born in Pabianice, Poland and died aged 53 in exile in Montfermeil, Paris, France.

== Early life ==
Józef was born to Julian Pluskowski and Agnieszka Dolewska in Pabianice, then under Prussian control. After studying at St Petersburg University and fluent in Polish, German, Russian, and French, he returned to Pabianice where he became a teacher. During this time, from 1914-1918, he acted as a liaison-member of the secret Polish Military Organisation (POW) formed by Józef Piłsudski. The Pabianice district history records, under the section on Peowiacy, presents a short memoir by Pluskowski of a clash with German police whilst curfew-breaking to hang POW posters in 1918. He also wrote a paper in 1932 entitled "Komendant Józef Piłsudzki w walce o wolność Polski". In 1937 his contribution was acknowledged with the Cross of Independence (Krzyż Niepodległości), awarded to individuals who had "fought heroically for the Independence of Poland". Among the various privileges, it gave recipients a right to be elected to the Senate of the Republic of Poland.

Working in Warsaw as Inspector of Schools, he developed his ideas and published several volumes of poetry, including Na rubieżach śnień and Płomienne dale, both by Editions M. Fruchtman in Warsaw, 1938. In the same year, he married Irena Turczyńska-Sikorska, a Warsaw schoolteacher. Płomienne dale came out in a second edition that same year followed by Trubadur z kolorowych bajek, also by Fruchtman in 1939.

== Resistance and the Warsaw Ghetto ==
"Warsaw was said to have two special treasures: its mayor and its poets"

During the Nazi-Soviet invasions of 1939, Pluskowski was awarded the Cross of Valour (Krzyź Walecznych). This was certified by the legendary ex-mayor, Civilian Commissar Stefan Starzyński, who had become the symbol of the defence of Warsaw. An early organiser of what became the Armja Krajowa (AK) resistance, Starzyński is believed to have been shot at Dachau in October 1943. Pluskowski remained in Warsaw during the "Generalgouvernement" period when the Nazis, as described by his contemporary, the poet Czesław Miłosz, divided the local population into those for quicker extermination (the Jews) and those assigned for slave labour. Miłosz wrote, "A generation was lost. Also cities. Nations."

An active underground state grew up in opposition where Pluskowski was "assigned" by his superiors to work in the ghetto. He found the Jewish Underground, provided forged documents for many of their members, served as a liaison between the ghetto and the outside, was a source of valuable information and supplied the fighters with ammunition for the Warsaw Ghetto Uprising. On one occasion, his wife supplied the ghetto with 97 grenades hidden in her fur coat. Pluskowski, who lived in the "Aryan" side, concealed eight Jewish families in his apartment and continued giving aid even after the Uprising had been crushed. In a statement issued by the Łódź Jewish Committee, 3 December 1946, Gustaw-Gerszen Miller testified that he and his family had been sheltered by the Pluskowskis in their multi-room home at 5 Elektoralna for over two and a half years, even though discovery would have meant instant execution for Józef and his family as well, and had been present in an adjoining room when Józef was interrogated by the Gestapo about smuggling Jews out of the ghetto and hiding them in Grodzisk and Warsaw. He further states that during a second series of interrogations, which lasted seven days, Pluskowski was tortured.

Throughout this period of occupation, when teaching in Polish was forbidden, alongside its use in public meetings and cultural events, Pluskowski continued to write and participated in numerous clandestine poetry readings. His poems of that period, printed on a duplicating machine and circulated as broadsheets, were collected in 1944 as Z walki i pracy. Poezje. After readings, he always slept in different locations so as not to be identified or followed home.

== Warsaw Uprising ==
Pluskowski participated in the Warsaw Uprising as lieutenant of the Polish Armed Forces and was awarded Poland's highest military decoration for valor, the Virtuti Militari, on 5 August 1944. He was captured on 7 August and, including a period of seven weeks in a concentration camp, remained in a POW camp in Gerolstein, Germany, until liberated by the Allies on 8 March 1945. His son, Andrzej, was born during the Warsaw Uprising on 23 September, as Pluskowski later wrote, "on a table, in our cellar, in the middle of a German bombardment". Although he was unable to see his son for the first time until after the war ended, he wrote a moving letter on his name-day, sent from the prison camp in Gerolstein, Germany. Earlier, on 11 November, he had written a "Letter from Captivity" poem, later collected as part of the Kolorowe listy series.

Liberated in March 1945, Pluskowski was, shortly after, made commander of the Polish Guard Company alongside the US Army in Paris. He requested repatriation to Poland and returned via Reims/Épernay on 15 November. Records state that he had been wounded three times. Warsaw having been totally destroyed, he joined his family in nearby Mińsk Mazowiecki, and attempted to start a business enterprise. He was, however, quickly made unwelcome by the authorities, briefly imprisoned, and only rescued due to the efforts of the Jewish Underground group Bricha who spirited him over the Tatra Mountains to Czechoslovakia and eventually back to Paris.

== Life in exile ==
On 26 August 1948, a certificate issued by the administrator of <ŚWIATŁO (Édition La Lumière) at Rue d'Alsace guaranteed Józef Pluskowski an appointment as editor for a period of 12 months, at a salary of 15000 Francs (Ff). There is also a residence record at 3, Rue Brey, and his French identity card /passport, issued December 1948, lists his profession as Rédacteur-journaliste. In August 1948 the Bricha group arranged for his wife and son to leave Poland by train as Jewish immigrants travelling to the newly proclaimed State of Israel. They travelled on passports and papers issued to a Rachelle Miller and her son Adam. Not trusting a four year old to remember a change of name, Andrzej/Adam was instructed, if asked his name, to answer, "I don't remember", an answer he persisted with for many months afterwards.

During this period, Pluskowski wrote poems of longing for his country, "Codzień Jestem w Kraju" (Every Day I am in My Country) and "Tęsknota za Ojczyzną" (Longing for My Fatherland); a Parisian interlude "Paryskie Chimery" followed, describing times in favourite cafés and fishing in the River Marne (with his old friend Zygmunt Zaremba). Among his last poems is one addressed "Do Żydów" (To the Jews) in which, having witnessed the horrors of the ghetto first-hand, he celebrated the creation of Eretz Yisrael, the Jewish homeland. By the end of 1949, he had assembled a last, carefully chosen selection from all his poetic writings entitled "Dziewięćdziesiąt Cztery Utwory Poetyckie" (94 Poetic Creations) by Edition Libella, Paris.

== Death and funeral ==
A second son, Grzegorz was born and in October 1950, Pluskowski applied for immigration to the United States where he had distant relatives. His health had been steadily weakening, however, and he died of exhaustion in November at the age of 53.

At his funeral, a broadsheet was circulated with an article he had written for the Polish Socialist Press, extolling "La Marseillaise" as a song that "since 1792 enflamed all those who had loved Freedom above all". It was entitled "Pieśń Purpurowa" (The Purple Song) and finished with the words, "always will the Marseillaise work its magic on people who long for Freedom and fight for it". When leaving Poland, Pluskowski had been entrusted with an ancient Torah scroll parchment by the Miller family to take to safety. He brought it with him to Paris. Following his death, his wife Irena was invited to come to Britain by former Polish President/Prime Minister in Exile, Mr Tomasz Arciszewski. She left the Torah scroll in Paris (with family friends, Mr and Mrs Neimann and Mr Z. Solski). Having settled into a teaching job in London with her children, in the late 1950s she instructed her Paris friends to bequeath the scroll to an appropriate Jewish institution.

In 1968, Józef Pluskowski – "Mierzwa" – was posthumously awarded the Armia Krajowa Cross (Krzyż Armii Krajowej), given to commemorate the soldiers of the Home Army (Armja Krajowa) between 1939-1945 and established by General Bór-Komorowski in 1966. In May 2015, Józef Pluskowski was added to the list of the Polish Righteous by the Museum of the History of Polish Jews, POLIN, in Warsaw. In March 2016, the Commission for Designation of the Righteous at Yad Vashem awarded Józef Pluskowski and Irena Pluskowska the status of Righteous Among the Nations.

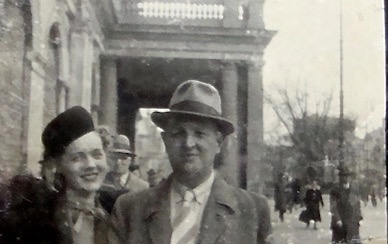
Józef and Irena Pluskowski in Warsaw, 1938

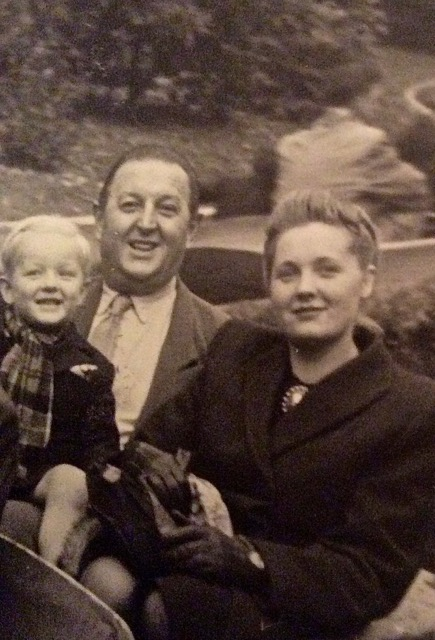
Józef, Irena and Andrzej Pluskowski in Paris, 1948

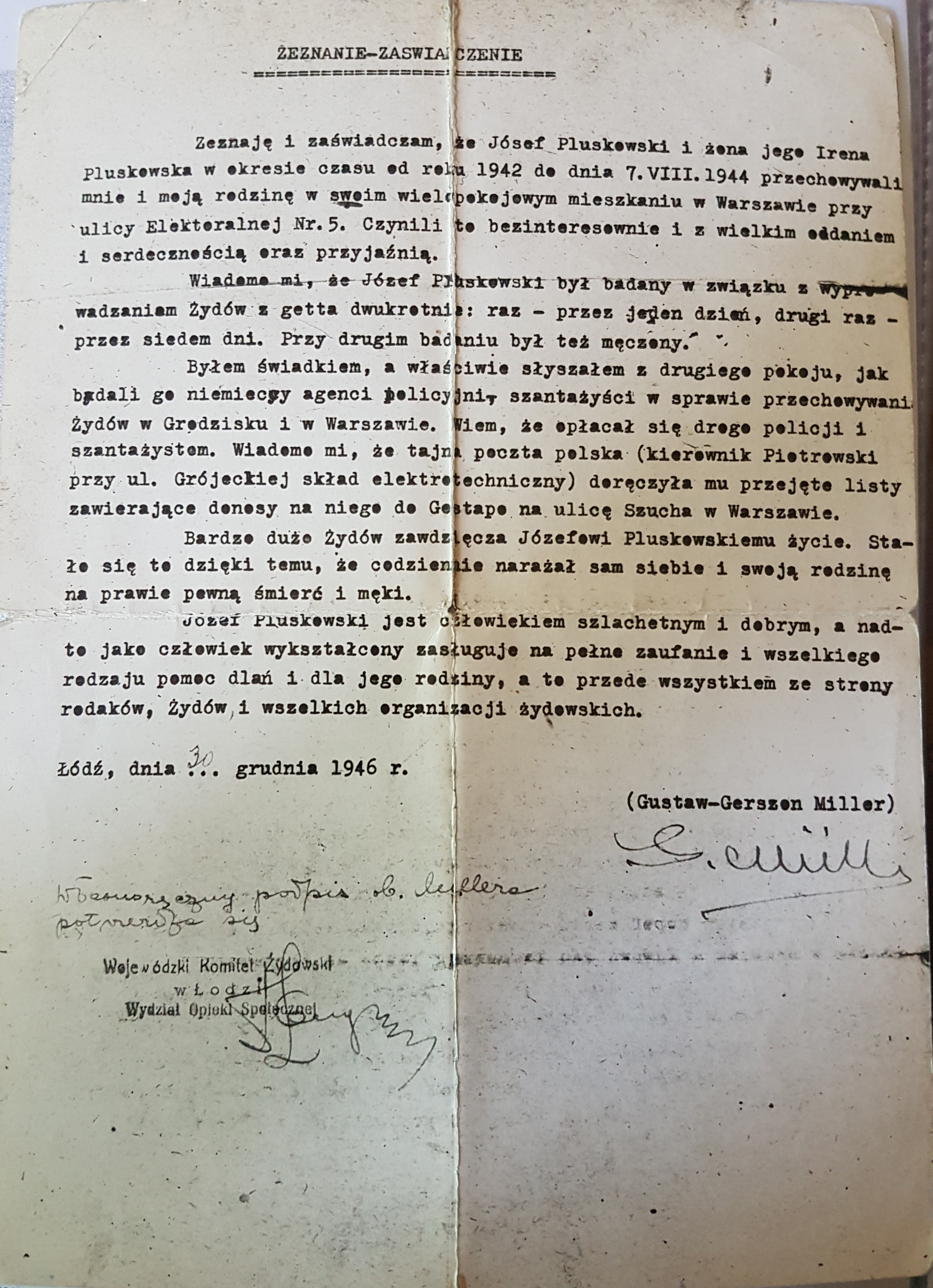
Deposition at Łódź Jewish Committee on Józef concealing Miller Family

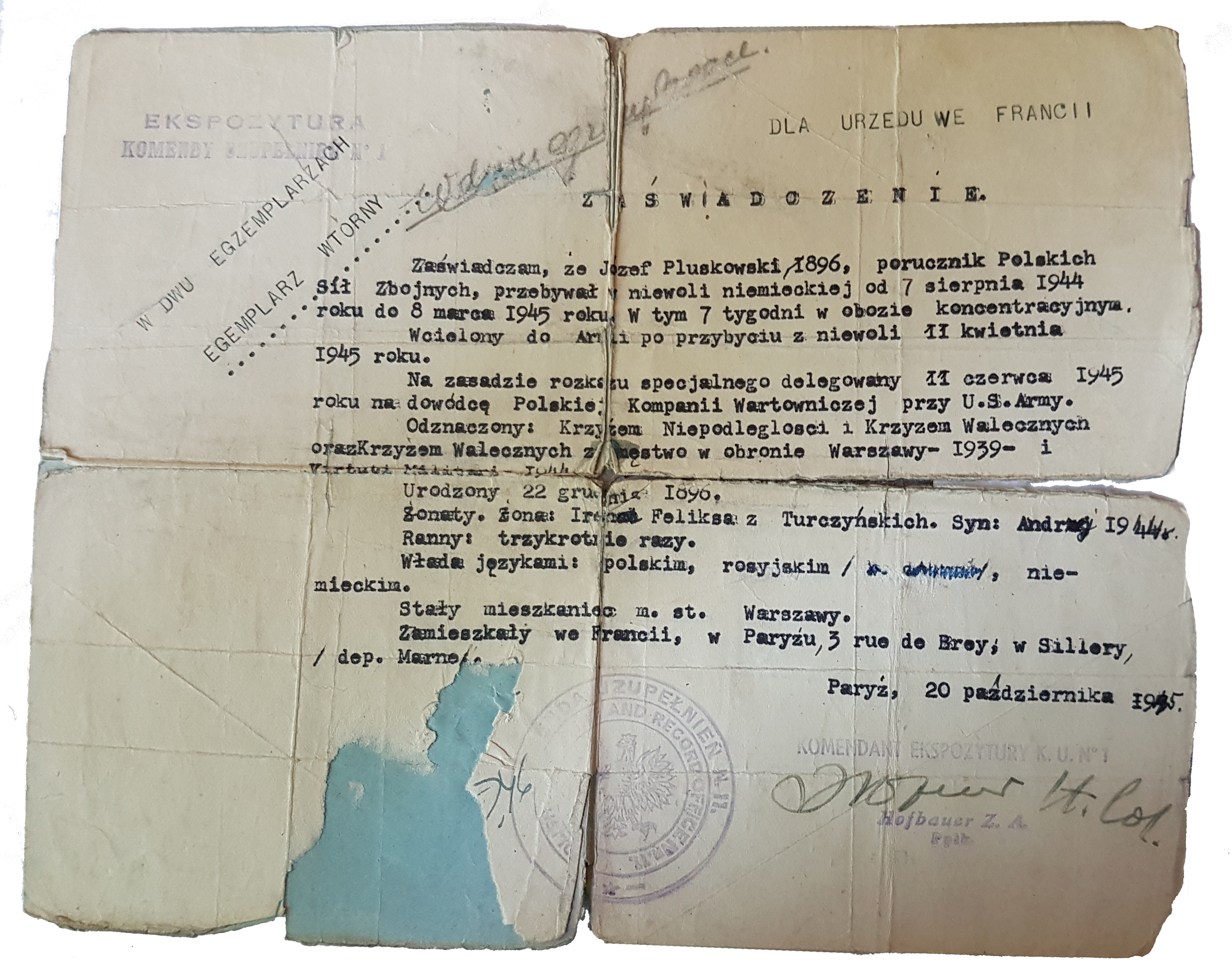
Józef Pluskowski's military record: as lieutenant; 7 weeks in a concentration camp; Virtuti Militari award; wounded 3 times

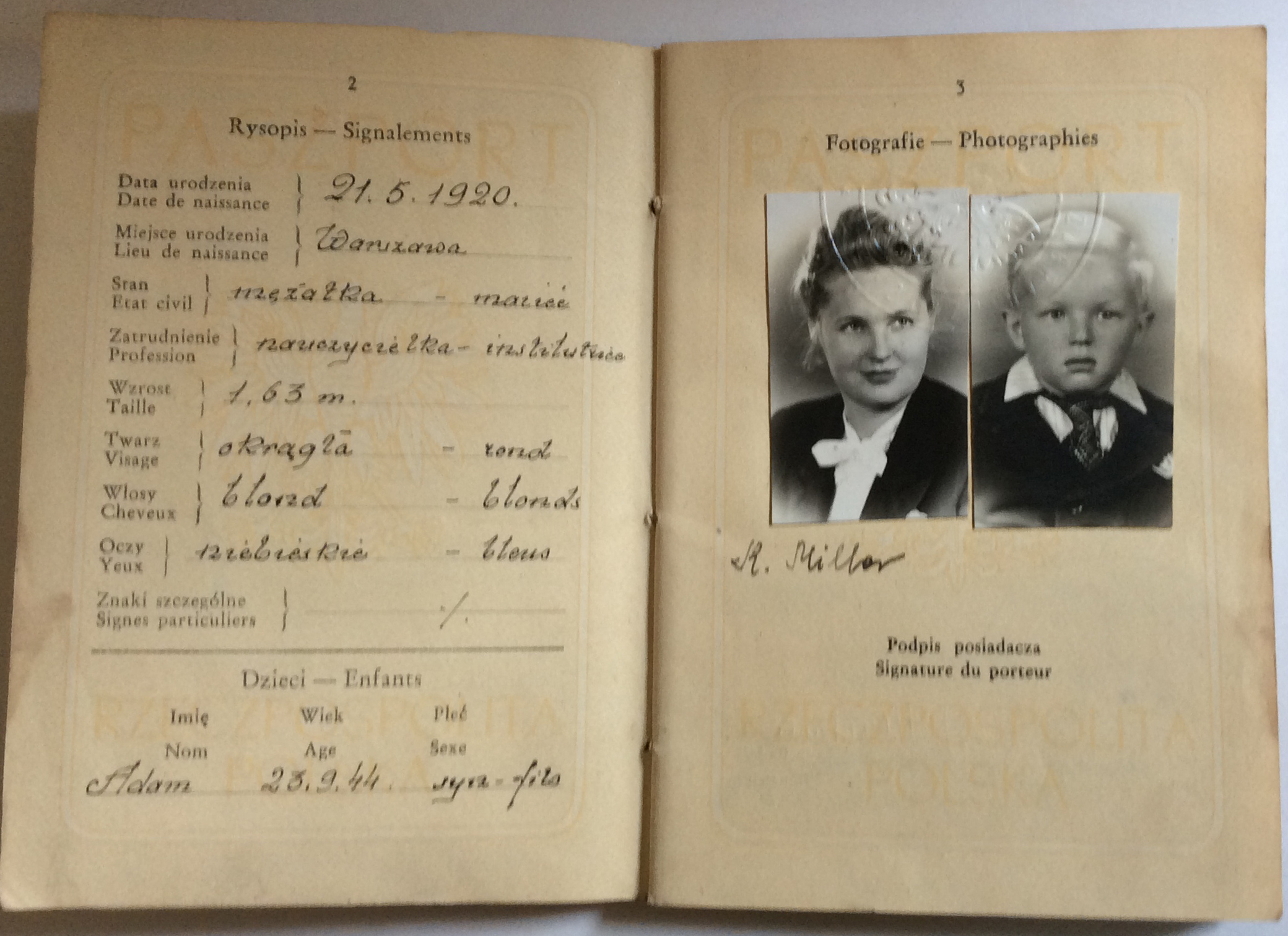
Passport issued for emigration from Poland to Rachele Miller and her son Adam in 1948

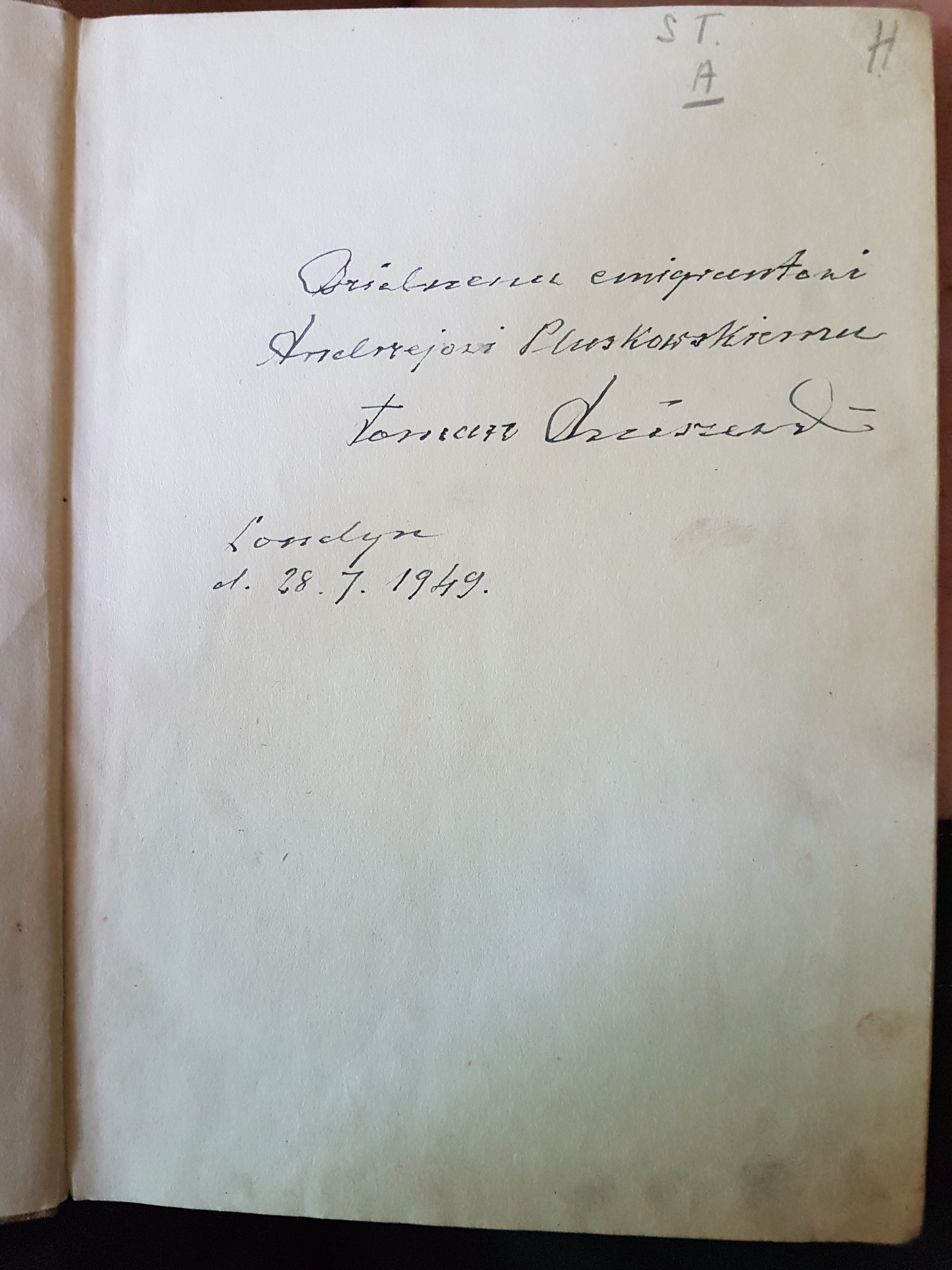
A letter to "the brave emigrant Andrzej Pluskowski", signed by Tomasz Arciszewski (the Polish Prime Minister in exile)

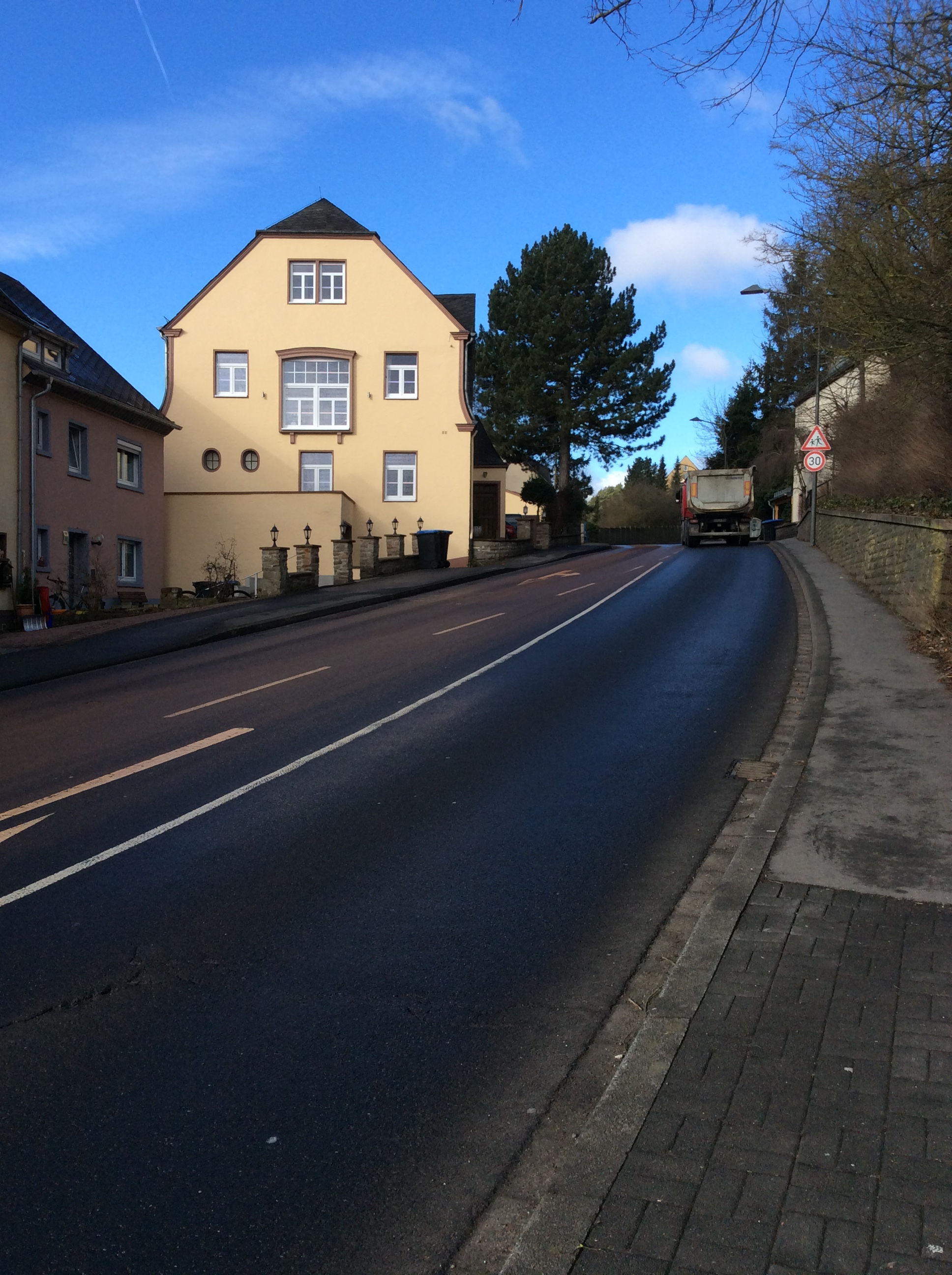
Gerolstein, where Józef was sent to the Officers Transit Camp

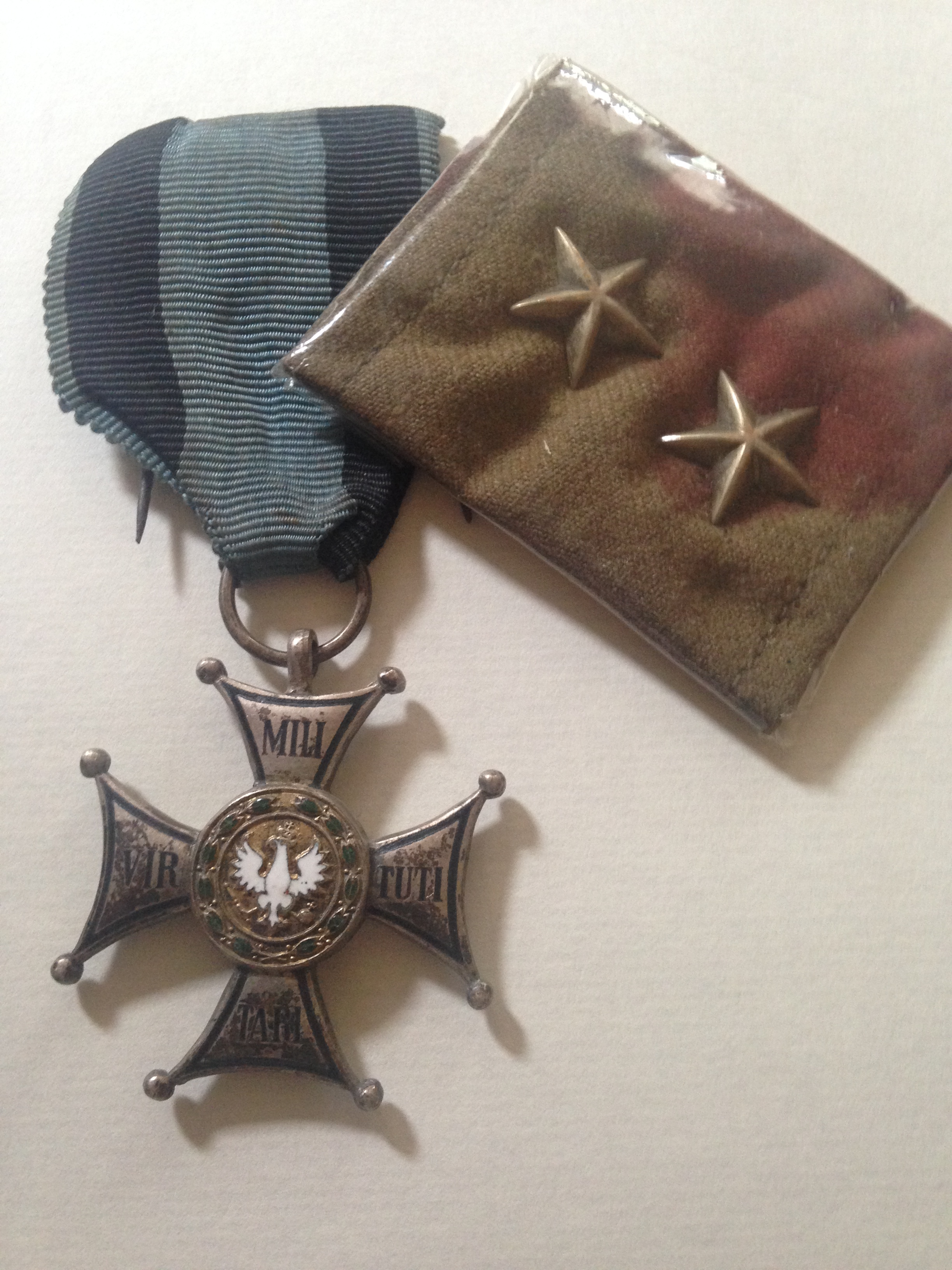
Józef Pluskowski's military insignia and Virtuti Militari award

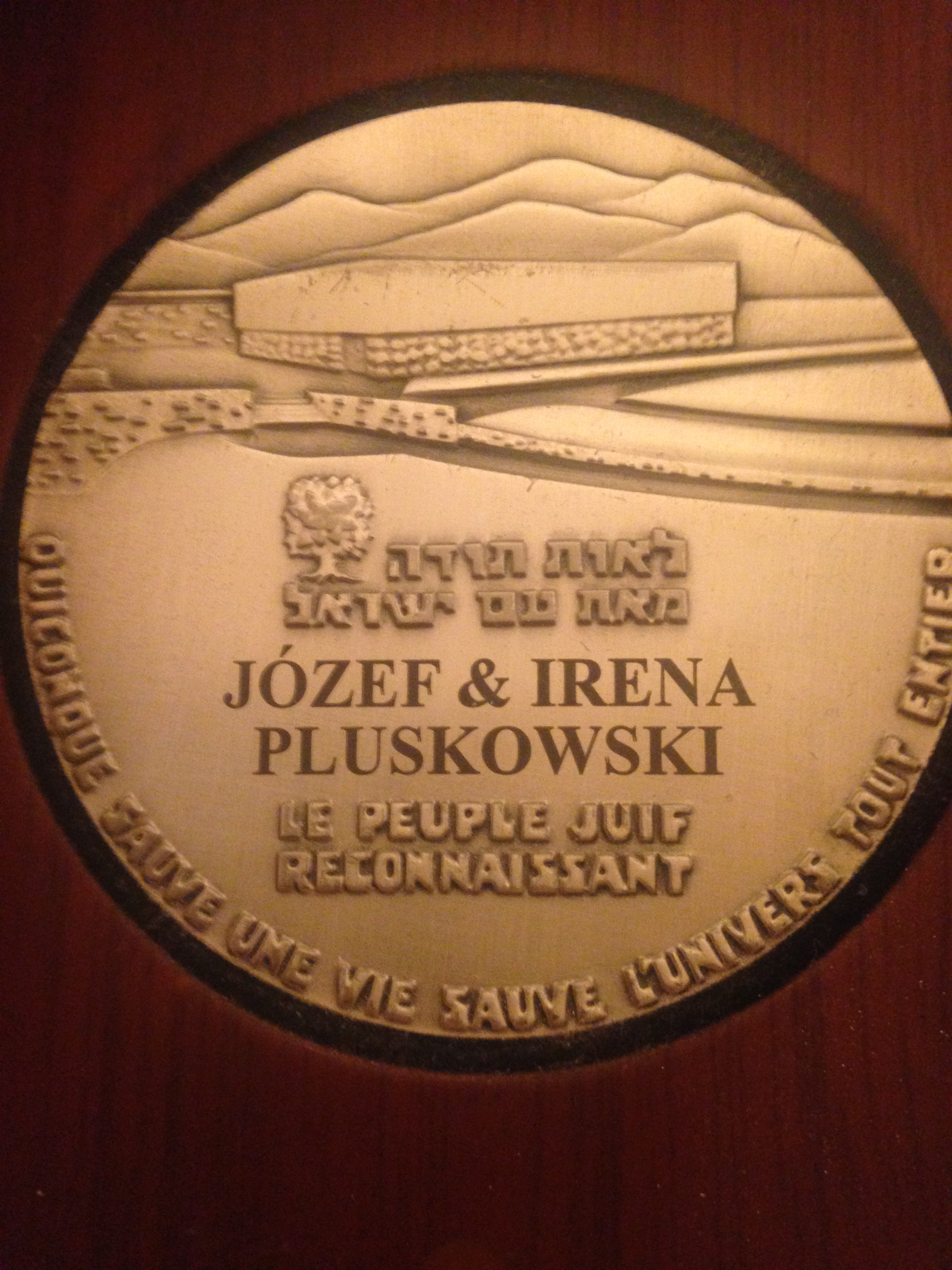
Józef Pluskowski's and Irena Pluskowska's Yad Vashem medal, 2016
