= Aleksa (surname) =

- Lithuanian surname
- m.: Aleksa
- f.: (unmarried): Aleksaitė
- f.: (married): Aleksienė
- Origin: From a given name, diminutive from Alexander

Aleksa is a Lithuanian-language surname derived from the diminutive of the name Aleksandras (Alexander). Notable people with this surname include:

- Zigmas Angarietis (1882–1940), Lithuanian communist politician; birth surname Aleksa
- Jonas Dainius Aleksa, Lithuanian musician, a recipient of the Lithuanian National Prize for Culture and Arts
- Jonas Pranas Aleksa, minister of agriculture of Lithuania, 1926
- Konstantin Aleksa (born 2007), Austrian footballer

== See also ==
- Alexa (disambiguation)
