= Alexa =

Alexa may refer to:

== Technology ==
- Amazon Alexa, a virtual assistant developed by Amazon
- Alexa Internet, a defunct website ranking and traffic analysis service
- Alexa Fluor, a family of fluorescent dyes
- Arri Alexa, a digital motion picture camera

== People ==
- Alexa (name), a given name and surname
- AleXa, American pop singer based in South Korea

== Other uses ==
- Alexa (plant), a genus of legumes
- Alexa (typeface), a typeface
- 2013 Middle East cold snap, also referred to as Alexa
- One Night's Intoxication, a 1951 German film released in Austria as Alexa
