= Jennifer Vanderpool =

American artist

- Known for: Printmaking, installation, video, performance art
- Notable work: Hysterical Paradise (2008); Wanton (2011); Hometown Story: Youngstown Steel Kitchens (2012); Family Stories/Сімейні історії (2013); Super Natural (2014)
- Awards: National Endowment for the Arts Challenge America grant (2002); Andy Warhol Foundation for the Visual Arts Featured Artist (2006); International artist grant from Kunstrådet, Danish Arts Council (2007); The Swedish Arts Council International Cultural Grant (2010); National Endowment for the Arts Art Works grant (2016)
- Website: jennifervanderpool.com

Jennifer Vanderpool is an American artist living and working in Los Angeles. In her work "there is a chipper cynicism to the retro character of the figures, buildings, fashions, and patterns, so that there is certainly a sense of tradition, yet there is also a sense of transference and surrealism."

== Career ==
In 2007, the Statens Kunstfond: Danish Arts Council awarded Vanderpool an artist grant for her exhibition Once Upon a Tart at RACA in Copenhagen, Denmark. Two years prior the Andy Warhol Foundation for the Visual Arts awarded funding for Vanderpool's site specific installation in Tulsa, Oklahoma.

Vanderpool created a series of molds as part of an installation for Virserums Konsthall titled Blomster in Virserum, Sweden in 2009; "Vanderpool uses the sculptural installation as a site where gender, sex, and food overlap in a curious play between aversion and craving, over-indulgence and restraint."

In 2010, the Kulturrådet: Swedish Arts Council awarded Vanderpool's exhibition Sagoberättelser at Designarkivet, Nybro, Sweden an International Cultural Grant, while Malmö Stad awarded her a cultural grant for her exhibition förgyllda trädgårda. That same year the City of Los Angeles Cultural Affairs Department, City of Los Angeles and Durfee Foundation awarded Vanderpool a grant for exhibitions that took place in Los Angeles and Bogotá, Colombia.

Her 2011 exhibition Wanton at the Galería Sextante in Bogotá, Colombia featured a variety of intricately designed sculptural and photographic works where "her ultra-baroque sensibility offers viewers a surfeit of visual and emotional pleasures, nothing is squandered."

Vanderpool created an installation in 2012 for the Butler Institute of American Art titled Hometown Story: Youngstown Steel Kitchens. The exhibition incorporated film and advertisements which addressed nostalgia, domesticity and gender roles.

In 2013, Vanderpool exhibited Family Stories/Сімейні Оповідання at Faina Gallery | Dmitry Futerman Gallery in conjunction with Kroshytskyi Art Museum, in Sevastopol, Crimea, Ukraine.

Whitehot Magazine of Contemporary Art included Vanderpool on their Best Artists List of 2013.

In 2014, she exhibited "Super Natural" at the National Centre for Contemporary Arts in Moscow, Russia. The exhibition included 26 digital postcards and two multichannel video works which "invite each viewer to investigate their beliefs about places and the people in them, using beauty as a guise to expose the facts behind the facade."

Vanderpool has served as a panelist for Plan B at the 24th International Sculpture Conference: Sculpture, Culture, & Community in New Orleans and for a symposium, Collecting Geographies: Global Programming and Museums of Modern Art, in 2014 at the Stedelijk Museum Amsterdam in Amsterdam, Netherlands.

In 2016, Vanderpool curated an exhibition titled "Imaginary Selves" at the Harris Gallery at University of La Verne in La Verne, California. The exhibition included works from Lisa Jevbratt, Jane Callister, Việt Lê, Brian McArthur, Catalina Jaramillo Quijano, and James Van Arsdale which explored notions of self through multiple modalities including race, genealogy, and music.

Pitzer College Art Galleries in Claremont, California received a National Endowment for the Arts grant in 2016 to exhibit A Moderate Proposal co-curated by Pitzer College Art Galleries Director/Curator Ciara Ennis and artist Jennifer Vanderpool.

Vanderpool exhibited Piter as a part of the Wende Museum and Cold War Archive's Artistic Interpretations of the Cold War in Culver City, California beginning in April 2016 alongside artists Farrah Karapetian, Richtje Reinsma and Daphne Rosenthal. Piter included 4 large-scale digital prints, 5 posters hung salon style with works from the Wende Museum's collection, a projected video and an interview with a Los Angeles resident who moved to the US after living in Soviet Union.

Vanderpool co-curated with Việt Lê Love in a Time of War at SF Camerawork in San Francisco, California which "demonstrates as love and war police bodies, there’s code-breaking and brinksmanship. The show is abound with subtle insertions and unknown histories, as well as humor and beauty."

She exhibited 5 videos as a part of the M.A.R.S. (Music & Arts ReSound) Festival in Los Angeles, California during April 2017.

Vanderpool exhibited a video from Super Natural, 2014–17 in Twenty/20, a month long film exhibition held by Edward Cella Art + Architecture in Los Angeles, California, each day featured a different artist's video playing on loop from the time the gallery opened to the time it closed.

She exhibited "Flores para el Trueque" curated by No Lugar: Arte Contemporáneo exhibited at La Huerta y La Maquina in Quito, Ecuador in May 2017 consisting of interviews with laborers involved in the floriculture industry in California and Ecuador alongside a series of 15 prints.

Vanderpool exhibited "Garment Girl", organized by Nguyễn Anh Tuấn, at Heritage Space, Hanoi, Vietnam featuring interviews with garment workers stories told by Vietnamese refugees in Los Angeles and academics' viewpoints on labor rights in the garment industry. The interviews were exhibited with a 3 part mural and a series of 6 large prints. "Remake" workshops, organized with artist and fashion designer Hồng Phạm, were also held prior to the opening of the exhibition to provide working poor women in Hà Nội a space to make new garments from recycled clothing.

Vanderpool was awarded an ArtSTART grant from The Ohio Arts Council for her most recent exhibition, "Untold Stories," which featured a series of 15 large-scale prints, vintage photographs from Opie Evans and the Goodyear archive, and poetic documentaries. The show opened up at the Tyler History Center in Youngstown, Ohio then travelled to Emily Davis Gallery at the University of Akron.

She has been a visiting artist at Pontificia Universidad Javeriana in Bogotá, Colombia, Ölands Konstskola in Öland, Sweden, the University of Amsterdam in Amsterdam, Netherlands, and Virginia Tech in Blacksburg, Virginia. Vanderpool has also been an artist in residence through the Hothouse 2015 program in the Department of World Arts and Cultures/Dance at the University of California, Los Angeles in Los Angeles.

== Visiting lecturer ==
Vanderpool has been a lecturer at the University of California, Santa Barbara; University of California, Los Angeles; Otis College of Art and Design and the Mount. St Mary's University, Los Angeles.

== Education ==
Vanderpool holds an Independent, Interdisciplinary Ph.D. from the University of California, Santa Barbara (UCSB), in the fields of Film and Media Studies, Comparative Literature and Interdisciplinary Humanities which was chaired by Dr. Colin Gardner and Dick Hebdige. She also holds an MFA in Spatial Studies and Critical Theory from UCSB, where she was a UC Regents Fellow. Vanderpool's other degrees include an MA in Modern Art and Architecture from Emory University, an MA in Community Art Intervention from Ohio State University, and a BA in history from Wittenberg University.
