= Aleksa Dundić =

Participant in October Revolution

Toma Aleksa Dundić
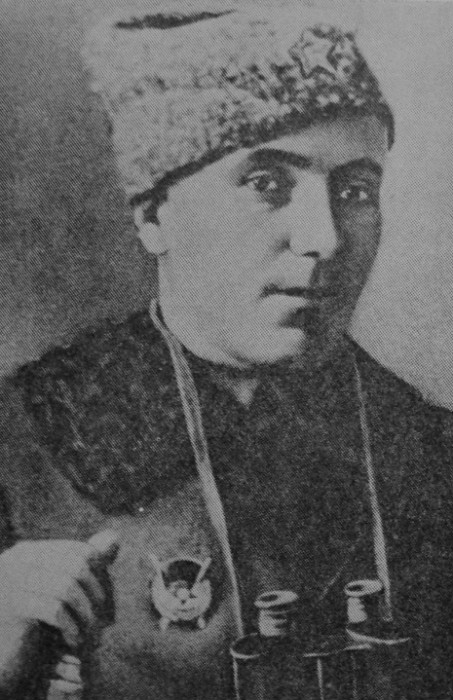
- Born: Toma Dundić; April 13, 1896; Grabovac, Kingdom of Dalmatia, Austria-Hungary (modern-day Croatia)
- Died: July 8, 1920 (aged 24); Near Rovno, Ukraine
- Military career
- Service years: 1912–1920
- Nickname: Oleko ("Aleksa")
- Conflicts: First World War; October Revolution; Russian Civil War; Southern Front; Battle of Voronezh; Polish Front; Rivne Operation (1920) †
- Awards: Order of the Red Banner

Aleksa Dundić or Oleko Dundich (Russian: Олеко Дундич, Serbo-Croatian: Aleksa Dundić, originally Томо Дундић / Tomo Dundić; April 13, 1896 – July 8, 1920) was a Serbian participant in Russia's October Revolution. A popular character in Russian literature (celebrated for his riding skills and courage), Dundić was honoured with the Order of the Red Banner.

== Biography ==
=== Great Soviet Encyclopedia ===
According to the Great Soviet Encyclopedia (1972 ed.), he was born into a peasant family, in Grabovac, region of Dalmatia (modern-day Croatia) on April 13, 1896. Dundić was of Croatian extraction. In 1914 he was recruited as a private in the Austro-Hungarian Army. During the First World War of 1914–1918 in May, 1916 Dundić was taken prisoner by Russian troops near Lutsk. He volunteered to join the First Division of Serbian Volunteer Corps in Russia (Сербский добровольческий корпус). From the middle of 1917, he was a member of the Red Guard (presumably in Odessa). In March, 1918, he headed a guerrilla squad in the region of Bakhmut that later joined the Morozov-Donetsk division, which retreated together with the army of K.E. Voroshilov towards Tsaritsyn in June 1918. He participated in the defence of Tsaritsyn as a member of an international battalion, then with cavalry brigades of Kryuchkovsky and Bulatkin. From 1919, he served in the Special Don Caucasus Division of Semyon Budyonny (later in the cavalry corps and the First Mounted Army). He was deputy regiment commander, special aide to Semyon Budyonny, commander of mounted division at the headquarters of the First Mounted Army. Dundić took part in numerous battles and he was wounded several times. The legendary courage of Dundić brought him ardent love and popularity among Budyonny's troops. From June 1919 he was the deputy commander of the 36th regiment of the 6th cavalry division. He was killed in battle near Rovno, Ukraine, and awarded the Order of the Red Banner.

=== Other sources ===
According to Zelenin and Sumarokova in 1968, the alleged first biography on Dundić, written by B. V. Agatov in October 1920 (original does not exist), allegedly says that he was born in 1894, in Kruševac, then in the Kingdom of Serbia. Allegedly, his family were cattle breeders. After finishing secondary school, he left home and entered a mechanical school. He then lived in the Americas for two years. In 1912–1913, during the Balkan Wars, he was a weapons technician in the Serbian Army. He then served during the First World War, engaging the Austro-German troops, and for his valour shown during the battles on the Danube, he was promoted to second lieutenant. He was wounded twice, and was captured in 1916, the same year he escaped to Russia where he participated in the formation of the Serbian Volunteer Corps. After the February Revolution, he left the Serbian Corps and entered one of the Cossack regiments. After the October Revolution, he sided with the Soviet government and formed and headed an Odessa Red Guard detachment composed of Serb-internationalists. He fought against the Haidamak and cadet bands. He fought in Voronezh on the Don (in 1918), on the Tsaritsyn Front, and was wounded 16 times, then went to the Polish front. He died on July 8, 1920, at Rovno (now Ukraine). However, as Zelenin and Sumarokova declared, Agatov himself did not indicate the source of the accounts relating to Dundić's life prior to joining the First Cavalry, what makes his story quite unreliable in that segment. It might be a mixture of two or more different biographies, melted in one. E.g., if Dundić, as a "Serb" served in the Austrian army in World War I, he would be a national traitor.

== Legacy ==
In 1958, a joint Yugoslav-Soviet film Aleksa Dundić was directed by Leonid Lukov (Aleksa Dundić at IMDb).

A street in Lviv, Ukraine, was named after him: "Oleko Dundich Street". A street in Sankt Petersburg (Frunzensky District) was named after him as well (ул. Олеко Дундича).

== Annotations ==
His given name was Toma Dundić, according to Great Soviet Encyclopedia, Moscow, 1972.

"Aleksa" was his nickname, presumably derived from Spanish "Alejo" (presumably acquired in Argentina), later in Russian as "Олеко" (Oleko), and later in Croatian and Serbian as "Aleksa".
