= Aleks (footballer) =

Brazilian footballer (born 1991)

Personal information
- Full name: Aleksander Douglas de Faria
- Date of birth: February 20, 1991 (age 35)
- Place of birth: Curitiba, Brazil
- Height: 1.93 m (6 ft 4 in)
- Position: Goalkeeper

Youth career
- 2008–2009: Grêmio
- 2009–2010: Avaí

Senior career*
Years	Team	Apps	(Gls)
2010–2015	Avaí	12	(0)
2013	→ CRAC (loan)	18	(0)
2015	→ Nacional-PR (loan)	12	(0)
2016	Mirassol	0	(0)
2018	Tricordiano	10	(0)
2019–2020	União Frederiquense		

International career
2011	Brazil U-20	1	(0)
- * Club domestic league appearances and goals as of 21:14, 15 March 2021 (UTC)

Aleksander Douglas de Faria, better known as Aleks or Aleksander (born February 20, 1991) is a Brazilian former professional footballer who played as a goalkeeper.

== Career statistics ==
(Correct as of July 7, 2011)

Appearances and goals by club, season and competition
Club	Season	State League		Brazilian Série A		Copa do Brasil		Copa Sudamericana		Total	
Club	Season	Apps	Goals	Apps	Goals	Apps	Goals	Apps	Goals	Apps	Goals
Avaí	2011	—		5	0	—		—		5	0
Total		-	-	5	0	-	-	-	-	5	0

== Honours ==
Brazil youth

- South American Youth Championship: 2011
- FIFA U-20 World Cup: 2011
