= Aleks Vanderpool-Wallace =

Bahamian footballer

Personal information
- Full name: Vincent Samuel Aleksander Vanderpool-Wallace
- Date of birth: 11 May 1988 (age 38)
- Place of birth: Nassau, Bahamas
- Height: 1.73 m (5 ft 8 in)
- Position: Midfielder

Senior career*
Years	Team	Apps	(Gls)
2007–2021	Bears		

International career^{‡}
- Bahamas U20
2011–	Bahamas	3	(0)
- * Club domestic league appearances and goals ‡ National team caps and goals as of 21 May 2016

Vincent Samuel Aleksander Vanderpool-Wallace (born 11 May 1988) is a Bahamian international soccer player who plays for Bears FC and the national team, as a defender.

== International career ==
He earned his first international full cap against the British Virgin Islands on 26 March 2008.

== Personal life ==
He was born in a family of athletes, with his father, a politician, Vincent a high-jumper and pole vaulter and both his mother Tietchka and sister Arianna standing out in swimming with Arianna an Olympic Games participant.
