= A Hill =

A Hill may refer to:

- Aaron Hill (disambiguation), multiple people
- Adin Hill (born 1996), Canadian ice hockey goaltender
- Agnes Leonard Hill (1842–1917), American journalist, author, poet, newspaper founder/publisher, evangelist, social reformer
- Al Hill (disambiguation), multiple people
- Alan Hill (disambiguation), multiple people
- Alban Hill (died 1559), Welsh physician
- Albert Hill (disambiguation), multiple people
- Alec Hill (1916–2008), Australian military historian and academic
- Alex Hill (disambiguation), multiple people
- Alexander Hill (disambiguation), multiple people
- Alex Hyndman Alexandra Hill (born 1978), British journalist and newscaster
- Alexandra Hill Tinoco, Salvadorian politician
- Alexis Hill (disambiguation), multiple people
- Alfred Hill (disambiguation), multiple people
- Alisa Hill (born 1965), American middle-distance runner
- Allen Hill (disambiguation)
- Ally Hill (born 1934), Scottish footballer
- A. P. Hill (Ambrose Powell Hill) (1825–1865), Confederate general in the American Civil War
- Andre Hill (died 2020), African-American man killed by police
- Andrew Hill (disambiguation), multiple people
- Andy Hill (disambiguation), multiple people
- Anita Hill (born 1956), American lawyer, alleged victim of sexual harassment by Clarence Thomas
- Anthony Hill (disambiguation), multiple people
- Antony Hill (disambiguation), multiple people
- Archibald Hill (A. V. Hill) (1886–1977), British Nobel laureate for Physiology or Medicine (1922)
- Arthur Hill (disambiguation), multiple people
- A. T. Hill (Asa Thomas Hill) (1871–1953), American businessman and archaeologist
- Aubrey Hill (1972–2020), American football coach
- Austin Bradford Hill (1897–1991), British epidemiologist and statistician
