= Alex =

Alex is a unisex name, employed either as a hypocoristic or a standalone given name, derived from the Greek element ἀλέξειν (aléxein), meaning "to defend" or "to protect". Universally recognized as a diminutive for Alexander and Alexandra, Alex has, in contemporary usage, established itself as an independent given name for both men and women. Additionally, it is associated with Alexis.

== People ==
=== Politicians ===
- Alex Allan (born 1951), British diplomat
- Alex Attwood (born 1959), Northern Irish politician
- Alex Kushnir (born 1978), Israeli politician
- Alex Madureira (born 1976), Brazilian politician
- Alex Salmond (1954–2024), Scottish politician, former First Minister of Scotland

=== Baseball players ===
- Alex Avila (born 1987), American baseball player
- Alex Bregman (born 1994), American baseball player
- Alex Freeland (born 2001), American baseball player
- Alex Gardner (baseball) (1861–1921), Canadian baseball player
- Alex Katz (baseball) (born 1994), American baseball player
- Alex Pham (born 1999), American baseball player
- Alex Pompez (1890–1974), American executive in Negro league baseball and Major League Baseball scout
- Alex Rodriguez (born 1975), American baseball player
- Alex Santos (baseball) (born 2002), American baseball player

=== American football ===
- Alex Afari (born 2004), Italian-American football player
- Alex Anzalone (born 1994), American football player
- Alex Austin (born 2001), American football player
- Alex Bachman (born 1996), American football player
- Alex Barnes (American football) (born 1996), American football player
- Alex Bars (born 1995), American football player
- Alex Barrett (born 1994), American football player
- Alex Cappa (born 1995), American football player
- Alex Hale, Australian-American football player
- Alex Harkey (born 2001), American football player
- Alex Highsmith (born 1997), American football player
- Alex Hornibrook (born 1997), American football player
- Alex Huntley (born 2001), American football player
- Alex Karras (1935–2012), American football player and actor
- Alex Leatherwood (born 1999), American football player
- Alex Light (born 1996), American football player
- Alex Mack (born 1985), American football player
- Alex McGough (born 1995), American football player
- Alex Orji (born 2003), American football player
- Alex Palczewski (born 1999), American football player
- Alex Redmond (American football) (born 1995), American football player
- Alex Smith (born 1984), American football player
- Alex "Sonny" Styles (born 2004), American football player

=== Association footballers ===
- Alex (footballer, born 1977), full name Alexsandro de Souza, Brazilian footballer
- Alex (footballer, born 1979), full name Domingos Alexandre Martins Costa, Portuguese footballer
- Alex (footballer, born January 1982), full name Alex Henrique da Silva, Armenian-Brazilian footballer
- Alex (footballer, born June 1982), full name Alex Rodrigo Dias da Costa, Brazilian footballer
- Alex (footballer, born 1989), full name Alex Costa dos Santos, Brazilian footballer
- Alex (footballer, born August 1990), full name Alexssander Medeiros de Azeredo, Brazilian footballer
- Alex (footballer, born 1999), full name Alex de Oliveira Nascimento, Brazilian footballer
- Álex Baena, Spanish footballer
- Alex Cazumba (born 1988), Brazilian footballer
- Alex Chidiac (born 1999), Australian footballer
- Alessandro Del Piero (born 1974), Italian footballer
- Alex Ferguson (born 1941), Scottish football manager and player
- Alex Freitas (footballer, born 1988), Brazilian footballer
- Alex Freitas (footballer, born 1991), Portuguese footballer
- Alex Gardner (footballer) (1877–1952), Scottish footballer
- Alex Manninger (1977–2026), Austrian footballer
- Alex Raphael Meschini (born 1982), Brazilian footballer
- Alex Monteiro de Lima (born 1988), Brazilian footballer
- Alex Morgan (born 1989), American women's soccer player
- Alex Oxlade-Chamberlain (born 1993), English footballer
- Álex Pérez (born 1991), Spanish footballer
- Alessandro Santos (born 1977), Brazilian-Japanese international footballer
- Alex Silva (footballer, born 1985), Brazilian footballer
- Alex Stepney (born 1942), English footballer
- Alex Whittle (born 1993), English footballer

=== Basketball players ===
- Alex Caruso (born 1994), American basketball player
- Alex English (born 1954), American basketball player
- Alex Fowler (born 2001), Australian basketball player
- Alex Karaban (born 2002), American basketball player
- Alex King (basketball) (born 1985), German basketball player
- Alex Len (born 1993), Ukrainian basketball player
- Alex Poythress (born 1993), American-Ivorian basketball player
- Alex Reese (born 1999), American basketball player
- Alex Sarr (born 2005), French basketball player
- Alex Toohey (born 2004), Australian basketball player
- Alex Tyus (born 1988), American-Israeli basketball player

=== Boxers ===
- Alex Arthur (born 1978), British boxer
- Alex Obeysekere (1918–2002), Sri Lankan boxer

=== Motorsports ===
- Alex Albon (born 1996), Thai racing driver
- Alex Guenette (born 1996), Canadian racing driver
- Alex Labbé (born 1993), Canadian racing driver
- Alex Sedgwick (born 1999), British racing driver
- Alex Zanardi (1966–2026), Italian racing driver and paracyclist

=== Other sports ===
- Alex Asensi (born 1984), Norwegian table tennis player
- Alex Auld (born 1981), Canadian ice hockey player
- Alex Breton (born 1997), Canadian ice hockey player
- Alex Carpenter (born 1994), American ice hockey player
- Alex Chu (born 1992), American professional gamer, usually known by his in-game name Xpecial
- Alex Eala (born 2005), Filipino tennis player
- Alex Decoteau (1887–1917), Cree Canadian track and field athlete, police officer and soldier.
- Alex Glenn (born 1988), New Zealand rugby league player
- Alex Hall (born 1998), American freestyle skier
- Alex Honnold (born 1985), American rock climber
- Alex Koslov, ring name of Alex Sherman (born 1984), a Moldovan-born professional wrestler
- Alex Masai (born 1997), Kenyan long-distance runner
- Alex Ovechkin (born 1985), Russian ice hockey player and captain for the Washington Capitals
- Alex Pierzchalski (born 1991), Canadian football player
- Alex Pietrangelo (born 1990), Canadian ice hockey player
- Alex Schlopy (born 1992), American skier
- Alex Sedrick (born 1998), American women's rugby sevens player
- Alex Tracy (born 2001), American ice hockey player
- Alex Tripolski (born 1962), Israeli Olympic sport shooter, and President of the Israel Curling Federation
- Alex Welsh (cyclist) (born 1991), Australian para-cyclist

=== Arts and entertainment ===
- Alex (actor) (1959–2011), Indian actor and magician
- Alex (singer) (born 1978), Danish singer
- Alex Aronson (author) (1912–1995), German-born Israeli author and educator
- Alex Avery (born 1971), English actor
- Alex Borstein (born 1972), American actress
- Alex Brooker (born 1984), British journalist and presenter of The Last Leg
- Alex Bulmer, Canadian playwright and theatre artist
- Alex Castro (born 1985), Filipino actor and Vice Governor of Bulacan
- Alex Chilton (1950–2010), American singer-songwriter, guitarist, the lead singer of the Box Tops
- Alex Chu (born 1979), Korean-Canadian singer of Clazziquai
- Alex Consani (born 2003), American model and influencer
- Alex Day (born 1989), English musician
- Alex Gaskarth (born 1987), American lead singer of All Time Low
- Alex Gonzaga (born 1988), Filipino actress, comedian, and YouTuber
- Alex Harvey (musician) (1935–1982), British rock musician
- Alex Hills (born 1974), English composer
- Alex Hood (born 1935), Australian folk musician
- Alex Horne (born 1978), English comedian and musician
- Alex James (musician) (born 1968), British bass player for Blur
- Alex Jolig (born 1963), German actor, singer and motorcycle racer
- Alex Jovanovich (born 1975), American artist and writer
- Alex Kingston (born 1963), English actress
- Alex Koehler (born 1991), American vocalist for Chelsea Grin
- Alex Lifeson, stage name for Canadian musician Alexandar Zivojinovich (born 1953), a guitarist for Rush
- Alex Mahan (born 1988), American video game developer
- Alex Vincent Medina (born 1986), Filipino film actor
- Alex O'Loughlin (born 1976), Australian actor
- Alex Russell (actor) (born 1987), Australian actor
- Alex Sauser-Monnig, American singer
- Alex Sharpe (fl. 1991–present), Irish singer
- Alex Trebek (1940–2020), Canadian-American host of the game show Jeopardy!
- Alex Turner (musician) (born 1986), British guitarist and lead singer of Arctic Monkeys
- Alex Van Halen (born 1953), Dutch drummer for Van Halen
- Alex Vargas (born 1988), Danish singer
- Alex Wenham, English stone carver
- Alex Winter (born 1965), British-American actor
- Eliza Orne White (1856–1947), American author who wrote under the pen-name 'Alex'

=== Other ===
- Alex Aïnouz (born 1982), French culinary YouTuber
- Alex Aronson (1934–1975), Dutch aid worker
- Alex Azar (born 1967), American government official and lawyer
- Alex Balfanz (born 1999), American video game developer
- Alex Bartolome (1958–2000), Filipino rapist, last person executed in the Philippines
- Alex Ferrer (born 1960), a Cuban-born judge currently residing in Miami, Florida
- Alex Konanykhin (born 1966), Russian entrepreneur and former banker
- Alex McCool (1923–2020), American NASA manager
- Alex Pretti (1988–2026), American nurse killed by United States Border Patrol agents
- Alex Schachter (2003–2018), one of the 17 victims who was killed in the Stoneman Douglas High School shooting
- Alex Chen Stokes (born 1996), American internet celebrity
- Alex Wagner (born 1977), American journalist

=== Multiple ===
- Alex Brown (disambiguation), multiple people
- Alex Cook (disambiguation), multiple people
- Alex Forsyth (disambiguation), multiple people
- Alex Gordon (disambiguation), multiple people
- Alex Harris (disambiguation), multiple people
- Alex Jones (disambiguation), multiple people
- Alex Lee (disambiguation), multiple people
- Alex Padilla (disambiguation), multiple people
- Alex Taylor (disambiguation), multiple people

== Others ==
- Alex (parrot) (1976–2007), an African Grey Parrot and the subject of language experiments
- Alex the Great (rabbit) (2020–2025), popular rabbit known simply as Alex

== Fictional characters ==
- Alex (A Clockwork Orange)
- Alex (Power Rangers)
- Alex (Street Fighter)
- Alex (Totally Spies)
- Alex Archer, character in the 1987–1992 Alex series of young adult novels by New Zealand novelist Tessa Duder
- Alex Browning, a character from Final Destination
- Alex Cross, from the Alex Cross novel and film series
- Alex Fierro, from the Magnus Chase and the Gods of Asgard novels by Rick Riordan
- Alex P. Keaton, a character on the United States TV sitcom Family Ties
- Alex the Lion, from the Madagascar animated films and franchise
- Alex Louis Armstrong, the state alchemist from Fullmetal Alchemist
- Alex Masterley, the title character in Alex (comic strip)
- Alex Millar (Being Human)
- Alex Rider (character), from the Alex Rider novels by Anthony Horowitz
- Alex, the second of nine player skins added to Minecraft
- Alex Vause, a character in the television series Orange Is the New Black

== See also ==
- Alexander
- Alexandra (disambiguation)
- Allex (disambiguation)
- Aleks
- Alec
