= Alexx =

Alexx is a unisex (though more often masculine) given name, a variant of the name Alexander, which means 'defending men'. Notable people with the given name or nickname include:

- Alexx Calise (born 1985), American singer, songwriter, and musician
- Alexx Ekubo (1986–2026), Nigerian actor, entertainer, and humanitarian
- Alexx O'Nell (born 1980), American actor and musician

== See also ==
- Alex
- Allex (disambiguation)
