= Alexandra Hill =

Alexandra Hill may refer to:

== People ==
- Alex Hyndman, British journalist
- Alexandra Hill Tinoco, Salvadorian politician

== Places ==
- Alexandra Hill, Singapore
- Alexandra Hills, Queensland

== See also ==
- Al Hill (disambiguation)
- Alex Hill (disambiguation)
- Alexander Hill (disambiguation)
- Hill (surname)
