= Alexandra, Singapore =

Coordinates: 1.2868°N 103.7963°E

Alexandra
- Subzone of Bukit Merah Planning Area

Name transcription(s)
  - Chinese: 亚历山大
  - Hokkien POJ: A-lek-san-tāi
  - Malay: Alexandra
  - Tamil: அலெக்சாண்ட்ரா
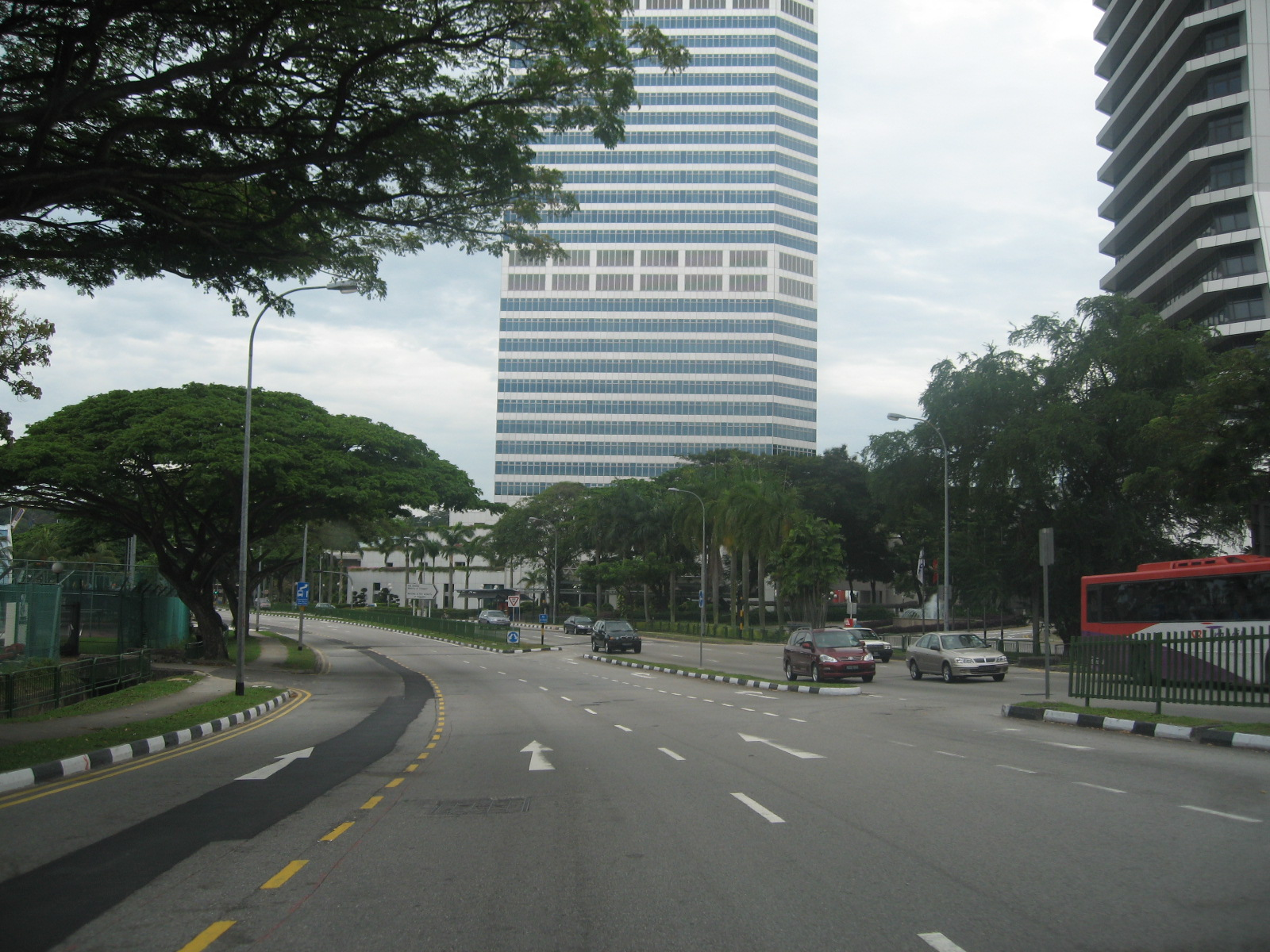
- Alexandra Road, Singapore

- Location of Alexandra within Singapore
- Country: Singapore

Alexandra is a subzone region located in the town of Bukit Merah, Singapore. The region consists of two non contiguous neighbourhoods: Alexendra Hill and Alexendra North. It is located along the road which the place had its name derived from, at the eastern border of the Queenstown district.

Alexandra North, which refers to the precinct near Redhill MRT station, consists mainly of condominiums together with a park. Alexandra Hill, which is often referred to as Brickworks Estate or Rumah Tinggi, mainly consists of HDB flats and is also home to an IKEA showroom. There is also a shopping centre in the district which recently opened its doors in 2016, Alexandra Central, beside the IKEA building.

== Etymology ==
The area derives its name from Queen Alexandra.

== Amenities ==
Hospitals

- Alexandra Hospital

== Notable places ==
- Depot Road Zhen Shan Mei Claypot Laksa, food stall awarded Michelin Bib Gourmand in 2016.

== See also ==
- Kim Seng Road
