= Alex Hill =

Alex Hill may refer to:

- Alex Hill (musician) (1906–1937), American jazz pianist
- Alex Kedoh Hill (born 1990), lacrosse player
- Alex Hyndman (born 1978), or Alexandra Hill, British broadcast journalist

== See also ==
- Al Hill (disambiguation)
- Alexander Hill (disambiguation)
- Alexandra Hill (disambiguation)
- Alex Hills (born 1974), English composer of contemporary classical music
- Hill (surname)
