= List of killings by law enforcement officers in the United States, March 2015 =

This is a list of people reported killed by non-military law enforcement officers in the United States in March 2015, whether in the line of duty or not, and regardless of reason or method. The listing documents the occurrence of a death, making no implications regarding wrongdoing or justification on the part of the person killed or officer involved. Killings are arranged by date of the incident that caused death. Different death dates, if known, are noted in the description. The table below lists 112 people.

== March 2015 ==
Date	Name (Age) of Deceased	Race	State (City)	Description
2015-03-31	Tyrail Ezell (31)	Black	Tennessee (Nashville)	
2015-03-31	Benjamin Quezada (21)	Hispanic	Texas (Baytown)	Baytown Police responded to call just after midnight of a man standing in an intersection with a weapon. When officers arrived they found Quezada carrying a pellet gun. He did not drop the weapon as ordered and when he turned pointed it at an officer he was killed with a shotgun.
2015-03-31	Jeremy James Anderson (36)	White	Florida (Tampa)	Anderson was killed by members of a task force of United States Marshals and Tampa Police who were trying to arrest him on multiple warrants. Gunfire was exchanged inside the house where Anderson was staying.
2015-03-31	Phillip White (32)	Black	New Jersey (Vineland)	Residents on the 100 block of Grape Street called police after seeing a man acting strange on the sidewalk. When officers Louis Platania and Richard Janasiak responded to the disorderly conduct call, the situation escalated and 32-year-old Philip White was arrested then taken to the hospital in 'respiratory distress' where he was pronounced dead. In the days following the incident, a video from an eye-witness emerged showing one of the officers on Mr White's back before a police dog is called over. The Officers allow the dog to attack Mr White while the officer on his back continues to punch. The dog is allowed to maul the unconscious body of Mr White, biting and tearing several times on his head, neck and arms while he lay in the road. The video did not show how Mr White came to be in the road.
2015-03-30	Brian Avon Babb (49)	White	Oregon (Eugene)	The therapist of a troubled veteran called 911. Officers responded by driving an armored vehicle onto his property. Babb allegedly shouldered an unloaded rifle and officers shot the man dead.
2015-03-30	Dominick R. Wise (30)	Black	Virginia (Culpeper)	Culpeper Police responded to reports of a man walking in circles in the middle of the street. When an officer talked to him he fled. He was tased more than once and several officers subdued him and put him in handcuffs. After paramedics arrived he became unresponsive and soon died at a hospital. The Medical Examiner in Manassas, Virginia attributed the accidental death to heart arrhythmia due to PCP intoxication, restraint and exertion, and the taser.
2015-03-30	Maya Hall (Ricky Shawatza Hall) (27)	Black	Maryland (Fort Meade)	Hall and a companion Fleming were driving an SUV they had recently stolen from a third companion. In an apparent error of navigation, they took an exit restricted to NSA employees but refused police commands to stop, possibly because they had drugs inside the vehicle. Police fired on the vehicle, which then crashed into a cruiser. Hall died at the scene.
2015-03-29	Moland, Jason (29)		California (Modesto)	An off-duty police officer and a woman were at a park when they were approached by Mr. Moland, and a confrontation ensued. Mr. Moland brandished a weapon, and the officer shot him. Later the brandished weapon was identified as a BB gun.
2015-03-29	John Marcel Allen (54)	White	Nevada (Boulder City)	Boulder City Police officers, responding to a call of shots fired, encountered Allen outside his apartment building. When he shot at them police returned fire, killing him.
2015-03-29	Byron Hebert (29)	Black	Kentucky (Elizabethtown)	Responding to a disturbance at a store parking lot, an officer confronted Mr. Herbert who was assaulting a woman and brandishing a handgun. Gunfire was exchanged and the suspect was fatally shot.
2015-03-28	Robert Rooker (26)	White	Ohio (Latham)	Pike County Sheriff Deputies attempted to pull over Rooker for speeding. Deputies say that when Rooker used his vehicle to ram and to attempt to ram their cars, they shot and killed him. Deputy Joel Jenkins was indicted for manslaughter and reckless homicide.
2015-03-28	Meagan Hockaday (26)	Black	California (Oxnard)	Responding to a 911 call of a domestic dispute, two Oxnard police officers went to an apartment about 1 a.m. While an officer was talking with Hokaday's boyfriend, who had made the call, Hockaday approached the two with a knife. The officer shot and killed Hockaday.
2015-03-27	Gary Kendrick (56)	White	California (Encinitas)	A 56-year-old Encinitas man was shot and killed by a San Diego County sheriff's deputy Friday.
2015-03-27	Adrian Hernandez (23)	Hispanic	California (Bakersfield)	A crime-spree-filled day ended in a police shoot-out in which Hernandez was killed.
2015-03-27	Pope, Aaron (34)		Ohio (Toledo)	Police responded to a call of Pope acting out of control. Family members said police used too much force when they were detaining the unarmed man, by putting pressure on his chest including an officer holding him down with his knees. Police did not call for an ambulance but transported Pope to the hospital themselves, where he was pronounced dead.
2015-03-27	Harvey E. Oates (42)	White	West Virginia (Fort Ashby)	West Virginia State Troopers received a call about a distraught man in possession of a gun. When an officer attempted a traffic stop the suspect fled his vehicle and ran into the woods with his gun, threatening to shoot officers and himself. After a ninety-minute standoff Oates moved toward the officers and pointed his gun at them. A trooper shot and killed him.
2015-03-27	Jamalis Hall (39)	Black	Florida (Fort Pierce)	Hall was wanted on a murder warrant when he was pulled over by a task force including officers from St. Lucie County Sheriff's office. He was lying on the floor of the van and when he reached for a knife he was shot and killed.
2015-03-27	Neil Seifert (40)	White	Massachusetts (Webster)	Webster Police responding to a domestic disturbance call learned that Seifert had left the scene in his girlfriend's car. When he returned to his girlfriend's home he had a shotgun which he fired at police. They returned fire, killing him.
2015-03-27	Angelo West (41)	Black	Massachusetts (Roxbury)	Boston Police gang unit officers investigating a report of shots fired pulled over a vehicle carrying three men. The suspect stepped out of the car and fled, firing his gun at the officers. One officer was shot in the face. The other officers returned fire, killing Angelo West. The wounded officer was in critical condition at a hospital.
2015-03-26	Adrian Solis (35)	Hispanic	California (Los Angeles)	Two Los Angeles Police officers responded to a call of a suicidal man in the Wilmington neighborhood. They arrived to find a man bleeding from a deep cut in his neck. When the paramedics arrived, one officer went outside to direct them, leaving one officer with the subject. Solis jumped up, grabbed two kitchen knives, and approached the officer who had remained. The officer went outside, followed by Solis who continued to advance. An officer shot and killed Solis.
2015-03-26	Deanne Choate (53)	White	Kansas (Gardner)	Police were called to a home by a man who said a woman had discharged a handgun inside the home. When they arrived the woman was in bed. The two officers handcuffed the man and put him into their car. They then went into the room and within a few minutes the man heard several gunshots. The officers had shot and killed the woman. Johnson County District Attorney decided that the officers were justified in shooting the woman.
2015-03-26	Smith, Gregory Thomas Joseph (39)		Indiana (Crown Point)	Smith was being transferred between areas of the Lake County Jail when he had an outburst. Officers used a taser to stun him and he went into cardiac arrest. He was pronounced dead at a hospital.
2015-03-25	Victor Daniel Terrazas (28)	Hispanic	California (Los Angeles)	Los Angeles County Sheriff deputies in an unincorporated area of Los Angeles were investigating the murder of a woman when about 1:30 am they found Terrazas in a nearby alley. He was armed with a shotgun and fired upon the deputies who then shot and killed him.
2015-03-25	Jeremy L. Kelly (27)	Black	South Carolina (Johnsonville)	Florence County Sheriffs deputies responding to a call of shots fired encountered Kelly in the woods near the scene. The Sheriff's SWAT team also arrived and tried to negotiate with Kelly. About one hour after the original call Kelly pointed a weapon at the officers and they fired, killing him.
2015-03-24	Walter Brown III (29)	Black	Virginia (Portsmouth)	An officer fatally shot a drug suspect who fled when police attempted to question him. Police allege he nearly struck a detective with his vehicle as he fled. Police caught up with Brown, and after using a Taser twice, Brown produced a gun and was shot by a responding officer.
2015-03-24	Nicholas Thomas (23)	Black	Georgia (Smyrna)	Sgt. Kenneth Owens tried to serve Thomas with an arrest warrant for parole violation. Officers say Thomas got into a customer's car and tried to run them over rather than be arrested, so Owens shot Thomas.
2015-03-24	Joseph Tassinari (63)	White	Arizona (Glendale)	After allegedly brandishing a firearm in a verbal exchange with a couple at an ATM, Tassinari was traced to his home and confronted by police. He allegedly reached for a weapon in his waistband and was both tazered and then shot dead by an officer.
2015-03-24	Scott Dunham (57)	White	California (San Jose)	Three officers responded to a call of a threatening incident at Dunham's apartment. Upon approaching the building, Dunham opened fire killing one officer. Return gunfire killed Dunham on his balcony.
2015-03-24	Steven Timothy Snyder (38)	White	Wisconsin (Fond du Lac)	Snyder, suspected of a bank robbery, was apparently shot and killed in a shootout with State Trooper Trevor Casper (21). Snyder's shots also killed Trooper Casper in the exchange of gunfire.
2015-03-22	Christopher R. Healy (36)	White	Oregon (Portland)	Portland Police officers were responding to a burglary call and found Healey who had tried to run from the resident. When he refused to lie down as ordered and instead advanced toward the officers with a knife in his hand the police shot and killed him.
2015-03-22	Enoch Gaver (21)	White	Arizona (Cottonwood)	Up to nine suspects were reportedly assaulting a woman at a Walmart store. As officers arrived on scene, at least one of the men fired at the officers in the store parking lot, wounding one in the leg. One suspect was shot dead, and another was wounded in the stomach. Seven other officers received injuries while arresting the men.
2015-03-22	Allen, Alissa (24)		New Jersey (Bridgeton)	Allen was arrested for a 2012 warrant alleging shoplifting. She was held at Cumberland County Jail in Bridgeton, NJ. After two days in jail, Allen was found dead in her cell. Allen's death is being investigated by the Cumberland County Prosecutor.
2015-03-22	Denzel Brown (21)	Black	New York (Islip)	A Suffolk County Police officer investigating a shoplifting was directed by a witness to where the suspect was hiding outside the store. When the suspect climbed into an occupied car and tried to drive away the officer reached into the car to try to put the car into park, but was unable to stop the suspect. During the chase the officer had tried to tase Brown but the taser was ineffective. Finally the officer shot Brown once. He was able to keep driving but was soon other officers were able to take him into custody. Brown was taken to a hospital where he died.
2015-03-21	Devin J. Gates (24)	Black	California (Santa Clara)	At 2 am, a robbery suspect, Devin Gates, was fatally shot by two police officers after he tried robbing a 7-11 store and fired a shot at the clerk, missing. The gunman walked out the store and was shot by officers.
2015-03-21	Richard White (63)	Black	Louisiana (New Orleans)	At the New Orleans International Airport, White sprayed several TSA agents with insecticide and attempted to attack them with a machete. He was shot by a deputy and died one day later.
2015-03-21	Philip Conley (37)	White	California (Vallejo)	Conley held a knife and displayed a fake gun in his waistband when he confronted a Vallejo police officer in a parking lot. The man refused to drop the knife as ordered. When he came toward the officer he was shot and killed. The man left in his vehicle a note to his family apologizing for the trouble he put police through.
2015-03-21	Gary Page (60)	White	Indiana (Harmony)	Clay County Sheriff Deputies responded to a 911 call from Page who requested officers come to his residence and shoot him. When deputies arrived Clay pointed a firearm at them and at bystanders. They shot him and then gave first aid until an ambulance transported him to a hospital where he died.
2015-03-21	Jason L. Smith (42)	White	Ohio (Columbus)	A Columbus Police Officer was at a home taking a report about threats made against one of the residents, when the suspect returned to the home. The suspect immediately attacked the officer and a struggle ensued. When the suspect, Jason L. Smith, reached for his own firearm the officer shot and killed him.
2015-03-21	James J. Ellis (44)	White	New York (Holley)	An Orleans County Sheriff Deputy responding to a domestic disturbance call spotted the suspect's car driving at a high speed on Route 31A. The car got away but was later found crashed. The deputy arrived at the scene and found Ellis in the woods where Ellis shot and twice hit the deputy's bulletproof vest. The deputy returned fire, killing Ellis. The deputy was taken to a hospital where he was treated and released.
2015-03-20	Justin Fowler (24)	Native American	Arizona (Navajo Nation)	Fowler was reported to have been assaulting relatives at a home in Shiprock, New Mexico. Fowler lead officers on a car chase into Arizona which ended with a shootout that killed a tribal police officer, Fowler, and wounded two other officers
2015-03-20	Tyrel W. Vick (34)	White	Oklahoma (Coal County)	Vick was a suspect in the murder of his brother Naman Wade Vick (39). When Oklahoma Highway Patrol officers spotted his vehicle they chased it until it crashed. Tyrel Vick fired a gun at the officers and the officers returned fire, killing him.
2015-03-19	Jamison Childress (20)	White	Washington (Sumas)	When he was discovered by two Border Patrol agents Childress sprayed them with some type of "chemical irritant." . One of the agents shot and killed him. He was wanted for a homicide in Canada.
2015-03-19	Brandon Jones (18)	Black	Ohio (Cleveland)	Two officers responded to a call of an early morning break-in at a grocery store. On arrival, they found Jones walking out of the store with a bag containing cigarettes and Canadian coins. A struggle ensued as officers tried to arrest him, and after officers wrestled him to the ground, Jones was fatally shot. He was unarmed.
2015-03-19	Adam Jovicic (29)	White	Ohio (Munroe Falls)	Off-duty Kent, Ohio police officer Sara Berkey called 911 to report that she shot her boyfriend Jovicic after he broke into her home and beat her. He died of the two gunshot wounds.
2015-03-19	Robert P. Burdge (36)	White	California (Bakersfield)	After shooting another man in an apparent love triangle, Robert Burdge, a former Department of Corrections employee, fled to a motel and barricaded himself in the lobby. Bakersfield police officers followed Burdge from the original shooting scene to the motel and attempted negotiations with him. They lost contact with him and about ten minutes later shot him. He was airlifted to a hospital where he died.
2015-03-19	Shane Watkins (39)	White	Alabama (Langtown)	Watkins was reportedly having a schizophrenic episode when he called police reporting that his mother was trying to kill him. When Lawrence County Sheriffs Deputies responded they encountered Watkins in front of the residence holding a box cutter. Authorities say the deputies shot and killed Watkins when he charged at them.
2015-03-19	Kendre Alston (16)	Black	Florida (Jacksonville)	A Jacksonville Police officer chased the suspect from a stolen car which had crashed during a chase. The driver pointed his gun at the officer, then turned and ran. The office fired at the driver and then chased him. When he was found the driver crouched down facing the officer, who then shot and killed him.
2015-03-18	Kaylene Stone (49)	White	Arizona (Peoria)	Undercover officers from the Glendale, Arizona Police Department were following a vehicle in which Stone was a passenger. She was wanted on a drug warrant. When the vehicle stopped at a convenience store and the driver went inside the officers approached the vehicle where Stone and a male passenger remained. Stone had a handgun and did not drop it as ordered. The officers fired at least a dozen shots and Stone was pronounced dead at a local hospital.
2015-03-18	Brandon Rapp (31)	White	Idaho (Middleton)	A Canyon County, Idaho Sheriff deputy responded to a domestic disturbance call. The deputy says a man emerged from the residence and pointed a pistol him. The deputy fired several shots, killing Rapp.
2015-03-18	Garland L. Wingo (64)	White	Florida (Tallahassee)	At approximately 6:50pm a TPD officer responded to a report of a white male armed with a weapon at a local park. An interaction took place and the TPD officer discharged his weapon, striking Wingo. Wingo died at the scene.
2015-03-17	Andrew Charles Shipley (49)	White	Oregon (Medford)	Medford Police responded when Shipley's sister called to ask for help because of his mental health problems. His sister escaped the house and police surrounded it the afternoon of Monday, March 16. After a nineteen-hour standoff Shipley fired a shot from inside the house. When a few minutes later he opened the garage door and fired again, the officers shot and killed him.
2015-03-17	Askari Roberts (35)	Black	Georgia (Floyd County)	Roberts became unresponsive after a stun gun was used directly on his skin. He began struggling with officers when they responded to his parents' home for a domestic dispute and assault that may have been substance-abuse related.
2015-03-17	Eugene Frank Smith II (20)	White	Texas (Onalaska)	Onalaska Police responded to a call of a man with a shotgun at a convenience store. When the first officer arrived Smith fired at her. She and two other officers shot Smith who died at a hospital in Livingston, Texas.
2015-03-17	Roberto Jose Leon (22)	Hispanic	California (Sacramento)	About 3 p.m. Leon was on a motorcycle fleeing from the California Highway Patrol officer, also on a motorcycle. When he was stopped, Leon ran away and attempted to highjack an SUV stopped at an intersection. While Leon was struggling with the SUV driver, the CHP officer fearing Leon was reaching for a weapon in his backpack, fired his weapon and hit Leon several times. Leon got away but he police later learned he was hiding in his home in the Natomas community of Sacramento. Law enforcement from several agencies surrounded the home and called for Police and Sheriffs SWAT. About 7 p.m., with the aid for a robot, the officers searched the home. Leon was found dead.
2015-03-17	Alice Brown (24)	White	California (San Francisco)	Brown was shot by police after she allegedly drove erratically and tried to hit motorists on a street in the Van Ness area. She was shot by two plainclothes officers.
2015-03-17	Jeff Alexander (47)	White	California (Bakersfield)	Bakersfield Police were called by a report of a knife-wielding man in a downtown hotel. Police arrived and entered the hotel. Witnesses heard the police officer telling Alexander to put down the knife before they heard gunshots. Police officials identified Nestor Barajas as the officer who shot and killed Alexander.
2015-03-17	Declan Owen (24)	White	North Carolina (Dublin)	Responding to a call reporting a man with a gun, officers from the Bladen County Sheriff's Office and the Bladenboro Police Department pulled over the vehicle he was riding in. Owen ran into the woods and police set up a perimeter. After a search officers found him lying on his back facing the road with his head propped up against a tree. Officers say he refused their orders show his hands and when he pointed a gun at them they shot and killed him. The District Attorney found the shooting to be justified.
2015-03-16	Sheldon Paul Haleck (38)	Native Hawaiian or Pacific Islander	Hawaii (Honolulu)	A man in dark clothing was seen acting erratically in the middle of a road. Responding officers tasered and pepper sprayed him before physically subduing him at which point he became unresponsive and later died.
2015-03-16	Justin Todd Tolkinen (28)	White	Minnesota (Saint Paul)	Tolkinen was shot by police after called to an address on the East Side. Tolkinen was brandishing a rifle and appeared to be wearing a bullet-proof vest. Attempts were made by police negotiators. Beanbag rounds were used before the live rounds.
2015-03-16	William Dean Poole (52)	White	North Carolina (Gastonia)	When William Dean Poole placed a suicidal call to a veteran's hotline four officers from Gaston County Police responded. Police found Poole, armed with a handgun, outside his home. When he fired his weapon multiple times, police shot and killed him.
2015-03-15	Troy Ray Boyd (27)	White	Mississippi (Ruth)	A Pike County Sheriff Deputy was responding to a report of a man with a machete riding a four-wheel ATV. In an attempt to stop Boyd at a roadblock, Deputy Terry Beadle fired his weapon at Boyd who crashed and was pronounced dead at the scene. Beadle, who says Boyd was trying to run over him, was indicted for manslaughter.
2015-03-15	David Werblow (41)	White	Connecticut (Branford)	Branford Police officers responding to a disturbance call found Werblow sitting in a parked vehicle that was not his. Police say he was uncooperative and they used a Taser to force him to exit the vehicle but when they had handcuffed him they realized he was in "medical distress." Police called an ambulance to take him to a hospital where he was pronounced dead.
2015-03-14	Richard Castilleja (29)	Hispanic	Texas (San Antonio)	Richard Castilleja was involved in a bar fight to which San Antonio Police officers were called. Officers found him and Desiree Castilleja (26) outside the bar. An officer saw Castilleja shoot at the people outside the bar; the officer then shot and mortally wounded Castilleja. Two bar customers were wounded by Richard Castilleja. Desiree Castilleja was arrested.
2015-03-14	Aaron Siler (26)	White	Wisconsin (Kenosha)	A Kenosha Police officer chased a car driven by Siler who was wanted on a warrant. Siler crashed his car and ran from the scene. Siler armed himself with an empty bucket; the officer shot Siler six times, killing him. The Kenosha County District Attorney ruled the shooting justified.
2015-03-13	Salome Rodriguez Jr. (23)	Hispanic	California (Ontario)	Rodriguez was on his way home at approximately 3:30 a.m. when he was shot five times. Rodriguez ran about a block to a parking lot where a friend was located, and then collapsed. He was transported to LA County - USC Medical Center, where he died. The shooting was not reported, but the alleged shooter was Henry Solis, a probationary officer who did not return to work. Solis was fired, and fled to Mexico. As of May 20, the FBI posted a $25K reward for information leading to the Solis's arrest.
2015-03-13	James Richard Jimenez (41)	Hispanic	California (Napa)	Jimenez allegedly tried to pull a gun on an officer while he was on his motorcycle fleeing from police. He was shot three times, with one round striking him in the torso.
2015-03-13	Andrew Driver (36)	White	California (Fontana)	Driver made several calls to dispatch threatening to kill Fontana officers with a knife. When police located Driver, who was armed with a knife, he attacked them. An officer shot him. He died at a local hospital.
2015-03-13	Fred E. Liggett Jr. (59)	White	Missouri (Kansas City)	A United States Marshals task force entering a home to serve an arrest warrant encountered Liggett, who was armed. A task force member shot and killed him.
2015-03-13	Clifton Daniel Reintzel (53)	White	West Virginia (Follansbee)	West Virginia State Police responded to a 911 call about a man cutting himself with a knife. When the officers entered, Reintzel charged them, threatening them with the knife. The officers shot him and he died later at a hospital.
2015-03-12	Bobby Gross (35)	Black	Washington, D.C.	Gross was trespassing in a Metro station tunnel and partially clothed when he was encountered by a police officer. Gross allegedly had a tree branch and brandished at the officer. The officer fired and killed Gross.
2015-03-12	Antonio Perez (32)	Hispanic	California (Los Angeles)	Los Angeles County Sheriff deputies, searching for a stolen car, found it had crashed. Perez ran from the vehicle and when deputies found him, he reached into his waistband. A deputy shot and killed him. No weapon was found. The Los Angeles County District Attorney found the shooting justified.
2015-03-11	James Greenwell (31)	White	Tennessee (Memphis)	Greenwell's father called police to tell them his son was drinking, had a mental illness, and already opened fire inside of the house. As police tried to get Greenwell to surrender while he sat on the front porch of his parents' home with a gun, they say he pointed his gun at the officers and opened fire. Three officers returned fire, fatally shooting Greenwell.
2015-03-11	Aaron Valdez (25)	Hispanic	California (South Gate)	South Gate police officers shot and killed Valdez as he drove his car toward them. They were questioning a man detained in an unrelated incident. They believed they were in danger from Valdez's vehicle.
2015-03-11	Benito Osorio (39)	Hispanic	California (Santa Ana)	Santa Ana police officers, responding to a report of someone shooting from a white Toyota pickup. Officers encountered such a truck and followed it until the driver stopped, but refused to get out. The driver, Benito Osorio, eventually shot himself and then exited the vehicle still holding the gun. Police shot and killed him. The Coroner's autopsy ruled the cause of death to be not the self-inflicted gunshot wound, but the other nine gunshot wounds.
2015-03-11	Ryan Dean Burgess (31)	White	Arizona (Kingman)	Kingman Police officers responding to a domestic disturbance call saw Burgess exiting the front door carrying an automatic pistol and pointing it at one of the officers. The other officer told Burgess to drop the weapon and then shot and killed him. The weapon was a CO2 powered replica of a Colt 1911 automatic.
2015-03-11	Gilbert Fleury (54)	White	Alabama (Bay Minette)	Baldwin County Sheriff Deputies responding to reports of a disturbance with shots fired encountered Fleury as they approached the home. Deputies say that Fleury pointed a shotgun at one of them. That deputy opened fire, killing Fleury.
2015-03-11	Terry Garnett Jr. (37)	Black	Maryland (Elkton)	A Cecil County Sheriff's Deputy was attempting to make a traffic stop of Garnett. Garnett turned onto a crossroad and drove back toward the deputy, who fired multiple rounds at him. Garnett crashed into a tree and died at the scene.
2015-03-10	Edixon Ivan Franco (37)	Hispanic	California (Ontario)	Franco called Ontario police about 10 p.m. reporting he was suicidal. They found his vehicle and attempted to pull him over. After a brief chase they stopped his vehicle and he exited, coming at the police with a sword. They shot him with rubber bullets and when that did not stop him, they shot and killed him.
2015-03-10	Jamie Croom (31)	Black	Louisiana (East Baton Rouge)	Croom was being sought for shooting and killing two people when a task force of United States Marshals found him at a motel. As the Deputy Marshals tried to arrest him he engaged the officers in a gun battle. Croom killed one officer and was himself shot multiple in the confrontation. He died Wednesday, 11 March at a local hospital.
2015-03-10	William Russell Smith (53)	White	Alabama (Hoover)	Hoover Police officers were investigating a domestic dispute. When they arrived neighbors described the vehicles in which three of the people concerned had left the home. Police found those three and questioned them. The police then returned to the home to try to talk to Smith, the fourth person involved. When the officers encountered Smith he was armed and two of the officer shot and killed him.
2015-03-10	Theodore Johnson (64)	Black	Ohio (Cleveland)	When a woman came into a Cleveland District Police Station reporting her partner was threatening her with a gun, Cleveland Police officers responded. Four officers entered the building and went up the stairs toward Johnson's residence. When they encountered Johnson on the stairs he fired his forty-five caliber pistol twice, striking the bulletproof vest of one officer. Officers went back down the stairs and told him to drop his pistol. When he refused and raised the weapon the officers fired at least five shots, killing him. The officer whose vest took a bullet was treated and released at a medical facility.
2015-03-10	Moxley, Terrance (29)		Ohio (Mansfield)	When Moxley became agitated, violent, and incoherent at a halfway house, Mansfield Police officers were called. The officers were able to calm him down and handcuff him, but when they tried to put him into their car he again became violent. They tased him multiple times, At some point in the struggle he appeared to be in medical distress. He was taken to a hospital where he was pronounced dead. The coroner said the cause of death was a reaction to ab-chiminaca, a synthetic cannabinoid which explained his sudden cardiac arrest.
2015-03-10	Christopher Mitchell (23)	White	Georgia (Port Wentworth)	Port Wentworth Police responding to a call of a stabbing at a mobile home park found two stabbing victims and suspect Christopher Mitchell, still armed with a knife. Mitchell stabbed one of the officers but the officer's bulletproof vest deflected the blade. One or more of the officers shot and killed Mitchell.
2015-03-09	Lester Randolph Brown (58)	White	North Carolina (Penrose)	Officers from several agencies including Brevard Police, Transylvania County Sheriff, North Carolina Alcohol Law Enforcement and U.S. Department of Homeland Security went to Brown's home to server a warrant concerning operation of an illegal still. When officers entered his home, Brown ran upstairs and grabbed a rifle. After he refused to put it down the officers shot and killed him.
2015-03-09	Torres, Juan Antonio (67)		Texas (Laredo)	Torres was in the home of his neighbors, asking for money and threatening the mother and two daughters with a pistol. The two girls ran to the backyard where Torres followed them and killed them. The mother ran out the front door. When police arrived they tried to negotiate with Torres who remained in the house. He came out of the house and when he pointed his pistol at the officers they shot and killed him.
2015-03-09	Anthony Hill (27)	Black	Georgia (Chamblee)	Office workers called 911 on a man in underwear in a nearby parking lot. When police arrived, witnesses say Hill ran naked toward the officer, unarmed but with hands raised. The officer yelled for Hill to stop, then shot him. Hill suffered from bipolar disorder.
2015-03-09	Cedrick Lamont Bishop (30)	Black	Florida (Cocoa)	A deputy from Brevard County Sheriff's Office responded to a report of someone shooting into cars and homes. The deputy encountered someone matching the report's description and when the suspect saw the deputy he fired at the deputy. The two exchanged gunfire and the deputy shot and killed Bishop who had an extensive criminal history.
2015-03-09	James Brent Damon (46)	White	Colorado (Craig)	A Moffat County Sheriff's Deputy and a Colorado Parks and Wildlife officer were investigating a vehicle off U.S. Highway 40 when they encountered a man and a woman who took the officers hostage. The Parks and Wildlife officer found a chance to fight with Damon to retrieve his weapon. In the struggle he shot and killed Damon. The woman taken into custody.
2015-03-08	Michael L. McKillop (35)	White	Delaware (Claymont)	A Delaware State Trooper responding to a 1:35 a.m. burglar alarm at a drugstore encountered McKillop at the suspect got into his car. With the trooper at the open door McKillop attempted to drive away, dragging the trooper. The trooper shot McKillop who died a few hours later at a hospital.
2015-03-08	Aurelio V. Duarte (40)	Hispanic	Oklahoma (Oklahoma City)	Oklahoma City Police officers responded to a call of shots fired and found a wounded man. Nearby they found the suspect, Duarte, armed with a rifle. When the officer told Duarte to drop the rifle instead he aimed it toward the officer who then shot and killed him.
2015-03-08	Monique Jenee Deckard (43)	Black	California (Anaheim)	Anaheim Police officers investigating a stabbing at a laundromat found Deckard in an adjacent apartment complex. When she emerged from one of the apartments she was carrying two knives. She went at the officers and they fired, killing her.
2015-03-07	Adam O'Neal Reinhart (29)	White	Arizona (Phoenix)	When Reinhart was in the street acting strangely, Phoenix Police officers were called. As they approached him he pulled a handgun from his waistband. An officer with a rifle shot and mortally wounded Reinhart who died at a local hospital.
2015-03-06	Andrew Anthony Williams (48)	Black	Florida (Melrose)	Williams was shot and killed as he tried to drive away from a drug sting operation conducted by deputies from the Putnam County Sheriffs Office. A Sheriff's spokesman says Putnam was driving toward the deputies and four of them fired at his vehicle.
2015-03-06	Moore, Bernard (??)		Georgia (Atlanta)	Moore was crossing the street to get back to work when he was fatally struck by an allegedly speeding police cruiser. Officer Christopher Blaise, the driver, was not responding to any emergency at the time and did not have emergency lights or sirens.
2015-03-06	Tony Terrell Robinson (19)	Black	Wisconsin (Madison)	Shooting of Tony Robinson. According to Madison police chief Michael Koval, police received calls for a man jumping in and out of traffic and committing battery. Police officer Matthew Kenny followed Robinson into an apartment, where Robinson allegedly assaulted the officer, who then shot him multiple times. Robinson was unarmed. The prosecutor concluded that this was a lawful use of deadly force and Kenny was not charged with any crime, though a civil lawsuit from the family is pending. Details from the investigation have been publicly released.
2015-03-06	Sizer, James Fred (62)		Texas (Austin)	Austin Police officers responded to Sizer's call reporting an armed man was threatening him. Sizer told the 911 operator he was armed to protect himself. When police arrived Sizer was outside his home. Officers told him to get on the ground and when he said he could not, they tased him. As he fell to the ground he struck his head, causing a large cut. He was taken for medical treatment, then to jail, and released the next day. He died March 14. The family claims his death was caused by the injury to his head and has filed a lawsuit.
2015-03-06	Naeschylus Carter-Vinzant (37)	Black	Colorado (Aurora)	Vinzant, walking in a street unarmed, was shot once in the chest by an Aurora police officer. He was wanted for a parole violation when an officer approached him. It has not been determined what prompted the officer to fire.
2015-03-05	Tyson Damian Hubbard (34)	White	Nebraska (Lincoln)	Tyson Hubbard, wanted for allegedly breaking a man's eye socket with a drill, was shot and killed after struggling with a Lincoln Police officer and Lancaster County Sheriff deputy who attempted to arrest Hubbard on the driver's side of his vehicle. A U.S. marshal, approaching from the passenger side, fired several shots after seeing Hubbard reach for a revolver. Per state law, a grand jury will investigate the officers' actions.
2015-03-05	Sergio Alexander Navas (36)	Hispanic	California (Los Angeles)	Los Angeles Police Officers attempted to pull over an erratic driver about 2 am. He did not pull over and a chase ensued. Officers pulled their vehicle alongside his and the officer in the passenger seat fired several shots at Navas, resulting in his death. In December 2016 the City of Los Angeles settled with the family, agreeing to pay $2.5 million. A police board had found the officer violated department policy in the shooting.
2015-03-05	Tyrone Ryerson Lawrence (45)	Black	Wisconsin (Milwaukee)	Lawrence was killed by Milwaukee Police as he held a knife to his estranged wife. Although she had secured a restraining order against him for domestic abuse, he had previously violated it.
2015-03-04	Derek Cruice (26)	Hispanic	Florida (Deltona)	Derek Cruice was shot in the face during a drug raid for marijuana, he was unarmed and shirtless.
2015-03-04	Carl Lao (28)	Asian	California (Stockton)	Lao was firing a gun into the air when officers arrived and began exchanging gunfire with him. He died March 27, 2015.
2015-03-03	Jason Moland (29)	Black	California (Ceres)	
2015-03-03	Matthew Metz (25)	White	Arizona (Tempe)	Matthew Metz was shot and killed after he stabbed an officer responding to a domestic dispute. The Tempe officers heard screams for help, they were attacked as soon as they forced entry into the home.
2015-03-03	Fednel Rhinvil (25)	Black	Maryland (Salisbury)	Fednel Rhinvil was shot and killed after police say he pulled a gun on a deputy.
2015-03-02	Shaquille Barrow (20)	Black	Illinois (Joliet)	Shaquille Barrow was shot and killed after police say he pulled a gun on officers.
2015-03-01	Darrell "Hubbard" Gatewood (47)	Black	Oklahoma (Oklahoma City)	Darrell Gatewood AKA Hubbard died in police custody after the police used a taser and OC spray to restrain him.
2015-03-01	Uribe, Jessica (28)		Arizona (Tucson)	Shot and killed after she advanced toward an officer with a knife.
2015-03-01	Donald Lewis Matkins (49)	White	Mississippi (George County)	Killed after a standoff with police.
2015-03-01	Surnow, Jeffrey C. (63)		Hawaii (South Kohala)	On-duty officer in police car ran into bicyclist Surnow traveling same direction, killing him. Police arrested the officer, 30-year-old Jody Buddemeyer, on suspicion of negligent homicide. He was later "released pending further investigation."
2015-03-01	Keunang, Charley Leundeu, a.k.a. "Africa," "Cameroon"	Black	California (Los Angeles)	Charley Leundeu Keunang was a homeless man who went by "Africa," "Cameroon," or "Charley Saturmin Robinet" (a stolen ID). He was ordered by police to come out of his tent after fighting with someone inside the tent. After he allegedly refused the police order, they forcibly dragged him out of the tent. A physical altercation ensued with several police officers, during which one or more officers shot and killed Africa. At least two videos captured the incident.
2015-03-01	DeOntre L. Dorsey (32)	Black	Maryland (White Plains)	Dorsey ran his car off the road and deputies from the Charles County Sheriff's office were investigating the accident. He was described as having seizures while driving, which continued at the roadside. After a deputy tased Dorsey he stopped breathing, went into a semi-vegetative state, and died on 29 November 2015.

== See also ==
- Death in custody § United States
- Henry A. Wallace Police Crime Public Database
- List of cases of police brutality
- List of countries with annual rates and counts for killings by law enforcement officers
- List of law enforcement officers killed in the line of duty in the United States
- List of law enforcement officers convicted for an on-duty killing in the United States
- List of shootings by US immigration agents
- List of police reforms related to the George Floyd protests
- List of unarmed African Americans killed by law enforcement officers in the United States
- Lists of killings by law enforcement officers
- Police brutality in the United States
- Police misconduct § United States
- Police riot § United States
- Police use of deadly force in the United States
