= Ant Hill =

Ant Hill may refer to:

- Ant Hill (Worcester Range), a 1,310 m (4,300 ft) hill in Worcester Range, Antarctica
- Ant Hill (Zion National Park), a 6,641 ft (2,024 m) hill in Zion National Park, Utah, United States
- Ant hill, or ant colony

== See also ==
- Anthony Hill (disambiguation)
