= Alfred Hill (cricketer, born 1865) =

English cricketer

Personal information
- Full name: Alfred William Hill
- Born: 29 July 1865; Little Rissington, Gloucestershire, England
- Died: 27 May 1936 (aged 70); Bourton-on-the-Water, Gloucestershire, England
- Batting: Left-handed
- Bowling: Right-arm off break

Domestic team information
- Years: Team
- 1904–1905: Gloucestershire

Career statistics
Competition	First-class
Matches	2
Runs scored	30
Batting average	30.00
100s/50s	–/–
Top score	29*
Balls bowled	78
Wickets	1
Bowling average	54.00
5 wickets in innings	–
10 wickets in match	–
Best bowling	1/47
Catches/stumpings	–/–
- Source: Cricinfo, 26 July 2011

Alfred William Hill (29 July 1865 – 27 May 1936) was an English cricketer. Hill was a left-handed batsman who bowled right-arm off break. He was born at Little Rissington, Gloucestershire.

Hill made his first-class debut for Gloucestershire against the touring South Africans in 1904. In this match he took his only first-class wicket, that of William Shalders, for the cost of 47 runs from 10 overs. With the bat, he ended Gloucestershire's first-innings unbeaten on 29, while in their second-innings he was dismissed for a single run by Charlie Llewellyn. The following year he played his second and final first-class match for Gloucestershire, against Nottinghamshire in the 1905 County Championship. In this match, he bowled 3 wicket-less overs and wasn't required to bat.

He died at Bourton-on-the-Water, Gloucestershire, on 27 May 1936.
