= Alan Hill =

Alan Hill may refer to:

- Alan Richard Hill (Alan Richard Hill-Walker, 1859–1944), English recipient of the Victoria Cross
- Alan Hill (author) (1928–2021), English cricket writer
- Alan Hill (footballer, born 1933) (1933–2010), English professional footballer
- Alan Hill (footballer, born 1943) (born 1943), English professional football goalkeeper
- Alan Hill (footballer, born 1955) (born 1955), English professional footballer
- Alan Hill (cricketer) (born 1950), English cricketer and umpire
- Al Hill (ice hockey) (Alan Douglas Hill, born 1955), Canadian ice hockey player
- A. Alan Hill (1938–1996), American government official

== See also ==
- Al Hill (disambiguation)
- Allen Hill (disambiguation)
- Hill (surname)
