= Albert Hill =

Albert Hill may refer to:

- Albert E. Hill (1870–1933), American pro-labor politician
- Bertie Hill (Albert Edwin Hill, 1927–2005), British Olympic equestrian
- Albert G. Hill (1910–1996), American physicist
- Albert Ross Hill (1868–1943), Canadian-born American educator
- Albert Hill (athlete) (1889–1969), British Olympic athlete
- Albert Hill (VC) (1895–1971), British Victoria Cross recipient
- Albert Hill (American football) (active 1896–1969), American college football quarterback

== See also ==
- Al Hill (disambiguation)
- Hill (surname)
