= Alfred Hill =

Alfred Hill may refer to:

- Alfred John Hill (1862–1927), British railway engineer
- Alfred Hill (cricketer, born 1865) (1865–1936), English cricketer
- Alfred Hill (politician) (1867–1945), British Member of Parliament for Leicester West 1922–1923
- Alfred Hill (composer) (1869–1960), Australian composer and conductor
- Alfred Hill (cricketer, born 1887) (1887–1959), English cricketer
- Alfred Hill (bishop) (1901–1969), Anglican bishop of Melanesia
- Alfred Hill (Benny Hill, 1924–1992), British comedian

== See also ==
- Al Hill (disambiguation)
- Hill (surname)
