= Allex =

Allex may refer to:

== People ==
- Allex (footballer) (born 2006), Brazilian football midfielder
- Dennis Allex (died 2013), French trainer executed by an Islamic group
- Jake Allex (1887–1959), Serbian American soldier
- Michel Allex (1947–2008), French chocolatier and politician

== Places ==
- Allex, Drôme, commune near Crest in the Drôme department in southeastern France

== Other ==
- Allex, trade name of desloratadine
- Allex Cargo, airline that merged into Air Japan
- Toyota Allex, also known as Toyota Corolla (E120)

== See also ==
- Crocidura allex, also known as East African highland shrew
- Alex
- Alexx (disambiguation)
