= Anthony Hill =

Anthony or Antonio or Antony Hill may refer to:

- Anthony Hill (cricketer) (1901–1986), English cricketer
- Anthony Hill (artist) (1930–2020), British artist
- Antony Rowland Clegg-Hill, 8th Viscount Hill (1931–2003), British peer
- Anthony Hill (author) (born 1942), Australian author
- Anthony Hill (squash player) (born 1969), Australian squash player
- Anthony F. Hill (active from 1986), New Zealand chemist working in Australia
- Anthony Herschel Hill (1939–2016), English composer
- Anthony Hill (rugby union) (born 1973), Australian rugby union footballer
- Anthony Hill (tight end) (born 1985), American football player
- Anthony Hill Jr. (born 2005), American college football linebacker for the Texas Longhorns
- Anthony Hill, US veteran shot and killed by police in 2015; see killing of Anthony Hill
- Anthony Hill (industrialist) (1784–1862), Welsh industrialist, owner of the Plymouth Ironworks
- Anthony Hill (actor) (born 1987), American actor on Grey's Anatomy

== See also ==
- Tony Hill (disambiguation)
- Battle of Anthony's Hill, a military engagement in 1864 during the American Civil War
- Tony Hills (American football) (Anthony Tremaine Hills, born 1984), American professional footballer
