= Alexander Hill =

Alexander Hill may refer to:

- Alexander Hill (minister) (1785–1867), Scottish minister of the Church of Scotland
- Alexander Staveley Hill (1825–1905), British lawyer and politician
- Alexander Hill (academic) (1856–1929), British physician and academic
- Alexander Erskine-Hill (1894–1947), Scottish Unionist Party politician
- Alexander Hill (rower) (born 1993), Australian rower
- Alexander Hill (Ross Island), a hill on Ross Island, Antarctica

== See also ==
- Al Hill (disambiguation)
- Alex Hill (disambiguation)
- Alexander Hills, mountain range, California
- Alexandra Hill (disambiguation)
- Hill (surname)
