= Tony Hill =

Tony Hill may refer to:

- Tony Hill (Australian footballer) (born 1949), Australian footballer for Footscray
- Tony Hill (cricketer) (born 1952), New Zealand cricketer
- Tony Hill (umpire) (born 1951), international cricket umpire from New Zealand
- Tony Hill (wide receiver) (born 1956), American football player
- Tony Hill (politician) (born 1957), American politician from Florida
- Tony Hill, British musician, founder member of the band High Tide
- Tony Hill (defensive end) (born 1968), American football player
- Dr. Tony Hill, fictional psychologist in the TV show Wire in the Blood
- Tony Hill (boxer) (born 1986), British boxer

== See also ==
- Tony Hills, fictional character on EastEnders
- Tony Hills (American football) (born 1984), offensive tackle
- Anthony Hill (disambiguation)
