= Aaron Hill =

Aaron Hill may refer to:

- Aaron Hill (writer) (1685–1750), English dramatist and writer
- Aaron Hill (baseball) (born 1982), American player in Major League Baseball
- Aaron Hill (actor) (born 1983), American actor
- Aaron Hill (Luann), comic strip character
- Aaron Hill (snooker player) (born 2002), Irish snooker player

== See also ==
- Aaron Hill House, historic house in Cambridge, Massachusetts
- Erin Hill, American harpist, singer, and actress
