= Pingpongo =

Variation of table tennis

PINGPONGO
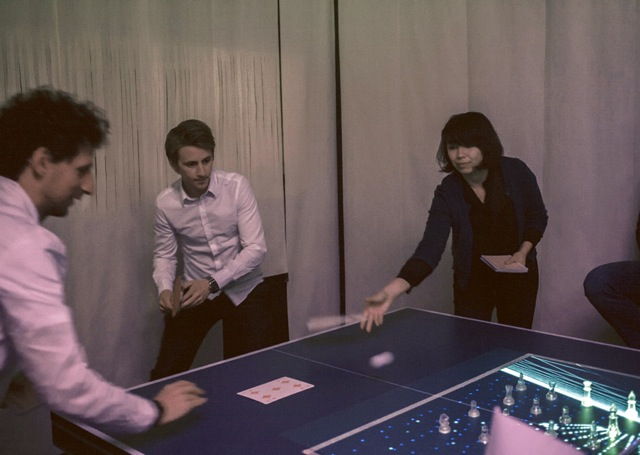
- Pingpongo match in Oslo
- Highest governing body: Pingpongo Board (PPOB)
- Nicknames: Ping pong with Obstacles
- First played: December 2, 2010

Characteristics
- Contact: Depends on the variation played
- Team members: Singles, Doubles, teams
- Mixed-sex: Unisex
- Type: indoor and outdoor
- Equipment: Table, paddles, balls and obstacles

Presence
- Country or region: Worldwide
- Olympic: No

Ping pong with obstacles, or Pingpongo, is a sport that consists of a variation of ping pong or traditional table tennis, by adding material and/or mental obstacles. It was created in Argentina in 2010 but is also officially played since 2013 in Norway and Uruguay.

In addition to the official venues where tournaments are regularly held, some special one-time official tournaments have been held in Guatemala, Brazil, France, Community of Madrid, Basque Country and Wales, this last as part of the World Alternative Games 2014.

== General characteristics ==
=== The game ===
According to its rules, pingpongo encourages creativity and the personalization of the sport by its players. Thus, there are no fixed rules, but a general framework is set by the official rules themselves, which state as follows:

Everything that is not ping pong is ping pong with obstacles. This sport can be played with or without a table, net, ball, as long as something goes from a place to another, and an objective scoring system and a way of winning a match are established.

=== The table and the net ===
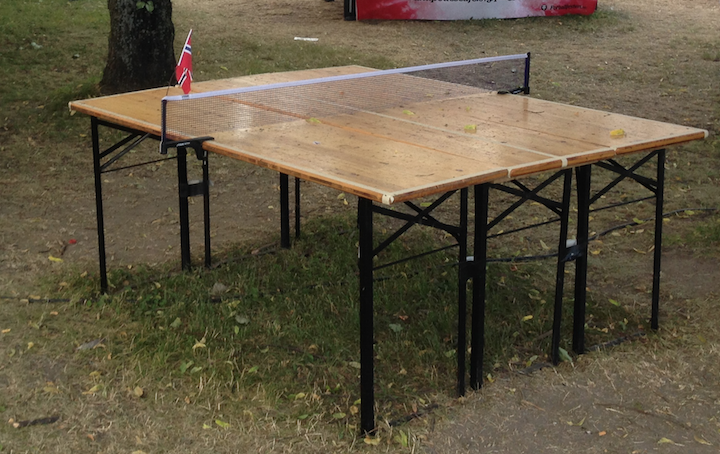
Pingpongo table in Fotballfesten Oslo, Norway, June 2014

Pingpongo has no regulations for the size of the table or net, neither for their existence. There is only a recommendation that if using a table (or tables) for playing with a bouncing ball, surfaces should allow the game to have certain continuity regardless of their irregularities and the consequent unpredictable trajectory of the ball. In any case table should present equal difficulties to all players.

During official tournaments, matches were performed on conventional table tennis tables, festival tables, groups of small bar tables, on tables made up with timber from old public benches, and even on boards propped on trestles.

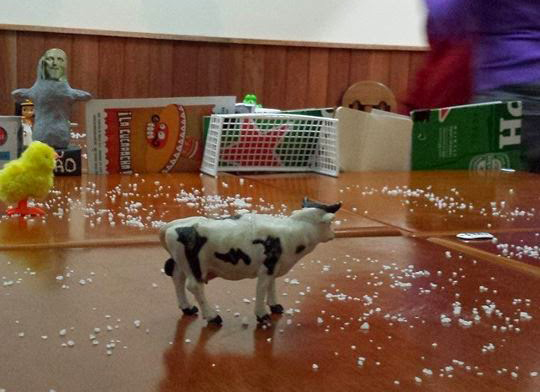
Details of pingpongo obstacles, table and net used during the special official tournament placed in Rio de Janeiro, Brazil, July 2014

=== Paddles and balls ===
The paddles and balls to be used also depend on the variety previously agreed upon for the development of the match or tournament. In the classic variations of pingpongo the traditional paddles and ball of ping pong are used.

=== Obstacles ===
Obstacles can be either tangible or intangible. Pingpongo has the stated purpose of promoting dialogue and consensus; thus, any obstacle must be determined by mutual agreement of the players of a given match or tournament.

The number of obstacles that may be used is infinite; therefore, pingpongo is a sport with an infinite number of game variations. Every type of obstacle to be used during official events must be previously approved by the PPOB. Even though the rules are very permissive and allow creativity at all times, when practicing pingpongo officially the use of animals as obstacles is not allowed, nor are: smoking, making Nazi comments, or any kind of expression of violence, or using cell phones during the matches.

In Norway, for instance, the organizers of each official tournament previously determine the conceptual framework in which the material and mental obstacles, the communications and the decoration of the event will be set. So, there were tournaments where the material obstacles ranged from chess pieces to images projected on the table, and the mental obstacles went from paying compliments to the opponent when hitting the ball to singing "Happy Xmas (War Is Over)" by Yoko Ono and John Lennon nonstop while listening to it with headphones during the whole match.

==== Material obstacles ====
Some of the most used material obstacles in Argentina are Rubik's Cubes, plastic building blocks and Jenga pieces, as basic obstacles, placing one, two, or three on each side of the table (the same number on each side). Other material obstacles used more sporadically are grains of salt (in Argentina, Uruguay and Brazil). These obstacles are spread equally on both sides of the table and they stand out for increasing the unpredictability of the ball's trajectory. In Norway, each tournament is developed in relation to one or several topics, and all material obstacles are chosen in order to highlight them.

Other common obstacles are: beer bottles, cups, framed photos of Carlos Gardel, football players figurines, toy football goals, toy animals, signs depicting the amounts of money spent to organise the Olympic Games, and plastic cups. In some tournaments, players may add own material obstacles.

During November 2014, several of these material obstacles were featured in a show called "memoria futura" (Future memory) at the Centro Cultural de España in Montevideo. Exhibition arranged by antipodes café with the collaboration of the Uruguayan Association of Pingpongo, AOPPO Asociación Oriental de Pingpong con Obstáculos.

==== Mental obstacles ====
The purpose of these obstacles is to create a scenario where players split their performance between material and immaterial. For example by answering questions, mentioning things while hitting the ball (countries, flowers, compliments, etcetera), singing songs, or keeping a certain conversation.

=== Matches ===
Matches are usually singles, but pingpongo can be played in teams. There is no differentiation by gender or age in pingpongo; therefore, both men and women of all ages can play as equals in the tournaments.

The game came be similar to traditional table tennis, meaning, a player gets a point when the opponent fails to stop the ball from bouncing twice on his side of the table or return it to the other side, or returns it out of the other court. However, since the rules are established before every match or tournament, different ways of scoring and winning matches can be set. Variations are infinite, but every rule to be applied on the game will be previously agreed upon by the players of the match and/or tournament, and, in the case of official events, the rules must previously supervised by the Pingpongo Board (PPOB, the pingpongo authority on a world level).

=== Game length ===
In general, the match or set ends when one of the two players obtains 7, 11 or 15 points, as agreed beforehand, gaining a lead of one or two points. When both players are even with 6, 10, or 14 points each, they will play successive points (where each player will serve once per point in turn) until one of them wins by a two-point difference. This may vary according to the variation. For example, in the football variation, when both players are even one point to the end of the set or the match, definition is made by “penalties”, which implies that each player hits the ball with his paddle sending it to the other side of the table trying to put the ball through a small goal set for that purpose.

Depending on the competition and the stage within it, a match of pingpongo may be played to the best of 1, 3, or 5 sets.

=== Service ===
Service is done freely and decided by both players before a match.

The most common serve is the same as in table tennis where the ball must bounce first in the server's side of the table and then on the receiver's one. A mistake in service gives a point to the opponent, this can happen when the ball hits the net, bounces on the server's court or on one of the server's obstacles and does not pass onto the opponent's court, or if it does not bounce on the opponent's court. If the ball touches the net upon service and passes onto the opponent's court, service shall be done again. .

Each player serves two consecutive points, after which the opponent serves. If the match is for 11 points and both players score 10, each player shall serve once until the game ends with a lead of two points for one of the players. The same happens if the match or set is for 15 points and is tied on 13.

The players can switch court every six points.

=== Umpires ===
During official pingpongo tournaments the umpire or umpires may be the players themselves, the event organizers or the audience. Some matches present different obstacles that require the participation of more than one umpire. For example, if the mental obstacle during a match is that the players name a flower every time they hit the ball with the paddle, and if they fail to do it they lose a point, it will be necessary to add one umpire per player to keep track of this rule. The players may agree to manage without umpires and umpire the match themselves. Every official tournament in official venues must have one manager in charge of keeping record of the match results, which shall be later sent to the PPOB for the ranking. Every special official tournament shall have at least one member of the PPOB present, who may participate in the tournament, act as umpire or only supervise.

=== Variations ===
A section of the official rules states that a variation of pingpongo may be accepted as official "as long as it is agreed before each tournament or match between participants". Also, when there is a dilemma about a formal aspect of the game, the aim is to always choose the option that creates more dynamism and entertainment for the players and the audience.

Even though there are an infinite number of variations, there are some already in use or recommended by the PPOB, and which may be used simultaneously:

- Conservative variation: Three small obstacles per side, placed by each player on the opponent's court following strategic outlines. Once placed, they cannot be moved, except unintentionally.
- Salted” variation: The PPOB supervisor or umpire spreads equal amounts of salt on each side of the table.
- 'Questions and answers pingpongo:Every time a player hits the ball must mention an element belonging to a certain topic.
- Glass (cup) variation: A plastic cup is placed in the middle of each court. If a player dunks the ball in the glass, and it does not topple over, he/she automatically wins the match.
- Structural variation: The surface of the table is modified, it can be an irregular surface or completely different from the one normally used for table tennis.
- Jenga Pingpongo: Ten Jenga pieces are placed, vertically, on each side. A point is lost for each piece that is toppled over.

== History ==
The origin of Pingpongo is dated December the 2nd 2010, when members of Bola Sin Manija, an Argentinian independent group of critic and promotion of alternative sports established the Asociación Argentina de Pingpong con Obstáculos (Argentine Association of Ping Pong with obstacles), defining in addition the first rule guidelines and first official tournament of this sport.

Norway was added as official venue in August 2013 and Uruguay the same year in September. In Norway tournaments are played basically in Oslo both in public and private indoors and outdoor spaces, but one official tournament was developed in Longyearbyen, Svalbard in 2014.

Besides the official venues where tournaments are placed periodically, there have been special official tournaments placed in Guatemala (2012), Brazil (2014), Wales (2014), Basque Country (2014), Community of Madrid (2014) and France (2015). As of today, more than 500 people from over 30 nationalities have played this sport officially.

In 2013 after Norway and Uruguay became official venues, AAPPO created a global online administrative board called AAPPO-Board, which in 2014, in agreement with the rest of the official venues changed its name to PINGPONGO BOARD or PPOB.

Several artistic variations of table tennis, like those created by George Maciunas or later by Gabriel Orozco, as well as popular alterations like beer pong or slam pong can be found but none of them constitutes a sport with an international e independent organisation defining rules, rankings and official regular activities. But all members of the international board (PPOB) agreed that the sport exist from the beginning of existence.

== Pingpongo Board ==
The Pingpongo Board (PPOB) is the authority that rules the development of Pingpongo in the world at official level, defining the basic rules of the sport, running its World Ranking in its two variants and supervising all official tournaments, be them in special or official venues. It is composed by the founding members of the AAPPO, and by a maximum of two members from each official venue. Any country interested in being an official venue or in organizing an official special tournament should contact with PPOB via email and subsequently maintain an open communication, basically on-line.

== Classification or ranking ==
There are three official rankings: Local Rankings, Biannual World Rankings (2014–2015; 2016–2017, etc.) and Historical World Ranking. Both World Rankings are updated by the PPOB the week after an official tournament takes place.

=== Distribution of points ===
The points awarded by tournaments for each position correspond with a unified system established by the PPOB in relation with the number of participants in the tournament. Example the distribution of points in relation with the number of participants in direct elimination tournaments:

Participants	W	F	3º	4º	QF	R16	R32
32	320	160	96	64	40	20	1
23	230	115	69	46	28	1 or 14 (*)	1
16	160	80	48	32	20	1	--

( * ) In any case, when losing the first game, either in first or second round, the participant will receive one point. In case of advancing to second round after winning a game during first round, the player will get the corresponding points, which in this example for 23 participants would be 14.

A round-robin tournament define points for each match won. In Pingpongo, these points are defined by the total of points of the tournament (which is the same as the number of players multiplied by 10) divided by the number of matches to be played in the Round Robin series by all players. A round-robin tournament can help to define for example four semifinalist or just the two finalist who will receive points according to the previous table of elimination tournaments. A round-robin tournament helps players to play more and have more chances to advance to the finals. This system is used in the FIFA World Cup, for example.

=== Historical world ranking ===
Historical classification includes all the official tournaments played since the origin of the Argentine Association of Ping Pong with obstacles (AAPPO). It is updated during the week in which an official tournament takes place.

"Top 10". Last updated: August 31, 2015

Pos	Player	Nationality	Points
1	Martín Completa	Argentina	1.530
2	Nicolás Bruno	Argentina	1.120
3	Juan Martín Gutiérrez	Argentina	1.090
4	Alex Asensi	Valencia	918
5	Fernando Parra	Colombia	801
6	Ezequiel Bertrán	Argentina	693
7	Bruno Moleda	Uruguay	552
8	Hernán Lopez Winne	Argentina	534
9	Lucas Arias	Argentina	532
10	Bruno Ciocca	Argentina	523

=== Biennial World Ranking ===
The Biennial World Ranking was created by the PPOB with the goal to unify the scoring system between the various organizations and it is a ranking that takes into account the points distributed in the world during a period of two years. Once completed the period of 104 weeks a new ranking begins. Current Biennial World ranking corresponds to the years 2014 and 2015.

"Top 10". Last updated: August 31, 2015

Pos	Player	Nationality	Points
1	Nicolás Bruno	Argentina	1120
2	Alex Asensi	Valencia	799
3	Alejandro Torre	Uruguay	599
4	Ezequiel Bertrán	Argentina	570
5	Juan Martín Gutiérrez	Argentina	420
6	Felipe Ridao	Uruguay	368
7	Diego Skliar	Argentina	340
8	Sara Galvão	Portugal	320
8	Álvaro García	Spain	320
10	Eduardo Balbi	Uruguay	308

=== Local rankings ===
Local rankings are regulated by the heads of each official venue but follow a unified system of distribution of points. They are updated during the week after a tournament takes place. Unlike world rankings, local rankings can give more than 1600 points a year and can be historical (counting all the points from the start of the official activities in the venue) or defined by periods of time (for example, annual, biennial, etc.)

Example: "Top 10" Ranking PINGPONGO NORGE 2013–2015. Last updated: Dec. 11th, 2015

Pos	Player	Nationality	Points
1	Alex Asensi	Valencia	918
2	Felipe Ridao	Uruguay	547
3	Jo Ofrim Bjørke	Norway	516
4	Sebastián Correa	Uruguay	240
5	Tom Haugeplass	Norway	229
6	Ian Correia Sampaio	Brazil	200
7	Lars Thomas Dolven	Norway	180
8	Tuva Langfeldt	Norway	171
9	Jordi Marset	Valencia	151
10	Pedro Rubio	Uruguay	120

== Official special tournaments ==
Official special tournaments must count with the presence and/or participation of at least one member of the PPOB and have to previously be coordinated with the PPOB. They must have a minimum of eight participants and provide points for the “Historical” and “biennial” global rankings in accordance with the number of participants as the classification system indicate. Official special tournaments do not allow the creation of a local official ranking.

Official special tournaments have been played in Guatemala (2013), Brazil (2014) and Wales (2014), the latter during the World Alternative Games 2014 that took place in Llanwrtyd Wells, the smallest town in Great Britain. Of the 32 participants, 29 were local, which would be almost 5% of the total population of the city. Another curiosity of this tournament was that it had both the oldest player ever (79 years old) and the two youngest ones (seven years old twins who also played between them in the first ever official match between twins).

No Pingpongo tournament demands a registration fee for the participants.

Date	Tournament	Location	Champion	Runner up	Result	Points
2014	Pingpongo Madrid "Design as Obstacle" Tournament	Madrid, Community of Madrid	(Spain) Francisco Fernández Ferreiro	(Belgium) David Berkvens	9–11 / 11–9 / 12–10	150
2014	Pingpongo Madrid "Relaxing Cup"	El Campo de Cebada, Madrid, Community of Madrid	(Spain) Álvaro García	(Spain) Mario Fuentes	15(taza)–10 / 10–15 / 15–10	160
2014	Pingpongo Euskadi	(Basque Country (autonomous community)) Hondartza, Zarautz, Basque Country	(Basque Country (autonomous community)) Imanol Uriarte	(Uruguay) Roberto Díaz	11–9 / 11–8	160
2014	Pingpongo World Alternative Games 2014 Tournament	Llanwrtyd Wells, Wales	(Portugal) Sara Galvão	(Wales) Peter Brown	15–8 / 15–11	320
2014	I Aberto Brasileiro de Pingpongo	Rio de Janeiro, Brazil	(Argentina) Hernán López Winne	(Argentina) Luciano Altman	11–10 (penalties) / 8–11 / 11–0 (Cow goal)	190
2013	Special challenger AAPPO 15	Ciudad de Guatemala, Guatemala	(Guatemala) Gary Estrada	(Chile) / (Argentina) Francisco Godinez	11–7	15

== Official venues ==
To become an official venue, organizers must contact the PPOB prior to the start of the activities. Each official venue must perform a minimum of three tournaments per year and count with a minimum of 24 participants per year. No tournament of pingpongo must involve any sort of registration fee for participants. Prior to each tournament official venues must notify PPOB the basic rules of said tournament.

Once the tournament is finished the official venue is responsible for sending a text and image report to the PPOB as well as the results with the detail of the distribution of points according to the scoring system established by the PPOB. The official venue is responsible for communicating their own events as well as creating and updating their local ranking based on the official points.

The name of the venue is standardized by the PPOB and includes the word Pingpongo first and then the country (recognized or not recognized), autonomous community or city name in Spanish, English or in local language written with latin alphabet.

The current official venues are Pingpongo Argentina, Pinpongo Uruguay and Pingpongo Norge.

=== Tournaments by official venues ===
==== Pingpongo Argentina ====
Date	Tournament	Location	Champion	Runner up	Result	Points
2015.03	VII Abierto Argentino de Pingpongo	FM La Tribu, Ciudad de Buenos Aires, Argentina	(Argentina) Nicolás Bruno	(Argentina) Ezequiel Bertrán	9–11 / 11–9 / 11–6	320
2014.12	VI Abierto Argentino de Pingpongo	FM La Tribu, Ciudad de Buenos Aires, Argentina	(Argentina) Nicolás Bruno	(Argentina) Pablo Rowinski	11–1 (vaso)	320
2014.06	PingPongo Edición Mundial	FM La Tribu, Ciudad de Buenos Aires, Argentina	(Argentina) Nicolás Bruno	(Argentina) Juan Martín Gutiérrez	11–6 / 11–6	320
2014.03	IV Abierto Argentino de Pingpongo	FM La Tribu, Ciudad de Buenos Aires, Argentina	(Argentina) Ezequiel Bertrán	(Argentina) Juan Martín Gutiérrez	11–6 / 11–9	400
2013.10	I Copa Codasports	Ce.Re.NA, Ezeiza, Buenos Aires, Argentina	(Argentina) Agustín Manzanel	(Argentina) Pablo Vázquez	11–3 / 12–14 / 11–3	150
2013.07	III Abierto Argentino de Pingpongo	Fm La Tribu, Ciudad de Buenos Aires, Argentina	(Colombia) Fernando Parra	(Argentina) Martín Completa	11–6 / 11–6	750
2012.12	II Abierto Argentino de Pingpongo	Fm La Tribu, Ciudad de Buenos Aires, Argentina	(Argentina) Martín Completa	(Argentina) Lucas Arias	11–9 / 11–4	500
2012.08	I Abierto Argentino de Pingpongo	Fm La Tribu, Ciudad de Buenos Aires, Argentina	(Argentina) Martín Completa	(Argentina) Lucas Arias	11–6 / 11–6	500

==== Pingpongpo Norge ====
Date	Tournament	Location	Champion	Runner up	Result	Points
2015.12	Pingpongo Dazzle Tournament	Kulturhuset, Oslo, Norway	(Norway) Jo Ofrim Bjørke	(Norway) Arjan Memisi	11–5 / 11–8	180
2015.10	Noble Pingpongo Prize Tournament	Kulturhuset, Oslo, Norway	(Norway) Jo Ofrim Bjørke	(Uruguay) Felipe Ridao	8–11 / 11–6 / 11–6	120
2015.09	Vote Pingpongo Party Tournament	Kulturhuset, Oslo, Norway	(Uruguay) Felipe Ridao	(Norway) Halvor Haukeli	11–3 / 10–12 / 11–7	80
2015.08	Summertime and the livin is easy Cup	Kulturhuset, Oslo, Norway	(Uruguay) Sebastián Correa	(Uruguay) Pedro Rubio	11–7 / 10–12 / 11–7	240
2015.03	Evolution Tournament	Kulturhuset, Oslo, Norway	(Valencian Community) Jordi Marset	(Norway) Renate Vea Petersson	6–11 / 11–6 / 11–4	150
2014.10	PINGPONGO 78°N	Karlsberger Pub, Longyearbyen, Svalbard, Norway	(Norway) Lars Thomas Dolven	(Norway) Tommy Andersen	15–11 / 15–1	180
2014.08	VIP Championship	Kulturhuset UT, Youngstorget, Oslo, Norway	(Brazil) Ian Correia Sampaio	(Uruguay) Felipe Ridao	9–11 / 12–10 / 11–9	200
2014.06	VM i PINGPONGO	Fotballfesten, Kontraskjæret, Oslo, Norway	(Valencian Community) Alex Asensi	(Uruguay) Felipe Ridao	15–13 / 15–10	290
2014.04	Banana Tournament	Kulturhuset, Oslo, Norway	(Valencian Community) Alex Asensi	(Brazil) André Carballo	12–10	120
2014.03	Hot Cool Yours Tournament	Kulturhuset, Oslo, Norway	(Valencian Community) Alex Asensi	(Norway) Tom Haugeplass	11–4 / 4–11 / 11–5	320
2013.11	War is Over Pingpongo	Kulturhuset, Oslo, Norway	(Norway) Jo Ofrim Bjørke	(Norway) Kristian Nørgaard	6–11 / 11–9 / 11–7	101
2013.10	Revolution Tournament	Kulturhuset, Oslo, Norway	(Valencian Community) Alex Asensi	(Norway) Tune Aksnes Lian	14–12 / 11–7	101
2013.09	Jennifer Cup Montevideo-Oslo	Kulturhuset, Oslo, Norway	(Norway) Asgeir Krogh	(Norway) Anja Naper	11–8 / 11–4	101
2013.08	Oslo Closed	Schous Plass, Oslo, Norway	(Nepal) Jyoti Shrestha	(Nepal) Amrit Shrestha	15–10 / 15–11	101

==== Pingpongo Uruguay ====
Date	Tournament	Location	Champion	Runner up	Result	Points
2014.11	IV Abierto Uruguayo "Memoria Futura" (Closing the first exhibition about Pingpongo)	Centro Cultural de España, Montevideo, Uruguay	(Uruguay) Sergio Rodríguez	(Uruguay) Juan Manuel Rodríguez	13–11/ 11–8	120
2014.05	III Abierto Uruguayo	Rincón del Parque, Montevideo, Uruguay	(Uruguay) Nicolás Damiani	(Uruguay) Alejandro Torre	11–8/ 11–9	240
2013.12	Copa Jennifer II	Rincón del Parque, Montevideo, Uruguay	(Uruguay) Sergio Gerali	(Uruguay) Fabián Iturrioz	11–9	250
2013.09	Copa Jennifer I	Rincón del Parque, Montevideo, Uruguay	(Uruguay) Bruno Moleda	(Argentina) Juan Martín Gutiérrez	11–6 / 11–8	500
