= Alex Padilla (disambiguation) =

Alex Padilla may refer to:

- Alex Padilla, a United States senator
- Alex Padilla (racing driver), a racecar driver
- Alex Padilla (American football), an American football player
- Álex Padilla, a Mexican footballer

== See also ==
- Alejandro Padilla, an American soccer player
- Alejandro Garcia Padilla, a Puerto Rican politician
- Alexandre Padilha, a Brazilian physician and politician
