= Alexander Hills =

- Location within California

Highest point
- Elevation: 1,005 m (3,297 ft)

Geography
- Country: United States
- State: California
- District: San Bernardino County
- Range coordinates: 35°45′57.891″N 116°6′52.069″W
- Topo map: USGS Tecopa Pass

The Alexander Hills are a mountain range in the Mojave Desert near Death Valley, in northern San Bernardino County, California.
