= Depot Road Zhen Shan Mei Claypot Laksa =

Street food stall in Singapore

- Interactive map of Depot Road Zhen Shan Mei Claypot Laksa

Restaurant information
- Food type: Street food
- Location: 120 Bukit Merah, #01-75, Alexandra Village Food Centre, Alexandra Village, 150120, Singapore
- Coordinates: 1.286343°N 103.804526°E

Depot Road Zhen Shan Mei Claypot Laksa is a street food stall in the Alexandra Village Food Centre in Alexandra Village, Singapore. The food stall was awarded the Michelin Bib Gourmand in 2016.

== History ==
Originally located along Depot Road, the stall was founded by the aunt of the stall's current owner Zhang Ji Lin. However, she was forced to relocate to Alexandra Village Food Centre, and Zhang took over the stall from her, due to her deteriorating health.

== Reception ==
The stall was one of 37 stalls in Singapore to be awarded the Michelin Bib Gourmand Award in 2016. It has maintained its position in the Michelin Bib Gourmand. Bryan Choo of TheSmartLocal gave the stall a positive review, stating that he believed this was the best Laksa place in Singapore. Time Out included the stall in its list of the nine best Laksa in Singapore.
