= Andrew Hill =

Andrew, Andy or Drew Hill may refer to:

== Music ==
- Andrew Hill (jazz musician) (1931–2007), American jazz pianist and composer
- Andy Hill (American music producer) (born 1951), American record producer and educator
- Andy Hill (composer) (born 1957), British music producer and songwriter
- Charlton Hill (Andrew James Charlton Hill, born 1975), Australian actor and singer-songwriter

== Sports ==
- Andrew Hill (footballer) (born 1980), Australian rules footballer
- Drew Hill (1956–2011), American football player
- Andy Hill (footballer) (born 1965), English footballer
- Andy Hill (basketball) (born c. 1950), American basketball player, TV executive, author, and speaker

== Other ==
- Andrew Hill (MP) (fl. 1741), member of parliament of (then) Great Britain for Bishop's Castle
- Andrew P. Hill (1853–1922), American artist, photographer and environmentalist
  - Andrew Hill High School (opened 1956), named for Andrew P. Hill
- Andrew Hill (anthropologist) (1946–2015), British palaeoanthropologist
- Andrew Hill (artist) (born 1952), Australian artist in the Progressive Art Movement in Adelaide in the 1970s
- Andy Hill (politician) (1962–2016), American politician
- Andy Hill (pilot), pilot of plane that crashed in the 2015 Shoreham Airshow crash
