= Alan Hill (footballer, born 1933) =

English footballer

Personal information
- Full name: Alan Hill
- Date of birth: 1 July 1933
- Place of birth: Bromborough, England
- Date of death: July 2010 (aged 77)
- Place of death: Birkenhead, Wirral, England
- Position: Winger

Senior career*
Years	Team	Apps	(Gls)
1956–1957	Tranmere Rovers	6	(1)
- * Club domestic league appearances and goals

Alan Hill (1 July 1933 – July 2010) was a footballer who played as a winger in the Football League for Tranmere Rovers.
