= Alex Cook =

Alex Cook may refer to:

- Alex Cook (American football) (born 1999), American football player
- Alex Cook (fighter) (born 1973), Australian mixed martial artist
- A. G. Cook (Alex Cook) (born 1990), British music producer
- Bud Cook (Alexander Cook) (1907–1993), Ice hockey player
- Alex Cook (baseball) (born 2001), Baseball player

== See also ==
- Alexander Cooke (died 1614), actor
- Alexander Macdougall Cooke (1899–1999), doctor
