= Alex Asensi =

Norwegian photographer and Pingpongo player

- Name: ALEX ASENSI
- Birth date: February 9, 1984 (age 42)
- Birth place: Valencia
- Residence: Norway
- Official venue: PINGPONGO NORGE
- Turned pro: 2013
- Plays: Right-handed (one-handed backhand)
- Singles record: 28–4
- Singles titles: 4
- Highest World Biennial Ranking 2014–2015: 1 (Apr.,2014)
- World Biennial Ranking 2014–2015: 2
- Highest World Historical Ranking: 3 (Jun.,2014)
- Current World Historical Ranking: 3
- Highest Norwegian Ranking 2013–2015: 1 (Oct. 2014)
- Norwegian Ranking 2013–2015: 1
- Updated December 27, 2015

Alex Asensi (born February 9, 1984), is a photographer and distinguished Pingpongo player in Norway. He has won four official Pingpongo tournaments in Oslo finishing the season 2013–2015 as the top leader of the Norwegian Ranking. He has also finished the season 2014–2015 as the number 2 of the World Biennial Ranking. He played 28 matches, winning 24 of them.

== Photographer ==
Asensi is also a photographer of this alternative sport. He captured pictures at all tournaments in which he has participated.

== Official Pingpongo career ==
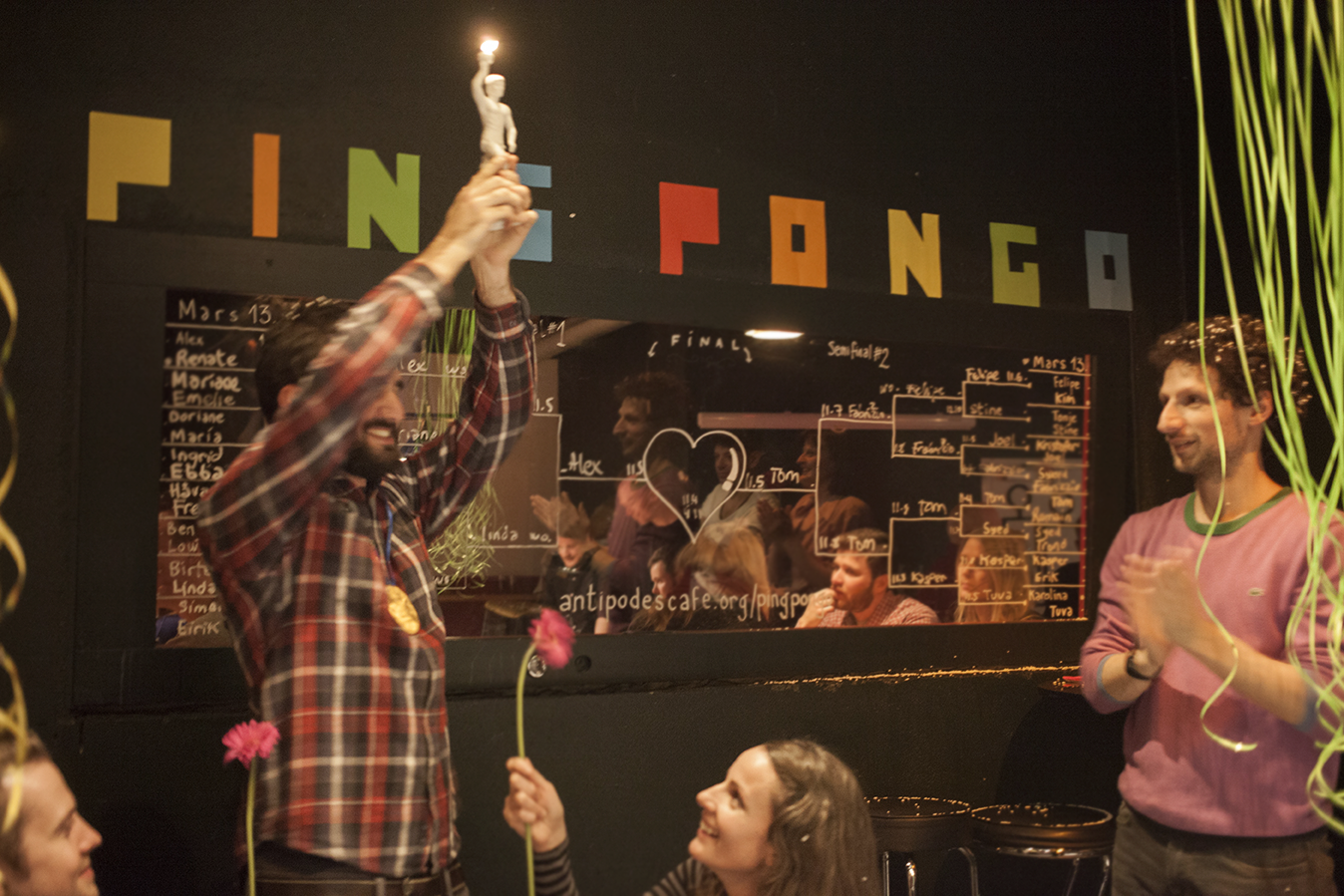
Alex Asensi, champion of Pingpongo tournament, Mar2014

=== 2013 ===
Asensi made his debut in this sport in Norway during the tournament held in October 2013 at Kulturhuset i Oslo. He won the tournament by defeating the local player Tune Aksnes Lian in the final in two sets, 14–12 and 11–7. Later, in November, he played the last tournament of the year, losing in the quarterfinals 8–11 to the Norwegian Kristian Nørgaard. With the points from both tournaments, he finished 2013 as the No. 1 player in Norway.

=== 2014 ===
He won the first three official tournaments of Pingpongo in Norway, reinforcing his top position in both the Norwegian and World rankings. In August, he reached the semi-final of the VIP Championship but lost to the Brazilian Ian Correia Sampaio, 10–12.

=== 2015 ===
In this year he just participated in a single tournament, being defeated by the local Renate Vea Petterson.

== Results ==
2015.03 – Evolution tournament
Round	Opponent	Score
R16	(Sweden) Daniel	11–7
QF	(Norway) Renate Vea Petterson	7–11

2014.08 – VIP Championship
Round	Opponent	Score
RR	(Poland) Alekschok Nowak	11–1
RR	(Sweden) Janita Sundqvist	11–6
RR	(Norway) Birte Guttormsen	8–11
QF	(Norway) Jo Ofrim Bjerke	12–10
SF	(Brazil) Ian Correia Sampaio	10–12

2014.06 – VM i PINGPONGO Tournament
Round	Opponent	Score
RR	(Norway) Ina Holth	11–5
RR	(Norway) x	11–4
R16	(Norway) Cornelia Kristiansen	11–4
QF	(Brazil) Sergio Pilar	11–7
SF	(France) Southinanh Oudomphanh	11–9
F	(Uruguay) Felipe Ridao	15–13, 15–10

2014.04 – Banana Tournament
Round	Opponent	Score
R1	(Norway) Torunn O. Bjerve	12–10
QF	(Norway) Tuva Langfeldt	11–5
SF	(Spain) Pedro Mateos Aparicio	12–10
F	(Brazil) André Carvallo	12–10

2014.03 – Hot. Cool. Yours. Tournament
Round	Opponent	Score
R32	(Norway) Renate Vea Petersson	11–4
R16	(Norway) Mariane Melgård	11–1
QF	(France) Doriane Happel	11–5
SF	(Norway) Linda Bournane Engelberth	11–5
F	(Norway) Tom Haugeplass	11–4, 4–11, 11–5

2013.11 – War is Over Pingpongo
Round	Opponent	Score
R32	Bye	
R16	(Norway) Roy Erling Nesheim	11–2
QF	(Norway) Kristian Nørgaard	8–11

2013.10 – Revolution Tournament
Round	Opponent	Score
R32	Bye	
R16	(Norway) Nora Guttormsgaard	11–2
QF	(Italy) Ylenia Arca	11–2
SF	(Nepal) Amrit Shrestha	11–9
F	(Norway) Tune Aksnes Lian	14–12, 11–7
