= Alex Forsyth =

Alex or Alexander Forsyth may refer to:

- Alex Forsyth (American football) (born 1999), American football player
- Alex Forsyth (ice hockey) (1955–2024), Canadian ice hockey player
- Alex Forsyth (footballer, born 1952) (born 1952), Scottish footballer
- Alexander John Forsyth (1769–1843), Scottish minister who first successfully used chemicals to prime gunpowder in fire-arms
- Alex Forsyth (footballer, born 1928) (1928–2020), Scottish footballer
- Alex Forsyth (BBC broadcaster), a BBC News correspondent
