= Alex Madureira =

Brazilian politician (born 1976)

- Madureira in 2024

Member of the Legislative Assembly of São Paulo
- Incumbent
- Assumed office 15 March 2019

Personal details
- Born: 17 September 1976 (age 50)
- Party: Liberal Party (since 2022)

Alexander Muniz de Oliveira (born 17 September 1976), better known as Alex Madureira, is a Brazilian politician serving as a member of the Legislative Assembly of São Paulo since 2019. He has served as ombudsman of the Assembly since 2023.
