= Little Rissington =

Village in Gloucestershire

Coordinates: 51°52′57″N 1°43′37″W

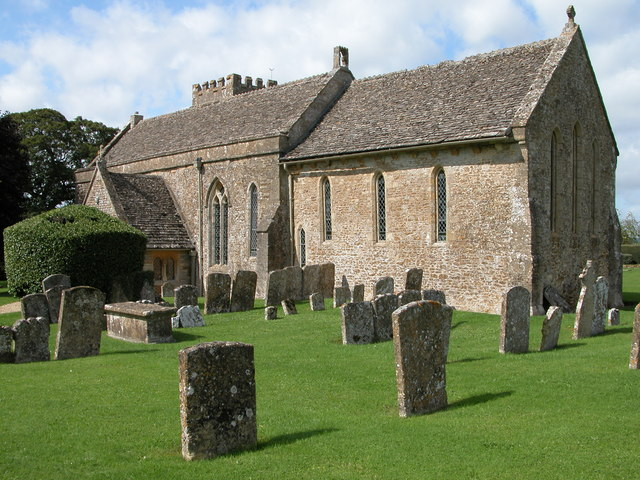
- Parish church of St Peter

- Location within Gloucestershire
- Population: 280 (2011 Census)
- OS grid reference: SP1919
- Civil parish: Little Rissington
- District: Cotswold District
- Shire county: Gloucestershire
- Region: South West
- Country: England
- Sovereign state: United Kingdom
- Post town: Cheltenham
- Postcode district: GL54
- Dialling code: 01451
- Police: Gloucestershire
- Fire: Gloucestershire
- Ambulance: South Western
- UK Parliament: North Cotswolds

Little Rissington is a village and civil parish about 3 1/2 miles (6 km) south of Stow-on-the-Wold in the Cotswold District of Gloucestershire, England. The 2011 Census recorded the parish's population as 280.

== Parish church ==
The oldest part of the Church of England parish church of St Peter is the 13th-century chancel. The nave has two 14th-century windows and the chancel has a 14th-century piscina. The font and tower are 15th-century. There was also a 15th-century rood loft, of which the stone Tudor arch to the stairs now remains. The church is a Grade II* listed building.

== Climate ==
Climate data for Little Rissington, Elevation: 210 m (689 ft), 1991–2020 normals, extremes 1957-
Month	Jan	Feb	Mar	Apr	May	Jun	Jul	Aug	Sep	Oct	Nov	Dec	Year
Record high °C (°F)	13.4 (56.1)	17.1 (62.8)	20.8 (69.4)	24.9 (76.8)	31.1 (88.0)	30.7 (87.3)	35.8 (96.4)	33.7 (92.7)	29.1 (84.4)	27.1 (80.8)	16.6 (61.9)	14.1 (57.4)	35.8 (96.4)
Mean daily maximum °C (°F)	6.5 (43.7)	7.1 (44.8)	9.7 (49.5)	12.8 (55.0)	15.9 (60.6)	19.0 (66.2)	21.4 (70.5)	20.7 (69.3)	17.9 (64.2)	13.6 (56.5)	9.5 (49.1)	6.8 (44.2)	13.4 (56.1)
Daily mean °C (°F)	3.8 (38.8)	4.1 (39.4)	6.0 (42.8)	8.4 (47.1)	11.4 (52.5)	14.3 (57.7)	16.5 (61.7)	16.2 (61.2)	13.8 (56.8)	10.3 (50.5)	6.6 (43.9)	4.2 (39.6)	9.7 (49.5)
Mean daily minimum °C (°F)	1.1 (34.0)	1.1 (34.0)	2.3 (36.1)	4.0 (39.2)	6.8 (44.2)	9.7 (49.5)	11.7 (53.1)	11.8 (53.2)	9.7 (49.5)	7.0 (44.6)	3.8 (38.8)	1.5 (34.7)	5.9 (42.6)
Record low °C (°F)	−15.0 (5.0)	−10.1 (13.8)	−8.1 (17.4)	−4.9 (23.2)	−1.9 (28.6)	2.6 (36.7)	5.6 (42.1)	4.3 (39.7)	2.2 (36.0)	−3.0 (26.6)	−6.9 (19.6)	−11.3 (11.7)	−15.0 (5.0)
Average precipitation mm (inches)	78.5 (3.09)	54.8 (2.16)	53.5 (2.11)	55.6 (2.19)	66.5 (2.62)	57.3 (2.26)	62.5 (2.46)	64.9 (2.56)	63.8 (2.51)	84.2 (3.31)	85.4 (3.36)	82.9 (3.26)	809.6 (31.87)
Average precipitation days (≥ 1.0 mm)	13.1	10.9	10.6	10.3	10.0	9.3	9.2	10.4	9.7	12.5	13.5	13.1	132.6
Mean monthly sunshine hours	62.1	82.5	123.8	169.3	202.3	198.1	219.7	183.6	143.4	110.8	73.0	63.0	1,631.5
Source 1: Met Office
Source 2: Starlings Roost Weather

== RAF station ==
RAF Little Rissington is an RAF station partly in Little Rissington parish.
