= Alex McCool =

NASA manager (1923–2020)

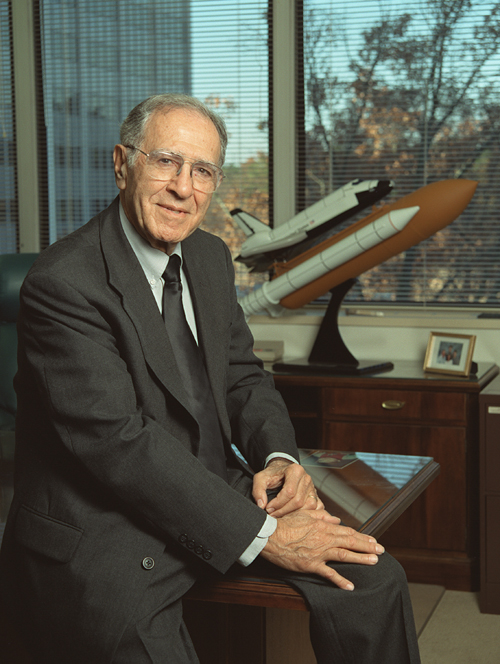
Alex McCool Jr.

Alexander A. McCool Jr. (10 December 1923 – 14 July 2020) was manager of the Space Shuttle Projects Office at the NASA George C. Marshall Space Flight Center in Huntsville, Alabama. During his career, McCool contributed to several space developments including the Apollo Program, Skylab and the Space Shuttle program.

== Early life ==
Alexander A. McCool, Jr. was born 10 December 1923 in Daytona Beach, Florida, the son of Syrian immigrants Alexander A. McCool and Najla Samra. After graduating from high school in Florida in 1942, he became a first class petty officer and machinist mate in the United States Navy. He received his bachelor's degree in mechanical engineering from the University of Southwestern Louisiana. He earned a master's degree in fluid mechanics from Louisiana State University in Baton Rouge. He married Genelle Wade in Vicksburg, Mississippi, on 2 July 1953.

== Professional career ==
After college, McCool first went to work for the Army Corps of Engineers, which assigned him to work on hydraulics projects in Mississippi. Soon afterward, he began his career in rocket development in 1954 at Redstone Arsenal in Huntsville, working on the design of the Redstone Jupiter rocket. In 1960 he joined NASA. As a charter member of the Marshall Space Flight Center, McCool was instrumental in the design of the propulsion systems for the Saturn launch vehicles that propelled Project Apollo to the Moon and directed project engineering for Skylab, the first space science laboratory.

McCool also served as director of the Structures and Propulsion Laboratory at Marshall during the design of the Space Shuttle's propulsion elements. He played a leadership role in engineering the shuttle's main engine and solid rocket boosters.

== Awards ==
- Presidential Rank of Meritorious Executive, from George W. Bush (1991)
- NASA Distinguished Service Medal
- NASA Exceptional Achievement Medal
- Outstanding Leadership Medal
- National Space Club's 2002 Astronautics Engineer Award
