= Alex Aronson =

Dutch aid worker in Iraq (1934–1975 or 1976)

- Born: Alexander Leendert Aronson; 20 December 1934; Amsterdam, Netherlands
- Died: 15 December 1975 (aged 40); Baghdad, Iraq
- Cause of death: Execution
- Occupation: Aid worker
- Spouse: a wife
- Children: a son
- Status: Deceased
- Criminal charges: Espionage, criminal possession of a weapon, possession of classified documents
- Penalty: Death

Alexander Leendert Aronson (20 December 1934 – 15 December 1975) was a Dutch aid worker who was executed in Iraq.

Aronson, who was of Jewish descent, was imprisoned in Bergen-Belsen concentration camp during World War II. After the war, he studied in London to become a nurse. He migrated to Israel in 1955 and traveled the world for six years as an aid worker, before returning to Amsterdam in 1962. He married in 1964 and fathered a son the same year. In the late 1960s, he worked in service of the Red Cross in several countries in Africa and later in India.

From August 1974 onward, he organized aid for the Kurds in northern Iraq. On 25 March 1974, he was arrested by the regime of Saddam Hussein and charged with espionage on behalf of Israel, criminal possession of a weapon and possession of classified documents. The Revolutionary Court found him guilty of these accusations. On 3 November, news broke that Aronson had been hanged, but this proved false. In March 1976, it was announced that he had been executed on 15 December. He was buried on the Jewish cemetery of Muiderberg on 21 May 1976.
