= Michel Allex =

French chocolatier and politician

- Born: 31 October 1947; Bourgoin-Jallieu, Isère, France
- Died: 21 April 2008 (aged 60)
- Occupations: Chocolatier, politician
- Known for: Mayor of Chalon-sur-Saône

Michel Allex (31 October 1947, Bourgoin-Jallieu, Isère – 21 April 2008) was a French chocolatier and politician, the appointed mayor of Chalon-sur-Saône, France since 2002. He was named by Dominique Perben as his replacement when Perben left Chalon-sur-Saône for his duties as a cabinet Minister for Jacques Chirac.

In 1975, Allex opened his chocolate, pastry and confectionery shop located in the Place de l'Hotel de Ville. In 1982 he was distinguished as a Meilleur Ouvrier de France for his work in pastry. He was one of the rare chocolatiers left in France to create his own chocolate liquor from cocoa beans. In 1986 he was given the Meilleur Ouvrier for his work in sorbet and ice cream confections.

M. Allex met Perben in 1983 and joined the team of municipal delegates soon afterwards. He initially worked on helping various associations with their projects. In 1995 he was appointed head of urbanisation and business development.

In 1997, he was awarded the grade of Chevalier in the French Ordre National du Mérite. In 2001, Mayor Perben appointed him as Vice-Mayor.

Monsieur Allex was married and had three children.
