= Alexis Hill =

Alexis Hill may refer to:

- Alexis Hill (Nevada politician), Washoe County Commission Chair
- Alexis Hill (romance writer), romance pseudonym used by Mary Francis Shura (1923–1991)
- Alexis Hill, romance pseudonym used by Ruth Glick and Louise Titchener
