= Aaron Hill House =

Historic house in Massachusetts, United States

- U.S. National Register of Historic Places
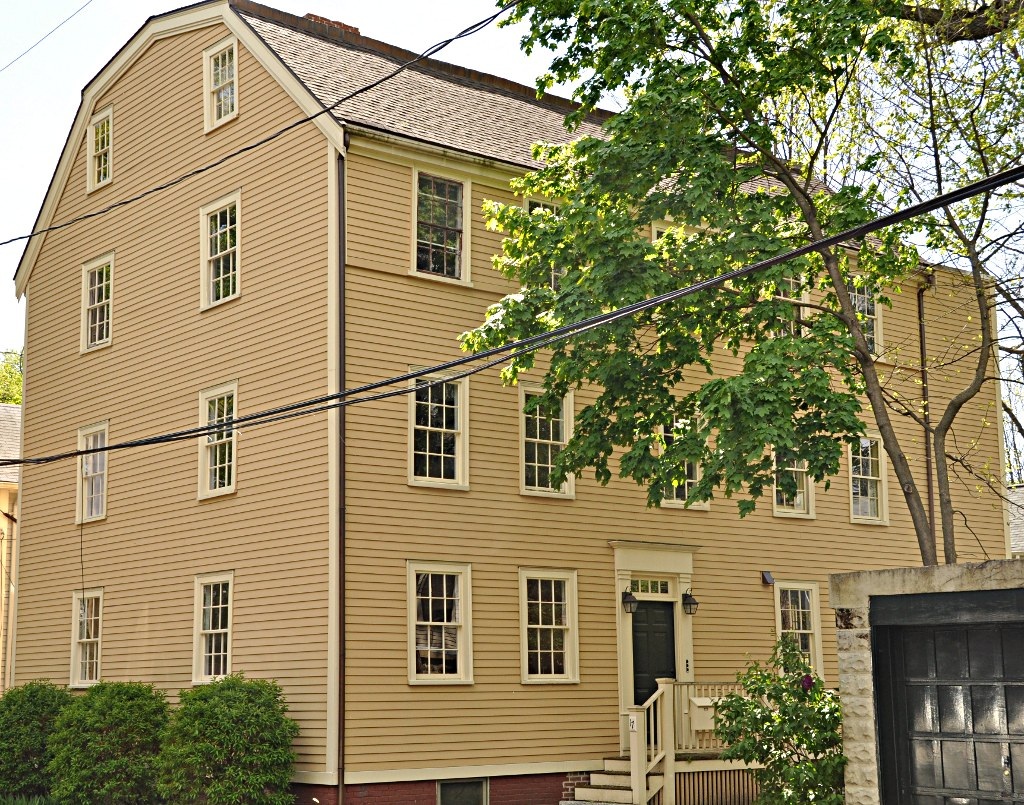

- Location within Massachusetts Location within the United States
- Location: Cambridge, Massachusetts
- Coordinates: 42°22′34.2″N 71°07′44.4″W
- Built: 1754
- Architectural style: Georgian, Federal
- MPS: Cambridge MRA
- NRHP reference No.: 83000807
- Added to NRHP: June 30, 1983

The Aaron Hill House is a historic house at 17 Brown Street in Cambridge, Massachusetts. It was built c. 1754, and was originally a two-story structure with a steeply pitched roof. It was moved c. 1867 from its original location at 99 Brattle Street, at which time the third story was added, giving the roof a gambrel shape. The house was built for Deacon Aaron Hill, a prominent local politician, and is one of only seven houses from that period that still stands in the city.

The house was listed on the National Register of Historic Places in 1983.

== See also ==
- National Register of Historic Places listings in Cambridge, Massachusetts
