= Al Hill =

Al Hill may refer to:

- Al Hill (actor) (1892–1954), American character actor
- Al Hill (ice hockey) (born 1955), Canadian ice hockey player
- Al Hill, pseudonym used by some of the American lyricists of "Let Me Go, Lover!", a popular song released in 1954

== See also ==
- Alan Hill (disambiguation)
- Albert Hill (disambiguation)
- Alex Hill (disambiguation)
- Alexander Hill (disambiguation)
- Alexandra Hill (disambiguation)
- Alfred Hill (disambiguation)
