= Allen Hill =

Allen Hill may refer to:

- Allen Hill (cricketer) (1845–1910), English cricketer and umpire
- Allen Hill (scientist) (1937–2021), professor of bioinorganic chemistry
- Allen Hill (physician), American physician and politician

== See also ==
- Alan Hill (disambiguation)
