= Albert Hill (VC) =

British Army Victoria Cross recipient (1895–1971)

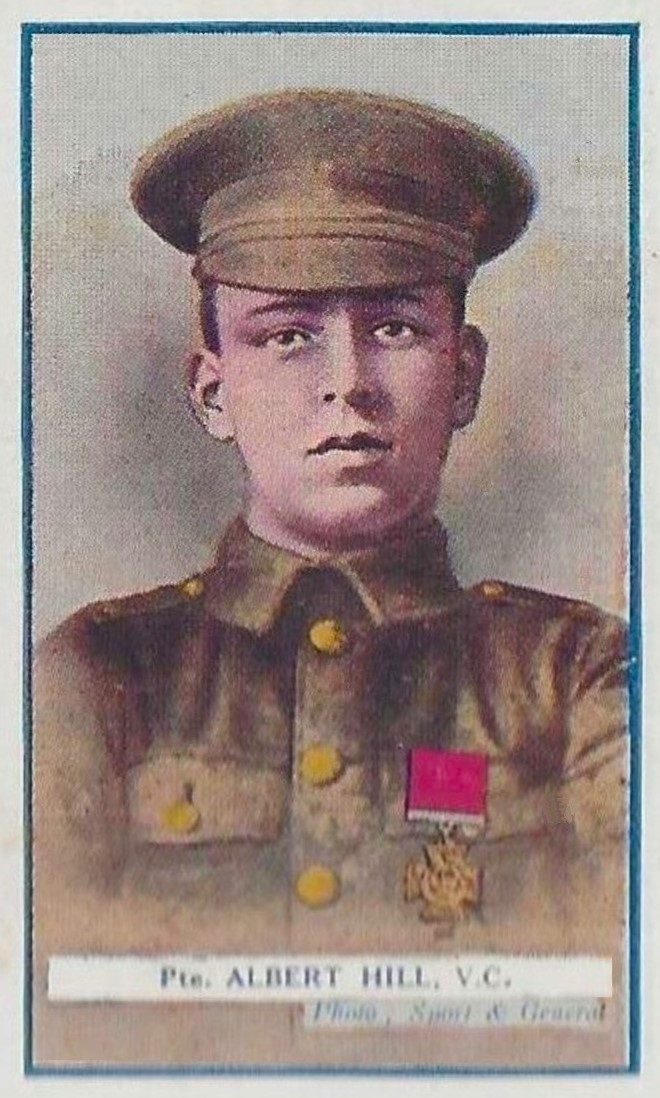
- Hill depicted on a cigarette card
- Born: 24 May 1895; Hulme, Lancashire, England
- Died: 17 February 1971 (aged 75); Pawtucket, Rhode Island, United States
- Burial place: Highland Memorial Park, Johnston, Rhode Island
- Military career
- Allegiance: United Kingdom
- Branch: British Army
- Service years: 1914–1919
- Rank: Private
- Unit: Royal Welsh Fusiliers
- Conflicts: First World War
- Awards: Victoria Cross; Croix de Guerre (France); Cross of St. George (Russia)

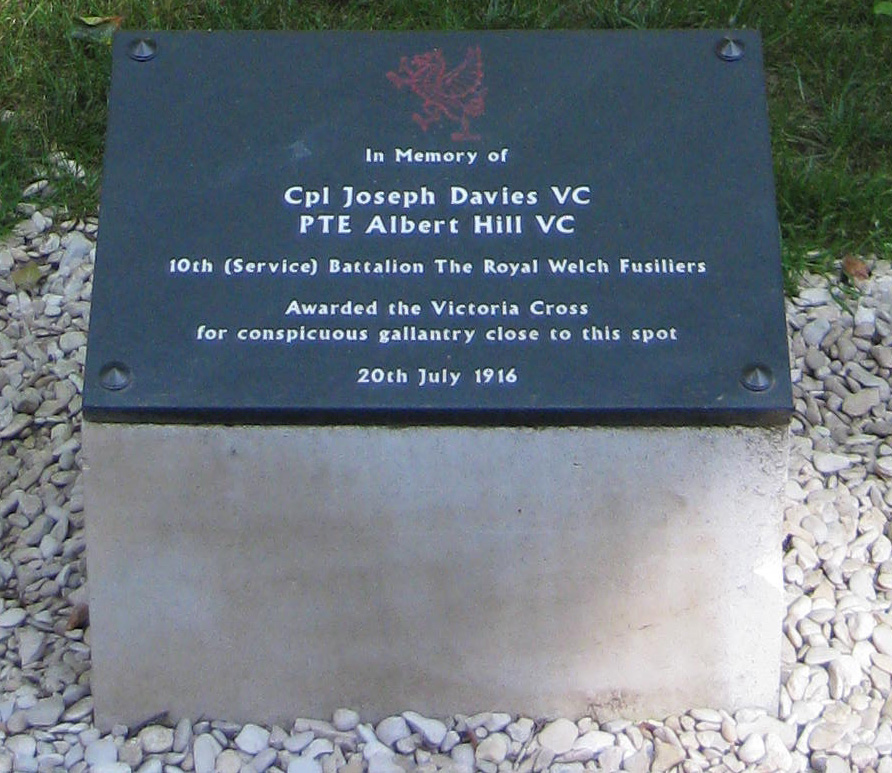
Memorial to Joseph Davies, Delville Wood

Albert Hill VC (24 May 1895 – 17 February 1971) was an English recipient of the Victoria Cross, the highest and most prestigious award for gallantry in the face of the enemy that can be awarded to British and Commonwealth forces.

== Early life ==
Born in Hulme, Manchester, one of ten children, he was a weak and frail child who after his schooling started work in a mill, before becoming an apprentice planker at Wilson Hat Manufacturers, in Wilton Street, Denton (Manchester).

== First World War ==
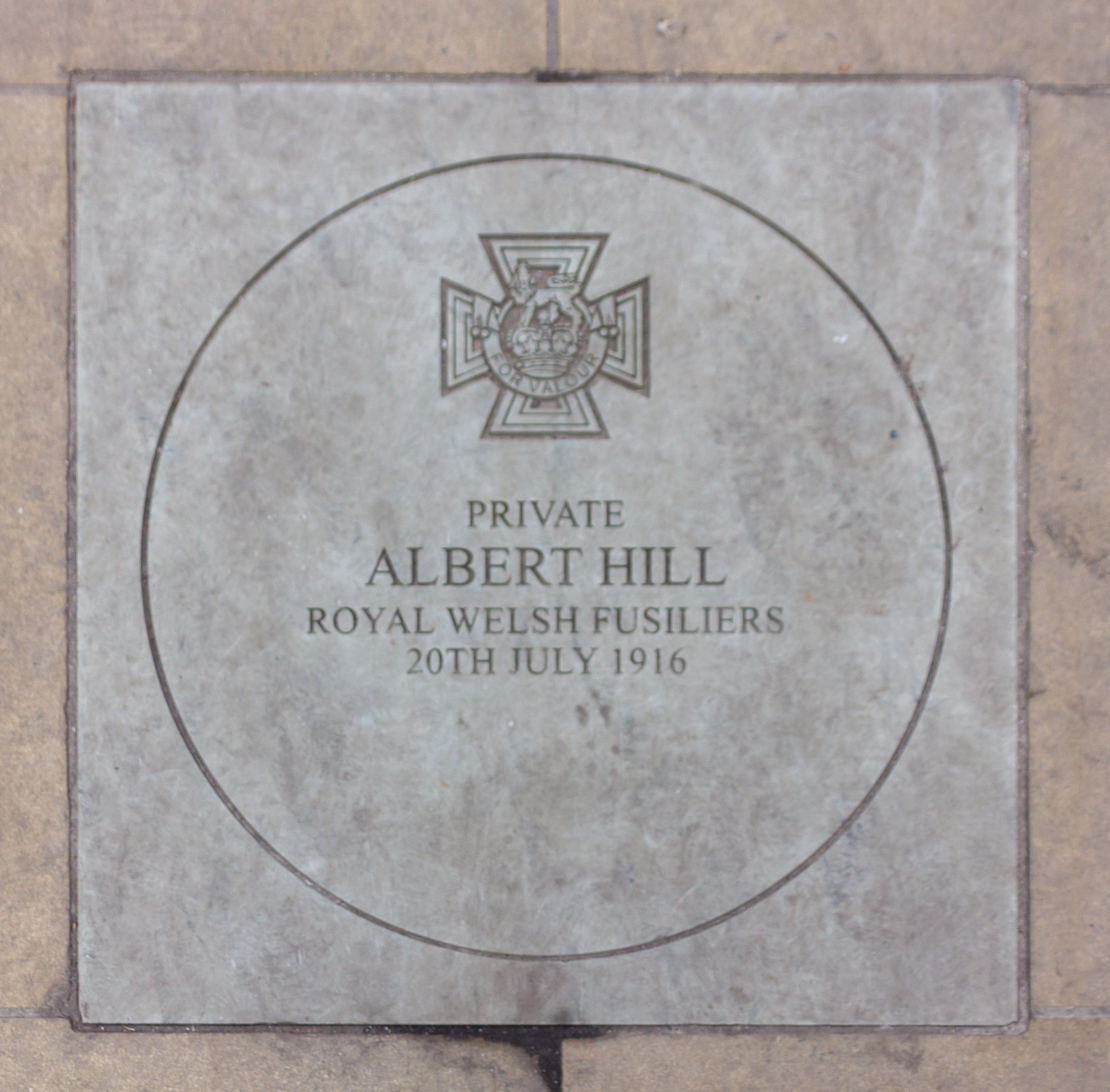
Plaque at the Manchester Cenotaph

In August 1914 he joined the 10th Battalion, the Royal Welsh Fusiliers, as a private and went to France in September 1915. He was awarded the Victoria Cross for his actions at Delville Wood, part of the Battle of the Somme in 1916. His citation read:

For most conspicuous bravery. When his battalion had deployed under very heavy fire for an attack on the enemy in a wood, he dashed forward, when the order to charge was given, and, meeting two of the enemy suddenly, bayonetted them both. He was sent later by his platoon Serjeant to get into touch with the company, and, finding himself cut off and almost surrounded by some twenty of the enemy, attacked them with bombs, killing and wounding many and scattering the remainder. He then joined a serjeant of his company and helped him to fight the way back to the lines. When he got back, hearing that his Company Officer and a scout were lying out wounded, he went out and assisted to bring in the wounded officer, two other men bringing in the scout. Finally, he himself captured and brought in as prisoners two of the enemy. His conduct throughout was magnificent.

He was also a holder of the French Croix de Guerre, the Russian Cross of St. George.

== Later years ==
In February 1919 he returned to work in Wilson's factory, and married Doris Wilson a year later. They emigrated to the United States in 1923, where he found work as a building labourer, and had three daughters and a son. He attempted to enlist on the outbreak of the Second World War, but was advised to do defence work instead.

He died in Pawtucket, Rhode Island in 1971 and was buried with full military honours in Highland Memorial Park, Johnston, Rhode Island.

Hill Court in Wrexham is named in his honour.

== The Medal ==
Albert Hill's Victoria Cross was donated by his family and is displayed at the Royal Welch Fusiliers Museum, Caernarfon Castle, Wales.
