= Anthony F. Hill =

Australian chemist

- Education: University of Bayreuth; University of Auckland
- Scientific career
- Fields: Organometallic chemistry
- Workplaces: University of Bristol (1986-1988) University of Warwick (1988-1991); Imperial College (1992-2000) Australian National University (2001-)
- Website: chemistry.anu.edu.au/people/anthony-hill

Anthony F. Hill is a Professor of Chemistry at the Research School of Chemistry of the Australian National University. He specializes in synthetic, organometallic and coordination chemistry. He is the author of a textbook on the subject of the organometallic chemistry of the transition metals and since 1995 has been an editor of the scientific journal/book series Advances in Organometallic Chemistry. He is a fellow of the Royal Society of Chemistry.

== Education ==
Hill graduated from the University of Auckland with a Master of Science (Honours) and was awarded the title of Dr. rer. nat. from the University of Bayreuth for his doctoral thesis.

== Academic career ==
Prior to being appointed to the position of Professor at the Research School of Chemistry in 2001, Hill held positions at Imperial College (1992–2000), the University of Warwick (1988–1991) and the University of Bristol (1986–1988). At the Research School of Chemistry, Hill is the leader of the 'Synthetic Organometallic and Coordination Chemistry' group and teaches an undergraduate organometallic chemistry course.

== Research interests ==
Tony Hill's research interests investigate the nature of metal carbon bonding and endeavor to develop an understanding of the interaction of carbon with transition and main group metals. The organometallic chemistry of complexes of transition metals with poly(methimazolyl)borato and other related ligands has in recent time been the subject of much of Tony Hill's work. One of Tony Hill's special topics is the chemistry (and synthesis of) the metallaboratranes. Using iridium, platinum, osmium, rhodium, and ruthenium and other transition metals Tony Hill has been able to form compounds containing metal boron bonds.

== Publications ==
As of May 2010, Hill has authored more than 220 scientific journal articles most of which relate to the field of organometallic chemistry.

In 1986, with Prof. Dr. Max Herberhold at the University of Bayreuth, Hill published the first account of complex containing an unsubstituted sulfine.

Hill has recently published several papers concerning the nature of carbo-borane and ruthenium-borane interactions. Most recently, Caldwell and Cordiner collaborated with Hill on a paper entitled "Phosphino and phosphonito carbyne complexes"

Hill is author of a textbook entitled Organotransition Metal Chemistry.
