= Alexandra Hill, Singapore =

Alexandra Hill
- Subzone of Bukit Merah Planning Area

Other transcription(s)
  - Chinese: 亚历山大山
- Location within Singapore
- Coordinates: 1.28816°N 103.80994°E
- Country: Singapore
- Region: Central Region
- Planning Area: Bukit Merah

Alexandra Hill (Chinese: 亚历山大山) is a subzone within the planning area of Bukit Merah, Singapore, as defined by the Urban Redevelopment Authority (URA). Its boundary is made up of Alexandra Road in the north and west; the Ayer Rajah Expressway (AYE) in the south; Lengkok Bahru, Jalan Tiong, Tiong Bahru Road and Tanglin Road in the east.
