= Killing of Anthony Hill =

US veteran shot and killed by police in 2015

- Date: March 9, 2015
- Location: Chamblee, Georgia, United States
- Outcome: Fatal shooting
- Deaths: Anthony Hill
- Burial: Moncks Corner, South Carolina, United States
- Inquiries: Georgia Bureau of Investigation
- Accused: Officer Robert Olsen
- Charges: Felony murder (two counts); Aggravated assault Making a false statement Violation of oath by a public officer (two counts)
- Verdict: Not guilty of murder; guilty of aggravated assault, two counts of violating his oath of office, and making a false statement

The killing of Anthony Hill, a U.S. Air Force veteran, occurred on March 9, 2015, in Chamblee, Georgia, near Atlanta. Hill, fatally shot by police officer Robert Olsen, suffered from mental illness and was naked and unarmed at the time of the incident. The incident was covered in local and national press and sparked the involvement of Black Lives Matter and other advocacy groups who demonstrated their anger at the shooting. In January 2016, a grand jury indicted officer Olsen on two counts of felony murder and one count of aggravated assault. Nearing the fourth anniversary of the homicide, it was decided that Olsen's trial would be rescheduled for September 23, 2019, with delays including three successive judges having recused themselves in the case.

On 2019, Olsen was acquitted of murder, but found guilty of numerous lesser charges, including assault and violating his oath of office, and making a false statement, and sentenced to 12 years in prison. In March 2024, an appellate court overturned Olsen's convictions. Prosecutors said they would appeal the ruling, but in May 2025, Olsen pleaded guilty to aggravated assault and was sentenced to 15 years in prison with 12 years commuted, with credit for time served. He was ordered to serve the rest of his sentence and probation and also perform 100 hours of community service.

== Background ==
Anthony Hill (born June 15, 1988), born in Moncks Corner, South Carolina, was a veteran of the United States Air Force who had served in Afghanistan. According to his family, he had post-traumatic stress disorder. He had been medically discharged from the Air Force two years before after being diagnosed with bipolar disorder. On a Twitter account apparently belonging to Hill, he acknowledged having the disorder. According to his girlfriend, he had recently stopped taking his medication due to muscular side effects, believing he would see his doctor at the VA within the week.

Anthony was a lover of music, aspiring musician and writer, and often volunteered with local youth to combat his PTSD. The day before his death, he posted on Facebook the story of Cliff Young, the 61 year old potato farmer who had an unexpected win in the inaugural Sydney to Melbourne Ultramarathon using an interesting running method now nicknamed "the Cliff Young Shuffle".

== Shooting ==
Hill was noted to be acting erratically when police were called; he had hung from his second-story balcony in his apartment complex, and his speech was slurred. He had reportedly been running around the complex naked and knocking on doors asking for his medicine and lying and crawling on the ground. The woman who called 911 told Hill's family's lawyer that she had called in order to get medical personnel to come for Hill.

Officer Robert Olsen, employed by the Dekalb County Police Department for seven years, was dispatched to the scene and found him in the parking lot of the complex. Olsen waited in his car for several minutes, possibly for backup, when Hill began approaching from about 180 feet (55 m) away. Olsen exited the car and began moving backward. Hill, apparently unarmed, ran toward Officer Olsen, who stepped back and called to him to stop. Hill began to walk naked with hands to side, failing to comply with orders to stop. Olsen shot him twice. They were six to seven feet apart when the shots were fired. Hill died at the scene. Olsen had also been carrying a Taser, police baton, and pepper spray, but DeKalb Police Chief Cedric Alexander said Olsen chose the firearm over those options. Several residents witnessed the shooting. Olsen said later that he had believed Hill was a threat to the officer's safety and under the influence of drugs like phencyclidine or bath salts. He told the grand jury deciding whether to indict him on charges of murder about other cases in which suspects who had used these drugs had attacked police.

== Aftermath ==
The Georgia Bureau of Investigation (GBI) began investigating the shooting within days, and Olsen was placed on administrative leave for the duration. He remained on paid leave through the time of the criminal grand jury hearing. In April 2015 the GBI handed its findings over to the district attorney.

The shooting prompted outcry about the police department's approach to handling people with mental illness, as well as critiques about race. The shooting came in the wake of national social unrest and racial debate after the killing of Michael Brown in Ferguson, Missouri, which inspired the Black Lives Matter movement. As they had in other parts of the country, protests arose in Atlanta over race and police killings and use of excessive force. Hill had remarked on the national debate three days prior to his death, posting on Facebook, "[t]he key thing to remember is, #blacklivesmatter, ABSOLUTELY, but not more so than any other life." He remarked via Twitter, "[i]f 99 out of 100 cops [are] killing black men like its hunting season that leaves 1 just doing his job." In the context of increased attention of police killings of racial minorities, prosecutors face greater pressure.

Hill's family filed a wrongful death lawsuit against Officer Olsen, the police department, Dekalb county, and its department of commissioners.

=== Grand jury ===
A civil grand jury convened in October 2015 determined that the shooting should be further investigated. Olsen had told the jury that he had felt threatened by Hill. It decided that a criminal grand jury would hear the evidence.

In January 2016, District Attorney Robert D. James Jr. of DeKalb County announced that he would ask the criminal grand jury to indict, and that a warrant had been issued for Olsen's arrest. Two weeks later, on January 21, 2016, the criminal grand jury indicted Officer Olsen for two counts of felony murder, one count of aggravated assault, one count of making a false statement and two counts of violation of oath by a public officer. Felony murder implies the defendant killed someone while committing another felony; the two felonies are the assault and violation of oath charges. The district attorney said that Olsen was charged with making a false statement because he had told another officer during the investigation that Hill had hit him in the chest. He also said the violation of oath charges had to do with his violation of department rules and use of force. An arrest warrant was issued for Olsen on the 21st. He turned himself in that day and was granted a bond of $110,200 and released.

Olsen's indictment marked the first time in six years that an officer was charged with murder in Georgia for shooting someone while on duty. An investigation by news outlets found that no officers had faced prosecution for shootings in Georgia in the previous five years—which saw 184 shootings by police. Unlike any other state in the US, Georgia allows officers (but not regular civilians) to be present during the entire grand jury hearing and to make a statement at the very end that is unchallenged by anyone.

In anticipation of the announcement in late January, dozens of activists known as Rise Up Georgia camped outside the courthouse in tents, displaying hand-made signs in support of Hill for several days before the grand jury announced the indictment of Officer Olsen on all six counts; the group maintained a 24-hour operation in front of the courthouse by sleeping in shifts. A crowd of several dozen began cheering and chanting when the decision to indict was announced outside the courthouse. Groups involved in the demonstration included Rise Up Georgia, Black Lives Matter, Southerners On New Ground (SONG), and the Southern Christian Leadership Conference.

Olsen resigned from the DeKalb County Police Department on January 25, 2016. Until that time, this officer was still being paid by DeKalb County.

=== Trial and sentencing ===
Olsen pleaded not guilty on June 6, 2016.

The Georgia Supreme Court ruled October 16, 2017, that the prosecution can resume after a year on hold. Olsen and his attorney had argued that the Grand Jury process was compromised, and the indictment should be thrown out, but their motion was denied.

Jury selection began Monday, September 23, 2019, at the DeKalb County Courthouse. Superior Court Judge LaTisha Dear Jackson presides over the trial proceedings. Three previously assigned judges had recused themselves from the case, which undoubtedly contributed to the delay in setting a trial date. The jury was seated on the morning of Thursday, September 26, with opening statements being delivered, as well as the testimony of three state witnesses.

On October 14, 2019, Olsen was convicted by a jury of one count of aggravated assault, two counts of violating his oath of office and one count of making a false statement. The jury was composed of seven women and five men, with a racial composition of five black people, five white people, one Asian person and one Hispanic person. The jury was divided 9 to 3 in favor of conviction on felony murder but to avoid deadlocking they acquitted him of felony murder and convicted him on the remaining charges. The prosecution argued for a 25-year prison sentence followed by five years probation. Olsen was sentenced on November 1, 2019, to 12 years in prison, followed by eight years of probation by DeKalb County Superior Court Judge LaTisha Dear Jackson. Olsen is also banned for life from working in law enforcement, prohibited from possessing firearms, and prohibited from profiting from the case.

In March 2024, an appellate court overturned Olsen's convictions. Prosecutors have said they will appeal the ruling.
