= Alex Hills =

English composer

Alex Hills (born 1974) is an English composer of contemporary classical music. He was born in Cambridge.

He studied composition with Michael Finnissy at the Royal Academy of Music and completed his doctorate with Brian Ferneyhough at Stanford University. Additional influences include Stefan Wolpe, Iannis Xenakis as well as bands such as The Shaggs and the Yellow Magic Orchestra.

A number of his works have been based on Renaissance isorhythmic techniques such as the nonet Ficta . Other important works include Broken Frames, for cello and piano, and the solo piano pieces Injera and The Principle of Terrestrial Mediocrity (which was recorded for CD by Chris Jones). His most substantial work to date is 'Everything in Life can be Montaged', an hour-long piece for soprano, two solo celli, percussion, ensemble and electronics based on ideas and texts by the Russian thinker Viktor Shklovsky. It received its first performance at the Royal Academy of Music in June 2009. In 2013, a first portrait CD of his music was released on Carrier Records.

His music has also been performed at the Cheltenham Festival, BMIC Cutting Edge series, Rational Rec, Carnegie Hall and by the Berlin-based Ensemble Mosaik at SWR Ars Nova.

He lectures at the Royal Academy of Music, where he teaches analysis and music theory. He also writes a column on rock and pop music for Clash.
