= Alex Hyndman =

British journalist (born 1978)

- Born: Alexandra Hyndman; 25 April 1978 (age 48); Grantham, Lincolnshire, England
- Other name: Alexandra Hill
- Occupations: Journalist, Presenter
- Agent: Knight Ayton Management
- Spouse: Geoff Hill
- Children: Olivia Catherine Hill Alfie James Hill
- Website: www.alexandrahyndman.com

Alex Hyndman (also known as Alexandra Hill) is an English broadcast journalist.

== Early life ==
Hyndman was born in Grantham but grew up in Australia where she was educated at St Aloysius College, Adelaide. She moved back to the UK and attended King Edward VII School (Melton Mowbray), before reading English Literature at Royal Holloway, University of London and Journalism at De Montfort University.

== Career ==
Alex began her broadcasting career in 2001 with the Lincs FM Group working as a broadcast journalist, before joining GCap Media and IRN as a newsreader, editor and journalist.

She joined Sky News Radio in 2004 as a newsreader and journalist before becoming a presenter for Sky Sports News and Sky News Three years later, she began presenting for the now-defunct sports news channel Setanta Sports News.

In November 2008, she became an anchor for ITV London regional news programme London Tonight, where she presented the show in place of main presenter Katie Derham, who primarily appeared on ITV News. She also covered Derham on the ITV Lunchtime News on ITV. From September 2009, Alex could be seen as a presenter on ITV News at 5:30 on ITV as well as London Today bulletins during Daybreak on ITV London, she left in January 2011 and returned in May 2012 for a short time. From 8 August 2013 she presented bulletins for a period.

== Personal life ==
Hyndman ran the London Marathon on 13 April 2008 to raise money for the charity H.E.A.R.T UK.

She was married to former ITV news editor Geoff Hill, and became known professionally as Alexandra Hill. Prior to June 2010 she had used her maiden name and abbreviated her first name, going by Alex Hyndman – the name she reverted to in the summer of 2015. Alex gave birth to her first child, Olivia Catherine Hill, on 8 February 2011, as confirmed by the baby girl's father, Geoff Hill. She gave birth to a baby boy in September 2012 called Alfie James. Alex and Geoff later separated. Geoff remarried in December 2020 before dying in September 2021 from leukaemia.
